= France at the 2014 Summer Youth Olympics =

- IOC code: FRA
- NOC: French Olympic Committee
- Website: franceolympique.com

in Nanjing
- Competitors: 82 in 22 sports
- Medals Ranked 4th: Gold 8 Silver 3 Bronze 9 Total 20

Summer Youth Olympics appearances
- 2010; 2014; 2018; 2026

France competed at the 2014 Summer Youth Olympics, in Nanjing, China from 16 August to 28 August 2014.

== Medalists ==
Medals awarded to participants of mixed-NOC (Combined) teams are represented in italics. These medals are not counted towards the individual NOC medal tally.

Medal	Name	Sport	Event	Date
Gold	France boys' national rugby sevens team: Alex Arrate; Faraj Fartass; Alex Gracbling; Alexandre Lagarde; Martin Laveau; Alexandre Nicque; Alexandre Pilati; Arthur Retière; Alexandre Roumat; Atila Septar; Sacha Valleau; Matthieu Voisin	Rugby Sevens	Boys' Tournament	20 August
Gold	Karim Mouliom	Basketball	Boys' Dunk Contest	21 August
Gold	Morgane Duchêne	Judo	Mixed Team	21 August
Gold	Yoann Miangue	Taekwondo	Boys' +73 kg	21 August
Gold	Émilie Morier	Triathlon	Mixed Relay	21 August
Gold	Laura Valette	Athletics	Girls' 100 m Hurdles	23 August
Gold	Lukas Moutarde	Athletics	Boys' Javelin Throw	25 August
Gold	Yanis David	Athletics	Girls' Triple Jump	25 August
Gold	Lucas Roisin	Canoeing	Boys' C1 slalom	27 August
Gold	Camille Prigent	Canoeing	Girls' K1 slalom	27 August
Silver	Nawal Meniker	Athletics	Girls' High Jump	24 August
Silver	Mélanie Gaubil	Archery	Girls' Individual	25 August
Silver	Coralie Gassama	Athletics	Mixed 8x100m Relay	26 August
Silver	Teddy Cheremond; Lucas Dussoulier; Élie Fedensieu; Karim Mouliom	Basketball	Boys' Tournament	26 August
Bronze	Stéphane Audibert	Taekwondo	Boys' −48 kg	17 August
Bronze	Émilie Morier	Triathlon	Girls' Race	17 August
Bronze	Edouard Dortomb	Shooting	Boys' 10m Air Pistol	18 August
Bronze	Enguerrand Roger	Fencing	Boys' Foil	19 August
Bronze	Enguerrand Roger	Fencing	Mixed Team	20 August
Bronze	Camille Juillet	Rowing	Girls' Single Sculls	20 August
Bronze	Jolan Florimont	Judo	Mixed Team	21 August
Bronze	Anthony Coullet	Weightlifting	Boys' +85 kg	23 August
Bronze	Lucie Pianazza	Sailing	Girls' Techno 293	24 August
Bronze	Victor Coroller	Athletics	Boys' 400 m Hurdles	25 August
Bronze	Koumba Larroque	Wrestling	Girls' Freestyle -60kg	26 August

== Archery ==
France qualified two archers from its performance at the 2013 World Archery Youth Championships.

Individual

Athlete	Event	Ranking round		Round of 32	Round of 16	Quarterfinals	Semifinals	Final / BM	Rank
Athlete	Event	Score	Seed	Opposition Score	Opposition Score	Opposition Score	Opposition Score	Opposition Score	Rank
Thomas Koenig	Boys' Individual	679	6	Reddig (NAM); W 6–0	Denny (GBR); L 2–6	Did not advance			9
Mélanie Gaubil	Girls' Individual	663	5	Sainz (CUB); W 6–2	Boda (IND); W 6–0	Marin (ESP); W 6–2	Lee (KOR); W 6–4	Li (CHN); L 5–6	2nd place, silver medalist(s)

Team

Athletes	Event	Ranking round		Round of 32	Round of 16	Quarterfinals	Semifinals	Final / BM	Rank
Athletes	Event	Score	Seed	Opposition Score	Opposition Score	Opposition Score	Opposition Score	Opposition Score	Rank
Thomas Koenig (FRA); Alexa Rivera (MEX)	Mixed Team	1283	17	Rodriguez Sas (ARG); Laharnar (SLO); W 6-2	Muto (JPN); Mugabilzada (AZE); L 4-5	Did not advance			9
Melanie Gaubil (FRA); Gasper Strajhar (SLO)	Mixed Team	1278	21	Tuokkola (FIN); Peters (CAN); L 4-5	Did not advance				17

== Athletics ==
France qualified 18 athletes.

Qualification Legend: Q=Final A (medal); qB=Final B (non-medal); qC=Final C (non-medal); qD=Final D (non-medal); qE=Final E (non-medal)

Boys
Track & road events

Athlete	Event	Heats		Final	
Athlete	Event	Result	Rank	Result	Rank
Baptiste Mischler	1500 m	3:47.38 PB	4	3:47.22 PB	6
Mohamed-Amine El Bouajaji	3000 m	8:16.43 PB	6 Q	DQ	
Victor Coroller	400 m hurdles	51.91	4 Q	51.19 PB	3rd place, bronze medalist(s)
Anthony Pontier	2000 m steeplechase	5:45.35 PB	6 Q	5:48.69	5

Field Events

Athlete	Event	Qualification		Final	
Athlete	Event	Distance	Rank	Distance	Rank
Alex Rousseau-Jamard	Long jump	7.20	4 Q	7.32 PB	4
Pierre Cottin	Pole vault	4.80	9 qB	4.80	9
Ludovic Besson	Shot put	16.63	15 qB	17.26	13
Lukas Moutarde	Javelin throw	72.03 PB	5 Q	74.48 PB	1st place, gold medalist(s)

Girls
Track & road events

Athlete	Event	Heats		Final	
Athlete	Event	Result	Rank	Result	Rank
Cynthia Leduc	100 m	12.01 PB	12 qB	12.15	12
Fanny Peltier	200 m	24.47	5 Q	24.46	5
Iyndra-Sareena Carti	400 m	54.42	8 Q	53.54 PB	4
Laura Valette	100 m hurdles	13.34 PB	1 Q	13.34 PB	1st place, gold medalist(s)
Coralie Gassama	400 m hurdles	1:01.03	10 qB	1:00.87	10
Lea Navarro	2000 m steeplechase	6:48.42	8 Q	6:45.30	7
Axelle Ham	5 km walk	—N/a		25:01.26	10

Field events

Athlete	Event	Qualification		Final	
Athlete	Event	Distance	Position	Distance	Position
Yanis David	Triple jump	13.06	1 Q	13.33 PB	1st place, gold medalist(s)
Nawal Meniker	High jump	1.78	7 Q	1.87 PB	2nd place, silver medalist(s)
Thiziri Daci	Pole vault	3.70	2 Q	3.80	5

== Badminton ==
France qualified two athletes based on the 2 May 2014 BWF Junior World Rankings.

Singles

Athlete	Event	Group stage				Quarterfinal	Semifinal	Final / BM	Rank
Athlete	Event	Opposition Score	Opposition Score	Opposition Score	Rank	Opposition Score	Opposition Score	Opposition Score	Rank
Tanguy Citron	Boys' Singles	Vlaar (NED); W 2-0	Weisskirchen (GER); L 1-2	Krapez (SLO); W 2-1	2	did not advance			
Lole Courtois	Girls' Singles	Chen (NED); L 1-2	Ongbumrungpan (THA); L 0-2	Ishaak (SUR); W 2-0	3	did not advance			

Doubles

Athlete	Event	Group stage				Quarterfinal	Semifinal	Final / BM	Rank
Athlete	Event	Opposition Score	Opposition Score	Opposition Score	Rank	Opposition Score	Opposition Score	Opposition Score	Rank
Daniela Macias (PER); Tanguy Citron (FRA)	Mixed Doubles	Lin (CHN); Kim (KOR); L 1-2	Cheam (MAS); Ng (HKG); L 0-2	Gnedt (AUT); Solis (MEX); L 1-2	4	did not advance			
Lole Courtois (FRA); Daniel Mihigo (UGA)	Mixed Doubles	Angodavidanalage (SRI); He (CHN); L 0-2	Ayittey (GHA); Gadde (IND); WO 2-0	Ong (SIN); Hendahewa (SRI); L 0-2	3	did not advance			

== Basketball ==
France qualified a boys' team from their performance at the 2013 U18 3x3 World Championships.

Skills Competition

Athlete	Event	Qualification				Final First Stage				Final Second Stage			
Athlete	Event	Round 1	Round 2	Total	Rank	Round 1	Round 2	Total	Rank	Round 1	Round 2	Total	Rank
Karim Mouliom	Boys' Dunk Contest	27	26	53	2 Q	30	24	54	2	25	30	55	1st place, gold medalist(s)

=== Boys' tournament ===
Roster

- Teddy Cheremond
- Lucas Dussoulier
- Élie Fedensieu
- Karim Mouliom

Group stage

Pos	Team	Pld	W	L	PF	PA	PD	Pts	Qualification
1	Lithuania	9	9	0	165	129	+36	18	Round of 16
2	Slovenia	9	7	2	152	120	+32	16	Round of 16
3	China	9	6	3	164	143	+21	15 (Note: CHN +1, PUR −1)	Round of 16
4	Puerto Rico	9	6	3	152	136	+16	15	Round of 16
5	Poland	9	5	4	153	127	+26	14	Round of 16
6	France	9	4	5	151	127	+24	13	Round of 16
7	Hungary	9	3	6	158	165	−7	12	Round of 16
8	Uruguay	9	2	7	103	154	−51	11 (Note: URU +1, GER −1)	Round of 16
9	Germany	9	2	7	118	149	−31	11	Eliminated
10	Indonesia	9	1	8	86	152	−66	10	Eliminated

Notes:

18 August 2014
18:20

Poland	14–12	France

Wutaishan Sports Center, Nanjing

18 August 2014
21:20

Slovenia	15–11	France

Wutaishan Sports Center, Nanjing

19 August 2014
20:00

France	15–8	Puerto Rico

Wutaishan Sports Center, Nanjing

20 August 2014
17:20

Indonesia	7–21	France

Wutaishan Sports Center, Nanjing

20 August 2014
20:20

France	18–19	China

Wutaishan Sports Center, Nanjing

22 August 2014
18:40

Hungary	21–20	France

Wutaishan Sports Center, Nanjing

23 August 2014
17:40

France	20–11	Germany

Wutaishan Sports Center, Nanjing

23 August 2014
20:20

Uruguay	13–17	France

Wutaishan Sports Center, Nanjing

24 August 2014
19:00

France	17–19	Lithuania

Wutaishan Sports Center, Nanjing

Knockout Stage

Round of 16	Quarterfinals	Semifinals	Final	Rank
Opposition Score	Opposition Score	Opposition Score	Opposition Score	Rank
Spain; W 18-10	Romania; W 19–11	Argentina; W 16–14	Lithuania; L 16-18	2nd place, silver medalist(s)

== Beach volleyball ==
France qualified a boys' and girls' team from their performance at the 2014 CEV Youth Continental Cup Final.

Athletes	Event	Preliminary round	Standing	Round of 24	Round of 16	Quarterfinals	Semifinals	Final / BM	Rank
Athletes	Event	Opposition Score	Standing	Opposition Score	Opposition Score	Opposition Score	Opposition Score	Opposition Score	Rank
Arnaud Gauthier; Arnaud Loiseau	Boys'	Amissah – Tetteh (GHA); W 2 - 0	Q		Aulisi – Aveiro (ARG); L 1 - 2	Did not advance			17
Arnaud Gauthier; Arnaud Loiseau	Boys'	Rosa – Sweeney (ISV); W 2 - 0	Q		Aulisi – Aveiro (ARG); L 1 - 2	Did not advance			17
Arnaud Gauthier; Arnaud Loiseau	Boys'	Sahneh – Shobeiri (IRI); W 2 - 0	Q		Aulisi – Aveiro (ARG); L 1 - 2	Did not advance			17
Arnaud Gauthier; Arnaud Loiseau	Boys'	Figueroa – Rivera (PUR); L 1 - 2	Q		Aulisi – Aveiro (ARG); L 1 - 2	Did not advance			17
Arnaud Gauthier; Arnaud Loiseau	Boys'	Bramont – Heredia (PER)	Q		Aulisi – Aveiro (ARG); L 1 - 2	Did not advance			17
Lézana Placette; Alexia Richard	Girls'	Bethancourt/Giron (GUA)	3 Q	Caputo/Muno (USA); L 0 - 2	Did not advance				25
Lézana Placette; Alexia Richard	Girls'	Bobadilla/Valiente (PAR); L 0 – 2	3 Q	Caputo/Muno (USA); L 0 - 2	Did not advance				25
Lézana Placette; Alexia Richard	Girls'	Gesslbauer/Radl (AUT)	3 Q	Caputo/Muno (USA); L 0 - 2	Did not advance				25
Lézana Placette; Alexia Richard	Girls'	Douduwa/Essumang (GHA); W 2 – 0	3 Q	Caputo/Muno (USA); L 0 - 2	Did not advance				25
Lézana Placette; Alexia Richard	Girls'	Kawfong/Tangkaeo (THA); W 2 – 1	3 Q	Caputo/Muno (USA); L 0 - 2	Did not advance				25

== Boxing ==
France qualified one boxer based on its performance at the 2014 AIBA Youth World Championships

Girls

Athlete	Event	Preliminaries	Semifinals	Final / RM	Rank
Athlete	Event	Opposition Result	Opposition Result	Opposition Result	Rank
Davina Michel	-75 kg	Wojcik (POL); L 0-3	Did not advance	Bout for 5th place Fabela (USA); W 3-0	5

== Canoeing ==
France qualified four boats based on its performance at the 2013 World Junior Canoe Sprint and Slalom Championships.

Boys

Athlete	Event	Qualification		Repechage		Round of 16		Quarterfinals	Semifinals	Final / BM	Rank
Athlete	Event	Time	Rank	Time	Rank	Time	Rank	Opposition Result	Opposition Result	Opposition Result	Rank
Lucas Roisin	C1 slalom			—N/a					Marko Mirgorodský (SVK); W	Robert Hendrick (IRL); W	1st place, gold medalist(s)
Lucas Roisin	C1 sprint			—N/a							
Arthur Taubner	K1 slalom							Paul Sunderland (GBR); L	Did not advance		5
Arthur Taubner	K1 sprint										

Girls

Athlete	Event	Qualification		Repechage		Round of 16		Quarterfinals	Semifinals	Final / BM	Rank
Athlete	Event	Time	Rank	Time	Rank	Time	Rank	Opposition Result	Opposition Result	Opposition Result	Rank
Lucie Prioux	C1 slalom					—N/a		Nadine Weratschnig (AUT); L	Martina Satkova (CZE); L	Birgit Ohmayer (GER); L	4
Lucie Prioux	C1 sprint					—N/a					
Camille Prigent	K1 slalom							Klaudia Zwolinska (POL); W 1.:19.449		Yan Jiahua (CHN); W	1st place, gold medalist(s)
Camille Prigent	K1 sprint										

== Diving ==
France qualified two divers based on its performance at the Nanjing 2014 Diving Qualifying Event.

Athlete	Event	Preliminary		Final	
Athlete	Event	Points	Rank	Points	Rank
Alexis Jandard	Boys' 3 m springboard	452.60	11	439.10	12
Alexis Jandard	Boys' 10 m platform	423.80	8	429.25	9
Alaïs Kalonji	Girls' 10 m platform	382.00	5	405.85	4
Zhiayi Loh (MAS); Alexis Jandard (FRA)	Mixed team	—N/a		318.20	7

== Fencing ==
France qualified two athletes based on its performance at the 2014 FIE Cadet World Championships.

Boys

Athlete	Event	Pool Round	Seed	Round of 16	Quarterfinals	Semifinals	Final / BM	Rank
Athlete	Event	Opposition Score	Seed	Opposition Score	Opposition Score	Opposition Score	Opposition Score	Rank
Enguerrand Roger	Foil	Marostega (BRA) Fitzgerald (AUS) Braun (GER) Haglund (USA); W 5-4; Fileš (CRO)		(Lebanon) El-Choueiri; W 15–1		(Hong Kong) Choi; L 14–15	(South Korea) Seo; W 15–11	3rd place, bronze medalist(s)

Girls

Athlete	Event	Pool Round	Seed	Round of 16	Quarterfinals	Semifinals	Final / BM	Rank
Athlete	Event	Opposition Score	Seed	Opposition Score	Opposition Score	Opposition Score	Opposition Score	Rank
Mérédith Guillaume	Foil	Massialas (USA); L 2-5; Miyawaki (JPN) Huang (CHN) Cecchini (BRA) Pásztor (HUN) Clavijo (BOL); W 5-0						

Mixed Team

Athletes	Event	Round of 16	Quarterfinals	Semifinals / PM	Final / PM	Rank
Athletes	Event	Opposition Score	Opposition Score	Opposition Score	Opposition Score	Rank
Europe 2 Chiara Crovari; Italy; Marios Giakoumatos; Greece; Linus Islas Flygare; Sweden; Åsa Linde; Sweden; Enguerand Roger; France; Anna Szymczak; Poland	Mixed Team	Bye	Americas 1 W 30–24	Asia-Oceania 1 L 29–30	Asia-Oceania 2 W 30–25	3rd place, bronze medalist(s)
	Mixed Team					

== Golf ==
France qualified one team of two athletes based on the 8 June 2014 IGF Combined World Amateur Golf Rankings.

Individual

Athlete	Event	Round 1		Round 2			Round 3			Total	
Athlete	Event	Score	Rank	Score	Total	Rank	Score	Total	Rank	Score	Rank
Paul Elissalde	Boys										
Marion Veysseyre	Girls	71	7								

Team

Athletes	Event	Round 1 (Foursome)		Round 2 (Fourball)			Round 3 (Individual Stroke)				Total	
Athletes	Event	Score	Rank	Score	Total	Rank	Boy	Girl	Total	Rank	Score	Rank
Paul Elissalde; Marion Veysseyre	Mixed											

== Gymnastics ==
=== Artistic Gymnastics ===
France qualified one athlete based on its performance at the 2014 European MAG Championships and another athlete based on its performance at the 2014 European WAG Championships.

Boys

Athlete	Event	Apparatus						Total	Rank
Athlete	Event	F	PH	R	V	PB	HB	Total	Rank
Zachari Hrimeche	Qualification	13.850 7 Q	12.650 18	13.350 7 Q	13.850 22	13.300 9	13.500 6 Q	80.500	7 Q
Zachari Hrimeche	All-Around	13.900	12.550	13.000	14.200	13.400	13.700	80.750	8
Zachari Hrimeche	Floor	—N/a						13.266	7
Zachari Hrimeche	Rings	—N/a						13.016	7
Zachari Hrimeche	Horizontal Bar	—N/a						13.633	4

Girls

Athlete	Event	Apparatus				Total	Rank
Athlete	Event	V	UB	BB	F	Total	Rank
Camille Bahl	Qualification	13.850 8	11.900 13	12.300 17	12.450 10	50.500	10 Q
Camille Bahl	All-Around	13.650	12.100	12.300	12.700	50.750	8

=== Trampoline ===
France qualified one athlete based on its performance at the 2014 European Trampoline Championships.

Athlete	Event	Qualification				Final	
Athlete	Event	Routine 1	Routine 2	Total	Rank	Score	Rank
Léa Labrousse	Girls	41.980 4	50.660 4	92.640	5 Q	51.150	4

== Judo ==
France qualified two athletes based on its performance at the 2013 Cadet World Judo Championships.

Individual

Athlete	Event	Round of 32	Round of 16	Quarterfinals	Semifinals	Rep 1	Rep 2	Rep 3	Rep 4	Final / BM	Rank
Athlete	Event	Opposition Result	Opposition Result	Opposition Result	Opposition Result	Opposition Result	Opposition Result	Opposition Result	Opposition Result	Opposition Result	Rank
Jolan Florimont	Boys' -66 kg	Castro (GUM); W 100-000	Abe (JPN); L 000-100	Did not advance		Bye	Manzi (ITA); L 000-100	Did not advance			11
Morgane Duchêne	Girls' -78 kg	—N/a		de Bruine (AUS); W 100-000	Samardzic (BIH); L 000-100	—N/a				Rodríguez (VEN); L 001-100	5

Team

Athletes	Event	Round of 16	Quarterfinals	Semifinals	Final	Rank
Athletes	Event	Opposition Result	Opposition Result	Opposition Result	Opposition Result	Rank
Team Xian; Hifumi Abe (JPN); Chiara Carminucci (ITA); Naomi de Brune (AUS); Jolan Florimont (FRA); Brillith Gamarra (PER); Felix Penning (LUX); Marusa Stangar (SLO); Idan Vardi (ISR)	Mixed Team	Team Tani (MIX); W 7 – 0	Team Berghmans (MIX); W 4 – 3	Team Rougé (MIX); L 3 – 4	Did not advance	3rd place, bronze medalist(s)
Team Rougé; Morgane Duchêne (FRA); Ayelén Elizeche (ARG); Adrian Gandia (PUR); Mikhail Igolnikov (RUS); Lisa Millenberg (NED); Maria Siderot (POR); Sukhrob Tursunov (UZB)	Mixed Team	Team Kano (MIX); W 5-2	Team Ruska (MIX); W 5-2	Team Xian (MIX); W 4-3	Team Geesink (MIX); W 4-2	1st place, gold medalist(s)

== Modern Pentathlon ==
France qualified one athlete based on its performance at the 2014 Youth A World Championships and another based on the 1 June 2014 Olympic Youth A Pentathlon World Rankings.

Athlete	Event	Fencing Ranking Round (épée one touch)		Swimming (200 m freestyle)			Fencing Final round (épée one touch)			Combined: Shooting/Running (10 m air pistol)/(3000 m)			Total Points	Final Rank
Athlete	Event	Results	Rank	Time	Rank	Points	Results	Rank	Points	Time	Rank	Points	Total Points	Final Rank
Gabriel Cianelli	Boys' Individual				5	330								
Laure Roset	Girls' Individual				4	290			265					14
Unknown; Gabriel Cianelli (FRA)	Mixed Relay													
Laure Roset (FRA); Henry Choong (GBR)	Mixed Relay	18-28	22	1:55.12	1	355		22	237	12:41.33	15	539	1131	17

== Rowing ==
France qualified two boats based on its performance at the 2013 World Rowing Junior Championships.

Athlete	Event	Heats		Repechage		Semifinals		Final	
Athlete	Event	Time	Rank	Time	Rank	Time	Rank	Time	Rank
Maxime Ducret	Boys' Single Sculls								
Camille Juillet	Girls' Single Sculls						FA	3:53.80	3rd place, bronze medalist(s)

Qualification Legend: FA=Final A (medal); FB=Final B (non-medal); FC=Final C (non-medal); FD=Final D (non-medal); SA/B=Semifinals A/B; SC/D=Semifinals C/D; R=Repechage

== Rugby sevens ==
France qualified a boys' team based on its performance at the 2013 Rugby World Cup Sevens.

=== Boys' tournament ===
Roster

- Alex Arrate
- Faraj Fartass
- Alex Gracbling
- Alexandre Lagarde
- Martin Laveau
- Alexandre Nicque
- Alexandre Pilati
- Arthur Retière
- Alexandre Roumat
- Atila Septar
- Sacha Valleau
- Matthieu Voisin

Group stage

Pos	Team	Pld	W	D	L	PF	PA	PD	Pts
1	Argentina	5	5	0	0	145	34	+111	15
2	France	5	4	0	1	98	55	+43	13
3	Fiji	5	2	0	3	82	70	+12	9
4	Kenya	5	2	0	3	68	107	−39	9
5	Japan	5	2	0	3	73	131	−58	9
6	United States	5	0	0	5	59	128	−69	5

17 August 2014
11:30

Argentina	19 - 7	France

Youth Olympic Sports Park

17 August 2014
18:00

Kenya	0 - 24	France

Youth Olympic Sports Park

18 August 2014
10:30

Fiji	12 - 17	France

Youth Olympic Sports Park

18 August 2014
18:00

France	22 - 17	United States

Youth Olympic Sports Park

19 August 2014
10:30

France	28 - 7	Japan

Youth Olympic Sports Park

Semifinal

19 August 2014
15:30

France	34 - 12	Fiji

Youth Olympic Sports Park

Gold-medal match

20 August 2014
09:00

Argentina	22 - 45	France (gold)

Youth Olympic Sports Park

== Sailing ==
France qualified one boat based on its performance at the 2013 World Techno 293 Championships. Later France qualified two boats based on its performance at the Byte CII European Continental Qualifiers and one boat from the Techno 293 European Continental Qualifiers.

Athlete	Event	Race											Net Points	Final Rank
Athlete	Event	1	2	3	4	5	6	7	8	9	10	M*	Net Points	Final Rank
Romen Richard	Boys' Byte CII	14	6	10	8	11	4	(16)	9	Cancelled		78.00	62.00	9
Tom Monnet	Boys' Techno 293	4	9	4	(11)	5	1	1	Cancelled			35.00	24.00	4
Louise Cervera	Girls' Byte CII	(21)	8	8	19	14	13	20	9	Cancelled		112.00	91.00	15
Lucie Pianazza	Girls' Techno 293	2	3	4	3	4	(5)	4	Cancelled			25.00	20.00	3rd place, bronze medalist(s)

== Shooting ==
France qualified one shooter based on its performance at the 2014 European Shooting Championships.

Individual

Athlete	Event	Qualification		Final	
Athlete	Event	Points	Rank	Points	Rank
Edouard Dortomb	Boys' 10m Air Pistol	576	3 Q	178.6	3rd place, bronze medalist(s)

Team

Athletes	Event	Qualification		Round of 16	Quarterfinals	Semifinals	Final / BM	Rank
Athletes	Event	Points	Rank	Opposition Result	Opposition Result	Opposition Result	Opposition Result	Rank
Edouard Dortomb (FRA); Sara Stamnestro (NOR)	Mixed Team 10m Air Pistol							

== Swimming ==
France qualified eight swimmers.

Boys

Athlete	Event	Heat		Semifinal		Final	
Athlete	Event	Time	Rank	Time	Rank	Time	Rank
Rahiti de Vos	400 m freestyle	3:56.88	15	—N/a		Did not advance	
Rahiti de Vos	800 m freestyle	—N/a				8:11.82	11
Geoffroy Matthieu	200 m backstroke	2:04.61	14	—N/a		Did not advance	
Jean Dencausse	50 m breaststroke	29.34	22	Did not advance			
Jean Dencausse	100 m breaststroke	1:03.57	13 Q	1:03.94	16	Did not advance	
Jean Dencausse	200 m breaststroke	2:17.77	14	—N/a		Did not advance	
Guillaume Laure	200 m individual medley	2:06.13	13	—N/a		Did not advance	
Jean Dencausse; Rahiti de Vos; Geoffroy Mathieu; Guillaume Laure	4 × 100 m freestyle relay	3:31.67	9	—N/a		Did not advance	
Geoffroy Mathieu; Jean Dencausse; Guillaume Laure; Rahiti de Vos	4 × 100 m medley relay	3:53.50	5 Q	—N/a		3:48.80	5

Girls

Athlete	Event	Heat		Semifinal		Final	
Athlete	Event	Time	Rank	Time	Rank	Time	Rank
Emma Terebo	50 m freestyle	26.73	19	Did not advance			
Emma Terebo	50 m backstroke	29.93	19	Did not advance			
Emma Terebo	100 m backstroke	1:04.87	23	Did not advance			
Camille Wishaupt	400 m freestyle	4:28.69	25	—N/a		Did not advance	
Camille Wishaupt	100 m butterfly	1:02.66	18	Did not advance			
Camille Wishaupt	200 m butterfly	2:16.31	14	—N/a		Did not advance	
Pauline Mahieu	50 m backstroke	29.53	10 Q	29.66	13	Did not advance	
Chloé Cazier	50 m breaststroke	33.27	20	Did not advance			
Chloé Cazier	100 m breaststroke	1:14.46	25	Did not advance			

Mixed

Athlete	Event	Heat		Final	
Athlete	Event	Time	Rank	Time	Rank
Guillaume Laure; Emma Terebo; Pauline Mahieu; Jean Dencausse	4 × 100 m freestyle relay	3:42.17	14	Did not advance	
Pauline Mahieu; Jean Dencausse; Camille Wishaupt; Guillaume Laure	4 × 100 m medley relay	DSQ		Did not advance	

== Table Tennis ==
France qualified two athletes based on its performance at the European Qualification Event.

Singles

Athlete	Event	Group stage	Rank	Round of 16	Quarterfinals	Semifinals	Final / BM	Rank
Athlete	Event	Opposition Score	Rank	Opposition Score	Opposition Score	Opposition Score	Opposition Score	Rank
Can Akkuzu	Boys	Group G Yadav (IND); W 3 - 2	Q					
Can Akkuzu	Boys	Gerassimenko (KAZ)	Q					
Can Akkuzu	Boys	Avvari (USA); W 3 - 2	Q					
Audrey Zarif	Girls	Group D Kim (UZB)	qB	Edghill (GUY); W w/o	Wan (GER); L 0 - 4	Did not advance		19
Audrey Zarif	Girls	Zhang (USA); L 1 - 3	qB	Edghill (GUY); W w/o	Wan (GER); L 0 - 4	Did not advance		19
Audrey Zarif	Girls	Park (KOR)	qB	Edghill (GUY); W w/o	Wan (GER); L 0 - 4	Did not advance		19

Team

Athletes	Event	Group stage	Rank	Round of 16	Quarterfinals	Semifinals	Final / BM	Rank
Athletes	Event	Opposition Score	Rank	Opposition Score	Opposition Score	Opposition Score	Opposition Score	Rank
France; Audrey Zarif (FRA); Can Akkuzu (FRA)	Mixed	Egypt; Saad (EGY); Ghallab (EGY)	Q					
France; Audrey Zarif (FRA); Can Akkuzu (FRA)	Mixed	South Korea; Park (KOR); Kim (KOR)	Q					
France; Audrey Zarif (FRA); Can Akkuzu (FRA)	Mixed	Kazakhstan; Ryabova (KAZ); Gerassimenko (KAZ); W	Q					

Qualification Legend: Q=Main Bracket (medal); qB=Consolation Bracket (non-medal)

== Taekwondo ==
France qualified two athletes based on its performance at the Taekwondo Qualification Tournament.

Boys

Athlete	Event	Round of 16	Quarterfinals	Semifinals	Final	Rank
Athlete	Event	Opposition Result	Opposition Result	Opposition Result	Opposition Result	Rank
Stéphane Audibert	−48 kg	Logbo (CIV); W 10 - 6	Alsamih (KSA); W 10 - 5	Eshaghi (IRI); L 0 - 16 (PTG)	Did not advance	3rd place, bronze medalist(s)
Yoann Miangue	+73 kg			Liu (CHN); W 1 (SUD) - 0	Voronovskyy (UKR); W 6 - 3	1st place, gold medalist(s)

== Triathlon ==
France qualified one athlete based on its performance at the 2014 European Youth Olympic Games Qualifier.

Individual

Athlete	Event	Swim (750m)	Trans 1	Bike (20 km)	Trans 2	Run (5 km)	Total Time	Rank
Émilie Morier	Girls	10:29	00:46	31:22	00:27	17:51	1:00:44	3rd place, bronze medalist(s)

Relay

Athlete	Event	Total Times per Athlete (Swim 250m, Bike 6.6km, Run 1.8km)	Total Group Time	Rank
Europe 1 Kristin Ranwig (GER); Emil Deleuran Hansen (DEN); Emilie Morier (FRA); Ben Dijkstra (GBR)	Mixed Relay	21:49; 19:25; 21:43; 19:20	1:22:17	1st place, gold medalist(s)

== Weightlifting ==
France qualified 1 quota in the boys' events based on the team ranking after the 2014 Weightlifting Youth European Championships.

Boys

Athlete	Event	Snatch		Clean & jerk		Total	Rank
Athlete	Event	Result	Rank	Result	Rank	Total	Rank
Anthony Coullet	+85 kg	142	3	185	3	327	3rd place, bronze medalist(s)

== Wrestling ==
France qualified one athlete based on its performance at the 2014 European Cadet Championships.

Key:
- VT - Victory by Fall.
- PP - Decision by Points - the loser with technical points.
- PO - Decision by Points - the loser without technical points.

Girls

Athlete	Event	Group stage				Final / RM	Rank
Athlete	Event	Opposition Score	Opposition Score	Opposition Score	Rank	Opposition Score	Rank
Koumba Larroque	Freestyle -60kg	Nandzo (CGO); W 4 - 0	Bullen (NOR); L	Mane (IND); W 4 - 0 ^{VT}	2 Q	Parra (COL); W 4 - 0 ^{ST}	3rd place, bronze medalist(s)
