= Republic of the Congo at the 2014 Summer Youth Olympics =

- IOC code: CGO
- NOC: Comité National Olympique et Sportif Congolais

in Nanjing
- Competitors: 8 in 5 sports
- Medals: Gold 0 Silver 0 Bronze 0 Total 0

Summer Youth Olympics appearances
- 2010; 2014; 2018

Congo competed at the 2014 Summer Youth Olympics, in Nanjing, China from 16 August to 28 August 2014.

== Athletics ==
Congo qualified one athlete.

Qualification Legend: Q=Final A (medal); qB=Final B (non-medal); qC=Final C (non-medal); qD=Final D (non-medal); qE=Final E (non-medal)

Girls
Track & road events

Athlete	Event	Heats		Final	
Athlete	Event	Result	Rank	Result	Rank
Elche Limbouanga	100 m	12.97	19 qC	12.93	17

== Badminton ==
Congo was given a quota to compete by the tripartite committee.

Singles

Athlete	Event	Group stage				Quarterfinal	Semifinal	Final / BM	Rank
Athlete	Event	Opposition Score	Opposition Score	Opposition Score	Rank	Opposition Score	Opposition Score	Opposition Score	Rank
Devins Mananga Nzoussi	Boys' Singles	A Ginting (INA); L 0 – 2	S Dias (SRI); L 0 – 2	A Hussein (EGY); L 0 – 2	4	did not advance			

Doubles

Athlete	Event	Group stage				Quarterfinal	Semifinal	Final / BM	Rank
Athlete	Event	Opposition Score	Opposition Score	Opposition Score	Rank	Opposition Score	Opposition Score	Opposition Score	Rank
Mia Blichfeldt (DEN); Devins Mananga Nzoussi (CGO)	Mixed Doubles	R Hartawan (INA); D Guda (AUS); L 0 – 2	M Narongrit (THA); J Qin (CHN); L 0 – 2	L Penalver (ESP); C Cadeau (SEY); L 0 – 2	4	did not advance			

== Beach Volleyball ==
Congo qualified a boys' and girls' team by their performance at the CAVB Qualification Tournament.

Athletes	Event	Preliminary round	Standing	Round of 24	Round of 16	Quarterfinals	Semifinals	Final / BM	Rank
Athletes	Event	Opposition Score	Standing	Opposition Score	Opposition Score	Opposition Score	Opposition Score	Opposition Score	Rank
Moussa Botouli Ilombola; Johfrat Itoua Ossolo	Boys'	Moore/Robinson (NZL); L 0 – 2	5	did not advance					
Moussa Botouli Ilombola; Johfrat Itoua Ossolo	Boys'	Hutchinson/Bryan (JAM); W 2 – 0	5	did not advance					
Moussa Botouli Ilombola; Johfrat Itoua Ossolo	Boys'	Navickas/Vaskelis (LTU); L 0 – 2	5	did not advance					
Moussa Botouli Ilombola; Johfrat Itoua Ossolo	Boys'	Stadie/Rudolf (GER); L 0 – 2	5	did not advance					
Moussa Botouli Ilombola; Johfrat Itoua Ossolo	Boys'	Souto/Mariano (BRA); L 0 – 2	5	did not advance					
Ursia Moyipele; Petronie Nkoka Ndoungou	Girls'	Maida/Vargas (BOL); L 0 – 2	6	did not advance					
Ursia Moyipele; Petronie Nkoka Ndoungou	Girls'	Wang/Lvwen (CHN); W INJ	6	did not advance					
Ursia Moyipele; Petronie Nkoka Ndoungou	Girls'	Ward/Davidson (TRI); L 0 – 2	6	did not advance					
Ursia Moyipele; Petronie Nkoka Ndoungou	Girls'	Schneider/Arnholdt (GER); L 0 – 2	6	did not advance					
Ursia Moyipele; Petronie Nkoka Ndoungou	Girls'	Ragillia/Andriani (INA); L 0 – 2	6	did not advance					

== Table Tennis ==
Congo was given a quota to compete by the tripartite committee.

Singles

Athlete	Event	Group Stage	Rank	Round of 16	Quarterfinals	Semifinals	Final / BM	Rank
Athlete	Event	Opposition Score	Rank	Opposition Score	Opposition Score	Opposition Score	Opposition Score	Rank
Christ Bienatiki	Boys	Group A A Szudi (HUN); L 0 – 3	4 qB	M Allegro (BEL); L 1 – 3	did not advance			25
Christ Bienatiki	Boys	B Afanador (PUR); L 0 – 3	4 qB	M Allegro (BEL); L 1 – 3	did not advance			25
Christ Bienatiki	Boys	Z Fan (CHN); L 0 – 3	4 qB	M Allegro (BEL); L 1 – 3	did not advance			25

Team

Athletes	Event	Group Stage	Rank	Round of 16	Quarterfinals	Semifinals	Final / BM	Rank
Athletes	Event	Opposition Score	Rank	Opposition Score	Opposition Score	Opposition Score	Opposition Score	Rank
Africa 2 Florence Seera (UGA); Christ Bienatiki (CGO)	Mixed	Europe 2 N Trosman (ISR); E Ranefur (SWE); L w/o	4 qB	India; S Mukherjee (IND); A Yadav (IND); L w/o	did not advance			25
Africa 2 Florence Seera (UGA); Christ Bienatiki (CGO)	Mixed	United States; L Zhang (USA); K Avvari (USA); L w/o	4 qB	India; S Mukherjee (IND); A Yadav (IND); L w/o	did not advance			25
Africa 2 Florence Seera (UGA); Christ Bienatiki (CGO)	Mixed	Chinese Taipei; S Chiu (TPE); H Yang (TPE); L w/o	4 qB	India; S Mukherjee (IND); A Yadav (IND); L w/o	did not advance			25

Qualification Legend: Q=Main Bracket (medal); qB=Consolation Bracket (non-medal)

== Wrestling ==
Congo was given an invitation to compete from the Tripartite Commission.

Key:

- VT - Victory by Fall.
- PP - Decision by Points - the loser with technical points.
- PO - Decision by Points - the loser without technical points.

Girls

Athlete	Event	Group stage				Final / RM	Rank
Athlete	Event	Opposition Score	Opposition Score	Opposition Score	Rank	Opposition Score	Rank
Noelle Mbouma Nandzo	Freestyle -60kg	K Larroque (FRA); L 0 – 4	R Mane (IND); L 1 – 3	G Bullen (NOR); L 0 – 4	4 Q	M Aquino (GUM); L 0 – 4	8
