= Edvinas =

- Gender: Male

Origin
- Origin: Edwin
- Meaning: "rich friend"
- Region of origin: Lithuania

Edvinas, a cognate of the English language name Edwin, may refer to:

- Edvinas Dautartas (born 1987), swimmer
- Edvinas Gertmonas (born 1996), football player
- Edvinas Krungolcas (born 1973), modern pentathlete
- Edvinas Ramanauskas (born 1985), sprint canoer
- Edvinas Šeškus (born 1995), basketball player
- Edvinas Vaškelis (born 1996), volleyball player
