= Puerto Rico at the 2014 Summer Youth Olympics =

- IOC code: PUR
- NOC: Puerto Rico Olympic Committee

in Nanjing
- Competitors: 23 in 10 sports
- Medals: Gold 0 Silver 0 Bronze 0 Total 0

Summer Youth Olympics appearances
- 2010; 2014; 2018; 2026

Puerto Rico competed at the 2014 Summer Youth Olympics, in Nanjing, China from 16 August to 28 August 2014.

== Athletics ==
Puerto Rico qualified six athletes.

Qualification Legend: Q=Final A (medal); qB=Final B (non-medal); qC=Final C (non-medal); qD=Final D (non-medal); qE=Final E (non-medal)

Boys
Track & road events

Athlete	Event	Heats		Final	
Athlete	Event	Result	Rank	Result	Rank
Jorge Ely Sanchez Davila	200 m	DNF qC		DNS	
Ezequiel Suarez Hidalgo	400 m	48.53 PB	10 qB	49.27	13
Dangel Cotto Serrano	400 m hurdles	53.99	13 qB	52.50 PB	10

Field Events

Athlete	Event	Qualification		Final	
Athlete	Event	Distance	Rank	Distance	Rank
Edilberto González	Shot put	16.67	14 qB	16.90	6

Girls
Track & road events

Athlete	Event	Heats		Final	
Athlete	Event	Result	Rank	Result	Rank
Keysha Dumeng	400 m hurdles	1:02.21 PB	13 qB	1:02.63	5
Alondra Negron	2000 m steeplechase	6:46.98 PB	7 Q	6:44.46 PB	6

== Basketball ==
Puerto Rico qualified a boys' team based on the 1 June 2014 FIBA 3x3 National Federation Rankings.

Skills Competition

Athlete	Event	Qualification				Final			
Athlete	Event	Round 1	Round 2	Total	Rank	Round 1	Round 2	Total	Rank
Albert Roque Baez	Boys' Dunk Contest	0	17	17	17	did not advance			
Pedro Villaman Pastrano	Boys' Dunk Contest	22	25	47	8	did not advance			

=== Boys' tournament ===
Roster

- Luis Gonzalez Parrilla
- Antonio Ralat Troncoso
- Albert Roque Baez
- Pedro Villaman Pastrano

Group Stage

Pos	Team	Pld	W	L	PF	PA	PD	Pts	Qualification
1	Lithuania	9	9	0	165	129	+36	18	Round of 16
2	Slovenia	9	7	2	152	120	+32	16	Round of 16
3	China	9	6	3	164	143	+21	15 (Note: CHN +1, PUR −1)	Round of 16
4	Puerto Rico	9	6	3	152	136	+16	15	Round of 16
5	Poland	9	5	4	153	127	+26	14	Round of 16
6	France	9	4	5	151	127	+24	13	Round of 16
7	Hungary	9	3	6	158	165	−7	12	Round of 16
8	Uruguay	9	2	7	103	154	−51	11 (Note: URU +1, GER −1)	Round of 16
9	Germany	9	2	7	118	149	−31	11	Eliminated
10	Indonesia	9	1	8	86	152	−66	10	Eliminated

Notes:

18 August 2014
18:00

Lithuania	17–14	Puerto Rico

Wutaishan Sports Center, Nanjing

18 August 2014
20:40

Puerto Rico	22–20	Poland

Wutaishan Sports Center, Nanjing

19 August 2014
20:00

France	15–8	Puerto Rico

Wutaishan Sports Center, Nanjing

20 August 2014
17:40

Slovenia	12–16	Puerto Rico

Wutaishan Sports Center, Nanjing

20 August 2014
21:40

Puerto Rico	'15–13	Indonesia

Wutaishan Sports Center, Nanjing

22 August 2014
19:00

China	19–18	Puerto Rico

Wutaishan Sports Center, Nanjing

23 August 2014
18:00

Puerto Rico	19–15	Hungary

Wutaishan Sports Center, Nanjing

23 August 2014
21:00

Germany	12–19	Puerto Rico

Wutaishan Sports Center, Nanjing

24 August 2014
18:40

Puerto Rico	21–13	Uruguay

Wutaishan Sports Center, Nanjing

Knockout Stage

Round of 16	Quarterfinals	Semifinals	Final	Rank
Opposition Score	Opposition Score	Opposition Score	Opposition Score	Rank
Venezuela; L 18-20	Did not advance			13

== Beach Volleyball ==
Puerto Rico qualified a boys' and girls' team by their performance at the NORCECA Final YOG Qualifier.

Athletes	Event	Preliminary round	Standing	Round of 24	Round of 16	Quarterfinals	Semifinals	Final / BM	Rank
Athletes	Event	Opposition Score	Standing	Opposition Score	Opposition Score	Opposition Score	Opposition Score	Opposition Score	Rank
Sergio Figueroa Velez; Daniel Rivera Aparicio	Boys'	Sahneh – Shobeiri (IRI); W 2 - 0	Q	Bye	Berntsen – Mol (NOR); W 2 - 0	Gomez – Hernandez (VEN); L 1 - 2	did not advance		9
Sergio Figueroa Velez; Daniel Rivera Aparicio	Boys'	Amissah – Tetteh (GHA); W 2 - 0	Q	Bye	Berntsen – Mol (NOR); W 2 - 0	Gomez – Hernandez (VEN); L 1 - 2	did not advance		9
Sergio Figueroa Velez; Daniel Rivera Aparicio	Boys'	Bramont – Heredia (PER)	Q	Bye	Berntsen – Mol (NOR); W 2 - 0	Gomez – Hernandez (VEN); L 1 - 2	did not advance		9
Sergio Figueroa Velez; Daniel Rivera Aparicio	Boys'	Gauthier – Loiseau (FRA); W 2 - 1	Q	Bye	Berntsen – Mol (NOR); W 2 - 0	Gomez – Hernandez (VEN); L 1 - 2	did not advance		9
Sergio Figueroa Velez; Daniel Rivera Aparicio	Boys'	Rosa – Sweeney (ISV); W 2 - 0	Q	Bye	Berntsen – Mol (NOR); W 2 - 0	Gomez – Hernandez (VEN); L 1 - 2	did not advance		9
Lina Bernier Colon; Valeria Cajigas Medina	Girls'	Daniel – Joe (VAN); W 2-0 (21–16, 21–14)	3 Q	Andriani – Ragillia (INA); W 2 - 0 (21–15, 21–11)	Ramos – Lisboa (BRA); L 0 - 2 (16–21, 12–21)	did not advance			17
Lina Bernier Colon; Valeria Cajigas Medina	Girls'	Makroguzova – Rugykh (RUS)	3 Q	Andriani – Ragillia (INA); W 2 - 0 (21–15, 21–11)	Ramos – Lisboa (BRA); L 0 - 2 (16–21, 12–21)	did not advance			17
Lina Bernier Colon; Valeria Cajigas Medina	Girls'	Mukantambara – Uwimbabazi (RWA)	3 Q	Andriani – Ragillia (INA); W 2 - 0 (21–15, 21–11)	Ramos – Lisboa (BRA); L 0 - 2 (16–21, 12–21)	did not advance			17
Lina Bernier Colon; Valeria Cajigas Medina	Girls'	Hiruela – Verasio (ARG); L 1-2 (21–23, 21–10, 11–15)	3 Q	Andriani – Ragillia (INA); W 2 - 0 (21–15, 21–11)	Ramos – Lisboa (BRA); L 0 - 2 (16–21, 12–21)	did not advance			17
Lina Bernier Colon; Valeria Cajigas Medina	Girls'	Bell – Kendall (AUS); W 2-1 (19–21, 21–14, 15–11)	3 Q	Andriani – Ragillia (INA); W 2 - 0 (21–15, 21–11)	Ramos – Lisboa (BRA); L 0 - 2 (16–21, 12–21)	did not advance			17

== Fencing ==
Puerto Rico qualified one athlete based on its performance at the 2014 FIE Cadet World Championships

Girls

Athlete	Event	Pool Round	Seed	Round of 16	Quarterfinals	Semifinals	Final / BM	Rank
Athlete	Event	Opposition Score	Seed	Opposition Score	Opposition Score	Opposition Score	Opposition Score	Rank
Marie Colon	Sabre	Záhonyi (HUN) Crovari (ITA) Jeon (KOR) Toledo (MEX) Boungab (ALG)						

Mixed Team

Athletes	Event	Round of 16	Quarterfinals	Semifinals / PM	Final / PM	Rank
Athletes	Event	Opposition Score	Opposition Score	Opposition Score	Opposition Score	Rank
Americas 2 Dylan French (CAN); Gabriela Cecchini (BRA); Karol Metryka (USA); Tia Simms-Lymn (JAM); Pedro Marostega (BRA); Aydill-Marie Colon Quinones (PUR)	Mixed Team	Africa; W 30–20	Europe 1 L 29–30	Europe 3 W 30–29	Europe 4 W 30–28	5

== Gymnastics ==
=== Artistic Gymnastics ===
Puerto Rico qualified two athletes based on its performance at the 2014 Junior Pan American Artistic Gymnastics Championships.

Boys

Athlete	Event	Apparatus						Total	Rank
Athlete	Event	F	PH	R	V	PB	HB	Total	Rank
Andres Perez Gines	Qualification	12.150 36	11.100 31	10.850 37	13.950 17	12.675 19	12.900 15	73.625	30

Girls

Athlete	Event	Apparatus				Total	Rank
Athlete	Event	V	UB	BB	F	Total	Rank
Paola Moreira Irizarry	Qualification	13.500 18	10.500 24	11.700 26	12.100 17	47.800	22

== Judo ==
Puerto Rico qualified two athletes based on its performance at the 2013 Cadet World Judo Championships.

Individual

Athlete	Event	Round of 32	Round of 16	Quarterfinals	Semifinals	Rep 1	Rep 2	Rep 3	Rep 4	Final / BM	Rank
Athlete	Event	Opposition Result	Opposition Result	Opposition Result	Opposition Result	Opposition Result	Opposition Result	Opposition Result	Opposition Result	Opposition Result	Rank
Adrian Gandia	Boys' -66 kg	Zadro (BIH); W 010-000	Iadov (UKR); L 000-001	did not advance		Dermishyan (ARM); L 001-100	did not advance				17
Paola Acevedo	Girls' -52 kg	—N/a	Mondelly (HAI); W 101-000	Janashvili (GEO); L 000-100	Did not advance	—N/a		Tseregbaatar (MGL); L 000-000	did not advance		11

Team

Athletes	Event	Round of 16	Quarterfinals	Semifinals	Final	Rank
Athletes	Event	Opposition Result	Opposition Result	Opposition Result	Opposition Result	Rank
Team Rouge; Morgane Duchene (FRA); Ayelén Elizeche (ARG); Adrian Gandia (PUR); Mikhail Igolnikov (RUS); Lisa Millenberg (NED); Maria Siderot (POR); Sukhrob Tursunov (UZB)	Mixed Team	Team Kano (MIX); W 5–2	Team Ruska (MIX); W 5–2	Team Xian (MIX); W 4–3	Team Geesink (MIX); W 4–2	1st place, gold medalist(s)
Team Van De Walle; Paola Acevedo (PUR); Leyla Aliyeva (AZE); Nokutula Banda (ZAM); Marco Montoya (COL); Ivan Silva Morales (CUB); Unelle Snyman (RSA); Peta Zadro (BIH)	Mixed Team	Bye	Team Geesink (MIX); L 3 – 4	did not advance		5

== Sailing ==
Puerto Rico was given a reallocation boat based on being a top ranked nation not yet qualified.

Athlete	Event	Race											Net Points	Final Rank
Athlete	Event	1	2	3	4	5	6	7	8	9	10	M*	Net Points	Final Rank
Lucas Miranda Martinez	Boys' Techno 293	19	16	19	16	17	(20)	16	Cancelled			123.00	103.00	19

== Swimming ==
Puerto Rico qualified one swimmer.

Boys

Athlete	Event	Heat		Semifinal		Final	
Athlete	Event	Time	Rank	Time	Rank	Time	Rank
Yeziel Morales Miranda	100 m backstroke	57.79	23	did not advance			
Yeziel Morales Miranda	200 m backstroke	2:08.92	27	—N/a		did not advance	
Yeziel Morales Miranda	200 m butterfly	2:05.99	18	—N/a		did not advance	
Yeziel Morales Miranda	200 m individual medley	2:09.97	20	—N/a		did not advance	

== Table Tennis ==
Puerto Rico qualified one athlete based on its performance at the Latin American Qualification Event.

Singles

Athlete	Event	Group Stage	Rank	Round of 16	Quarterfinals	Semifinals	Final / BM	Rank
Athlete	Event	Opposition Score	Rank	Opposition Score	Opposition Score	Opposition Score	Opposition Score	Rank
Brian Afanador	Boys	Group A Fan (CHN); L 1 - 3	2 Q	Muramatsu (JPN); L 0 - 4	did not advance			16
Brian Afanador	Boys	Bienatiki (CGO); W 3 – 0	2 Q	Muramatsu (JPN); L 0 - 4	did not advance			16
Brian Afanador	Boys	Szudi (HUN); W	2 Q	Muramatsu (JPN); L 0 - 4	did not advance			16

Team

Athletes	Event	Group Stage	Rank	Round of 16	Quarterfinals	Semifinals	Final / BM	Rank
Athletes	Event	Opposition Score	Rank	Opposition Score	Opposition Score	Opposition Score	Opposition Score	Rank
Intercontinental 1 Anqi Luo (CAN); Brian Afanador (PUR)	Mixed	Africa 3 Salah (DJI); Alassani (TOG); W 3 - 0	2 Q	China; Liu (CHN); Fan (CHN); L 0 - 2	did not advance			9
Intercontinental 1 Anqi Luo (CAN); Brian Afanador (PUR)	Mixed	Japan; Kato (JPN); Muramatsu (JPN); L	2 Q	China; Liu (CHN); Fan (CHN); L 0 - 2	did not advance			9
Intercontinental 1 Anqi Luo (CAN); Brian Afanador (PUR)	Mixed	India; Mukherjee (IND); Yadav (IND); W 2 - 1	2 Q	China; Liu (CHN); Fan (CHN); L 0 - 2	did not advance			9

Qualification Legend: Q=Main Bracket (medal); qB=Consolation Bracket (non-medal)

== Taekwondo ==
Puerto Rico qualified one athlete based on its performance at the Taekwondo Qualification Tournament.

Girls

Athlete	Event	Round of 16	Quarterfinals	Semifinals	Final	Rank
Athlete	Event	Opposition Result	Opposition Result	Opposition Result	Opposition Result	Rank
Crystal Weekes Gonzalez	+63 kg					
