= Virgin Islands at the 2014 Summer Youth Olympics =

- IOC code: ISV
- NOC: Virgin Islands Olympic Committee

in Nanjing
- Competitors: 5 in 3 sports
- Medals: Gold 0 Silver 0 Bronze 0 Total 0

Summer Youth Olympics appearances
- 2010; 2014; 2018; 2026

The United States Virgin Islands competed at the 2014 Summer Youth Olympics held in Nanjing, China from 16 August to 28 August 2014.

== Athletics ==
Virgin Islands qualified one athlete.

Qualification Legend: Q=Final A (medal); qB=Final B (non-medal); qC=Final C (non-medal); qD=Final D (non-medal); qE=Final E (non-medal)

Boys
Track & road events

Athlete	Event	Heats		Final	
Athlete	Event	Result	Rank	Result	Rank
Kohun Eugene	200 m	22.60	20 qC	22.84	17

== Beach Volleyball ==
Virgin Islands was given a team to compete from the tripartite committee.

Athletes	Event	Preliminary round	Standing	Round of 24	Round of 16	Quarterfinals	Semifinals	Final / BM	Rank
Athletes	Event	Opposition Score	Standing	Opposition Score	Opposition Score	Opposition Score	Opposition Score	Opposition Score	Rank
Carlos Rosa; Ajia Sweeney	Boys'	Bramont-Arias/Heredia (PER); L 0 – 2	6	did not advance					
Carlos Rosa; Ajia Sweeney	Boys'	Gathier/Loiseau (FRA); L 0 – 2	6	did not advance					
Carlos Rosa; Ajia Sweeney	Boys'	Amissah/Tetteh (GHA); L 1 – 2	6	did not advance					
Carlos Rosa; Ajia Sweeney	Boys'	Shobeiri/Sahneh (IRI); L 0 – 2	6	did not advance					
Carlos Rosa; Ajia Sweeney	Boys'	Figueroa/Rivera (PUR); L 0 – 2	6	did not advance					

== Sailing ==
Virgin Islands qualified two boats based on its performance at the Byte CII North American & Caribbean Continental Qualifiers.

Athlete	Event	Race											Net Points	Final Rank
Athlete	Event	1	2	3	4	5	6	7	8	9	10	M*	Net Points	Final Rank
Scott McKenzie	Boys' Byte CII	19	19	5	1	6	19	~~29~~	CAN			22	91	14
Paige Clarke	Girls' Byte CII	16	12	~~23~~	4	19	12	19	CAN			14	96	16
