= Ghana at the 2014 Summer Youth Olympics =

- IOC code: GHA
- NOC: Ghana Olympic Committee

in Nanjing
- Competitors: 10 in 5 sports
- Medals Ranked 49th: Gold 1 Silver 0 Bronze 0 Total 1

Summer Youth Olympics appearances
- 2010; 2014; 2018; 2026

Ghana competed at the 2014 Summer Youth Olympics, in Nanjing, China from 16 August to 28 August 2014.

== Medalists ==
Medal	Name	Sport	Event	Date
Gold	Martha Bissah	Athletics	Girls' 800 m	23 August

== Athletics ==
Ghana qualified two athletes.

Qualification Legend: Q=Final A (medal); qB=Final B (non-medal); qC=Final C (non-medal); qD=Final D (non-medal); qE=Final E (non-medal)

Boys
Field Events

Athlete	Event	Qualification		Final	
Athlete	Event	Distance	Rank	Distance	Rank
Precious Attipoe	Triple jump	15.08	8 Q	14.64	8

Girls
Track & road events

Athlete	Event	Heats		Final	
Athlete	Event	Result	Rank	Result	Rank
Martha Bissah	800 m	2:07.67	2 Q	2:04.90	1st place, gold medalist(s)

== Badminton ==
Ghana was given a quota to compete by the tripartite committee.

Singles

Athlete	Event	Group stage				Quarterfinal	Semifinal	Final / BM	Rank
Athlete	Event	Opposition Score	Opposition Score	Opposition Score	Rank	Opposition Score	Opposition Score	Opposition Score	Rank
Abraham Ayittey	Boys' Singles	Y Shi (CHN); L w/o	B Ong (SIN); L w/o	Seo (KOR); L w/o	4	did not advance			

Doubles

Athlete	Event	Group stage				Quarterfinal	Semifinal	Final / BM	Rank
Athlete	Event	Opposition Score	Opposition Score	Opposition Score	Rank	Opposition Score	Opposition Score	Opposition Score	Rank
Ruthvika Shivani (IND); Abraham Ayittey (GHA)	Mixed Doubles	T Hendahewa (SRI); B Ong (SIN); L w/o	L Courtois (FRA); D Sebunnya (UGA); L w/o	He Bingjiao (CHN); Sanchin Dias (SRI); L w/o	4	did not advance			

== Beach Volleyball ==
Ghana qualified a boys' and girls' team by their performance at the CAVB Qualification Tournament.

Athletes	Event	Preliminary round	Standing	Round of 24	Round of 16	Quarterfinals	Semifinals	Final / BM	Rank
Athletes	Event	Opposition Score	Standing	Opposition Score	Opposition Score	Opposition Score	Opposition Score	Opposition Score	Rank
Philip Amissah; Nicholas Tetteh	Boys'	Gathier/Loiseau (FRA); L 0 – 2	3 Q	MacNeil/Richards (CAN); L 0 – 2	did not advance				17
Philip Amissah; Nicholas Tetteh	Boys'	Figueroa/Rivera (PUR); L 0 – 2	3 Q	MacNeil/Richards (CAN); L 0 – 2	did not advance				17
Philip Amissah; Nicholas Tetteh	Boys'	Rosa/Sweeney (ISV); W 2 – 1	3 Q	MacNeil/Richards (CAN); L 0 – 2	did not advance				17
Philip Amissah; Nicholas Tetteh	Boys'	Bramon-Arias/Heredia (PER); W 2 – 1	3 Q	MacNeil/Richards (CAN); L 0 – 2	did not advance				17
Philip Amissah; Nicholas Tetteh	Boys'	Shobeiri/Sahneh (IRI); W INJ	3 Q	MacNeil/Richards (CAN); L 0 – 2	did not advance				17
Doris Douduwa; Esther Essumang	Girls'	Radl/Gesslbauer (AUT); L 0 – 2	6	did not advance					
Doris Douduwa; Esther Essumang	Girls'	Tangkaeo/Kawfong (THA); L 0 – 2	6	did not advance					
Doris Douduwa; Esther Essumang	Girls'	Mongelos/Valiente (PAR); L 0 – 2	6	did not advance					
Doris Douduwa; Esther Essumang	Girls'	Richard/Placette (FRA); L 0 – 2	6	did not advance					
Doris Douduwa; Esther Essumang	Girls'	Giron/Bethancourt (GUA); L 0 – 2	6	did not advance					

== Swimming ==
Ghana qualified two swimmers.

Boys

Athlete	Event	Heat		Semifinal		Final	
Athlete	Event	Time	Rank	Time	Rank	Time	Rank
Kwaku Addo	50 m freestyle	24.66	38	did not advance			
Kwaku Addo	50 m butterfly	27.45	41	did not advance			

Girls

Athlete	Event	Heat		Semifinal		Final	
Athlete	Event	Time	Rank	Time	Rank	Time	Rank
Ophelia Swayne	50 m freestyle	28.76	37	did not advance			
Ophelia Swayne	50 m butterfly	29.51	27	did not advance			

== Weightlifting ==
Ghana was given a quota to compete in a girls' event by the tripartite committee.

Girls

Athlete	Event	Snatch		Clean & jerk		Total	Rank
Athlete	Event	Result	Rank	Result	Rank	Total	Rank
Juliana Arkoh	−63 kg	62	8	82	8	144	8
