= Brazil at the 2014 Summer Youth Olympics =

- IOC code: BRA
- NOC: Brazilian Olympic Committee
- Website: www.cob.org.br (in Portuguese)

in Nanjing
- Competitors: 97 in 21 sports
- Flag bearer: Marcus Vinícius D'Almeida
- Medals Ranked 9th: Gold 6 Silver 6 Bronze 1 Total 13

Summer Youth Olympics appearances (overview)
- 2010; 2014; 2018

Brazil competes at the 2014 Summer Youth Olympics, in Nanjing, China from 16 August to 28 August 2014.

== Medalists ==
Medals awarded to participants of mixed-NOC (combined) teams are represented in italics. These medals are not counted towards the individual NOC medal tally.

Medal	Name	Sport	Event	Date
Gold	Layana Colman	Judo	Girls' −52kg	17 Aug
Gold	Edival Pontes	Taekwondo	Boys' −63kg	19 Aug
Gold	Matheus Santana	Swimming	Boys' 100m freestyle	22 Aug
Gold	Orlando Luz; Marcelo Zormann	Tennis	Boys' doubles	24 Aug
Gold	Flávia Saraiva	Gymnastics	Girls' floor	24 Aug
Gold	Ana Patricia Ramos; Eduarda Lisboa	Beach volleyball	Girls' tournament	26 Aug
Silver	Matheus Santana; Luiz Altamir Melo; Natalia de Luccas; Giovanna Diamante	Swimming	Mixed 4 × 100 m freestyle relay	16 Aug
Silver	Matheus Santana	Swimming	Boys' 50m freestyle	20 Aug
Silver	Bianca de Souza Rodrigues	Equestrian	Team jumping	20 Aug
Silver	Flávia Saraiva	Gymnastics	Girls' artistic individual all-around	20 Aug
Silver	Layana Colman	Judo	Mixed team	21 Aug
Silver	Orlando Luz	Tennis	Boys' singles	23 Aug
Silver	Flávia Saraiva	Gymnastics	Girls' balance beam	24 Aug
Silver	Marcus Vinícius D'Almeida	Archery	Boys' individual	26 Aug
Bronze	Hugo Calderano	Table tennis	Boys' singles	20 Aug

== Archery ==
Brazil managed to qualify 2 quota places for archery, 1 quota place for the boys' events and another for the girls' events.

Individual

Athlete	Event	Ranking round		Round of 32	Round of 16	Quarterfinals	Semifinals	Final / BM	Rank
Athlete	Event	Score	Seed	Opposition Score	Opposition Score	Opposition Score	Opposition Score	Opposition Score	Rank
Marcus Vinícius D’Almeida	Boys' individual	683	3	Luis Gabriel Moreno (PHI) (30); W 6–0	Rick Martens (BEL) (14); W 6–4	Bradley Denny (GBR) (11); W 6–0	Atul Verma (IND) (2); W 6–4	Woo Seok Lee (KOR) (1); L 7–3	2nd place, silver medalist(s)
Ana Clara Machado	Girls' individual	627	18	Tuokkola (FIN) (15); W 7–3	Choirunisa (INA) (2); W 6–5	Zyzanska (POL) (10); W 6–5	Jiaman (CHN) (3); L 2–6	Lee (KOR) (3); L 1–7	4

Team

Athletes	Event	Ranking round		Round of 32	Round of 16	Quarterfinals	Semifinals	Final / BM	Rank
Athletes	Event	Score	Seed	Opposition Score	Opposition Score	Opposition Score	Opposition Score	Opposition Score	Rank
Marcus Vinicius D'Almeida (BRA); Aruzhan Abdrazak (KAZ)	Mixed team	1261	29	Florian Faber (SUI); Ralitsa Gencheva (BUL) (4); W 6–0	Damyan Dachev (BUL); Herna Latha Boda (IND) (13); W 6–2	Eric Peters (CAN); Mirjam Tuokkola (FIN) (12); L 2–6	did not advance		6
Ana Machado (BRA); Marek Szafran (POL)	Mixed team	1289	7	Jose Capote (VEN); Tanya Giaccheri (ITA) (26); W 5–3	Bradley Denny (GBR); Miasa Koike (JPN) (10); L 2–6	did not advance			9

== Athletics ==
Brazil qualified 17 athletes to compete in the following events.

Qualification Legend: Q=Final A (medal); qB=Final B (non-medal); qC=Final C (non-medal); qD=Final D (non-medal); qE=Final E (non-medal)

Boys
Track & road events

Athlete	Event	Heats		Final	
Athlete	Event	Result	Rank	Result	Rank
Aliffer Júnior dos Santos	200 m	21.64	9 qB	21.68	7
Anderson Cerqueira	400 m	48.07	7 Q	47.81	7
Vitor Venâncio	110 m hurdles	13.91	13 qB	13.81	9
Mikael de Jesus	400 m hurdles	51.12 PB	2 Q	51.30	4
Daniel de Nascimento	2000 m steeplechase	5:46.92	9 qB	6:01.84	10

Field events

Athlete	Event	Qualification		Final	
Athlete	Event	Distance	Rank	Distance	Rank
Kelves dos Santos	Long jump	6.48	12 qB	DNS	
Danilo Cardoso	High jump	1.95	15 qB	2.05 PB	10
Bruno Spinelli	Pole vault	4.80	5 Q	4.85	5
Maycon Bonadeo	Discus throw	51.65	14 qB	54.15	11

Girls
Track & road events

Athlete	Event	Heats		Final	
Athlete	Event	Result	Rank	Result	Rank
Mirna Marques da Silva	100 m	11.95	11 qB	12.12	11
Daysiellen Atla Dias	200 m	24.70	6 Q	24.73	6
Ana Karolyne Silva	800 m	2:11.29	11 qB	2:11.27	11
Paolla Luchin	100 m hurdles	14.32	15 qC	14.16	13
Maria Letícia Peres	400 m hurdles	1:01.52	11 qB	1:02.28	11

Field events

Athlete	Event	Qualification		Final	
Athlete	Event	Distance	Position	Distance	Position
Elen Vasconcelos	Long jump	5.57	10 qB	5.60	10
Thais Lindemayer Gomes	Pole vault	3.20	13 qB	NM	
Alexandra Pimenta da Silva	Javelin throw	48.28	9 Q	47.54	8

== Badminton ==
Brazil qualified one athlete based on the 2 May 2014 BWF junior world rankings.

singles

Athlete	Event	Group stage				Quarterfinal	Semifinal	Final / BM	Rank
Athlete	Event	Opposition Score	Opposition Score	Opposition Score	Rank	Opposition Score	Opposition Score	Opposition Score	Rank
Ygor Coelho de Oliveira	Boys' singles	Garrido Esquivel (MEX) W 2–0 (21–19, 21–16)	Lin (CHN) L 0–2 (19–21, 17–21)	Lu (TPE) L 0–2 (19–14, 17–11)	3	did not advance			

doubles

Athlete	Event	Group stage				Quarterfinal	Semifinal	Final / BM	Rank
Athlete	Event	Opposition Score	Opposition Score	Opposition Score	Rank	Opposition Score	Opposition Score	Opposition Score	Rank
Vladyslava Lesnaya (UKR); Ygor Coelho de Oliveira (BRA)	Mixed doubles	Vlaar (NED); Lais (AUT) L 0–2 (11–21, 19–21)	Seo (KOR); Doha (EGY) W 2–0 (21–16, 21–15)	Shi (CHN); Lai (AUS) L 0–2 (19–21, 14–21)	3	did not advance			

== Basketball ==
Brazil qualified a boys' and girls' based on the 1 June 2014 FIBA 3x3 National Federation Rankings.

Skills Competition

Athlete	Event	Qualification				Final			
Athlete	Event	Round 1	Round 2	Total	Rank	Round 1	Round 2	Total	Rank
Felipe Eduardo Oliveira da Penha	Boys' dunk contest	0	24	24	14	did not advance			
Gabriel Jonathan Queiroz Ferreira	Boys' dunk contest	0	22	22	15	did not advance			

Athlete	Event	Qualification			Final		
Athlete	Event	Points	Time	Rank	Points	Time	Rank
Tanya Fernanda dos Reis	Girls' Shoot-out Contest	DNS			did not advance		
Mayara Cristina Leoncio Marins	Girls' Shoot-out Contest	2	22.2	49	did not advance		
Mariana Moura Queiroz Dias	Girls' Shoot-out Contest	2	26.1	52	did not advance		
Leticia Cristina Soares Josefino	Girls' Shoot-out Contest	3	23.7	33	did not advance		

=== Boys' tournament ===
Roster

- Caique Cardoso Santana
- Felipe Oliveira da Penha
- Igor Pereira Cabral
- Gabriel Queiroz Ferreira

Group stage

Pos	Team	Pld	W	L	PF	PA	PD	Pts	Qualification
1	Argentina	9	7	2	156	101	+55	16	Round of 16
2	Russia	9	7	2	153	117	+36	16	Round of 16
3	Spain	9	7	2	145	135	+10	16	Round of 16
4	New Zealand	9	6	3	145	129	+16	15	Round of 16
5	Venezuela	9	5	4	136	128	+8	14	Round of 16
6	Brazil	9	4	5	116	92	+24	13 (Note: BRA +5, ROU −5)	Round of 16
7	Romania	9	4	5	130	122	+8	13	Round of 16
8	Tunisia	9	3	6	115	130	−15	12	Round of 16
9	Andorra	9	2	7	129	168	−39	11	Eliminated
10	Guatemala	9	0	9	74	177	−103	9	Eliminated

Notes:

18 August 2014
17:40

Brazil	10–16	Argentina

Wutaishan Sports Center, Nanjing

18 August 2014
20:20

Tunisia	14–13	Brazil

Wutaishan Sports Center, Nanjing

19 August 2014
19:00

Brazil	21–2	Andorra

Wutaishan Sports Center, Nanjing

20 August 2014
18:20

Spain	12–11	Brazil

Wutaishan Sports Center, Nanjing

20 August 2014
21:00

Brazil	8–14	Russia

Wutaishan Sports Center, Nanjing

22 August 2014
20:00

Brazil	12–7	Romania

Wutaishan Sports Center, Nanjing

23 August 2014
17:20

New Zealand	8–9	Brazil

Wutaishan Sports Center, Nanjing

23 August 2014
20:20

Brazil	19–4	Guatemala

Wutaishan Sports Center, Nanjing

24 August 2014
18:40

Venezuela	15–13	Brazil

Wutaishan Sports Center, Nanjing

L16-Final

25 August 2014
19:20

Brazil	12–11	China

Wutaishan Sports Center, Nanjing

Quarter-Final

25 August 2014
21:30

Brazil	8–12	Russia

Wutaishan Sports Center, Nanjing

Knockout Stage

Round of 16	Quarterfinals	Semifinals	Final	Rank
Opposition Score	Opposition Score	Opposition Score	Opposition Score	Rank
China; W 12-11	Russia; L 8–12	did not advance		7

=== Girls' tournament ===
Roster

- Tayna dos Reis
- Mayara Leoncio Marins
- Mariana Moura Queiroz Dias
- Leticia Soares Josefino

Group stage

Pos	Team	Pld	W	D	L	PF	PA	PD	Pts	Qualification
1	Netherlands	9	8	0	1	164	87	+77	24	Round of 16
2	Hungary	9	8	0	1	146	91	+55	24	Round of 16
3	Spain	9	7	0	2	151	95	+56	21	Round of 16
4	Estonia	9	5	0	4	130	109	+21	15	Round of 16
5	China	9	5	0	4	128	103	+25	15	Round of 16
6	Germany	9	4	0	5	111	133	−22	12	Round of 16
7	Brazil	9	3	0	6	101	123	−22	9	Round of 16
8	Venezuela	9	2	0	7	101	153	−52	6	Round of 16
9	Slovenia	9	2	0	7	120	156	−36	6	Eliminated
10	Syria	9	1	0	8	68	170	−102	3	Eliminated

18 August 2014
19:40

Brazil	2–15	Estonia

Wutaishan Sports Center, Nanjing

19 August 2014
17:40

Venezuela	12–10	Brazil

Wutaishan Sports Center, Nanjing

19 August 2014
21:00

Brazil	19–7	Syria

Wutaishan Sports Center, Nanjing

20 August 2014
19:40

Hungary	21–12	Brazil

Wutaishan Sports Center, Nanjing

22 August 2014
18:00

Brazil	7–16	Spain

Wutaishan Sports Center, Nanjing

22 August 2014
21:40

Germany	16–11	Brazil

Wutaishan Sports Center, Nanjing

23 August 2014
20:00

Brazil	20–9	Slovenia

Wutaishan Sports Center, Nanjing

24 August 2014
18:20

Brazil	6–21	Netherlands

Wutaishan Sports Center, Nanjing

24 August 2014
20:40

China	6–14	Brazil

Wutaishan Sports Center, Nanjing

L16-Final

25 August 2014
19:20

Brazil	16–20	Belgium

Wutaishan Sports Center, Nanjing

Knockout Stage

Round of 16	Quarterfinals	Semifinals	Final	Rank
Opposition Score	Opposition Score	Opposition Score	Opposition Score	Rank
Belgium; L 16-20	did not advance			

== Beach volleyball ==
Brazil qualified a boys' and girls' team from their performance at the 2014 CSV Youth Beach volleyball Tour.

Athletes	Event	Preliminary round	Standing	Round of 24	Round of 16	Quarterfinals	Semifinals	Final / BM	Rank
Athletes	Event	Opposition Score	Standing	Opposition Score	Opposition Score	Opposition Score	Opposition Score	Opposition Score	Rank
Arthur Lanci; George Wanderley	Boys'	Pool B Hutchinson – Bryan (JAM); W 2 – 0 (21–8, 21–12)	2 Q	Bramont – Heredia (PER); W	Kovalov – Plotnytskyi (UKR); W 2 - 0 (21-12, 21–15)	Iarzutkin – Stoyanovskiy (RUS); L 1 – 2 (21-15, 9-21, 12–15)	did not advance		9
Arthur Lanci; George Wanderley	Boys'	Rudolf – Stadie (GER); L 1 – 2 (26–24, 20–22, 12–15)	2 Q	Bramont – Heredia (PER); W	Kovalov – Plotnytskyi (UKR); W 2 - 0 (21-12, 21–15)	Iarzutkin – Stoyanovskiy (RUS); L 1 – 2 (21-15, 9-21, 12–15)	did not advance		9
Arthur Lanci; George Wanderley	Boys'	Moore – Robinson (NZL); W 2 – 0 (21–17, 21–10)	2 Q	Bramont – Heredia (PER); W	Kovalov – Plotnytskyi (UKR); W 2 - 0 (21-12, 21–15)	Iarzutkin – Stoyanovskiy (RUS); L 1 – 2 (21-15, 9-21, 12–15)	did not advance		9
Arthur Lanci; George Wanderley	Boys'	Navickas – Vaskelis (LTU); W 2 - 0	2 Q	Bramont – Heredia (PER); W	Kovalov – Plotnytskyi (UKR); W 2 - 0 (21-12, 21–15)	Iarzutkin – Stoyanovskiy (RUS); L 1 – 2 (21-15, 9-21, 12–15)	did not advance		9
Arthur Lanci; George Wanderley	Boys'	Moussa – Ossolo (CGO); W 2 - 0	2 Q	Bramont – Heredia (PER); W	Kovalov – Plotnytskyi (UKR); W 2 - 0 (21-12, 21–15)	Iarzutkin – Stoyanovskiy (RUS); L 1 – 2 (21-15, 9-21, 12–15)	did not advance		9
Ana Patrícia Ramos; Eduarda Lisboa	Girls'	Pool B Muno – Caputo (USA); W 2 – 0 (21–18, 21–11)	1 Q	Bye	Bernier – Cajigas (PUR); W 2 - 0 (21-16, 21–12)	Hiruela – Verasio (ARG); W 2 - 0 (26-24, 21–14)	Makroguzova – Rugykh (RUS); W 2 - 0 (21-18, 21–19)	McNamara – McNamara (CAN); W 2 - 1 (17-21, 21–13, 16–14)	1st place, gold medalist(s)
Ana Patrícia Ramos; Eduarda Lisboa	Girls'	Valkova – Adamcikova (CZE); W 2 – 0 (21–19, 21–8)	1 Q	Bye	Bernier – Cajigas (PUR); W 2 - 0 (21-16, 21–12)	Hiruela – Verasio (ARG); W 2 - 0 (26-24, 21–14)	Makroguzova – Rugykh (RUS); W 2 - 0 (21-18, 21–19)	McNamara – McNamara (CAN); W 2 - 1 (17-21, 21–13, 16–14)	1st place, gold medalist(s)
Ana Patrícia Ramos; Eduarda Lisboa	Girls'	Vi – Van (VIE); W 2 – 0 (21–6, 21–14)	1 Q	Bye	Bernier – Cajigas (PUR); W 2 - 0 (21-16, 21–12)	Hiruela – Verasio (ARG); W 2 - 0 (26-24, 21–14)	Makroguzova – Rugykh (RUS); W 2 - 0 (21-18, 21–19)	McNamara – McNamara (CAN); W 2 - 1 (17-21, 21–13, 16–14)	1st place, gold medalist(s)
Ana Patrícia Ramos; Eduarda Lisboa	Girls'	Conteh – Turay (SLE); W w/o	1 Q	Bye	Bernier – Cajigas (PUR); W 2 - 0 (21-16, 21–12)	Hiruela – Verasio (ARG); W 2 - 0 (26-24, 21–14)	Makroguzova – Rugykh (RUS); W 2 - 0 (21-18, 21–19)	McNamara – McNamara (CAN); W 2 - 1 (17-21, 21–13, 16–14)	1st place, gold medalist(s)
Ana Patrícia Ramos; Eduarda Lisboa	Girls'	Gerson – Rohrer (SUI)	1 Q	Bye	Bernier – Cajigas (PUR); W 2 - 0 (21-16, 21–12)	Hiruela – Verasio (ARG); W 2 - 0 (26-24, 21–14)	Makroguzova – Rugykh (RUS); W 2 - 0 (21-18, 21–19)	McNamara – McNamara (CAN); W 2 - 1 (17-21, 21–13, 16–14)	1st place, gold medalist(s)

== Canoeing ==
Brazil qualified one boat based on its performance at the 2013 World Junior Canoe sprint and slalom Championships.

Girls

Athlete	Event	Qualification		Repechage		Round of 16		Quarterfinals	Semifinals	Final / BM	Rank
Athlete	Event	Time	Rank	Time	Rank	Time	Rank	Opposition Result	Opposition Result	Opposition Result	Rank
Mirian de Sousa Barbosa	C1 slalom	DSQ		did not advance		—N/a		did not advance			
Mirian de Sousa Barbosa	C1 sprint	3:03.673	9	3:18.378	6	—N/a		did not advance			
Mirian de Sousa Barbosa	K1 slalom	DSQ		did not advance		—N/a		did not advance			
Mirian de Sousa Barbosa	K1 sprint	1:58.883	11	1:59.825	1	—N/a		Camila Morison Rey (ESP); L 1:54.433 - 1:48.223	did not advance		

== Cycling ==
Brazil qualified a boys' and girls' team based on its ranking issued by the UCI.

Team

Athletes	Event	Cross-Country Eliminator		Time trial			BMX		Cross-Country race			Road race			Total Pts	Rank
Athletes	Event	Rank	Points	Time	Rank	Points	Rank	Points	Time	Rank	Points	Time	Rank	Points	Total Pts	Rank
Rodrigo Querino; André Eduardo Gorh	Boys' Team	22	0	5:15.58	6	30	20	0	-3 LAP	25	0	1:37:23; 1:37:42	3; 37	65	95	12
Ana Paula Casetta; Renata da Silva Lopes	Girls' Team	DNS		6:15.21	14	3	22	0	-2 LAP	25	0	1:12:36; 1:12:55	1; 35	100	103	12

Mixed relay

Athletes	Event	Cross-Country Girls' race	Cross-Country Boys' race	Boys' Road race	Girls' Road race	Total Time	Rank
Ana Paula Casetta; Rodrigo Querino; André Eduardo Gorh; Renata da Silva Lopes	Mixed team relay	3:25	6:36	11:56	18:21	18:21	9

== Diving ==
Brazil qualified two quotas based on its performance at the Nanjing 2014 Diving Qualifying Event.

Athlete	Event	Preliminary		Final	
Athlete	Event	Points	Rank	Points	Rank
Ingrid de Oliveira	Girls' 3 m springboard	391.30	8	392.35	7
Ingrid de Oliveira	Girls' 10 m platform	376.20	6	399.60	5
Ingrid de Oliveira (BRA); Timo Barthel (GER)	Mixed team	—N/a		280.40	10

== Equestrian ==
Brazil qualified a rider.

Athlete	Horse	Event	Round 1		Round 2			Total	
Athlete	Horse	Event	Penalties	Rank	Penalties	Total	Rank	Penalties	Rank
Bianca de Souza Rodrigues	La Gomera	Individual jumping	Eliminated						
South America; Martina Campi (ARG); Bianca de Souza Rodrigues (BRA); Antoine Porte (CHI); Valeria Jimenez Caballero (PAR); Francisco Calvelo Martinez (URU)	Darina; La Gomera; Zyralynn; Cenai; Lord Power	Team jumping	4; ~~EL~~; ~~20~~; 0; 0	2	0; ~~20~~; ~~8~~; 0; 0	4	2	4	2nd place, silver medalist(s)

== Fencing ==
Brazil qualified two quotas based on its performance at the FIE Cadet & Junior World Championships 2014.

Boys

Athlete	Event	Pool round	Seed	Round of 16	Quarterfinals	Semifinals	Final / BM	Rank
Athlete	Event	Opposition Score	Seed	Opposition Score	Opposition Score	Opposition Score	Opposition Score	Rank
Pedro Marostega	foil	16-23	6	Seo (KOR); L 11–15	did not advance			11

Girls

Athlete	Event	Pool Round	Seed	Round of 16	Quarterfinals	Semifinals	Final / BM	Rank
Athlete	Event	Opposition Score	Seed	Opposition Score	Opposition Score	Opposition Score	Opposition Score	Rank
Gabriela Cecchini	foil	20-21	5	Lau (HKG); W 15–9	Huang (CHN); L 8–15	did not advance		8

Mixed team

Athletes	Event	Round of 16	Quarterfinals	Semifinals / PM	Final / PM	Rank
Athletes	Event	Opposition Score	Opposition Score	Opposition Score	Opposition Score	Rank
Americas 2 Dylan French (CAN); Gabriela Cecchini (BRA); Karol Metryka (USA); Tia Simms-Lymn (JAM); Pedro Marostega (BRA); Aydill-Marie Colon Quinones (PUR)	Mixed team	Africa; W 30–20	Europe 1 L 29–30	Europe 3 W 30–29	Europe 4 W 30–28	5

== Gymnastics ==
=== Artistic gymnastics ===
Brazil qualified two athletes based on its performance at the 2014 Junior Pan American Artistic gymnastics Championships.

Originally, Rebeca Andrade was Brazil's artistic gymnastics girl representative but she sustained an injury during training, forcing her to withdraw. Compatriot, Flávia Saraiva, took her place

Boys

Athlete	Event	Apparatus						Total	Rank
Athlete	Event	F	PH	R	V	PB	HB	Total	Rank
O.C. De Goncalves	Qualification	12.600 30	12.325 22	11.250 34	13.700 26	11.000 35	12.750 18	73.625	31

Girls

Athlete	Event	Vault		Uneven bars		Beam		Floor		Total	
Athlete	Event	Score	Rank	Score	Rank	Score	Rank	Score	Rank	Score	Rank
Flávia Saraiva	Girls' qualification	13.750	9	12.150	10	13.200	5 Q	13.650	1 Q	52.750	6 Q
Flávia Saraiva	Girls' individual all-around	13.900	6	12.950	4	14.050	1	13.800	1	54.700	2nd place, silver medalist(s)
Flávia Saraiva	Girls' floor exercise	—N/a								13.766	1st place, gold medalist(s)
Flávia Saraiva	Girls' balance beam	—N/a								14.000	2nd place, silver medalist(s)

=== Rhythmic gymnastics ===
Brazil qualified one athlete based on its performance at the 2014 Junior Pan American Rhythmic Championships.

Individual

Athlete	Event	Qualification						Final					
Athlete	Event	Hoop	Ball	Clubs	Ribbon	Total	Rank	Hoop	Ball	Clubs	Ribbon	Total	Rank
Mayra Siñeriz	Individual	11.550	10.150	10.550	11.050	43.300	17	did not advance					

== Handball ==
Brazil qualified a boys' team on its performance at the 2014 Handball Pan American Men's Youth Championship and a girls' team on its performance at the 2014 Pan American Women's Youth Handball Championship.

=== Boys' tournament ===
Roster

- Leonardo Abrahao Silveira
- Pedro Alves Umbelina Jr
- Gabriel Ceretta
- Marcos Colodeti
- Marcio da Silva Maildo
- Carlos de Oliveira Correa
- Gabriel dos Santos Gondim
- Leonardo Dutra
- Andre Goncalves de Lima Amorim
- Rangel Luan da Rosa
- Fernando Pereira Leite
- Henrique Petter Solenta
- Eduardo Santos da Costa Moreira
- Patrick Toniazzo Lemos

Group stage

Team	Pld	W	D	L	GF	GA	GD	Pts	Qualification
Egypt	2	2	0	0	57	50	+7	4	Semifinals
Norway	2	1	0	1	60	59	+1	2	Semifinals
Brazil	2	0	0	2	54	62	−8	0	5th place game

21 August; 18:00	Brazil	31 - 33	Norway	Jiangning Sports Centre Gymnasium, Nanjing

22 August; 18:00	Egypt	29 - 23	Brazil	Jiangning Sports Centre Gymnasium, Nanjing

Placement match 5-6

24 August; 11:00	Brazil	38 - 31	Tunisia	Jiangning Sports Centre Gymnasium, Nanjing
24 August; 11:00		(23 - 15)		Jiangning Sports Centre Gymnasium, Nanjing

25 August; 11:00	Tunisia	27 - 28	Brazil	Jiangning Sports Centre Gymnasium, Nanjing
25 August; 11:00		(12 - 13)		Jiangning Sports Centre Gymnasium, Nanjing

=== Girls' tournament ===
Roster

- Ana Luiza Aguiar Camelo Borba
- Bruna de Paula
- Talita Alves Carneiro
- Ana Claudia Bolzan E Silva
- Juliana Borges Lima
- Lígia Costa
- Maite de Lima Dias
- Jessica de Souza Suzano Costa
- Cecilia Do Nascimento Mouzinho
- Flavia Lima Gabina
- Aline Mayumi Koeke Bednarski
- Mariane Oliveira Fernandes
- Anna Rodrigues Arruda
- Barbara Sanny Vasconcelos Ferreir

Group stage

Pos	Team	Pld	W	D	L	GF	GA	GD	Pts	Qualification
1	Sweden	2	2	0	0	71	38	+33	4	Semifinals
2	Brazil	2	1	0	1	56	50	+6	2	Semifinals
3	China (H)	2	0	0	2	32	71	−39	0	5th place game

Source: Nanjing 2014
Rules for classification: 1) points; 2) head-to-head points; 3) head-to-head goal difference; 4) head-to-head number of goals scored; 5) goal difference.
(H) Hosts

21 August; 16:00	Brazil	32 - 18	China	Jiangning Sports Centre Gymnasium, Nanjing; Referees: Brunner, Salah (Switzerland)
21 August; 16:00	Oliveira Fernandes, Maia da Silva 5	(14 - 6)	Liu 6	Jiangning Sports Centre Gymnasium, Nanjing; Referees: Brunner, Salah (Switzerland)
21 August; 16:00	3× (yellow card) 1× (suspension)	Report	3× (yellow card) 3× (suspension)	Jiangning Sports Centre Gymnasium, Nanjing; Referees: Brunner, Salah (Switzerland)

22 August; 16:00	Sweden	32 - 24	Brazil	Jiangning Sports Centre Gymnasium, Nanjing; Referees: Shimajiri, Ota (Japan)
22 August; 16:00	Mellegard 7	(16 - 11)	Almeida de Paula, Alves Carneiro 6	Jiangning Sports Centre Gymnasium, Nanjing; Referees: Shimajiri, Ota (Japan)
22 August; 16:00	2× (yellow card) 2× (suspension)	Report	3× (yellow card) 4× (suspension) 1× (red card)	Jiangning Sports Centre Gymnasium, Nanjing; Referees: Shimajiri, Ota (Japan)

Semifinals

24 August; 15:30	Russia	30 - 22	Brazil	Jiangning Sports Center Gymnasium; Referees: Liu, Li (China)
24 August; 15:30	Golikova, Vernigorova 5	(17 - 7)	Almeida de Paula 6	Jiangning Sports Center Gymnasium; Referees: Liu, Li (China)
24 August; 15:30	4× (yellow card) 3× (suspension)	Report	3× (yellow card) 1× (suspension)	Jiangning Sports Center Gymnasium; Referees: Liu, Li (China)

Bronze medal game

25 August; 13:00	Sweden	23 - 16	Brazil 4th	Jiangning Sports Center Gymnasium; Referees: Shimairi, Ota (Japan)
25 August; 13:00	four players 4	(11 - 5)	Rodrigues Arruda	Jiangning Sports Center Gymnasium; Referees: Shimairi, Ota (Japan)
25 August; 13:00	3× (yellow card) 2× (suspension)	Report	3× (yellow card) 3× (suspension)	Jiangning Sports Center Gymnasium; Referees: Shimairi, Ota (Japan)

== Judo ==
Brazil qualified two athletes based on its performance at the 2013 Cadet World Judo Championships.

Individual

Athlete	Event	Round of 32	Round of 16	Quarterfinals	Semifinals	Rep 1	Rep 2	Rep 3	Rep 4	Final / BM	Rank
Athlete	Event	Opposition Result	Opposition Result	Opposition Result	Opposition Result	Opposition Result	Opposition Result	Opposition Result	Opposition Result	Opposition Result	Rank
José Basile	Boys' -81 kg	Grinda (MON); W 110–010	Igolnikov (RUS); L 000S1–102	did not advance		Farukhi (TJK); L 010–100	did not advance				21
Layana Colman	Girls' -52 kg	—N/a	Lorenzana (GUA); W 001S1–000S2	Einstein (SWE); W 010–000S2	Janashvili (GEO); W 000–000S2	BYE			—N/a	Temelkova (BUL); W 100–000	1st place, gold medalist(s)

Team

Athletes	Event	Round of 16	Quarterfinals	Semifinals	Final	Rank
Athletes	Event	Opposition Result	Opposition Result	Opposition Result	Opposition Result	Rank
Team Ruska; Sadjia Amrane (ALG); Jose Basile (BRA); Harutyun Dermishyan (ARM); Szabina Gercsák (HUN); Lovro Kovac (CRO); Kamila Pasternak (POL); Julian Sancho (CRC); Betina Temelkova (BUL)	Mixed team	Bye	Team Rouge (MIX); L 2 – 5	did not advance		5
Team Geesink; Layana Colman (BRA); Nemanja Majdov (SRB); Dzmitry Minkou (BLR); Ryu Seunghwan (KOR); Ivana Sunjevic (MNE); Anastasya Turcheva (RUS); Yu-Jyun Wang (TPE)	Mixed team	Team Chochishvili (MIX); W 4 – 3	Team Van De Walle (MIX); W 4 – 3	Team Douillet (MIX); W 3^{202} – 3^{111}	Team Rouge (MIX); L 2 – 4	2nd place, silver medalist(s)

== Rowing ==
Brazil qualified two boats based on its performance at the 2013 World Rowing Junior Championships and the Continental Qualifier.

Athlete	Event	Heats		Repechage		Semifinals		Final	
Athlete	Event	Time	Rank	Time	Rank	Time	Rank	Time	Rank
Uncas Tales	Boys' Single Sculls	3:26.25	2 R	3:22.24	1SA/B	3:24.42	4FB	3:27.44	7
Sophia Câmara Py	Girls' Single Sculls	4:00.60	5 R	4:00.80	5 SC/D	3:59.45	3 FC	4:08.27	17

Qualification Legend: FA=Final A (medal); FB=Final B (non-medal); FC=Final C (non-medal); FD=Final D (non-medal); SA/B=Semifinals A/B; SC/D=Semifinals C/D; R=Repechage

== Sailing ==
Brazil qualified two boats based on its performance at the Byte CII Central & South American Continental Qualifiers. Brazil later qualified one more boat based on its performance at the Techno 293 Central & South American Continental Qualifiers.

Athlete	Event	Race											Net Points	Final Rank
Athlete	Event	1	2	3	4	5	6	7	8	9	10	M*	Net Points	Final Rank
Pedro Marcondes Correa	Boys' Byte CII	1	4	2	3	(20)	18	9	14	Cancelled		71.00	51.00	6
Daniel Pereira	Boys' Techno 293	2	(14)	11	12	14	13	11	Cancelled			77.00	63.00	12
Natascha dos Santos Böddener	Girls' Byte CII	18	10	5	3	24	(27)	10	29	Cancelled		126.00	99.00	17

== Swimming ==
Brazil qualified eight swimmers.

Boys

Athlete	Event	Heat		Semifinal		Final	
Athlete	Event	Time	Rank	Time	Rank	Time	Rank
Matheus Santana	50 m freestyle	22.55	1Q	22.48	2Q	22.43	2nd place, silver medalist(s)
Matheus Santana	100 m freestyle	50.15Q	1=	49.30Q	1Q	48.25	1st place, gold medalist(s)
Luiz Altamir Melo	200 m freestyle	1:50.58	3Q	—N/a		1:50.51	7
Luiz Altamir Melo	400 m freestyle	3:53.79	7Q	—N/a		3:55.07	7
Luiz Altamir Melo	200 m butterfly	1:59.41	3Q	—N/a		1:58.34	5
Vitor Nascimento Guaraldo Santo	50 m backstroke	26.13	6Q	25.79	4Q	25.85	6
Vitor Nascimento Guaraldo Santo	100 m backstroke	56.73	13Q	56.27	12	did not advance	
Vitor Nascimento Guaraldo Santo	200 m backstroke	2:08.89	26	—N/a		did not advance	
Andreas de Queiroz Mickosz	50 m breaststroke	29.17	19	did not advance			
Andreas de Queiroz Mickosz	100 m breaststroke	1:02.74	6Q	1:02.89	8Q	1:02.82	8
Andreas de Queiroz Mickosz	200 m breaststroke	2:16.62	7Q	—N/a		2:17.17	8
Luiz Altamir Melo; Andreas de Queiroz Mickosz; Matheus Santana; Vitor Nascimento Guaraldo Santo	4 × 100 m freestyle relay	DNS		—N/a			

Girls

Athlete	Event	Heat		Semifinal		Final	
Athlete	Event	Time	Rank	Time	Rank	Time	Rank
Giovanna Diamante	200 m freestyle	2:03.75	20	—N/a		did not advance	
Giovanna Diamante	50 m butterfly	27.53	11 Q	27.05	7 Q	27.40	8
Giovanna Diamante	100 m butterfly	1:01.03	14 Q	1:00.77	10	did not advance	
Giovanna Diamante	200 m butterfly	2:16.34	15	—N/a		did not advance	
Viviane Jungblut	400 m freestyle	4:16.14	9	—N/a		did not advance	
Viviane Jungblut	800 m freestyle	—N/a				8:50.49	11
Bruna Primati	400 m freestyle	4:14.38	3 Q	—N/a		4:15.12	7
Bruna Primati	800 m freestyle	—N/a				8:42.80	6
Bruna Primati	200 m individual medley	2:20.41	16	—N/a		did not advance	
Natalia de Luccas	50 m backstroke	29.51	9 Q	29.40	10	did not advance	
Natalia de Luccas	100 m backstroke	1:02.05	2 Q	1:02.06	4 Q	1:01.39	4
Natalia de Luccas	200 m backstroke	2:17.83	16	—N/a		did not advance	
Natalia de Luccas; Viviane Jungblut; Giovanna Diamante; Bruna Primati	4 × 100 m freestyle relay	3:51.40	5 Q	—N/a		3:46.34	5

Mixed

Athlete	Event	Heat		Final	
Athlete	Event	Time	Rank	Time	Rank
Andreas de Queiroz Mickosz; Natalia de Luccas; Matheus Santana; Giovanna Diamante	4 × 100 m medley relay	3:59.51	7Q	3:53.93	4
Luiz Altamir Melo; Natalia de Luccas; Matheus Santana; Giovanna Diamante	4 × 100 m freestyle relay	3:33.14	2	3:31.55	Silver

== Table tennis ==
At the moment Brazil has one athlete qualified.

singles

Athlete	Event	Group stage	Rank	Round of 16	Quarterfinals	Semifinals	Final / BM	Rank
Athlete	Event	Opposition Score	Rank	Opposition Score	Opposition Score	Opposition Score	Opposition Score	Rank
Hugo Calderano	Boys	Group C Fermin Tenti (ARG); W 3–1	1 Q	Padasak Tanviriyavechakul (THA); W 4–3	Patryk Zatowka (POL); W 4–3	Yuto Muramatsu (JPN); L 1–4	Heng-Wei Yang (TPE); W 4–2	Bronze
Hugo Calderano	Boys	Elias Ranefur (SWE); W 3–1	1 Q	Padasak Tanviriyavechakul (THA); W 4–3	Patryk Zatowka (POL); W 4–3	Yuto Muramatsu (JPN); L 1–4	Heng-Wei Yang (TPE); W 4–2	Bronze
Hugo Calderano	Boys	Dominic Huang (AUS); W 3–0	1 Q	Padasak Tanviriyavechakul (THA); W 4–3	Patryk Zatowka (POL); W 4–3	Yuto Muramatsu (JPN); L 1–4	Heng-Wei Yang (TPE); W 4–2	Bronze

Team

Athletes	Event	Group stage	Rank	Round of 16	Quarterfinals	Semifinals	Final / BM	Rank
Athletes	Event	Opposition Score	Rank	Opposition Score	Opposition Score	Opposition Score	Opposition Score	Rank
Latin America 1 Maria Lorenzotti (URU); Hugo Calderano (BRA)	Mixed	Europe 3 Giorgia Piccolin (ITA); Elia Schmid (SUI); W 2–1	1 Q	Europe 2 Elias Ranefur (SWE); Nicole Trosman (ISR); L 1–2	did not advance			16
Latin America 1 Maria Lorenzotti (URU); Hugo Calderano (BRA)	Mixed	Germany; Kilian Ort (GER); Yuan Wan (GER); W 3–0	1 Q	Europe 2 Elias Ranefur (SWE); Nicole Trosman (ISR); L 1–2	did not advance			16
Latin America 1 Maria Lorenzotti (URU); Hugo Calderano (BRA)	Mixed	Africa 1 Kerem Ben Yahia (TUN); Sannah Lagsir (ALG); W 3–0	1 Q	Europe 2 Elias Ranefur (SWE); Nicole Trosman (ISR); L 1–2	did not advance			16

Qualification Legend: Q=Main Bracket (medal); qB=Consolation Bracket (non-medal)

== Taekwondo ==
Brazil has two athletes qualified based on its performance at the Taekwondo Qualification Tournament.

Boys

Athlete	Event	Round of 16	Quarterfinals	Semifinals	Final	Rank
Athlete	Event	Opposition Result	Opposition Result	Opposition Result	Opposition Result	Rank
Edival Pontes	−63 kg	BYE	Frankford (AUT); W 16(PTG)–4	McNeish (GBR); W 12–6	Nava Rodriguez (MEX); W 7–6	Gold

Girls

Athlete	Event	Round of 16	Quarterfinals	Semifinals	Final	Rank
Athlete	Event	Opposition Result	Opposition Result	Opposition Result	Opposition Result	Rank
Milena Guimarães	+63 kg	BYE	Yount (USA); L 1–2	did not advance		

== Tennis ==
Brazil qualified three athletes based on the 9 June 2014 ITF World Junior Rankings.

singles

Athlete	Event	Round of 32	Round of 16	Quarterfinals	Semifinals	Final / BM	Rank
Athlete	Event	Opposition Score	Opposition Score	Opposition Score	Opposition Score	Opposition Score	Rank
Orlando Luz	Boys' singles	Chrysochos (CYP); W 2–1 (4–6, 7–6, 6–1)	Rosas (PER); W 2–0 (6–2, 6–4)	Geens (BEL); W 2–0 (6–2, 6–4)	Yamasaki (JPN); W 2–1 (6–2, 4–6, 6–2)	Majchrzak (POL); L 0–2 (5–7, 4–6)	Silver
Marcelo Zormann	Boys' singles	Matsumura (JPN); L 0–2 (3–6, 4–6)	did not advance				
Luisa Stefani	Girls' singles	Kim (KOR); L 0–2 (5–7, 2–6)	did not advance				

doubles

Athletes	Event	Round of 32	Round of 16	Quarterfinals	Semifinals	Final / BM	Rank
Athletes	Event	Opposition Score	Opposition Score	Opposition Score	Opposition Score	Opposition Score	Rank
Orlando Luz (BRA); Marcelo Zormann (BRA)	Boys' doubles	—N/a	Bourchier (AUS); Polmans (AUS); W 2–1 (6–4, 1–6, 10–7)	Álvarez (PER); Rosas (PER); W 2–0 (6–4, 7–6)	Matsumura (JPN); Yamasaki (JPN); W 2–0 (6–1, 7–2)	Khachanov (RUS); Rublev (RUS); W 2–1 (7–5, 3–6, 10–3)	Gold
Luisa Stefani (BRA); Maria Fernanda Herazo (COL)	Girls' doubles	—N/a	Kalinina (UKR); Shymanovich (BLR); L 0–2 (3–6, 6–7^{(3-7)})	did not advance			
Luisa Stefani (BRA); Orlando Luz (BRA)	Mixed doubles	Buayan (THA); Chung (KOR); W 2–0 (6–2, 6–2)	Kenin (USA); Rybakov (USA); W 2–0 (6–4, 6–4)	Yamasaki (JPN); Ye (CHN); L 1-2 (1-6, 6–3, 6-10)	did not advance		
Camila Giangreco Campiz (PAR); Marcelo Zormann (BRA)	Mixed doubles	Vondrusova (CZE); Álvarez (PER); W 2–0 (7–5, 7–5)	Samir (EGY); Harris (RSA); W 2–1 (7–5, 3-6, 10-5)	Majchrzak (POL); Stollar (HUN); L 0-2 (5-7, 2-6)	did not advance		

== Triathlon ==
Brazil qualified one athlete based on its performance at the 2014 American Youth Olympic Games Qualifier.

Individual

Athlete	Event	Swim (750m)	Trans 1	Bike (20 km)	Trans 2	Run (5 km)	Total Time	Rank
Barbara Santos	Girls	10:53 (24); 10:53	11:48 (30); 0:55	44:39 (15); 32:51	45:09 (28); 0:30	1:05:19 (20); 20:10	1:05:19 (+5:23)	20

Relay

Athlete	Event	Total times per athlete (swim 250m, bike 6.6 km, run 1.8 km)	Total group time	Rank
America 3 Barbara Santos (BRA); Tyler Smith (BER); Giovanna Gonzalez Miranda (ESA); Jose Solorzano (VEN)	Mixed relay	22:51; 21:04; 24:11; 22:11	1:30:17	11

== Weightlifting ==
Brazil qualified 1 quota in the girls' events based on the team ranking after the 2014 Weightlifting Youth Pan American Championships.

Girls

Athlete	Event	Snatch		Clean & jerk		Total	Rank
Athlete	Event	Result	Rank	Result	Rank	Total	Rank
Emily Rosa Figueiredo	−48 kg	62	7	78	8	140	7

== Wrestling ==
Brazil qualified two athletes based on its performance at the 2014 Pan American Cadet Championships.

Key:
- VT - Victory by Fall.
- PP - Decision by Points - the loser with technical points.
- PO - Decision by Points - the loser without technical points.

Boys

Athlete	Event	Group stage				Final / RM	Rank
Athlete	Event	Opposition Score	Opposition Score	Opposition Score	Rank	Opposition Score	Rank
Rafael Filho	Freestyle -100kg	Igbal Hajizada (AZE); L 0–4 ^{ST}	Abdalla Elgizawee (EGY); L 1–4 ^{ST}	Edurado Betanzos (MEX); W 3–0 ^{PO}	3 Q	Muhammet Rozykulyyev (TKM); L 1–4 ^{ST}	6
Calebe Correia	Greco-Roman -50kg	Kaiser Muller (MHL); W 4–0	Ilkhom Bakhromov (UZB); L 0–4	Houssam Bounasri (ALG); L 0–4	3 Q	Ugur Beytekin (TUR); L 0–4 ^{ST}	6

== See also ==
- Brazil at the 2010 Summer Youth Olympics
