= Guatemala at the 2014 Summer Youth Olympics =

- IOC code: GUA
- NOC: Comité Olímpico Guatemalteco

in Nanjing
- Competitors: 20 in 10 sports
- Medals: Gold 0 Silver 0 Bronze 0 Total 0

Summer Youth Olympics appearances
- 2010; 2014; 2018; 2026

Guatemala competed at the 2014 Summer Youth Olympics, in Nanjing, China from 16 August to 28 August 2014.

== Medalists ==
Medals awarded to participants of mixed-NOC (Combined) teams are represented in italics. These medals are not counted towards the individual NOC medal tally.

Medal	Name	Sport	Event	Date
Bronze	Stefanie Brand	Equestrian	Team Jumping	20 August
Bronze	Wilmar Madrid	Shooting	Mixed Team 10m Air Pistol	21 August

== Archery ==
Guatemala qualified a female archer from its performance at the American Continental Qualification Tournament.

Individual

Athlete	Event	Ranking round		Round of 32	Round of 16	Quarterfinals	Semifinals	Final / BM	Rank
Athlete	Event	Score	Seed	Opposition Score	Opposition Score	Opposition Score	Opposition Score	Opposition Score	Rank
Regina Romero	Girls' Individual	625	19	Pitman (GBR); W 6–4	Li (CHN); L 0–6	did not advance			9

Team

Athletes	Event	Ranking round		Round of 32	Round of 16	Quarterfinals	Semifinals	Final / BM	Rank
Athletes	Event	Score	Seed	Opposition Score	Opposition Score	Opposition Score	Opposition Score	Opposition Score	Rank
Regina Romero (GUA); Rick Martens (BEL)	Mixed Team	1291	3	Lee (KOR); Elsehely (EGY); W 6-2	Pitman (GBR); Dubrova (BLR); W 5-1	Kazanskaya (BLR); Han (TPE); W 6-2	Freywald (GER); Zolkepeli (MAS); L 2-6	Tuokkola (FIN); Peters (CAN); L 2-6	4

== Basketball ==
Guatemala qualified a boys' team based on the 1 June 2014 FIBA 3x3 National Federation Rankings.

Skills Competition

Athlete	Event	Qualification				Final			
Athlete	Event	Round 1	Round 2	Total	Rank	Round 1	Round 2	Total	Rank
Juan Rosales	Boys' Dunk Contest	0	16	16	18	did not advance			

=== Boys' tournament ===
Roster

- Anthony Guerra
- Juan Rosales
- Jose Tuchan
- Jeferson Urrutia

Group Stage

Pos	Team	Pld	W	L	PF	PA	PD	Pts	Qualification
1	Argentina	9	7	2	156	101	+55	16	Round of 16
2	Russia	9	7	2	153	117	+36	16	Round of 16
3	Spain	9	7	2	145	135	+10	16	Round of 16
4	New Zealand	9	6	3	145	129	+16	15	Round of 16
5	Venezuela	9	5	4	136	128	+8	14	Round of 16
6	Brazil	9	4	5	116	92	+24	13 (Note: BRA +5, ROU −5)	Round of 16
7	Romania	9	4	5	130	122	+8	13	Round of 16
8	Tunisia	9	3	6	115	130	−15	12	Round of 16
9	Andorra	9	2	7	129	168	−39	11	Eliminated
10	Guatemala	9	0	9	74	177	−103	9	Eliminated

Notes:

18 August 2014
18:20

New Zealand	18–13	Guatemala

Wutaishan Sports Center, Nanjing

18 August 2014
21:20

Russia	20–8	Guatemala

Wutaishan Sports Center, Nanjing

19 August 2014
20:00

Guatemala	12–17	Venezuela

Wutaishan Sports Center, Nanjing

20 August 2014
17:20

Argentina	21–5	Guatemala

Wutaishan Sports Center, Nanjing

20 August 2014
20:20

Guatemala	2–19	Tunisia

Wutaishan Sports Center, Nanjing

22 August 2014
18:40

Andorra	21–10	Guatemala

Wutaishan Sports Center, Nanjing

23 August 2014
17:40

Guatemala	14–21	Spain

Wutaishan Sports Center, Nanjing

23 August 2014
20:20

Brazil	19–4	Guatemala

Wutaishan Sports Center, Nanjing

24 August 2014
19:00

Guatemala	6–21	Romania

Wutaishan Sports Center, Nanjing

== Beach Volleyball ==
Guatemala qualified a boys' and girls' team by winning the NORCECA AFECAVOL Zone Qualifier.

Athletes	Event	Preliminary round	Standing	Round of 24	Round of 16	Quarterfinals	Semifinals	Final / BM	Rank
Athletes	Event	Opposition Score	Standing	Opposition Score	Opposition Score	Opposition Score	Opposition Score	Opposition Score	Rank
Mark Alvarez; Erik Flores	Boys'	Berntsen (NOR)/ Anders Mol (NOR)	5	did not advance					
Mark Alvarez; Erik Flores	Boys'	Bogarin (PAR)/ Frutos (PAR); L 0–2	5	did not advance					
Mark Alvarez; Erik Flores	Boys'	Madushan (SRI)/ Sandaruwan (SRI); W 2–1	5	did not advance					
Mark Alvarez; Erik Flores	Boys'	Iarzutkin (RUS)/ Stoyanovskiy (RUS); L 0–2	5	did not advance					
Mark Alvarez; Erik Flores	Boys'	Ndayishimye (BDI)/ Niyongabo (BDI); W 2–0	5	did not advance					
Estefanie Bethancourt; Natalia Giron	Girls'	Placette (FRA)/ Richard (FRA)	5	did not advance					
Estefanie Bethancourt; Natalia Giron	Girls'	Gesslbauer (AUT)/ Radl (AUT)	5	did not advance					
Estefanie Bethancourt; Natalia Giron	Girls'	Kawfong (THA)/ Tangkaeo (THA); L 0–2	5	did not advance					
Estefanie Bethancourt; Natalia Giron	Girls'	Bobadilla (PAR)/ Valiente (PAR); L 0–2	5	did not advance					
Estefanie Bethancourt; Natalia Giron	Girls'	Douduwa (GHA)/ Essumang (GHA); W 2–0	5	did not advance					

== Cycling ==
Guatemala qualified a boys' and girls' team based on its ranking issued by the UCI.

Team

Athletes	Event	Cross-Country Eliminator		Time Trial			BMX		Cross-Country Race			Road Race			Total Pts	Rank
Athletes	Event	Rank	Points	Time	Rank	Points	Rank	Points	Time	Rank	Points	Time	Rank	Points	Total Pts	Rank
Andre Bos; Luis Godoy	Boys' Team	3:23.955	0	5:31.97	23	0	26	0	-1 LAP		0	1:37:29; 1:37:35	23; 32	0	0	28
Mary Burge; Joanne Rodriguez	Girls' Team	3:28.640	0	8:12.33	30	0	DNS	0	-1 LAP		0	1:28:19; 1:19:56	53; 41	0	0	30

Mixed Relay

Athletes	Event	Cross-Country Girls' Race	Cross-Country Boys' Race	Boys' Road Race	Girls' Road Race	Total Time	Rank
Mary Burge; Andre Bos; Luis Godoy; Joanne Rodriguez	Mixed Team Relay						22

== Equestrian ==
Guatemala qualified a rider.

Athlete	Horse	Event	Round 1		Round 2			Total	
Athlete	Horse	Event	Penalties	Rank	Penalties	Total	Rank	Penalties	Rank
Stefanie Brand	Chica	Individual Jumping	12	22	4			16	15
North America; Polly Serpell (CAY); María Brugal (DOM); Macarena Chiriboga Granja (ECU); Sabrina Rivera Meza (ESA); Stefanie Brand (GUA)	Giorgio Zan; Famoso; Brigand; Con-Zero; Chica	Team Jumping	4; 4; ~~8~~; ~~8~~; 0	3	0; ~~8~~; 0; 0; ~~4~~	8	3	8	3rd place, bronze medalist(s)

== Gymnastics ==
=== Artistic Gymnastics ===
Guatemala qualified one athlete based on its performance at the 2014 Junior Pan American Artistic Gymnastics Championships.

Girls

Athlete	Event	Apparatus				Total	Rank
Athlete	Event	V	UB	BB	F	Total	Rank
Katherine Godinez Reyes	Qualification	12.500 34	8.950 32	12.150 20	11.300 18	44.900	32

== Judo ==
Guatemala qualified one athlete based on its performance at the 2013 Cadet World Judo Championships.

Individual

Athlete	Event	Round of 16	Quarterfinals	Semifinals	Rep 1	Rep 2	Rep 3	Final / BM	Rank
Athlete	Event	Opposition Result	Opposition Result	Opposition Result	Opposition Result	Opposition Result	Opposition Result	Opposition Result	Rank
Karla Lorenzana	Girls' -52 kg	Colman (BRA); L 000-001	did not advance		Bye	Tseregbaatar (MGL); L 000-000	did not advance		11

Team

Athletes	Event	Round of 16	Quarterfinals	Semifinals	Final	Rank
Athletes	Event	Opposition Result	Opposition Result	Opposition Result	Opposition Result	Rank
Team Kerr; Sophie Berger (BEL); Karla Lorenzana (GUA); Saliou Ndiaye (SEN); Jennifer Schwille (GER); Oussama Snoussi (TUN); Pawel Wawrzyczek (POL); Bauyrzhan Zhauyntayev (KAZ)	Mixed Team	Team Berghmans (MIX); L 2 – 4	did not advance			9

== Modern Pentathlon ==
Guatemala qualified one athlete based on its performance at the PANAM YOG Qualifiers and another based on the 1 June 2014 Olympic Youth A Pentathlon World Rankings.

Athlete	Event	Fencing Ranking Round (épée one touch)		Swimming (200 m freestyle)			Fencing Final Round (épée one touch)			Combined: Shooting/Running (10 m air pistol)/(3000 m)			Total Points	Final Rank
Athlete	Event	Results	Rank	Time	Rank	Points	Results	Rank	Points	Time	Rank	Points	Total Points	Final Rank
Wilhelm Hengstenberg	Boys' Individual	6-17	24	2:23.67	24	269	0	24	185	12:39.11	11	541	995	24
Isabel Brand	Girls' Individual	11-12	13	2:20.53	10	279	1	13	245	13:59.33	10	461	985	11
Xiuting Zhong (CHN); Wilhelm Hengstenberg (GUA)	Mixed Relay													
Isabel Brand (GUA); Joan GISPERT TORRAS (ESP)	Mixed Relay													

== Shooting ==
Guatemala qualified one shooter based on its performance at the Americas Qualification Event held during a Shooting World Cup event in Fort Benning.

Individual

Athlete	Event	Qualification		Final	
Athlete	Event	Points	Rank	Points	Rank
Wilmar Madrid	Boys' 10m Air Pistol	560	11	did not advance	

Team

Athletes	Event	Qualification		Round of 16	Quarterfinals	Semifinals	Final / BM	Rank
Athletes	Event	Points	Rank	Opposition Result	Opposition Result	Opposition Result	Opposition Result	Rank
Wilmar Madrid (GUA); Agate Rasmane (LAT)	Mixed Team 10m Air Pistol	753	4 Q	Shermatov (TJK) / Nowak (POL); W 10-7	Akhundov (AZE) / El-hodhod (EGY); W 10-6	Mohamed (EGY) / Teh (SIN); L 9-10	Igitiyan (ARM) / Chung (TPE); W 10-8	3rd place, bronze medalist(s)

== Swimming ==
Guatemala qualified one swimmer.

Girls

Athlete	Event	Heat		Final	
Athlete	Event	Time	Rank	Time	Rank
Valerie Gruest	400 m freestyle	4:24.02	20	did not advance	
Valerie Gruest	800 m freestyle	—N/a		8:58.78	14
Valerie Gruest	200 m butterfly	—N/a			
