= Norway at the 2014 Summer Youth Olympics =

- IOC code: NOR
- NOC: Norwegian Olympic Committee
- Website: www.idrett.no

in Nanjing
- Competitors: 31 in 11 sports
- Medals Ranked 45th: Gold 1 Silver 0 Bronze 3 Total 4

Summer Youth Olympics appearances
- 2010; 2014; 2018; 2026

Norway competed at the 2014 Summer Youth Olympics, in Nanjing, China from 16 August to 28 August 2014.

== Beach volleyball ==
Norway qualified a team by being the highest ranked nation not yet qualified.

Athletes	Event	Preliminary round	Standing	Round of 24	Round of 16	Quarterfinals	Semifinals	Final / BM	Rank
Athletes	Event	Opposition Score	Standing	Opposition Score	Opposition Score	Opposition Score	Opposition Score	Opposition Score	Rank
Mathias Berntsen; Anders Mol	Boys'	Flores (GUA)/ Alvarez (GUA)	2 Q	Bye	Figueroa (PUR)/ Rivera (PUR); L 0-2	Did not advance			17
Mathias Berntsen; Anders Mol	Boys'	Iarzutkin (RUS)/ Stoyanovskiy (RUS); L 0–2	2 Q	Bye	Figueroa (PUR)/ Rivera (PUR); L 0-2	Did not advance			17
Mathias Berntsen; Anders Mol	Boys'	Ndayishimye (BDI)/ Niyongabo (BDI); W 2–0	2 Q	Bye	Figueroa (PUR)/ Rivera (PUR); L 0-2	Did not advance			17
Mathias Berntsen; Anders Mol	Boys'	Madushan (SRI)/ Sandaruwan (SRI); W 2–0	2 Q	Bye	Figueroa (PUR)/ Rivera (PUR); L 0-2	Did not advance			17
Mathias Berntsen; Anders Mol	Boys'	Bogarin (PAR)/ Frutos (PAR); W 2–0	2 Q	Bye	Figueroa (PUR)/ Rivera (PUR); L 0-2	Did not advance			17

== Boxing ==
Norway qualified one boxer based on its performance at the 2014 AIBA Youth World Championships

Boys

Athlete	Event	Preliminaries	Semifinals	Final / RM	Rank
Athlete	Event	Opposition Result	Opposition Result	Opposition Result	Rank
Vegar Tregren	-81 kg	Kazakov (KAZ); L 0-3	Did not advance	Bout for 5th place Tekneci (TUR); L 1-2	6

== Canoeing ==
Norway qualified one boat based on its performance at the 2013 World Junior Canoe Sprint and Slalom Championships.

Girls

Athlete	Event	Qualification		Repechage		Round of 16		Quarterfinals	Semifinals	Final / BM	Rank
Athlete	Event	Time	Rank	Time	Rank	Time	Rank	Opposition Result	Opposition Result	Opposition Result	Rank
Camilla Rozanski	K1 slalom	1:32.838	12 R	1:33.631	4 Q	1:32.630	12	Did not advance			12
Camilla Rozanski	K1 sprint	1:55.746	8 Q	—N/a		1:57.105	9	Did not advance			9

== Diving ==
Norway qualified two quotas based on its performance at the Nanjing 2014 Diving Qualifying Event.

Athlete	Event	Preliminary		Final	
Athlete	Event	Points	Rank	Points	Rank
Daniel Jensen	Boys' 3 m springboard	508.15	7	532.40	7
Daniel Jensen	Boys' 10 m platform	406.30	9	470.65	6
Alejandra Orozco Loza (MEX); Daniel Jensen (NOR)	Mixed team	—N/a		379.50	1st place, gold medalist(s)

== Golf ==
Norway qualified one team of two athletes based on the 8 June 2014 IGF Combined World Amateur Golf Rankings.

Individual

Athlete	Event	Round 1		Round 2			Round 3			Total	
Athlete	Event	Score	Rank	Score	Total	Rank	Score	Total	Rank	Score	Rank
Viktor Hovland	Boys	68	4	68	136	1	74	210	4	210 (+2)	4
Sandra Nordaas	Girls	73	11	77	150	22	79	229	22	229 (+13)	=22

Team

Athletes	Event	Round 1 (Foursome)		Round 2 (Fourball)			Round 3 (Individual Stroke)				Total	
Athletes	Event	Score	Rank	Score	Total	Rank	Boy	Girl	Total	Rank	Score	Rank
Viktor Hovland; Sandra Nordaas	Mixed	64 (-8)	5	71 (-1)	135 (-9)	7	77 (+5)	78 (+6)	290 (+2)	17	290	=17

== Gymnastics ==
=== Artistic Gymnastics ===
Norway qualified one athlete based on its performance at the 2014 European WAG Championships.

Girls

Athlete	Event	Apparatus				Total	Rank
Athlete	Event	F	V	UB	BB	Total	Rank
Martine Skregelid	Qualification	11.850 23	12.850 29	10.550 23	12.750 10	48.000	20

== Handball ==
Norway qualified a boys' team based on its performance at the 2013 European Youth Summer Olympic Festival.

=== Boys' tournament ===
Roster

- Sindre Aho
- Kevin Gulliksen
- Tobias Hansen
- Tormod Hauane
- Aksel Horgen
- Jorgen Jansruid
- Eirik Kopp
- Sivert Nordeng
- Jonas Olsen
- Sandr Overjordet
- Magnus Rod
- Kristian Saeveras
- Simen Schonningsen
- Lasse Thorsbye

Group stage

Team	Pld	W	D	L	GF	GA	GD	Pts	Qualification
Egypt	2	2	0	0	57	50	+7	4	Semifinals
Norway	2	1	0	1	60	59	+1	2	Semifinals
Brazil	2	0	0	2	54	62	−8	0	5th place game

20 August; 18:00	Norway	27 - 28	Egypt	Jiangning Sports Centre Gymnasium, Nanjing
20 August; 18:00		(11 - 14)		Jiangning Sports Centre Gymnasium, Nanjing

21 August; 18:00	Brazil	31 - 33	Norway	Jiangning Sports Centre Gymnasium, Nanjing

Semifinals

24 August; 20:00	Norway	30 - 33	Slovenia	Jiangning Sports Center Gymnasium
24 August; 20:00		(14 - 13)		Jiangning Sports Center Gymnasium

Bronze-medal match

25 August; 15:30	Qatar	25 - 33	Norway (bronze)	Jiangning Sports Center Gymnasium
25 August; 15:30		(13 - 19)		Jiangning Sports Center Gymnasium

== Rowing ==
Norway qualified two boats based on its performance at the 2013 World Rowing Junior Championships.

Athlete	Event	Heats		Repechage		Semifinals		Final	
Athlete	Event	Time	Rank	Time	Rank	Time	Rank	Time	Rank
Ask Tjom	Boys' Single Sculls	3:31.71	4 R	3:31.63	4 SC/D	3:33.74	3 FC	3:36.96	17
Thea Helseth	Girls' Single Sculls	3:48.79	1 SA/B	—N/a		3:51.22	5 FB	3:59.28	7

Qualification Legend: FA=Final A (medal); FB=Final B (non-medal); FC=Final C (non-medal); FD=Final D (non-medal); SA/B=Semifinals A/B; SC/D=Semifinals C/D; R=Repechage

== Sailing ==
Norway qualified one boat based on its performance at the Byte CII European Continental Qualifiers.

Athlete	Event	Race											Net Points	Final Rank
Athlete	Event	1	2	3	4	5	6	7	8	9	10	M*	Net Points	Final Rank
Caroline Rosmo	Girls' Byte CII	10	4	10	7	12	(17)	6	6	Cancelled		72.00	55.00	5

== Shooting ==
Norway was given a wild card to compete.

Individual

Athlete	Event	Qualification		Final	
Athlete	Event	Points	Rank	Points	Rank
Sara Stamnestro	Girls' 10m Air Pistol	358	18	Did not advance	

Team

Athletes	Event	Qualification		Round of 16	Quarterfinals	Semifinals	Final / BM	Rank
Athletes	Event	Points	Rank	Opposition Result	Opposition Result	Opposition Result	Opposition Result	Rank
Sara Stamnestro (NOR); Edouard Dortomb (FRA)	Mixed Team 10m Air Pistol							

== Swimming ==
Norway qualified four swimmers.

Boys

Athlete	Event	Heat		Semifinal		Final	
Athlete	Event	Time	Rank	Time	Rank	Time	Rank
Henrik Christiansen	200 m freestyle	1:51.89	12	—N/a		Did not advance	
Henrik Christiansen	400 m freestyle	3:53.58	6 Q	—N/a		3:51.55	3rd place, bronze medalist(s)
Henrik Christiansen	800 m freestyle	—N/a				7:57.07	3rd place, bronze medalist(s)
Armin Porobic	50 m backstroke	26.60	13 Q	26.26	11	Did not advance	
Armin Porobic	100 m backstroke	57.14	19	Did not advance			
Armin Porobic	200 m backstroke	2:04.29	12	—N/a		Did not advance	
Armin Porobic	50 m butterfly	24.86	9 Q	24.60	8 Q	24.25	5

Girls

Athlete	Event	Heat		Semifinal		Final	
Athlete	Event	Time	Rank	Time	Rank	Time	Rank
Elise Olsen	100 m freestyle	57.05	12 Q	56.60	14	Did not advance	
Elise Olsen	50 m butterfly	27.29	8 Q	27.01	5 Q	26.85	6
Elise Olsen	100 m butterfly	1:00.63	5 Q	1:00.41	8 Q	1:00.23	7
Sofie Reisaenen	50 m breaststroke	33.08	19	Did not advance			
Sofie Reisaenen	200 m breaststroke	2:35.49	17	—N/a		Did not advance	

Mixed

Athlete	Event	Heat		Final	
Athlete	Event	Time	Rank	Time	Rank
Henrik Christiansen; Elise Olsen; Armin Porobic; Sofie Reisaenen	4 × 100 m freestyle relay	3:41.72	13	Did not advance	
Henrik Christiansen; Elise Olsen; Armin Porobic; Sofie Reisaenen	4 × 100 m medley relay	4:01.25	10	Did not advance	

== Wrestling ==
Norway qualified one athlete based on its performance at the 2014 European Cadet Championships.

Key:

- VT - Victory by Fall.
- PP - Decision by Points - the loser with technical points.
- PO - Decision by Points - the loser without technical points.

Girls

Athlete	Event	Group stage				Final / RM	Rank
Athlete	Event	Opposition Score	Opposition Score	Opposition Score	Rank	Opposition Score	Rank
Grace Bullen	Freestyle -60kg	Mane (IND); W 4 - 0 ^{VT}	Larroque (FRA); W	Nandzo (CGO); W 4 - 0	1 Q	Pei (CHN); W 4 - 0 ^{ST}	1st place, gold medalist(s)
