= Beach volleyball at the 2014 Summer Youth Olympics – Boys' tournament =

The boys' beach volleyball tournament at the 2014 Youth Olympic Games in Nanjing, China, took place between 17 and 27 August at Nanjing Olympic Sports Center.

Thirty-Six pairs were competing, the host country China withdrew their pair. Africa and Asia hosted a single qualification tournament while Europe created a Youth Continental Cup with different zonal stages ending with a final qualification tournament. South America created a six legged tour, though only five events were held where the six countries with the most points qualified and North, Central America and Caribbean hosted four zonal tournaments where the winners qualified to the Youth Olympics and a final tournament where the top two nations qualified. The remaining were Wild Cards.

To be eligible to participate at the Youth Olympics athletes must have been born between 1 January 1996 and 31 December 1999.

== Qualification ==
Event	Location	Date	Total Teams	Qualified
Host Nation	-	-	0	~~China~~
EVCA Zone Qualification Tournament	(Saint Lucia) Pigeon Point	18–20 October 2013	1	Saint Vincent and the Grenadines
CAZOVA Zone Qualification Tournament	(Trinidad and Tobago) Maracus Bay	26–28 November 2013	1	Jamaica
Central Zone Qualification Tournament	(Puerto Rico) Fajardo	6–8 December 2013	1	Canada
AFECAVOL Zone Qualification Tournament	Guatemala City	1–2 February 2014	1	Guatemala
AVC Qualification Tournament	(Thailand) Nakhon Si Thammarat	4–6 April 2014	6	Indonesia; Iran; Kazakhstan; New Zealand; Sri Lanka; Thailand
CAVB Qualification Tournament	(Ghana) Accra	11–13 April 2014	6	Burundi; Republic of the Congo; Ghana; Nigeria; Rwanda; Sierra Leone
NORCECA Final Qualification Tournament	(Puerto Rico) Carolina	12–13 April 2014	2	Puerto Rico; United States
2014 CEV Youth Continental Cup Final	(Turkey) Antalya	15–17 May 2014	6	Finland; France; Germany; Poland; Russia; Ukraine
CSV Youth Tour Final Rankings	-	19 May 2014	6	Uruguay; Argentina; Venezuela; Peru; Paraguay; Brazil
Tripartite Invitation	-	-	3	Oman; São Tomé and Príncipe; Virgin Islands
Reallocation	-	-	3	Austria; Lithuania; Norway
TOTAL			36	

== Main draw ==
Teams were seeded is the preliminary round according to the following draw:

Rank	Team	NOC
1	~~Samuel Morris – Phillip Ayobami~~	Nigeria
2	Nate Moore – Kahurangi Robinson	New Zealand
3	Arnaud Gauthier-Rat – Arnaud Loiseau	France
4	Surin Jongklang – Banlue Nakprakhong	Thailand
5	Renato Bogarin – Elioth Frutos	Paraguay
6	Dominik Kmiecik – Jakub Macura	Poland
7	Elias Ndagano – Sylvestre Ndayisabye	Rwanda
8	Anders Berntsen Mol – Mathias Berntsen	Norway
9	Santiago Aulisi – Leo Aveiro	Argentina
10	Lumi Bramont – Jimy Heredia	Peru
11	Niklas Rudolf – Eric Stadie	Germany
12	Miro Määttänen – Santeri Siren	Finland
13	Samiei Alhammadi – Ahid Alsahi	Oman
14	Bryan Shavar – Rojey Hutchinson	Jamaica
15	Sergio Luis Figueroa – Daniel Rivera	Puerto Rico
16	Illia Kovalov – Oleh Plotnytskyi	Ukraine
17	Bosco Ndayishimiye – Fiston Niyongabo	Burundi
18	Rendy Licardo – Mohammad Ashfiya	Indonesia
19	Louis Richard – Torey DeFalco	United States
20	Oleg Stoyanovskiy – Artem Yarzutkin	Russia
21	~~Patrick Lombi – Abu Bakarr Kamara~~	Sierra Leone
22	Mohammadreza Shobeiri – Keyvan Sahneh	Iran
23	Arthur Lanci – George Wanderley	Brazil
24	Mauricio Vieyto – Marco Cairus	Uruguay
25	Delshun Welcome – Rodall Fraser	Saint Vincent and the Grenadines
26	Edvinas Vaškelis – Matas Navickas	Lithuania
27	Carlos Rosa – Ajai Sweeney	Virgin Islands
28	Andrew Richards – Jake MacNeil	Canada
29	Erik Flores – Mark Álvarez	Guatemala
30	Tigrito Gómez – Rolando Hernández	Venezuela
31	Johannes Kratz – Moritz Pristauz-Telsnigg	Austria
32	Thantrige Perera Mallawa – Isuru Madushan Siddihaluge	Sri Lanka
33	Aloisio De Souza – Alex Quaresma Marques	São Tomé and Príncipe
34	Philip Amissah – Nicholas Tetteh	Ghana
35	Moussa Botouli Ilombola – Johfrat Veldich Itoua Ossolo	Republic of the Congo
36	Yegor Dmitriyev – Sergey Polichshuk	Kazakhstan

== Competition Formula ==
The competition formula consist of two rounds, the first a pool round where the 36 teams have been divided into six pools of six, each pool will play round robin. After the pool round is completed, the best team from each pool plus the two best second place teams will advance to the eight-finals; the rest of the second place teams plus the third and fourth place teams from each pool will advance to the Round of 24. The Round of 24 is a single elimination round, the winning teams will play against the eight-finalists in another single elimination round; next the quarterfinals, semifinals and final matches.

On August 17, it was announced that two pools will only consist of five teams due to two pairings being restricted from competition due to an Ebola outbreak in their countries. The results of the matches against these two teams will be a direct forfeit.

== Preliminary round ==
=== Pool A ===
Pos	Team	Pld	W	L	Pts	SW	SL	SR	SPW	SPL	SPR	Qualification
1	(Uruguay) Vieyto–Cairus	5	5	0	10	10	1	10.000	174	119	1.462	Round of 16
2	(Finland) Määttänen–Siren	5	4	1	9	9	2	4.500	176	122	1.443	Round of 16
3	(Kazakhstan) Dmitriyev–Polichshuk	5	3	2	8	6	5	1.200	154	168	0.917	Round of 24
4	(Oman) Alhammadi–Alashi	5	2	3	7	4	7	0.571	136	176	0.773	Round of 24
5	(Saint Vincent and the Grenadines) Delshun–Fraser	5	1	4	6	4	8	0.500	139	194	0.716	
6	(Nigeria) Morris–Ayobami	5	0	5	5	0	10	0.000	0	210	0.000	

Date	Time		Score		Set 1	Set 2	Set 3	Total	Report
17 Aug	09:00	Määttänen–Siren (Finland)	2–0	(Saint Vincent and the Grenadines) Delshun–Fraser	21–11	21–11		42–22	
17 Aug	09:00	Alhammadi–Alashi (Oman)	0–2	(Uruguay) Vieyto–Cairus	12–21	12–21		24–42	
18 Aug	21:00	Vieyto–Cairus (Uruguay)	2–1	(Finland) Määttänen–Siren	21–14	11–21	16–14	48–49	
18 Aug	21:00	Dmitriyev–Polichshuk (Kazakhstan)	2–0	(Oman) Alhammadi–Alashi	21–17	21–19		42–36	
19 Aug	19:00	Alhammadi–Alashi (Oman)	0–2	(Finland) Määttänen–Siren	11–21	10–21		21–42	
19 Aug	19:00	Dmitriyev–Polichshuk (Kazakhstan)	2–1	(Saint Vincent and the Grenadines) Delshun–Fraser	19–21	21–14	15–12	55–47	
21 Aug	15:00	Määttänen–Siren (Finland)	2–0	(Kazakhstan) Dmitriyev–Polichshuk	22–20	21–11		43–31	
21 Aug	15:00	Delshun–Fraser (Saint Vincent and the Grenadines)	0–2	(Uruguay) Vieyto–Cairus	9–21	11–21		20–42	
22 Aug	09:00	Vieyto–Cairus (Uruguay)	0–2	(Kazakhstan) Dmitriyev–Polichshuk	13–21	13–21		26–42	
22 Aug	09:00	Delshun–Fraser (Saint Vincent and the Grenadines)	1–2	(Oman) Alhammadi–Alashi	15–21	21–18	14–16	50–55	

=== Pool B ===
Pos	Team	Pld	W	L	Pts	SW	SL	SR	SPW	SPL	SPR	Qualification
1	(Germany) Rudolf–Stadie	5	5	0	10	10	1	10.000	229	164	1.396	Round of 16
2	(Brazil) Arthur–George	5	4	1	9	9	2	4.500	227	164	1.384	Round of 16
3	(New Zealand) Moore–Robinson	5	3	2	8	6	5	1.200	191	195	0.979	Round of 24
4	(Lithuania) Vaskelis–Navickas	5	2	3	7	4	6	0.667	193	199	0.970	Round of 24
5	(Republic of the Congo) Botouli Ilombola–Itoua Ossolo	5	1	4	6	2	8	0.250	163	215	0.758	
6	(Jamaica) Shavar–Hutchinson	5	0	5	5	1	10	0.100	159	225	0.707	

Date	Time		Score		Set 1	Set 2	Set 3	Total	Report
17 Aug	10:00	Moore–Robinson (New Zealand)	2–0	(Republic of the Congo) Botouli Ilombola–Itoua Ossolo	21–8	22–20		43–28	
17 Aug	10:00	Vaskelis–Navickas (Lithuania)	0–2	(Germany) Rudolf–Stadie	17–21	18–21		35–42	
17 Aug	11:00	Arthur–George (Brazil)	2–0	(Jamaica) Shavar–Hutchinson	21–8	21–12		42–20	
18 Aug	10:00	Rudolf–Stadie (Germany)	2–1	(Brazil) Arthur–George	24–26	22–20	15–12	61–58	
18 Aug	19:00	Moore–Robinson (New Zealand)	2–0	(Lithuania) Vaskelis–Navickas	21–19	21–18		42–37	
18 Aug	20:00	Botouli Ilombola–Itoua Ossolo (Republic of the Congo)	2–0	(Jamaica) Shavar–Hutchinson	23–21	21–17		44–38	
19 Aug	20:00	Arthur–George (Brazil)	2–0	(New Zealand) Moore–Robinson	21–17	21–10		42–27	
19 Aug	21:00	Rudolf–Stadie (Germany)	2–0	(Jamaica) Shavar–Hutchinson	21–12	21–15		42–27	
19 Aug	21:00	Vaskelis–Navickas (Lithuania)	2–0	(Republic of the Congo) Botouli Ilombola–Itoua Ossolo	21–19	28–26		49–45	
21 Aug	16:00	Shavar–Hutchinson (Jamaica)	1–2	(New Zealand) Moore–Robinson	19–21	21–19	6–15	46–55	
21 Aug	16:00	Botouli Ilombola–Itoua Ossolo (Republic of the Congo)	0–2	(Germany) Rudolf–Stadie	9–21	11–21		20–42	
21 Aug	19:00	Arthur–George (Brazil)	2–0	(Lithuania) Vaskelis–Navickas	21–12	21–18		42–30	
22 Aug	10:00	Rudolf–Stadie (Germany)	2–0	(New Zealand) Moore–Robinson	21–18	21–10		42–28	
22 Aug	10:00	Vaskelis–Navickas (Lithuania)	2–0	(Jamaica) Shavar–Hutchinson	21–18	21–10		42–28	
22 Aug	11:00	Botouli Ilombola–Itoua Ossolo (Republic of the Congo)	0–2	(Brazil) Arthur–George	20–22	6–21		26–43	

=== Pool C ===
Pos	Team	Pld	W	L	Pts	SW	SL	SR	SPW	SPL	SPR	Qualification
1	(Puerto Rico) Figueroa–Rivera	5	5	0	10	10	1	10.000	222	138	1.609	Round of 16
2	(France) Gauthier-Rat–Loiseau	5	4	1	9	9	2	4.500	216	130	1.662	Round of 16
3	(Ghana) Amissah–Tetteh	5	3	2	8	6	7	0.857	218	234	0.932	Round of 24
4	(Peru) Lumi–Jimy	5	2	3	7	5	7	0.714	209	216	0.968	Round of 24
5	(Iran) Shobeiri–Sahneh	5	1	4	6	4	8	0.500	196	218	0.899	
6	(United States Virgin Islands) Rosa – Sweeney	5	0	5	5	1	10	0.100	97	223	0.435	

Date	Time		Score		Set 1	Set 2	Set 3	Total	Report
17 Aug	11:00	Amissah–Tetteh (Ghana)	0–2	(France) Gauthier-Rat–Loiseau	9–21	11–21		20–42	
17 Aug	15:00	Rosa – Sweeney (United States Virgin Islands)	0–2	(Peru) Lumi–Jimy	10–21	6–21		16–42	
17 Aug	15:00	Shobeiri–Sahneh (Iran)	0–2	(Puerto Rico) Figueroa–Rivera	13–21	11–21		24–42	
18 Aug	9:00	Rosa – Sweeney (United States Virgin Islands)	0–2	(France) Gauthier-Rat–Loiseau	4–21	9–21		13–42	
18 Aug	9:00	Shobeiri–Sahneh (Iran)	1–2	(Peru) Lumi–Jimy	18–21	23–21	16–18	57–60	
18 Aug	10:00	Amissah–Tetteh (Ghana)	0–2	(Puerto Rico) Figueroa–Rivera	13–21	16–21		29–42	
19 Aug	15:00	Rosa – Sweeney (United States Virgin Islands)	1–2	(Ghana) Amissah–Tetteh	21–19	13–21	9–15	43–55	
19 Aug	16:00	Figueroa–Rivera (Puerto Rico)	2–1	(Peru) Lumi–Jimy	21–17	21–13		42–30	
19 Aug	20:00	Shobeiri–Sahneh (Iran)	0–2	(France) Gauthier-Rat–Loiseau	7–21	15–21		22–42	
21 Aug	19:00	Figueroa–Rivera (Puerto Rico)	2–1	(France) Gauthier-Rat–Loiseau	21–17	18–21	15–10	54–48	
21 Aug	20:00	Amissah–Tetteh (Ghana)	2–1	(Peru) Lumi–Jimy	16–21	21–15	22–20	59–56	
21 Aug	20:00	Rosa – Sweeney (United States Virgin Islands)	0–2	(Iran) Shobeiri–Sahneh	6–21	12–21		18–42	
22 Aug	11:00	Lumi–Jimy (Peru)	0–2	(France) Gauthier-Rat–Loiseau	14–21	7–21		21–42	
22 Aug	15:00	Amissah–Tetteh (Ghana)	2–1	(Iran) Shobeiri–Sahneh	17–21	24–22	14–8 INJ	55–51	
22 Aug	15:00	Rosa – Sweeney (United States Virgin Islands)	0–2	(Puerto Rico) Figueroa–Rivera	2–21	5–21		7–42	

=== Pool D ===
Pos	Team	Pld	W	L	Pts	SW	SL	SR	SPW	SPL	SPR	Qualification
1	(Ukraine) Kovalov–Plotnytskyi	5	4	1	9	9	2	4.500	187	150	1.247	Round of 16
2	(Argentina) Aulisi–Aveiro	5	4	1	9	8	3	2.667	167	132	1.265	Round of 16
3	(Canada) Richards–MacNeil	5	3	2	8	7	4	1.750	164	155	1.058	Round of 24
4	(Thailand) Jongklang–Nakprakhong	5	3	2	8	6	5	1.200	169	166	1.018	Round of 24
5	(São Tomé and Príncipe) De Souza–Marques	5	1	4	6	2	8	0.250	84	168	0.500	
6	(Sierra Leone) Lombi–Kamara	5	0	5	5	0	10	0.000	0	210	0.000	

=== Pool E ===
Pos	Team	Pld	W	L	Pts	SW	SL	SR	SPW	SPL	SPR	Qualification
1	(Russia) Stoyanovskiy–Yarzutkin	5	5	0	10	10	0	MAX	210	143	1.469	Round of 16
2	(Norway) Mol–Berntsen	5	4	1	9	8	2	4.000	203	144	1.410	Round of 16
3	(Sri Lanka) Mallawa–Siddihaluge	5	2	3	7	5	7	0.714	205	206	0.995	Round of 24
4	(Paraguay) Bogarin–Frutos	5	2	3	7	5	6	0.833	181	202	0.896	Round of 24
5	(Guatemala) Flores–Álvarez	5	2	3	7	4	7	0.571	177	208	0.851	
6	(Burundi) Ndayishimiye–Niyongabo	5	0	5	5	0	10	0.000	137	210	0.652	

=== Pool F ===
Pos	Team	Pld	W	L	Pts	SW	SL	SR	SPW	SPL	SPR	Qualification
1	(Venezuela) Gómez–Hernández	5	5	0	10	10	1	10.000	219	153	1.431	Round of 16
2	(Indonesia) Licardo–Ashfiya	5	4	1	9	8	2	4.000	200	175	1.143	Round of 16
3	(Austria) Kratz–Pristauz-Telsnigg	5	3	2	8	6	4	1.500	201	180	1.117	Round of 24
4	(Poland) Kmiecik–Macura	5	2	3	7	5	6	0.833	193	198	0.975	Round of 24
5	(United States) Richard–DeFalco	5	1	4	6	2	8	0.250	179	197	0.909	
6	(Rwanda) Ndagano–Ndayisabye	5	0	5	5	0	10	0.000	121	210	0.576	
