= Sri Lanka at the 2014 Summer Youth Olympics =

- IOC code: SRI
- NOC: National Olympic Committee of Sri Lanka

in Nanjing
- Competitors: 9 in 6 sports
- Flag bearer: Matthew Abeysinghe
- Medals: Gold 0 Silver 0 Bronze 0 Total 0

Summer Youth Olympics appearances
- 2010; 2014; 2018

Sri Lanka competed at the 2014 Summer Youth Olympics, in Nanjing, China from 16 August to 28 August 2014. The Sri Lankan team consisted of nine athletes in six sports.

== Medalists ==
Medals awarded to participants of mixed-NOC (Combined) teams are represented in italics. These medals are not counted towards the individual NOC medal tally.

Medal	Name	Sport	Event	Date
Bronze	Sachin Dias	Badminton	Mixed Doubles	22 Aug

== Athletics ==
Sri Lanka qualified one male athlete in the Youth Olympic Trials held in Bangkok, Thailand from May 21–22, 2014.

Qualification Legend: Q=Final A (medal); qB=Final B (non-medal); qC=Final C (non-medal); qD=Final D (non-medal); qE=Final E (non-medal)

Boys
Track & road events

Athlete	Event	Heats		Final	
Athlete	Event	Result	Rank	Result	Rank
Anuruddha Vidusanka	400 m hurdles	53.31	10 qB	53.30	12

== Badminton ==
Sri Lanka qualified one maleathlete based on the 2 May 2014 BWF Junior World Rankings. Later Sri Lanka was given a female quota to compete by the tripartite committee.

Singles

Athlete	Event	Group stage				Quarterfinal	Semifinal	Final / BM	Rank
Athlete	Event	Opposition Score	Opposition Score	Opposition Score	Rank	Opposition Score	Opposition Score	Opposition Score	Rank
Sachin Dias	Boys' Singles	Abdelhakim (EGY); W 21–11, 21–9	Nzoussi (CGO); W 21–5, 21–8	Ginting (INA); L 10–21, 21–23	2	did not advance			
Thilini Hendahewa	Girls' Singles	Blichfeldt (DEN); W 21–18, 21–15	Yamaguchi (JPN); L 13–21, 6–21	Cadeau (SEY); W 21–3, 21–6	2	did not advance			

Doubles

Athlete	Event	Group stage				Quarterfinal	Semifinal	Final / BM	Rank
Athlete	Event	Opposition Score	Opposition Score	Opposition Score	Rank	Opposition Score	Opposition Score	Opposition Score	Rank
He Bingjiao (CHN); Sachin Dias (SRI)	Mixed Doubles	Courtois (FRA); Sebunnya (UGA); W 2 – 0	Hendahewa (SRI); Ong (SIN); W 2 – 0	Shivani (IND); Ayittey (GHA); W w/o	1 Q	Beton (SLO); Ginting (INA); W 2 – 1	Lee (TPE); Tsuneyama (JPN); L 1 – 2	Qin (CHN); Narongrit (THA); W 2 – 0	3rd place, bronze medalist(s)
Thilini Hendahewa (SRI); Bernard Ong (SIN)	Mixed Doubles	Shivani (IND); Ayittey (GHA); W w/o	He (CHN); Dias (SRI); L 0 – 2	Courtois (FRA); Sebunnya (UGA); W 2 – 0	2	did not advance			

== Beach Volleyball ==
Sri Lanka qualified a boys' team by their performance at the AVC Qualification Tournament.

Athletes	Event	Preliminary round	Standing	Round of 24	Round of 16	Quarterfinals	Semifinals	Final / BM	Rank
Athletes	Event	Opposition Score	Standing	Opposition Score	Opposition Score	Opposition Score	Opposition Score	Opposition Score	Rank
Isuru Madushan; Chamika Sandaruwan	Boys'	Frutos Toewn/Cacares (PAR); W 2 – 1	3 Q	Ashfiya/Licardo (INA); L 0 – 2	did not advance				17
Isuru Madushan; Chamika Sandaruwan	Boys'	Ndayishimiye/Pniyongabo (BDI); W 2 – 0	3 Q	Ashfiya/Licardo (INA); L 0 – 2	did not advance				17
Isuru Madushan; Chamika Sandaruwan	Boys'	Alvarez/Flores (GUA); L 1 – 2	3 Q	Ashfiya/Licardo (INA); L 0 – 2	did not advance				17
Isuru Madushan; Chamika Sandaruwan	Boys'	Berntsen/Mol (NOR); L 0 – 2	3 Q	Ashfiya/Licardo (INA); L 0 – 2	did not advance				17
Isuru Madushan; Chamika Sandaruwan	Boys'	Iarzutkin/Stoyanovskiy (RUS); L 0 – 2	3 Q	Ashfiya/Licardo (INA); L 0 – 2	did not advance				17

== Rowing ==
Sri Lanka was given a boat to compete by the tripartite committee.

Athlete	Event	Heats		Repechage		Semifinals		Final	
Athlete	Event	Time	Rank	Time	Rank	Time	Rank	Time	Rank
Vishan Mario Gunatilleka	Boys' Single Sculls	3:59.01	6 R	3:50.56	5 SC/D	3:50.87	6 FD	3:49.53	22

Qualification Legend: FA=Final A (medal); FB=Final B (non-medal); FC=Final C (non-medal); FD=Final D (non-medal); SA/B=Semifinals A/B; SC/D=Semifinals C/D; R=Repechage

== Swimming ==
Sri Lanka qualified two swimmers. In the five races the two swimmers competed in, all five produced new national records.

Boys

Athlete	Event	Heat		Semifinal		Final	
Athlete	Event	Time	Rank	Time	Rank	Time	Rank
Matthew Abeysinghe	100 m freestyle	50.87 NR	13 Q	50.86 NR	13	did not advance	
Matthew Abeysinghe	200 m freestyle	1:52.41 NR	15	—		did not advance	

Girls

Athlete	Event	Heat		Semifinal		Final	
Athlete	Event	Time	Rank	Time	Rank	Time	Rank
Machiko Raheem	50 m freestyle	26.79 NR	23	did not advance			
Machiko Raheem	100 m freestyle	58.50 NR	28	did not advance			

== Tennis ==
Sri Lanka was given a quota to compete by the tripartite committee.

Singles

Athlete	Event	Round of 32	Round of 16	Quarterfinals	Semifinals	Final / BM	Rank
Athlete	Event	Opposition Score	Opposition Score	Opposition Score	Opposition Score	Opposition Score	Rank
Sharmal Dissanayake	Boys' Singles	K Khachanov (RUS); L 0 – 6, 0 – 6	did not advance				

Doubles

Athletes	Event	Round of 32	Round of 16	Quarterfinals	Semifinals	Final / BM	Rank
Athletes	Event	Opposition Score	Opposition Score	Opposition Score	Opposition Score	Opposition Score	Rank
Sharmal Dissanayake (SRI); Pavle Rogan (MNE)	Boys' Doubles	—	N Álvarez (PER); JJ Rosas (PER); L 2 – 6, 3 – 6	did not advance			
Ojasvinee Singh (IND); Sharmal Dissanayake (SRI)	Mixed Doubles	S Kenin (USA); A Rybakov (USA); L 2 – 6, 6 – 4, [9] – [11]	did not advance				
