= Reshma Mane =

Indian wrestler

Personal information
- Born: Vedange

Professional wrestling career

Reshma Mane is an Indian female wrestler who hails from Vedange in Kolhapur district of Maharashtra. She competes in the 62 kg category of freestyle wrestling.

== Career ==
Mane first garnered attention by winning gold in both senior and junior National Championship of wrestling in 2016. She also won a bronze medal in Asian Cadet Championship held in Bishke, Kyrgyzstan. She was also selected to represent India in the U-23 World Championships in 2017. Reshma was part of the Indian contingent that participated in 2014 Youth Olympics.

She became the first female wrestler from Maharashtra to take part in Vivo PWL 3.
