= Edvinas Vaškelis =

Lithuanian volleyball player (born 1996)

Personal information
- Full name: Edvinas Vaškelis
- Nationality: Lithuanian
- Born: 20 June 1996; Vilkaviškis, Lithuania
- Height: 193 cm (6 ft 4 in)
- Weight: 92 kg (203 lb)
- Spike: 320 cm (126 in)
- Block: 310 cm (122 in)

Career
Years	Teams
(Lithuania) Elga Šiauliai (Lithuania) Flamingo Volley Vilnius (Estonia) Pärnu VK (Belgium) Prefaxis Menen (Lithuania) TK Rūta (Germany) Volleyball Bisons Bühl	2014–2016; 2016–2017; 2017–2018; 2018; 2018–2019; 2019 -

Edvinas Vaškelis (born 20 June 1996 in Vilkaviškis, Lithuania) is a Lithuanian volleyball player who currently playing for Volleyball Bisons Bühl playing in Deutsche Volleyball-Bundesliga.

In 2014 Vaškelis represented Lithuania in 2014 Summer Youth Olympics.
