= Jimy Heredia =

Peruvian volleyball player (born 1997)

Personal information
- Born: April 15, 1997 (age 28); Lima, Peru
- Height: 5 ft 8 in (1.73 m)
- Weight: 68 kg (150 lb)

Sport
- Country: Peru
- Sport: Beach volleyball

Jimy Stiven Heredia (born 15 April 1997) is a Peruvian volleyball and beach volleyball player who represented his country at the beach volleyball tournament of the 2014 Summer Youth Olympics in Nanjing, China.

Heredia currently plays the South American Beach Volleyball Circuit.

== Results ==
Summer Youth Olympics

- 2014: 17th
