= Triathlon at the 2014 Summer Youth Olympics =

Triathlon at the II Summer Youth Olympic Games
- Venue: Xuanwu Lake
- Dates: 17–21 August
- No. of events: 3 (1 boys, 1 girls, 1 mixed)
- Competitors: 64 (32 boys, 32 girls) from 39 nations

Triathlon at the 2014 Summer Youth Olympics was held from 17 to 21 August at Xuanwu Lake in Nanjing, China.

== Qualification ==
Each National Olympic Committee (NOC) can enter a maximum of 2 competitors, 1 per each gender. As hosts, China was given the maximum quota, but only selected a female athlete thus the other quota was reallocated to the next best Asian performer. A further 4, 2 in each gender was decided by the Tripartite Commission. The remaining 58 places shall be decided by qualification events, namely five continental qualification tournaments.

To be eligible to participate at the Youth Olympics athletes must have been born between 1 January 1997 and 31 December 1998.

=== Boys ===
Event	Location	Date	Total Places	Qualified
Host Nation	-	-	0	~~China~~
2014 Oceania YOG Qualifier	(Australia) Penrith	11–12 January 2014	2	Australia; New Zealand
2014 African YOG Qualifier	(South Africa) East London	23 March 2014	3	Egypt; South Africa; Zimbabwe
2014 American YOG Qualifier	(Mexico) Monterrey	2–4 May 2014	8	United States; Canada; Venezuela; Chile; Mexico; Colombia; Cuba; El Salvador
2014 European YOG Qualifier	(Netherlands) Weert	17–18 May 2014	11	Austria; Belgium; Denmark; Germany; Great Britain; Hungary; Israel; Italy; Portugal; Russia; Spain
2014 Asian YOG Qualifier	(Kazakhstan) Burabay	1–2 June 2014	6	Hong Kong; Japan; Kazakhstan; South Korea; Singapore; Chinese Taipei
Tripartite Invitation	-	-	2	Bermuda; Solomon Islands
TOTAL			32	

=== Girls ===
Event	Location	Date	Total Places	Qualified
Host Nation	-	-	1	China
2014 Oceania YOG Qualifier	(Australia) Penrith	11–12 January 2014	2	Australia; New Zealand
2014 African YOG Qualifier	(South Africa) East London	23 March 2014	3	Egypt; South Africa; Zimbabwe
2014 American YOG Qualifier	(Mexico) Monterrey	2–4 May 2014	8	United States; Canada; Mexico; Chile; Brazil; Colombia; Venezuela; El Salvador
2014 European YOG Qualifier	(Netherlands) Weert	17–18 May 2014	11	Austria; Belgium; Denmark; France; Germany; Great Britain; Hungary; Netherlands; Russia; Spain; Ukraine
2014 Asian YOG Qualifier	(Kazakhstan) Burabay	1–2 June 2014	5	Hong Kong; Japan; South Korea; Philippines; Singapore
Tripartite Invitation	-	-	2	Bermuda; Costa Rica
TOTAL			32	

== Schedule ==
The schedule was released by the ITU.

All times are CST (UTC+8)

Event date	Event day	Starting time	Event details
August 17	Sunday	09:00	Girls' Race
August 18	Monday	09:00	Boys' Race
August 21	Thursday	09:00	Mixed Team Relay

== Medal summary ==
=== Medal table ===
Rank	Nation	Gold	Silver	Bronze	Total
1	Australia	1	0	0	1
1	Great Britain	1	0	0	1
3	New Zealand	0	1	0	1
3	United States	0	1	0	1
5	Denmark	0	0	1	1
5	France	0	0	1	1
Totals (6 entries)		2	2	2	6

=== Events ===
Event	Gold	Silver	Bronze
Boys'	Ben Dijkstra; Great Britain	Daniel Hoy; New Zealand	Emil Deleuran Hansen; Denmark
Girls'	Brittany Dutton; Australia	Stephanie Jenks; United States	Émilie Morier; France
Mixed Relay	Europe 1 Ben Dijkstra; Great Britain; Emil Deleuran Hansen; Denmark; Émilie Morier; France; Kristin Ranwig; Germany	Europe 3 Carmen Gomez Cortes; Spain; Bence Lehmann; Hungary; Sian Rainsley; Great Britain; Giulio Soldati; Italy	Oceania 1 Brittany Dutton; Australia; Daniel Hoy; New Zealand; Elizabeth Stannard; New Zealand; Jack van Stekelenburg; Australia
