= Uruguay at the 2014 Summer Youth Olympics =

- IOC code: URU
- NOC: Uruguayan Olympic Committee

in Nanjing
- Competitors: 22 in 8 sports
- Flag bearer: Dolores Moreira
- Medals: Gold 0 Silver 0 Bronze 0 Total 0

Summer Youth Olympics appearances
- 2010; 2014; 2018; 2026

Uruguay competed at the 2014 Summer Youth Olympics, in Nanjing, China from 16 August to 28 August 2014.

Sailor Dolores Moreira was named the flagbearer of the country at the opening ceremony.

== Athletics ==
Uruguay qualified one athlete.

Qualification Legend: Q=Final A (medal); qB=Final B (non-medal); qC=Final C (non-medal); qD=Final D (non-medal); qE=Final E (non-medal)

Boys
Field Events

Athlete	Event	Qualification		Final	
Athlete	Event	Distance	Rank	Distance	Rank
Martín Castañares	Pole vault	4.45 PB	13 qB	4.40	14

== Basketball ==
Uruguay qualified a boys' team based on the 1 June 2014 FIBA 3x3 National Federation Rankings.

=== Boys' tournament ===
Roster

- Gaston de Orta
- Brian Gonzalez
- Joaquin Jones
- Camilo Marino

Group Stage

Pos	Team	Pld	W	L	PF	PA	PD	Pts	Qualification
1	Lithuania	9	9	0	165	129	+36	18	Round of 16
2	Slovenia	9	7	2	152	120	+32	16	Round of 16
3	China	9	6	3	164	143	+21	15 (Note: CHN +1, PUR −1)	Round of 16
4	Puerto Rico	9	6	3	152	136	+16	15	Round of 16
5	Poland	9	5	4	153	127	+26	14	Round of 16
6	France	9	4	5	151	127	+24	13	Round of 16
7	Hungary	9	3	6	158	165	−7	12	Round of 16
8	Uruguay	9	2	7	103	154	−51	11 (Note: URU +1, GER −1)	Round of 16
9	Germany	9	2	7	118	149	−31	11	Eliminated
10	Indonesia	9	1	8	86	152	−66	10	Eliminated

Notes:

18 August 2014
17:40

Uruguay	11–10	Indonesia

Wutaishan Sports Center, Nanjing

18 August 2014
20:20

China	21–11	Uruguay

Wutaishan Sports Center, Nanjing

19 August 2014
19:00

Uruguay	12–21	Hungary

Wutaishan Sports Center, Nanjing

20 August 2014
18:20

Germany	14–15	Uruguay

Wutaishan Sports Center, Nanjing

20 August 2014
20:40

Uruguay	11–13	Slovenia

Wutaishan Sports Center, Nanjing

22 August 2014
20:00

Uruguay	12–15	Lithuania

Wutaishan Sports Center, Nanjing

23 August 2014
17:20

Poland	22–5	Uruguay

Wutaishan Sports Center, Nanjing

23 August 2014
20:20

Uruguay	13–17	France

Wutaishan Sports Center, Nanjing

24 August 2014
18:40

Puerto Rico	21–13	Uruguay

Wutaishan Sports Center, Nanjing

Knockout Stage

Round of 16	Quarterfinals	Semifinals	Final	Rank
Opposition Score	Opposition Score	Opposition Score	Opposition Score	Rank
Argentina; L 13-20	did not advance			16

== Beach Volleyball ==
Uruguay qualified a boys' and girls' team from their performance at the 2014 CSV Youth Beach Volleyball Tour.

Athletes	Event	Preliminary round	Standing	Round of 24	Round of 16	Quarterfinals	Semifinals	Final / BM	Rank
Athletes	Event	Opposition Score	Standing	Opposition Score	Opposition Score	Opposition Score	Opposition Score	Opposition Score	Rank
Marco Cairus Lucarelli; Mauricio Vieyto	Boys'	Al Hammadi/Al Sahi (OMA); W 2 – 0	1 Q	Bye	Jongklang/Nakprakhong (THA); W 2 – 1	Määttänen/Sirén (FIN); L 1 – 2	did not advance		9
Marco Cairus Lucarelli; Mauricio Vieyto	Boys'	Määttänen/Sirén (FIN); W 2 – 1	1 Q	Bye	Jongklang/Nakprakhong (THA); W 2 – 1	Määttänen/Sirén (FIN); L 1 – 2	did not advance		9
Marco Cairus Lucarelli; Mauricio Vieyto	Boys'	Akande/Morris (NGR); W w/o	1 Q	Bye	Jongklang/Nakprakhong (THA); W 2 – 1	Määttänen/Sirén (FIN); L 1 – 2	did not advance		9
Marco Cairus Lucarelli; Mauricio Vieyto	Boys'	Fraser/Welcome (VIN); W 2 – 0	1 Q	Bye	Jongklang/Nakprakhong (THA); W 2 – 1	Määttänen/Sirén (FIN); L 1 – 2	did not advance		9
Marco Cairus Lucarelli; Mauricio Vieyto	Boys'	Dmitriyev/Polichshuk (KAZ); W 2 – 0	1 Q	Bye	Jongklang/Nakprakhong (THA); W 2 – 1	Määttänen/Sirén (FIN); L 1 – 2	did not advance		9
Lia Fortunati Beltran; Maria Rotti Giordano	Girls'	Eti/Sakalia (TUV); W 2 – 0	1 Q	Bye	Gesslbauer/Radl (AUT); L 0 – 2	did not advance			17
Lia Fortunati Beltran; Maria Rotti Giordano	Girls'	Bitrus/Audu (NGR); W w/o	1 Q	Bye	Gesslbauer/Radl (AUT); L 0 – 2	did not advance			17
Lia Fortunati Beltran; Maria Rotti Giordano	Girls'	Mondesir/Noel (LCA); W 2 – 0	1 Q	Bye	Gesslbauer/Radl (AUT); L 0 – 2	did not advance			17
Lia Fortunati Beltran; Maria Rotti Giordano	Girls'	Çetin/Yurtsever (TUR); W	1 Q	Bye	Gesslbauer/Radl (AUT); L 0 – 2	did not advance			17
Lia Fortunati Beltran; Maria Rotti Giordano	Girls'	Pan/Song (TPE); W	1 Q	Bye	Gesslbauer/Radl (AUT); L 0 – 2	did not advance			17

== Equestrian ==
Uruguay qualified a rider.

Athlete	Horse	Event	Round 1		Round 2			Total	
Athlete	Horse	Event	Penalties	Rank	Penalties	Total	Rank	Penalties	Rank
Francisco Calvelo Martinez	Lord Power	Individual Jumping	8	16	4		4	12	10
South America; Martina Campi (ARG); Bianca de Souza Rodrigues (BRA); Antoine Porte (CHI); Valeria Jimenez Caballero (PAR); Francisco Calvelo Martinez (URU)	Darina; La Gomera; Zyralynn; Cenai; Lord Power	Team Jumping	4; ~~EL~~; ~~20~~; 0; 0	2	0; ~~20~~; ~~8~~; 0; 0	4	2	4	2nd place, silver medalist(s)

== Field hockey ==
Uruguay qualified a girls' team based on its performance at the 2014 Youth American Championship.

=== Girls' tournament ===
Roster

- Valeria Agazzi Galeano
- Milagros Algorta Ferrari
- Constanza Barrandeguy Fernandez
- Maria Cecilia Casarotti Gaminara
- Lucia Castro Saenz de Zumaran
- Paula Costa Puig
- Augustina Domingo Esposto
- Barbara Petrik Vidal
- Augustina Sanchez Greppi

Group Stage

Pos	Team	Pld	W	D	L	GF	GA	GD	Pts	Qualification
1	China	4	4	0	0	29	3	+26	12	Quarterfinals
2	Uruguay	4	3	0	1	19	8	+11	9	Quarterfinals
3	New Zealand	4	2	0	2	20	20	0	6	Quarterfinals
4	Germany	4	1	0	3	8	23	−15	3	Quarterfinals
5	Zambia	4	0	0	4	8	30	−22	0	

Source: FIH
Rules for classification: 1) points; 2) goal difference; 3) goals scored; 4) head-to-head result.

17 August 2014
19:30

Germany	2–6	Uruguay
Angerer 2'; Bittel 29'	Report	Saenz 9'; Casarotti 11', 28'; Galeano 13'; Barrandeguy 31'; Ferrari 34'

Umpires:
Ana Faias (POR)
Denise Pelletier (CAN)

18 August 2014
20:30

China	2–0	Uruguay
Zhang Jinrong 10', 24'	Report

Umpires:
Tanja Schafer (RSA)
Ana Escalante (MEX)

19 August 2014
20:30

Uruguay	7–1	Zambia
Gaminara 5', 20', 30'; Saenz 13', 18', 27', 32'	Report	Mudenda 31'

Umpires:
Emily Carroll (AUS)
Denise Pelletier (CAN)

21 August 2014
17:30

New Zealand	3–6	Uruguay
Kwek 12'; Davies 32'; Kiddle 34'	Report	Gaminara 1', 10'; Fernan 2', 22'; Galeano 6'; Saenz 27'

Umpires:
Toh Li Min (SIN)
Ivona Makar (CRO)

Quarterfinal

23 August 2014
16:30

Uruguay	0–9	Argentina
	Report	Ortiz 2'; Jankunas 3', 28', 34'; Gustavino 6'; Dichiara 8'; Toccalino 29'; Trinchinetti 31', 33'

Umpires:
Ivona Makar (CRO)
Ana Escalante (MEX)

Crossover

24 August 2014
16:30

Germany	0–2	Uruguay
	Report	Gaminara 1'; Fernan 13'

Umpires:
Denise Pelletier (CAN)
Lucy Townend (NZL)

Fifth and sixth place

26 August 2014
17:30

Uruguay	4–5	New Zealand
Gaminara 5', 27', 33'; Galeano 33'	Report	Brown 8'; Waddell 14', 34'; White 28'; Robinson 30'

Umpires:
Toh Li Min (SIN)
Liu Lijie (CHN)

== Sailing ==
Uruguay qualified one boat based on its performance at the Byte CII Central & South American Continental Qualifiers.

Athlete	Event	Race								Net Points	Final Rank
Athlete	Event	1	2	3	4	5	6	7	8	Net Points	Final Rank
Dolores Moreira	Girls' Byte CII	4	(19)	14	16	18	15	4	1	72	9

== Swimming ==
Uruguay qualified one swimmer.

Girls

Athlete	Event	Heat		Semifinal		Final	
Athlete	Event	Time	Rank	Time	Rank	Time	Rank
Carolina di Lorenzi Gonzalez	50 m breaststroke	35.26	28	did not advance			
Carolina di Lorenzi Gonzalez	100 m breaststroke	1:16.03	26	did not advance			

== Table Tennis ==
Uruguay qualified one athlete based on its performance at the Latin American Qualification Event.

Singles

Athlete	Event	Group Stage	Rank	Round of 16	Quarterfinals	Semifinals	Final / BM	Rank
Athlete	Event	Opposition Score	Rank	Opposition Score	Opposition Score	Opposition Score	Opposition Score	Rank
Maria Lorenzotti	Girls	Group G Diaconu (ROU); L 1 - 3	2 Q	Kato (JPN); L 1 - 4	did not advance			9
Maria Lorenzotti	Girls	Ryabova (KAZ); W 3 - 2	2 Q	Kato (JPN); L 1 - 4	did not advance			9
Maria Lorenzotti	Girls	Wan (GER); W 3 - 2	2 Q	Kato (JPN); L 1 - 4	did not advance			9

Team

Athletes	Event	Group Stage	Rank	Round of 16	Quarterfinals	Semifinals	Final / BM	Rank
Athletes	Event	Opposition Score	Rank	Opposition Score	Opposition Score	Opposition Score	Opposition Score	Rank
Latin America 1 Maria Lorenzotti (URU); Hugo Calderano (BRA)	Mixed	Europe 3 Giorgia Piccolin (ITA); Elia Schmid (SUI); W 2–1	1 Q	Europe 2 Elias Ranefur (SWE); Nicole Trosman (ISR); L 1–2	did not advance			16
Latin America 1 Maria Lorenzotti (URU); Hugo Calderano (BRA)	Mixed	Germany; Kilian Ort (GER); Yuan Wan (GER); W 3–0	1 Q	Europe 2 Elias Ranefur (SWE); Nicole Trosman (ISR); L 1–2	did not advance			16
Latin America 1 Maria Lorenzotti (URU); Hugo Calderano (BRA)	Mixed	Africa 1 Kerem Ben Yahia (TUN); Sannah Lagsir (ALG); W 3–0	1 Q	Europe 2 Elias Ranefur (SWE); Nicole Trosman (ISR); L 1–2	did not advance			16

Qualification Legend: Q=Main Bracket (medal); qB=Consolation Bracket (non-medal)
