= Tuvalu at the 2014 Summer Youth Olympics =

- IOC code: TUV
- NOC: Tuvalu Association of Sports and National Olympic Committee

in Nanjing
- Competitors: 3 in 2 sports
- Medals: Gold 0 Silver 0 Bronze 0 Total 0

Summer Youth Olympics appearances
- 2010; 2014; 2018

Tuvalu competed at the 2014 Summer Youth Olympics, in Nanjing, China from 16 August to 28 August 2014.

== Athletics ==
Tuvalu qualified one athlete.

Qualification Legend: Q=Final A (medal); qB=Final B (non-medal); qC=Final C (non-medal); qD=Final D (non-medal); qE=Final E (non-medal)

Boys
Field Events

| Athlete | Event | Qualification | | Final | |
| Athlete | Event | Distance | Rank | Distance | Rank |
|---|---|---|---|---|---|
| Taui Saiasi Hauma | Discus throw | NM qB | | 33.45 | 16 |

== Beach Volleyball ==
Tuvalu was given a team to compete from the tripartite committee.

| Athletes | Event | Preliminary round | Standing | Round of 24 | Round of 16 | Quarterfinals | Semifinals | Final / BM | Rank |
| Athletes | Event | Opposition Score | Standing | Opposition Score | Opposition Score | Opposition Score | Opposition Score | Opposition Score | Rank |
|---|---|---|---|---|---|---|---|---|---|
| Loluama Eti; Valisi Sakalia | Girls' | Noel/Faucher (LCA); L 0 – 2 | 5 | did not advance | | | | | |
| Loluama Eti; Valisi Sakalia | Girls' | Song/Pan (TPE); L 0 – 2 | 5 | did not advance | | | | | |
| Loluama Eti; Valisi Sakalia | Girls' | Bitrus/Audu (NGR); W w/o | 5 | did not advance | | | | | |
| Loluama Eti; Valisi Sakalia | Girls' | Fortunati/Rotti (URU); L 0 – 2 | 5 | did not advance | | | | | |
| Loluama Eti; Valisi Sakalia | Girls' | Cetin/Yurtsever (TUR); L 0 – 2 | 5 | did not advance | | | | | |

== See also ==
- Tuvalu at the 2014 Commonwealth Games
