= Oman at the 2014 Summer Youth Olympics =

- IOC code: OMA
- NOC: Oman Olympic Committee

in Nanjing
- Competitors: 3 in 2 sports
- Medals: Gold 0 Silver 0 Bronze 0 Total 0

Summer Youth Olympics appearances
- 2010; 2014; 2018

Oman competed at the 2014 Summer Youth Olympics, in Nanjing, China from 16 August to 28 August 2014.

== Athletics ==
Oman qualified one athlete.

Qualification Legend: Q=Final A (medal); qB=Final B (non-medal); qC=Final C (non-medal); qD=Final D (non-medal); qE=Final E (non-medal)

Girls
Track & road events

Athlete	Event	Heats		Final	
Athlete	Event	Result	Rank	Result	Rank
Mazoon Al Alawi	100 m	12.61	17 qC	12.50 PB	15

== Beach Volleyball ==
Oman was given a team to compete from the tripartite committee.

Athletes	Event	Preliminary round	Standing	Round of 24	Round of 16	Quarterfinals	Semifinals	Final / BM	Rank
Athletes	Event	Opposition Score	Standing	Opposition Score	Opposition Score	Opposition Score	Opposition Score	Opposition Score	Rank
Samiei Al Hammadi; Ahid Al Sahi	Boys'	Vieyto/Cairus (URU); L 0 – 2	4 Q	Pristauz-Telsnigg/Kratz (AUT); L 0 – 2	did not advance				
Samiei Al Hammadi; Ahid Al Sahi	Boys'	Dmitriyev/Polichshuk (KAZ); L 0 – 2	4 Q	Pristauz-Telsnigg/Kratz (AUT); L 0 – 2	did not advance				
Samiei Al Hammadi; Ahid Al Sahi	Boys'	Siren/Maattanen (FIN); L 0 – 2	4 Q	Pristauz-Telsnigg/Kratz (AUT); L 0 – 2	did not advance				
Samiei Al Hammadi; Ahid Al Sahi	Boys'	Morris/Akande (NGR); W w/o	4 Q	Pristauz-Telsnigg/Kratz (AUT); L 0 – 2	did not advance				
Samiei Al Hammadi; Ahid Al Sahi	Boys'	Fraser/Welcome (VIN); W 2 – 1	4 Q	Pristauz-Telsnigg/Kratz (AUT); L 0 – 2	did not advance				
