= Saint Vincent and the Grenadines at the 2014 Summer Youth Olympics =

- IOC code: VIN
- NOC: St. Vincent and the Grenadines National Olympic Committee

in Nanjing
- Competitors: 4 in 3 sports
- Medals: Gold 0 Silver 0 Bronze 0 Total 0

Summer Youth Olympics appearances
- 2010; 2014; 2018

Saint Vincent and the Grenadines competed at the 2014 Summer Youth Olympics, in Nanjing, China from 16 August to 28 August 2014.

== Athletics ==
Saint Vincent and the Grenadines qualified one athlete.

Qualification Legend: Q=Final A (medal); qB=Final B (non-medal); qC=Final C (non-medal); qD=Final D (non-medal); qE=Final E (non-medal)

Girls
Track & road events

Athlete	Event	Heats		Final	
Athlete	Event	Result	Rank	Result	Rank
Deslorn Lawrence	100 m	12.78 PB	18 qC	12.70 PB	16

== Beach Volleyball ==
St. Vincent and the Grenadines qualified a boys' team by winning the NORCECA ECVA Zone Qualifier.

Athletes	Event	Preliminary round	Standing	Round of 24	Round of 16	Quarterfinals	Semifinals	Final / BM	Rank
Athletes	Event	Opposition Score	Standing	Opposition Score	Opposition Score	Opposition Score	Opposition Score	Opposition Score	Rank
Rodell Fraser; Delshun Welcome	Boys'	Siren/Maattanen (FIN); L 0 – 2	5	did not advance					
Rodell Fraser; Delshun Welcome	Boys'	Samuel Morris/Akande (NGR); W w/o	5	did not advance					
Rodell Fraser; Delshun Welcome	Boys'	Dmitriyev/Polichshuk (KAZ); L 1 – 2	5	did not advance					
Rodell Fraser; Delshun Welcome	Boys'	Vieyto/Cairus (URU); L 0 – 2	5	did not advance					
Rodell Fraser; Delshun Welcome	Boys'	Al Sahi/Al Hammadi (OMA); L 1 – 2	5	did not advance					

== Swimming ==
St. Vincent and the Grenadines qualified one swimmer.

Girls

Athlete	Event	Heat		Semifinal		Final	
Athlete	Event	Time	Rank	Time	Rank	Time	Rank
Adora Lawrence	50 m freestyle	30.67	41	did not advance			
Adora Lawrence	50 m butterfly	34.42	31	did not advance			
