= Triathlon at the 2014 Summer Youth Olympics – Boys' =

Boys' at the II Summer Youth Olympic Games
- Venue: Xuanwu Lake
- Dates: 18 August 2014
- Competitors: 32 from 32 nations

Medalists
1st place, gold medalist(s)		Ben Dijkstra	Great Britain
2nd place, silver medalist(s)		Daniel Hoy	New Zealand
3rd place, bronze medalist(s)		Emil Deleuran Hansen	Denmark

Boys' triathlon was part of the triathlon at the 2014 Summer Youth Olympics programme. The event consisted of 750 metres (0.47 mi) swimming, 20 kilometres (12 mi) cycling, and 5 kilometres (3.1 mi) running. It was held on 18 August 2014 at Xuanwu Lake.

== Results ==
The race began at approximately 9:00 a.m. (UTC+8) on 18 August at Xuanwu Lake.

Rank	Start No.	Triathlete	Swimming	Transit 1	Cycling	Transit 2	Running	Total time	Difference
1st place, gold medalist(s)	10	Ben Dijkstra (GBR)	09:40	00:45	28:37	00:27	15:14	0:54:43	±00:00
2nd place, silver medalist(s)	1	Daniel Hoy (NZL)	09:25	00:39	28:58	00:21	15:20	0:54:43	+00:00
3rd place, bronze medalist(s)	29	Emil Deleuran Hansen (DEN)	09:38	00:42	28:43	00:19	15:27	0:54:49	+00:06
4	20	Peer Sönksen (GER)	09:38	00:44	28:41	00:22	15:32	0:54:57	+00:14
5	23	Javier Martin (CHI)	09:39	00:43	28:40	00:23	16:07	0:55:32	+00:49
6	9	Alberto Gonzalez Garcia (ESP)	09:29	00:42	28:53	00:23	16:10	0:55:37	+00:54
7	16	Giulio Soldati (ITA)	09:20	00:40	29:02	00:25	16:13	0:55:40	+00:57
8	17	Bence Lehmann (HUN)	09:19	00:42	29:01	00:23	16:15	0:55:40	+00:57
9	26	Charles Paquet (CAN)	09:35	00:44	28:43	00:26	16:27	0:55:55	+01:12
10	33	Omri Bahat (ISR)	09:17	00:43	29:04	00:22	16:46	0:56:12	+01:29
11	27	Eduardo Londoño (COL)	09:28	00:49	28:44	00:23	16:52	0:56:16	+01:33
12	24	Seth Rider (USA)	09:30	00:44	28:47	00:25	16:57	0:56:23	+01:40
13	25	Miguel Cassiano (POR)	09:41	00:43	28:39	00:24	17:18	0:56:45	+02:02
14	30	Jack van Stekelenburg (AUS)	09:48	00:38	29:32	00:30	16:39	0:57:07	+02:24
15	22	Jose Gabriel Solorzano (VEN)	09:54	00:44	29:21	00:28	16:52	0:57:19	+02:36
16	8	Lam Michael (HKG)	09:30	00:45	29:25	00:26	17:19	0:57:25	+02:42
17	6	Dmitry Efimov (RUS)	09:56	00:43	29:20	00:33	17:24	0:57:56	+03:13
18	18	Romain Loop (BEL)	09:23	00:42	28:56	00:23	18:40	0:58:04	+03:21
19	28	Tyler Smith (BER)	09:48	00:41	29:32	00:27	17:43	0:58:11	+03:28
20	19	Lee Gyuhyung (KOR)	09:48	00:43	29:30	00:24	18:16	0:58:41	+03:58
21	2	Diego Alejandro Lopez Acosta (MEX)	09:27	00:43	30:26	00:22	18:23	0:59:21	+04:38
22	15	Chong Sheng Cher (SIN)	09:42	00:39	29:40	00:24	19:28	0:59:53	+05:10
23	21	Philip Horwarth (AUT)	09:24	00:41	32:51	00:24	16:43	1:00:03	+05:20
24	4	Bryan Fernando Mendoza Ramos (ESA)	10:29	00:43	31:01	00:25	17:36	1:00:14	+05:31
25	31	Koyo Yamasaki (JPN)	09:36	00:43	31:58	00:21	17:47	1:00:25	+05:42
26	3	Victor Manuel Herrera de la Hoz (CUB)	09:28	00:43	29:56	00:30	20:35	1:01:12	+06:29
27	7	Nathan Le Roux (RSA)	10:32	00:44	31:00	00:25	18:50	1:01:31	+06:48
28	32	Khaled Essam (EGY)	09:46	00:58	31:38	00:38	18:35	1:01:35	+06:58
29	12	Drew Williams (ZIM)	10:46	00:43	30:47	00:25	19:17	1:01:58	+07:15
30	11	Chi Yin-Cheng (TPE)	09:36	00:44	32:18	00:27	19:48	1:02:53	+08:10
31	5	Arman Kydyrtayev (KAZ)	10:56	00:45	34:36	00:25	18:39	1:05:21	+10:38
32	14	Boris Teddy (SOL)	13:14	00:47	32:56	00:38	20:44	1:08:19	+13:36

Note: No one is allotted the number 13.
Note: Romain Loop (BEL), Tyler Smith (BER) and Khaled Essam (EGY) received a 10 seconds penalty, served during run.
