= Cambodia at the 2014 Summer Youth Olympics =

- IOC code: CAM
- NOC: National Olympic Committee of Cambodia

in Nanjing
- Competitors: 3 in 3 sports
- Medals: Gold 0 Silver 0 Bronze 0 Total 0

Summer Youth Olympics appearances
- 2010; 2014; 2018

Cambodia competed at the 2014 Summer Youth Olympics, in Nanjing, China from 16 August to 28 August 2014.

== Athletics ==
Cambodia qualified one athlete.

Qualification Legend: Q=Final A (medal); qB=Final B (non-medal); qC=Final C (non-medal); qD=Final D (non-medal); qE=Final E (non-medal)

Girls
Track & road events

Athlete	Event	Heats		Final	
Athlete	Event	Result	Rank	Result	Rank
Panha Sokha	100 m	13.11 PB	21 qC	13.03 PB	18

== Swimming ==
Cambodia qualified one swimmer.

Boys

Athlete	Event	Heat		Semifinal		Final	
Athlete	Event	Time	Rank	Time	Rank	Time	Rank
Sopha Cheng	50 m freestyle	27.58	45	did not advance			
Sopha Cheng	100 m breaststroke	1:17.64	37	did not advance			

== Wrestling ==
Cambodia was given an invitation to compete from the Tripartite Commission.

Key:

- VT - Victory by Fall.
- PP - Decision by Points - the loser with technical points.
- PO - Decision by Points - the loser without technical points.

Girls

Athlete	Event	Group stage				Final / RM	Rank
Athlete	Event	Opposition Score	Opposition Score	Opposition Score	Rank	Opposition Score	Rank
Srey Mao Dorn	Freestyle -52kg	S Djullibaeva (UZB); L 0 – 4	H Ismail (EGY); L 0 – 4	M Mukaida (JPN); L 0 – 4	4 Q	M Vasquez (ESA); W 4 – 0	7
