= Swimming at the 2014 Summer Youth Olympics – Girls' 400 metre freestyle =

Girls' 400 metre freestyle at the 2014 Summer Youth Olympics
- Venue: Nanjing Olympic Sports Centre
- Dates: 22 August
- Competitors: 33 from 29 nations
- Winning time: 4:11.05

Medalists
gold medal	Hannah Moore	United States
silver medal	Sarisa Suwannachet	Thailand
bronze medal	Kathrin Demler	Germany

The girls' 400 metre freestyle event in swimming at the 2014 Summer Youth Olympics took place on 22 August at the Nanjing Olympic Sports Centre in Nanjing, China.

== Results ==
=== Heats ===
The heats were held at 10:37.

Rank	Heat	Lane	Name	Nationality	Time	Notes
1	4	2	Joanna Evans	Bahamas	4:13.74	Q
2	4	4	Melinda Novoszáth	Hungary	4:14.14	Q
3	4	8	Bruna Primati	Brazil	4:14.38	Q
4	5	5	Kathrin Demler	Germany	4:14.51	Q
5	5	4	Hannah Moore	United States	4:14.54	Q
6	4	3	Sarisa Suwannachet	Thailand	4:14.65	Q
7	3	3	Simona Quadarella	Italy	4:15.40	Q
8	3	2	Claudia Hufnagl	Austria	4:15.95	Q
9	3	4	Viviane Jungblut	Brazil	4:16.14	
10	5	6	Monique Olivier	Luxembourg	4:16.37	
11	5	8	Allyson Macías	Mexico	4:16.49	
12	5	2	Jimena Pérez	Spain	4:16.53	
13	4	7	Nguyễn Thị Ánh Viên	Vietnam	4:16.65	
14	4	6	Daria Mullakaeva	Russia	4:17.68	
15	4	5	Natalia Jaspeado	Mexico	4:17.89	
16	5	3	Patricia Wartenberg	Germany	4:18.93	
17	4	1	Sandra Pallarés	Spain	4:18.98	
18	5	1	Tjaša Pintar	Slovenia	4:22.77	
19	3	5	Tamila Holub	Portugal	4:23.24	
20	3	7	Valerie Gruest	Guatemala	4:24.02	
21	3	8	Angela Chieng	Malaysia	4:26.11	
22	2	6	Daniella van den Berg	Aruba	4:26.14	
23	5	7	Michelle Weber	South Africa	4:26.87	
24	3	1	Edith Mattens	Belgium	4:28.19	
25	3	6	Camille Wishaupt	France	4:28.69	
26	2	5	Rebeca Quinteros	El Salvador	4:29.68	
27	1	4	Hannah Gill	Barbados	4:31.78	
28	1	5	Elena Giovannini	San Marino	4:31.97	
29	2	2	Sunneva Friðriksdóttir	Iceland	4:32.75	
30	2	3	Alina Ene	Romania	4:34.89	
31	2	7	Irene Kyza	Cyprus	4:35.29	
32	2	4	Yael Danieli	Israel	4:35.74	
33	1	3	Chrystelle Doueihy	Lebanon	4:38.30	

=== Final ===
The final was held at 18:00.

Rank	Lane	Name	Nationality	Time	Notes
1st place, gold medalist(s)	2	Hannah Moore	United States	4:11.05	
2nd place, silver medalist(s)	7	Sarisa Suwannachet	Thailand	4:11.23	
3rd place, bronze medalist(s)	6	Kathrin Demler	Germany	4:11.25	
4	5	Melinda Novoszáth	Hungary	4:12.09	
5	4	Joanna Evans	Bahamas	4:12.14	
6	1	Simona Quadarella	Italy	4:15.05	
7	3	Bruna Primati	Brazil	4:15.12	
8	8	Claudia Hufnagl	Austria	4:18.26	
