= Saudi Arabia at the 2014 Summer Youth Olympics =

- IOC code: KSA
- NOC: Saudi Arabian Olympic Committee

in Nanjing
- Competitors: 5 in 4 sports
- Medals: Gold 0 Silver 0 Bronze 0 Total 0

Summer Youth Olympics appearances
- 2010; 2014; 2018

Saudi Arabia competed at the 2014 Summer Youth Olympics, in Nanjing, China from 16 to 28 August 2014.

== Athletics ==
Saudi Arabia qualified two athletes.

Qualification Legend: Q=Final A (medal); qB=Final B (non-medal); qC=Final C (non-medal); qD=Final D (non-medal); qE=Final E (non-medal)

Boys
Track & road events

Athlete	Event	Heats		Final	
Athlete	Event	Result	Rank	Result	Rank
Bader Alamrani	2000 m steeplechase	6:20.66	15 qB	6:18.52	15

Field Events

Athlete	Event	Qualification		Final	
Athlete	Event	Distance	Rank	Distance	Rank
Hussain Al Hizam	Pole vault	4.90	1 Q	4.85	4

== Equestrian ==
Saudi Arabia qualified a rider.

Athlete	Horse	Event	Round 1		Round 2			Total	
Athlete	Horse	Event	Penalties	Rank	Penalties	Total	Rank	Penalties	Rank
Hisham Alsuwayni	Quick Sylver	Individual Jumping	12	22	12	24	21	24	21
Asia; Li Yaofeng (CHN); Sayaka Fujiwara (JPN); Igor Kozubaev (KGZ); Hamad Al Qadi (QAT); Hisham Alsuwayni (KSA)	Uriah; Lasino; Fever; Fernando; Quick Sylver	Team Jumping	12; ~~13~~; ~~13~~; 0; 8	6	~~8~~; 0; ~~EL~~; 4; 4	28	6	28	6

== Taekwondo ==
Saudi Arabia was given a wild card to compete.

Boys

Athlete	Event	Round of 16	Quarterfinals	Semifinals	Final	Rank
Athlete	Event	Opposition Result	Opposition Result	Opposition Result	Opposition Result	Rank
Fahad Alsamih	−48 kg	Bye	S Audibert (FRA); L 5–10	did not advance		5

== Weightlifting ==
Saudi Arabia was given a reallocation spot to compete.

Boys

Athlete	Event	Snatch		Clean & jerk		Total	Rank
Athlete	Event	Result	Rank	Result	Rank	Total	Rank
Sami Alothman	−77 kg	111	7	130	9	241	7
