= Swimming at the 2014 Summer Youth Olympics – Girls' 800 metre freestyle =

Girls' 800 metre freestyle at the 2014 Summer Youth Olympics
- Venue: Nanjing Olympic Sports Centre
- Dates: 19 August
- Competitors: 27 from 24 nations
- Winning time: 8:35.39

Medalists
gold medal	Simona Quadarella	Italy
silver medal	Jimena Pérez	Spain
bronze medal	Joanna Evans	Bahamas

The girls' 800 metre freestyle event in swimming at the 2014 Summer Youth Olympics took place on 19 August at the Nanjing Olympic Sports Centre in Nanjing, China.

This event was a timed-final where each swimmer swam just once. The top 8 seeded swimmers swam in the evening, and the remaining swimmers swam in the morning sessions.

== Results ==
The first round was held on August 19, at 11:02, and the final was held on August 19, at 18:00.

Rank	Heat	Lane	Name	Nationality	Time	Notes
1st place, gold medalist(s)	3	2	Simona Quadarella	Italy	8:35.39	
2nd place, silver medalist(s)	4	4	Jimena Pérez	Spain	8:36.95	
3rd place, bronze medalist(s)	3	1	Joanna Evans	Bahamas	8:39.75	
4	4	8	Nguyễn Thị Ánh Viên	Vietnam	8:41.13	
5	4	1	Allyson Macías	Mexico	8:41.53	
6	4	2	Bruna Primati	Brazil	8:42.80	
7	4	5	Melinda Novoszáth	Hungary	8:44.61	
7	4	3	Patricia Wartenberg	Germany	8:44.61	
9	4	7	Monique Olivier	Luxembourg	8:47.71	
10	3	4	Natalia Jaspeado	Mexico	8:49.76	
11	3	3	Viviane Jungblut	Brazil	8:50.49	
12	3	5	Florbela Machado	Portugal	8:54.50	
13	3	6	Tamila Holub	Portugal	8:57.83	
14	2	5	Valerie Gruest	Guatemala	8:58.78	
15	2	7	Daniella van den Berg	Aruba	8:59.38	
16	4	6	Michelle Weber	South Africa	9:00.16	
17	3	8	Angela Chieng	Malaysia	9:00.61	
18	3	7	Edith Mattens	Belgium	9:01.61	
19	2	3	Jovana Đurić	Serbia	9:02.57	
20	2	6	Teng Yu-wen	Chinese Taipei	9:09.78	
21	2	2	Yael Danieli	Israel	9:15.99	
22	1	4	Hannah Gill	Barbados	9:16.46	
23	1	5	Rebeca Quinteros	El Salvador	9:23.43	
24	2	8	Irene Kyza	Cyprus	9:24.58	
25	1	3	Chrystelle Doueihy	Lebanon	9:26.26	
26	2	4	Alina Ene	Romania	9:27.01	
27	2	1	Sunneva Friðriksdóttir	Iceland	9:28.68	
