= Bahamas at the 2014 Summer Youth Olympics =

- IOC code: BAH
- NOC: Bahamas Olympic Association

in Nanjing
- Competitors: 14 in 4 sports
- Medals Ranked 79th: Gold 0 Silver 0 Bronze 2 Total 2

Summer Youth Olympics appearances
- 2010; 2014; 2018

Bahamas competed at the 2014 Summer Youth Olympics, in Nanjing, China from 16 August to 28 August 2014.

== Medalists ==
Medal	Name	Sport	Event	Date
Bronze	Joanna Evans	Swimming	Girls' 800 m freestyle	19 August
Bronze	Henry Delauze	Athletics	Boys' 400 m	23 August

== Athletics ==
Bahamas qualified 8 athletes.

Qualification Legend: Q=Final A (medal); qB=Final B (non-medal); qC=Final C (non-medal); qD=Final D (non-medal); qE=Final E (non-medal)

Boys
Track & road events

Athlete	Event	Heats		Final	
Athlete	Event	Result	Rank	Result	Rank
Tyler Bowe	100 m	10.78	6 Q	10.96	8
Henry Delauze	400 m	47.44	5 Q	46.91	3rd place, bronze medalist(s)
Tavonte Mott	110 m hurdles	13.86 PB	12 qB	14.09	11

Girls
Track & road events

Athlete	Event	Heats		Final	
Athlete	Event	Result	Rank	Result	Rank
Janae Ambrose	100 m	11.84	8 Q	11.85	5
Shaquania Dorsett	400 m	55.74	11 qB	55.52	14
Dreshannae Rolle	400 m hurdles	1:02.01	12 qB	1:02.34	12

Field events

Athlete	Event	Qualification		Final	
Athlete	Event	Distance	Position	Distance	Position
Serena Brown	Discus throw	38.90	12 qB	38.90	12

== Sailing ==
Bahamas qualified a boat based on its performance at the Byte CII North American & Caribbean Continental Qualifiers.

Athlete	Event	Race											Net Points	Final Rank
Athlete	Event	1	2	3	4	5	6	7	8	9	10	M*	Net Points	Final Rank
Paul de Souza	Boys' Byte CII	11	24	21	(26)	13	14	18	29	Cancelled		156.00	130.00	23

== Swimming ==
Bahamas qualified three swimmers.

Boys

Athlete	Event	Heat		Semifinal		Final	
Athlete	Event	Time	Rank	Time	Rank	Time	Rank
Dustin Tynes	50 m breaststroke	29.35	23	did not advance			
Dustin Tynes	100 m breaststroke	1:02.97	7 Q	1:03.46	14	did not advance	

Girls

Athlete	Event	Heat		Semifinal		Final	
Athlete	Event	Time	Rank	Time	Rank	Time	Rank
Joanna Evans	50 m freestyle	—					
Joanna Evans	100 m freestyle	—					
Joanna Evans	200 m freestyle	—					
Joanna Evans	400 m freestyle	4:13.74	1 Q	—		4:12.14	5
Joanna Evans	800 m freestyle	—				8:39.75	3rd place, bronze medalist(s)
Joanna Evans	200 m individual medley	—					
Laura Morley	50 m breaststroke	33.47	24	did not advance			
Laura Morley	200 m breaststroke	2:36.42	18	—		did not advance	

== Tennis ==
Bahamas qualified two athletes based on the 9 June 2014 ITF World Junior Rankings.

Singles

Athlete	Event	Round of 32	Round of 16	Quarterfinals	Semifinals	Final / BM	Rank
Athlete	Event	Opposition Score	Opposition Score	Opposition Score	Opposition Score	Opposition Score	Rank
Rasheed Carey	Boys' Singles	Rosas (PER); L 1-2; 6-4, 2-6, 3-6	did not advance				17
Justin Roberts	Boys' Singles	Lee (KOR); L 0-2; 2-6, 4-6	did not advance				17

Doubles

Athletes	Event	Round of 32	Round of 16	Quarterfinals	Semifinals	Final / BM	Rank
Athletes	Event	Opposition Score	Opposition Score	Opposition Score	Opposition Score	Opposition Score	Rank
Rasheed Carey (BAH); Justin Roberts (BAH)	Boys' Doubles	—	Khachanov (RUS); Rublev (RUS); L 0-2; 1-6, 3-6	did not advance			9
Simona Heinova (CZE); Rasheed Carey (BAH)	Mixed Doubles	Herazo (COL); Valero (COL); W 2-0; 6-3, 6-2	Kim (KOR); Lee (KOR); W w/o	Teichmann (SUI); Zieliński (POL); L 0-2; 3-6, 3-6	did not advance		5
Renata Zarazua (MEX); Justin Roberts (BAH)	Mixed Doubles	Komardina (RUS); Khachanov (RUS); L 0-2; 4-6, 2-6	did not advance				17
