= Triathlon at the 2014 Summer Youth Olympics – Mixed relay =

Mixed relay at the II Summer Youth Olympic Games
- Venue: Xuanwu Lake
- Dates: 21 August 2014
- Competitors: 64 from 39 nations

Medalists
1st place, gold medalist(s)		Europe 1	Mixed-NOCs
2nd place, silver medalist(s)		Europe 3	Mixed-NOCs
3rd place, bronze medalist(s)		Oceania 1	Mixed-NOCs

4x Mixed Relay Triathlon was part of the triathlon at the 2014 Summer Youth Olympics programme. The event consisted of a relay with each athlete performing 250 metres (0.16 mi) of swimming, 7 kilometres (4.3 mi) of cycling, and 1.7 kilometres (1.1 mi) of running. It was held on 21 August 2014 at Xuanwu Lake. The teams were made based on the results of the boys' and girls' triathlon event held of 17–18 August 2014. Each team had two boys and two girls and were split by continent. A total of 16 teams raced in the event.

== Medalists ==
Gold	Silver	Bronze
Europe 1 Kristin Ranwig (GER); Emil Deleuran Hansen (DEN); Emilie Morier (FRA); Ben Dijkstra (GBR)	Europe 3 Sian Rainsley (GBR); Giulio Soldati (ITA); Carmen Gomez Cortes (ESP); Bence Lehmann (HUN)	Oceania 1 Brittany Dutton (AUS); Jack van Stekelenburg (AUS); Elizabeth Stannard (NZL); Daniel Hoy (NZL)

== Results ==
The race began at approximately 9:00 a.m. (UTC+8) on 21 August at Xuanwu Lake.

Rank	Start No.	Team	Triathletes	Individual Time	Total time	Difference
1st place, gold medalist(s)	1	Europe 1	Kristin Ranwig (GER); Emil Deleuran Hansen (DEN); Emilie Morier (FRA); Ben Dijkstra (GBR)	21:49; 19:25; 21:43; 19:20	1:22:17	±00:00
2nd place, silver medalist(s)	5	Europe 3	Sian Rainsley (GBR); Giulio Soldati (ITA); Carmen Gomez Cortes (ESP); Bence Lehmann (HUN)	21:23; 20:01; 21:23; 19:43	1:22:30	+00:13
3rd place, bronze medalist(s)	3	Oceania 1	Brittany Dutton (AUS); Jack van Stekelenburg (AUS); Elizabeth Stannard (NZL); Daniel Hoy (NZL)	21:00; 19:49; 22:32; 19:49	1:23:10	+00:53
4	6	Europe 4	Alberte Kjær Pedersen (DEN); Miguel Cassiano (POR); Amber Rombaut (BEL); Omri Bahat (ISR)	21:21; 19:50; 22:28; 20:15	1:23:54	+01:37
5	2	Europe 2	Elizaveta Zhizhina (RUS); Alberto Gonzalez Garcia (ESP); Kirsten Nuyes (NED); Peer Sönksen (GER)	21:39; 19:33; 23:12; 19:51	1:24:15	+01:58
6	8	America 2	Emily Wagner (CAN); Eduardo Londoño (COL); Catalina Salazar (CHI); Seth Rider (USA)	21:31; 19:53; 23:56; 20:20	1:25:40	+03:23
7	4	America 1	Katherine Vanesa Clemant Materano (VEN); Javier Martin (CHI); Stephanie Jenks (USA); Charles Paquet (CAN)	23:14; 20:33; 22:08; 19:46	1:25:41	+03:24
8	7	Asia 1	Minami Kubono (JPN); Lam Michael (HKG); Kim Gyuri (KOR); Lee Gyuhyung (KOR)	21:43; 20:06; 23:10; 21:41	1:26:40	+04:23
9	9	Europe 5	Sara Skardelly (AUT); Romain Loop (BEL); Flóra Bicsák (HUN); Dmitry Efimov (RUS)	22:33; 20:42; 23:20; 20:11	1:26:46	+04:29
10	14	World Team 1	Jessica Romero Tinoco (MEX); Victor Manuel Herrera de la Hoz (CUB); Sofiya Pryyma (UKR); Philip Horwarth (AUT)	23:58; 21:07; 23:07; 20:52	1:29:04	+06:47
11	10	America 3	Barbara Santos (BRA); Tyler Smith (BER); Giovanna Michelle Gonzalez Miranda (ESA); Jose Gabriel Solorzano (VEN)	22:51; 21:04; 24:11; 22:11	1:30:17	+08:00
12	12	America 4	Ana Catalina Barahona (CRC); Diego Alejandro Lopez Acosta (MEX); Carolina Velásquez (COL); Bryan Fernando Mendoza Ramos (ESA)	24:05; 20:37; 24:39; 21:07	1:30:28	+08:11
13	11	Asia 2	Feng Jingshuang (CHN); Chong Sheng Cher (SIN); Chia Su Yin Denise (SIN); Koyo Yamasaki (JPN)	23:09; 22:16; 24:25; 21:00	1:30:50	+08:33
14	15	Africa 1	Rehab Hamdy (EGY); Khaled Essam (EGY); Jayme-Sue Vermaas (RSA); Nathan Le Roux (RSA)	25:13; 22:25; 23:47; 21:05	1:32:30	+10:13
15	17	Asia 3	Hung Cheuk Yi Chelsea (HKG); Chi Yin-Cheng (TPE); Victorija Deldio (PHI); Arman Kydyrtayev (KAZ)	23:29; 22:07; 25:15; 22:20	1:33:11	+10:54
16	16	World Team 2	Erica Hawley (BER); Boris Teddy (SOL); Serena Rendell (ZIM); Drew Williams (ZIM)	23:32; 24:05; 25:04; 22:08	1:34:49	+12:32

Note: No one is allotted the number 13.
Note: Teams Oceania 1, World Team 1, World Team 2 and America 3 received a 10 seconds penalty
