= Zimbabwe at the 2014 Summer Youth Olympics =

- IOC code: ZIM
- NOC: Zimbabwe Olympic Committee
- Website: www.zoc.co.zw

in Nanjing
- Competitors: 10 in 5 sports
- Medals: Gold 0 Silver 0 Bronze 0 Total 0

Summer Youth Olympics appearances
- 2010; 2014; 2018; 2026

Zimbabwe competed at the 2014 Summer Youth Olympics, in Nanjing, China from 16 August to 28 August 2014.

== Athletics ==
Zimbabwe qualified three athletes.

Qualification Legend: Q=Final A (medal); qB=Final B (non-medal); qC=Final C (non-medal); qD=Final D (non-medal); qE=Final E (non-medal)

Boys
Track & road events

Athlete	Event	Heats		Final	
Athlete	Event	Result	Rank	Result	Rank
Titus Nyati	3000 m	8:39.67 PB	12 qB	8:37.82 PB	12

Girls
Track & road events

Athlete	Event	Heats		Final	
Athlete	Event	Result	Rank	Result	Rank
Mary Mudyiravanji	1500 m	4:28.53	6 Q	4:28.92	6
Enlitha Ncube	3000 m	9:44.24	11 qB	9:51.06	12

== Equestrian ==
Zimbabwe qualified a rider.

Athlete	Horse	Event	Round 1		Round 2			Total	
Athlete	Horse	Event	Penalties	Rank	Penalties	Total	Rank	Penalties	Rank
Sophie Teede	Caesar	Individual Jumping	8	16	8	16	15	16	15
Africa; Mohamed Hayab (EGY); Lilia Maamar (MAR); Maeva Boyer (SEN); Alexa Stais (RSA); Sophie Teede (ZIM)	White Lady; Figaro; Cornetta; Dominand; Caesar	Team Jumping	0; 4; 8; ~~18~~; ~~8~~	4	0; ~~16~~; 0; ~~12~~; 4	16	4	16	4

== Rowing ==
Zimbabwe qualified two boats based on its performance at the African Qualification Regatta.

Athlete	Event	Heats		Repechage		Semifinals		Final	
Athlete	Event	Time	Rank	Time	Rank	Time	Rank	Time	Rank
Kyle Hind	Boys' Single Sculls	3:38.02	6 R	3:41.41	5 SC/D	3:40.53	4 FD	3:44.22	20
Daniella de Toit	Girls' Single Sculls	3:53.74	2 R	3:50.78	2 SA/B	3:54.72	6 FB	4:01.83	9

Qualification Legend: FA=Final A (medal); FB=Final B (non-medal); FC=Final C (non-medal); FD=Final D (non-medal); SA/B=Semifinals A/B; SC/D=Semifinals C/D; R=Repechage

== Swimming ==
Zimbabwe qualified two swimmers.

Boys

Athlete	Event	Heat		Semifinal		Final	
Athlete	Event	Time	Rank	Time	Rank	Time	Rank
Chad Idensohn	50 m freestyle	23.12	8 Q	23.37	14	did not advance	
Chad Idensohn	100 m freestyle	51.93	23	did not advance			
Chad Idensohn	50 m backstroke	DNS		did not advance			
Chad Idensohn	50 m butterfly	25.02	15 Q	25.10	15	did not advance	

Girls

Athlete	Event	Heat		Semifinal		Final	
Athlete	Event	Time	Rank	Time	Rank	Time	Rank
Robyn Lee	100 m backstroke	1:07.27	32	did not advance			
Robyn Lee	50 m butterfly	28.96	24	did not advance			
Robyn Lee	100 m butterfly	1:05.69	26	did not advance			

== Triathlon ==
Zimbabwe qualified two athletes based on its performance at the 2014 African Youth Olympic Games Qualifier.

Individual

Athlete	Event	Swim (750m)	Trans 1	Bike (20km)	Trans 2	Run (5km)	Total Time	Rank
Drew Williams	Boys	10:47	0:43	30:47	0:25	19:17	1:01:58	29
Serena Rendell	Girls	11:33	0:50	33:46	0:50	23:34	1:10:10	31

Relay

Athlete	Event	Total Times per Athlete (Swim 250m, Bike 6.6km, Run 1.8km)	Total Group Time	Rank
World 2 Erica Hawley (BER); Boris Teddy (SOL); Serena Rendell (ZIM); Drew Williams (ZIM)	Mixed Relay	23:32; 24:05; 25:04; 22:08	1:34:49	16

== See also ==
- Zimbabwe at the 2014 Winter Olympics
