= Cyprus at the 2014 Summer Youth Olympics =

- IOC code: CYP
- NOC: Cyprus Olympic Committee
- Website: olympic.org.cy

in Nanjing
- Competitors: 6 in 4 sports
- Medals Ranked 70th: Gold 0 Silver 1 Bronze 0 Total 1

Summer Youth Olympics appearances
- 2010; 2014; 2018

Cyprus competed at the 2014 Summer Youth Olympics, in Nanjing, China from 16 August to 28 August 2014.

== Medalists ==
Medal	Name	Sport	Event	Date
Silver	Paraskevi Andreou	Athletics	Girls' 100 m	23 August

== Athletics ==
Cyprus qualified two athletes.

Qualification Legend: Q=Final A (medal); qB=Final B (non-medal); qC=Final C (non-medal); qD=Final D (non-medal); qE=Final E (non-medal)

Girls
Track & road events

Athlete	Event	Heats		Final	
Athlete	Event	Result	Rank	Result	Rank
Paraskevi Andreou	100 m	11.65 PB	3 Q	11.71	2nd place, silver medalist(s)
Natalia Christofi	100 m hurdles	13.80	8 Q	13.99	7

== Gymnastics ==
=== Artistic Gymnastics ===
Cyprus qualified one athlete based on its performance at the 2014 European MAG Championships.

Boys

Athlete	Event	Apparatus						Total	Rank
Athlete	Event	F	PH	R	V	PB	HB	Total	Rank
Marios Georgiou	Qualification	12.400	13.600	10.600	14.987	6.000		57.587	40

== Swimming ==
Cyprus qualified two swimmers.

Girls

Athlete	Event	Heat		Semifinal		Final	
Athlete	Event	Time	Rank	Time	Rank	Time	Rank
Margarita Pissaridou	50 m freestyle	27.53	31	did not advance			
Margarita Pissaridou	100 m freestyle	1:00.37	32	did not advance			
Irene Kyza	400 m freestyle	4:35.29	31	—		did not advance	
Irene Kyza	800 m freestyle	—				9:24.58	24

== Tennis ==
Cyprus qualified one athlete based on the 9 June 2014 ITF World Junior Rankings.

Singles

Athlete	Event	Round of 32	Round of 16	Quarterfinals	Semifinals	Final / BM	Rank
Athlete	Event	Opposition Score	Opposition Score	Opposition Score	Opposition Score	Opposition Score	Rank
Petros Chrysochos	Boys' Singles	O Luz (BRA); L 6 – 4, 2 – 6, 1 – 6	did not advance				

Doubles

Athletes	Event	Round of 32	Round of 16	Quarterfinals	Semifinals	Final / BM	Rank
Athletes	Event	Opposition Score	Opposition Score	Opposition Score	Opposition Score	Opposition Score	Rank
Petros Chrysochos (CYP); Nino Serdarusic (CRO)	Boys' Doubles	—	R Matsumura (JPN); J Yamasaki (JPN); L 3 – 6, 4 – 6	did not advance			
Iryna Shymanovich (BLR); Petros Chrysochos (CYP)	Mixed Doubles	D Kim (KOR); D-h Lee (KOR); L 6 – 3, 4 – 6, [11] – [13]	did not advance				
