= Bruna Primati =

Brazilian swimmer (born 1997)

Personal information
- Full name: Bruna Veronez Primati
- Nationality: Brazil
- Born: February 2, 1997 (age 29) São Paulo, São Paulo, Brazil
- Height: 1.73 m (5 ft 8 in)
- Weight: 62 kg (137 lb)

Sport
- Sport: Swimming
- Strokes: Freestyle
Medal record
Women's swimming
Representing Brazil
Pan American Games
Silver medal – second place	2015 Toronto	4x200 m freestyle

Bruna Veronez Primati (born February 2, 1997, in São Paulo) is a Brazilian swimmer.

At the 2014 Summer Youth Olympics in Nanjing, Primati finished 5th in the 4 × 100 metre freestyle relay, 6th in the 800 metre freestyle, 7th in the 400 metre freestyle and 16th in the 200 metre individual medley.

At the 2015 South American Swimming Youth Championships, held in Lima, Peru, Primati won four gold medals in the 200-metre, 400-metre and 800-metre freestyle, and in the 200-metre individual medley.

At the 2015 Pan American Games in Toronto, Ontario, Canada, Primati won a silver medal in the 4 × 200 metre freestyle relay, by participating at heats. She also finished 7th in the Women's 800 metre freestyle.
