= Solomon Islands at the 2014 Summer Youth Olympics =

- IOC code: SOL
- NOC: National Olympic Committee of Solomon Islands

in Nanjing
- Competitors: 3 in 3 sports
- Medals: Gold 0 Silver 0 Bronze 0 Total 0

Summer Youth Olympics appearances
- 2010; 2014; 2018

Solomon Islands competed at the 2014 Summer Youth Olympics, in Nanjing, China from 16 August to 28 August 2014.

== Athletics ==
Solomon Islands qualified one athletes.

Qualification Legend: Q=Final A (medal); qB=Final B (non-medal); qC=Final C (non-medal); qD=Final D (non-medal); qE=Final E (non-medal)

Girls
Track & road events

Athlete	Event	Heats		Final	
Athlete	Event	Result	Rank	Result	Rank
Jenitar Hoka	100 m	13.59	24 qD	13.54	21

== Triathlon ==
Solomon Islands was given a quota to compete by the tripartite committee.

Individual

Athlete	Event	Swim (750m)	Trans 1	Bike (20 km)	Trans 2	Run (5 km)	Total Time	Rank
Teddy Boris	Boys	13:14	0:47	32:56	0:38	20:44	1:08:19	32

Relay

Athlete	Event	Total Times per Athlete (Swim 250m, Bike 6.6 km, Run 1.8 km)	Total Group Time	Rank
World 2 Erica Hawley (BER); Boris Teddy (SOL); Serena Rendell (ZIM); Drew Williams (ZIM)	Mixed Relay	23:32; 24:05; 25:04; 22:08	1:34:49	16

== Weightlifting ==
Solomon Islands was given a quota to compete in a girls' event by the tripartite committee.

Girls

Athlete	Event	Snatch		Clean & jerk		Total	Rank
Athlete	Event	Result	Rank	Result	Rank	Total	Rank
Arina Arina	+63 kg	71	11	85	11	156	11
