= Denmark at the 2014 Summer Youth Olympics =

- IOC code: DEN
- NOC: Denmark Olympic Committee
- Website: www.dif.dk

in Nanjing
- Competitors: 15 in 8 sports
- Flag bearer: Emily Kristine Pedersen
- Medals Ranked 63rd: Gold 0 Silver 1 Bronze 3 Total 4

Summer Youth Olympics appearances
- 2010; 2014; 2018

Denmark competed at the 2014 Summer Youth Olympics, in Nanjing, China from 16 August to 28 August 2014.

== Medalists ==
Medals awarded to participants of mixed-NOC (Combined) teams are represented in italics. These medals are not counted towards the individual NOC medal tally.

Medal	Name	Sport	Event	Date
Gold	Emil Hansen	Triathlon	Mixed Relay	21 August
Silver	Mikkel Honore; Rasmus Salling	Cycling	Boys' Team	22 August
Bronze	Emil Hansen	Triathlon	Boys' Race	18 August
Bronze	Anna Madsen; Pernille Mathiesen	Cycling	Girls' Team	22 August
Bronze	Anne Sofie Kirkegaard	Athletics	Girls' 400 m Hurdles	25 August

== Athletics ==
Qualification Legend: Q=Final A (medal); qB=Final B (non-medal); qC=Final C (non-medal); qD=Final D (non-medal); qE=Final E (non-medal)

Boys
Track & road events

Athlete	Event	Heats		Final	
Athlete	Event	Time	Rank	Time	Rank
Kristoffer Hari	Boys' 100 m	10.82	=7 Q	10.80	=5
Benjamin Lobo Vedel	Boys' 400 m	47.27	2 Q	47.29	5

Girls
Track & road events

Athlete	Event	Heats		Final	
Athlete	Event	Time	Rank	Time	Rank
Anne Sofie Kirkegaard	Girls' 400 m hurdles	59.92	4 Q	58.60 PB	3rd place, bronze medalist(s)

Note: Ranks in the heats-phase refer to the overall rank across all heats.

== Badminton ==
Denmark qualified one athlete based on the 2 May 2014 BWF Junior World Rankings.

Singles

Athlete	Event	Group stage				Quarterfinal	Semifinal	Final / BM	Rank
Athlete	Event	Opposition Score	Opposition Score	Opposition Score	Rank	Opposition Score	Opposition Score	Opposition Score	Rank
Mia Blichfeldt	Girls' Singles	Thilini Promodika Hendahewa (SRI); L 18–21 15–21	Chlorie Cadeau (SEY); W 21–5 21–2	Akane Yamaguchi (JPN); L 12–21 20–22	3	DNQ			=17

Doubles

Athlete	Event	Group stage				Quarterfinal	Semifinal	Final / BM	Rank
Athlete	Event	Opposition Score	Opposition Score	Opposition Score	Rank	Opposition Score	Opposition Score	Opposition Score	Rank
Mia Blichfeldt (DEN); Devins Mananga Nzoussi (CGO)	Mixed Doubles	Guda (AUS)/ Hartawan (INA); L 10–21 7–21	Narongrit (THA)/ Qin (CHN); L 9–21 5–21	Cadeau (SEY)/ Penalver Pereira (ESP); L 16–21 18–21	4	DNQ			=17

== Canoeing ==
Denmark qualified one boat based on its performance at the 2013 World Junior Canoe Sprint and Slalom Championships.

Athlete	Event	Qualification		Repechage		Last 16		Quarterfinal	Semifinal	Final / BM	Rank
Athlete	Event	Time	Rank	Time	Rank	Time	Rank	Opponent Result	Opponent Result	Opponent Result	Rank
Bolette Iversen	Girls' K1 sprint	1:55.101	7 Q	BYE		1:54.119	6 Q	Luca Homonnai (HUN); L 1:55.250–1:43.872	DNQ		8
Bolette Iversen	Girls' K1 slalom	1:32.623	11 R	1:29.397	3 Q	1:31.187	11	DNQ			11

== Cycling ==
Denmark qualified a boys' and girls' team based on its ranking issued by the UCI.

Team

Athletes	Event	Cross-Country Eliminator		Time Trial			BMX		Cross-Country Race			Road Race			Total Pts	Rank
Athletes	Event	Rank	Points	Time	Rank	Points	Rank	Points	Time	Rank	Points	Time	Rank	Points	Total Pts	Rank
Mikkel Honore; Rasmus Salling	Boys' Team	=17	0	5:09.44	1	100	3	130	1:01:23	15	2	1:37:23; DNF	7 –	25; 0	257	2nd place, silver medalist(s)
Anna Madsen; Pernille Mathiesen	Girls' Team	2	80	6:03.31	3	65	=21	0	45:56	3	65	1:13:08; 1:12:36	36; 9	0; 15	225	3rd place, bronze medalist(s)

Mixed Relay

Athletes	Event	Cross-Country Girls' Race	Cross-Country Boys' Race	Boys' Road Race	Girls' Road Race	Total Time	Rank
Anna Madsen; Rasmus Salling; Mikkel Honore; Pernille Mathiesen	Mixed Team Relay	3:25	3:09	5:18	6:13	18:05	6

== Golf ==
Denmark qualified one team of two athletes based on the 8 June 2014 IGF Combined World Amateur Golf Rankings.

Individual

Athlete	Event	Round 1		Round 2			Round 3	Total	
Athlete	Event	Score	Rank	Score	Total	Rank	Score	Score	Rank
John Axelsen	Boys	70 (−2)	=11	74 (+2)	144 (Par)	=13	68 (−4)	212 (−4)	=5
Emily Kristine Pedersen	Girls	75 (+3)	=19	73 (+1)	148 (+4)	=13	67 (−5)	215 (−1)	6

Team

Athletes	Event	Round 1 (Foursome)		Round 2 (Fourball)			Round 3 (Individual Stroke)			Total	
Athletes	Event	Score	Rank	Score	Total	Rank	Boy	Girl	Combined	Score	Rank
John Axelsen; Emily Kristine Pedersen	Mixed	65 (−7)	=6	65 (−7)	130 (−14)	1	73 (+1)	71 (−1)	144 (Par)	274 (−14)	4

== Rowing ==
Denmark qualified one boat based on its performance at the 2013 World Rowing Junior Championships.

Athlete	Event	Heats		Repechage		Semifinals		Final	
Athlete	Event	Time	Rank	Time	Rank	Time	Rank	Time	Rank
Astrid Steensberg	Girls' Single Sculls	3:55.51	2 R	3:57.54	3 SC/D	3:59.73	2 FC	4:02.03	14

Qualification Legend: FA=Final A (medal); FB=Final B (non-medal); FC=Final C (non-medal); FD=Final D (non-medal); SA/B=Semifinals A/B; SC/D=Semifinals C/D; R=Repechage

== Shooting ==
Denmark was given a wild card to compete.

Individual

Athlete	Event	Qualification		Final	
Athlete	Event	Points	Rank	Points	Rank
Christina van Elzelingen	Girls' 10m Air Pistol	369	11	Did not advance	

Team

Athletes	Event	Qualification		Round of 16	Quarterfinals	Semifinals	Final / BM	Rank
Athletes	Event	Points	Rank	Opposition Result	Opposition Result	Opposition Result	Opposition Result	Rank
Christina van Elzelingen (DEN); Christopher Summerell (AUS)	Mixed Team 10m Air Pistol	746	8 Q	Teh (SIN)/ Mohamed (EGY); L 5–10	Did not advance			9

== Triathlon ==
Denmark qualified two athletes based on its performance at the 2014 European Youth Olympic Games Qualifier.

Individual

Athlete	Event	Swim (750m)	Trans 1	Bike (20 km)	Trans 2	Run (5 km)	Total Time	Rank
Emil Hansen	Boys	9:38	0:42	28:43	0:19	15:27	54:49	3rd place, bronze medalist(s)
Alberte Pedersen	Girls	10:46	0:41	32:46	0:41	17:39	1:02:16	10

Relay

Athlete	Event	Total Times per Athlete (Swim 250m, Bike 6.6 km, Run 1.8 km)	Total Group Time	Rank
Europe 1: Kristin Ranwig (GER); Emil Hansen (DEN); Emilie Morier (FRA); Ben Dijkstra (GBR)	Mixed Relay	21:49; 19:25; 21:43; 19:20	1:22:17	1st place, gold medalist(s)
Europe 4: Amber Rombaut (BEL); Miguel Cassiano (POR); Alberte Pedersen (DEN); Omri Bahat (ISR)	Mixed Relay	21:21; 19:50; 22:28; 20:15	1:23:54	4
