= Athletics at the 2014 Summer Youth Olympics – Boys' pole vault =

Athletics – Boys' pole vault at the II Summer Youth Olympic Games
- Venue: Nanjing Olympic Sports Centre
- Date: August 22–25
- Competitors: 16 from 16 nations

Medalists
| 1st place, gold medalist(s) | | Noel Del Cerro | Spain |
| 2nd place, silver medalist(s) | | Vladimir Shcherbakov | Russia |
| 3rd place, bronze medalist(s) | | Muntadher Abdulwahid | Iraq |

The boys’ pole vault competition at the 2014 Summer Youth Olympics was held on 22–25 August 2014 in Nanjing Olympic Sports Center.

== Schedule ==
| Date | Time | Round |
|---|---|---|
| 22 August 2014 | 19:00 | Qualification |
| 25 August 2014 | 19:15 | Final |

== Results ==
=== Qualification ===
First 50% of the athletes from the Qualification round progress to the A Final and the remaining athletes to the B Final.

| Rank | Athlete | 3.90 | 4.10 | 4.30 | 4.45 | 4.60 | 4.70 | 4.80 | 4.90 | Result | Notes | Q |
|---|---|---|---|---|---|---|---|---|---|---|---|---|
| 1 | Hussein Al-Hizam (KSA) | - | - | - | - | o | o | o | o | 4.90 | | FA |
| 1 | Vladimir Shcherbakov (RUS) | - | - | - | o | o | o | o | o | 4.90 | | FA |
| 3 | Muntadher Abdulwahid (IRQ) | - | - | - | - | - | xo | xo | o | 4.90 | | FA |
| 3 | Noel Del Cerro (ESP) | - | - | - | - | - | xo | xo | o | 4.90 | | FA |
| 5 | Bruno Spinelli (BRA) | - | - | - | o | o | o | o | xxx | 4.80 | | FA |
| 5 | Tristan Slater (CAN) | - | - | - | - | o | o | o | xxx | 4.80 | | FA |
| 7 | Yeóryios Triadafíllou (GRE) | - | - | - | o | o | xo | o | xxx | 4.80 | | FA |
| 8 | Vladyslav Malykhin (UKR) | - | - | xo | xo | xo | o | o | xxx | 4.80 | PB | FA |
| 9 | Pierre Cottin (FRA) | - | - | - | - | o | - | xo | xxx | 4.80 | | FB |
| 10 | Declan Carruthers (AUS) | - | - | o | o | o | o | xxo | xxx | 4.80 | | FB |
| 11 | Sander Moldau (EST) | - | - | xxo | o | o | xo | xxx | | 4.70 | PB | FB |
| 12 | Denis Goldovsky (ISR) | - | - | o | o | o | xxx | | | 4.60 | PB | FB |
| 13 | Martín Castañares (URU) | - | xx- | o | o | xxx | | | | 4.45 | PB | FB |
| 14 | Oussama Nasri (TUN) | xo | - | xxo | xxx | | | | | 4.30 | PB | FB |
| | Matteo Cristoforo Capello (ITA) | - | - | - | xxx | | | | | NM | | FB |
| | Josué Gutiérrez (PER) | - | - | xxx | | | | | | NM | | FB |

=== Finals ===
==== Final A ====
| Rank | Final Placing | Athlete | 4.35 | 4.65 | 4.75 | 4.85 | 4.95 | 5.00 | 5.05 | 5.10 | 5.15 | 5.20 | Result | Notes |
|---|---|---|---|---|---|---|---|---|---|---|---|---|---|---|
| 1st place, gold medalist(s) | 1 | Noel Del Cerro (ESP) | - | - | o | - | xo | - | x- | xo | - | xr | 5.10 | PB |
| 2nd place, silver medalist(s) | 2 | Vladimir Shcherbakov (RUS) | - | o | o | - | o | - | o | xxx | | | 5.05 | |
| 3rd place, bronze medalist(s) | 3 | Muntadher Abdulwahid (IRQ) | - | - | - | o | xo | x- | o | xxx | | | 5.05 | PB |
| 4 | 4 | Hussein Al-Hizam (KSA) | - | - | - | o | xxx | | | | | | 4.85 | |
| 4 | 4 | Tristan Slater (CAN) | - | o | o | o | xxx | | | | | | 4.85 | |
| 6 | 6 | Bruno Spinelli (BRA) | - | o | xxo | xo | xxx | | | | | | 4.85 | PB |
| 7 | 7 | Vladyslav Malykhin (UKR) | o | o | xxx | | | | | | | | 4.65 | |
| 8 | 8 | Yeóryios Triadafíllou (GRE) | - | xxo | - | xxx | | | | | | | 4.65 | |

==== Final B ====
| Rank | Final Placing | Athlete | 4.00 | 4.15 | 4.30 | 4.40 | 4.50 | 4.60 | 4.65 | 4.70 | 4.75 | 4.80 | 4.95 | Result | Notes |
|---|---|---|---|---|---|---|---|---|---|---|---|---|---|---|---|
| 1 | 9 | Pierre Cottin (FRA) | - | - | - | - | - | o | - | - | - | xo | xxx | 4.80 | |
| 2 | 10 | Declan Carruthers (AUS) | - | - | - | - | o | o | - | o | xo | xxx | | 4.75 | |
| 3 | 11 | Denis Goldovsky (ISR) | - | - | o | - | xo | - | o | - | xxx | | | 4.65 | PB |
| 4 | 12 | Sander Moldau (EST) | - | - | - | - | xo | xxx | | | | | | 4.50 | |
| 5 | 13 | Josué Gutiérrez (PER) | - | o | xo | - | xxo | xxx | | | | | | 4.50 | |
| 6 | 14 | Martín Castañares (URU) | - | xo | o | xo | xxx | | | | | | | 4.40 | |
| 7 | 15 | Matteo Cristoforo Capello (ITA) | - | o | xo | xxx | | | | | | | | 4.30 | |
| | | Oussama Nasri (TUN) | xxx | | | | | | | | | | | NM | |
