= Swimming at the 2014 Summer Youth Olympics – Girls' 50 metre butterfly =

Girls' 50 metre butterfly at the 2014 Summer Youth Olympics
- Venue: Nanjing Olympic Sports Centre
- Dates: August 19, 2014 (heats & semifinals); August 20, 2014 (final)
- Competitors: 31
- Winning time: 26.26

Medalists
gold medal	Rozaliya Nasretdinova	Russia
silver medal	Svenja Stoffel	Switzerland
bronze medal	Nastja Govejšek	Slovenia

The girls' 50 metre butterfly event in swimming at the 2014 Summer Youth Olympics took place on 19–20 August at the Nanjing Olympic Sports Centre in Nanjing, China.

== Results ==
=== Heats ===
The heats were held at 10:00.

Rank	Heat	Lane	Name	Nationality	Time	Notes
1	2	4	Svenja Stoffel	Switzerland	26.93	Q
2	4	4	Rozaliya Nasretdinova	Russia	26.98	Q
3	3	5	Lucie Svěcená	Czech Republic	27.09	Q
3	4	5	Nastja Govejšek	Slovenia	27.09	Q
5	3	3	Maaike de Waard	Netherlands	27.10	Q
6	4	3	Liliána Szilágyi	Hungary	27.11	Q
7	3	4	Brianna Throssell	Australia	27.14	Q
8	2	5	Elise Olsen	Norway	27.29	Q
8	4	6	Barbora Misendova	Slovakia	27.29	Q
10	2	6	Lena Kreundl	Austria	27.34	Q
11	3	6	Giovanna Diamante	Brazil	27.53	Q
12	3	7	Marina Chan	Singapore	27.54	Q
13	2	3	Kim Busch	Netherlands	27.61	Q
14	4	1	Danika Huizinga	Canada	27.90	Q
15	4	8	Dorian Taylor	Dominican Republic	28.06	Q
16	2	7	Nida Eliz Üstündağ	Turkey	28.09	Q
17	4	7	Claudia Tarza	Italy	28.10	
18	4	2	Sara Vanleynseele	Belgium	28.11	
19	3	1	Park Jin-young	South Korea	28.24	
20	3	2	Charlotte Atkinson	Great Britain	28.41	
21	2	1	Jurina Shiga	Japan	28.47	
22	2	2	Yap Siew Hui	Malaysia	28.50	
23	3	8	Carmen Marquez Orellana	El Salvador	28.62	
24	1	3	Robyn Lee	Zimbabwe	28.96	
25	1	4	Elodie Cheong	Mauritius	29.07	
26	1	6	Jannah Sonnenschein	Mozambique	29.35	
27	1	2	Ophelia Swayne	Ghana	29.51	
28	1	5	Maria Jose Ribera	Bolivia	29.53	
29	1	7	Amarah Phillip	British Virgin Islands	31.05	
30	1	1	Merjen Saryýewa	Turkmenistan	31.49	
31	1	8	Adora Lawrence	Saint Vincent and the Grenadines	34.42	
	2	8	Bobbi Gichard	New Zealand	DNS	

=== Semifinals ===
The semifinals were held at 18:12.

Rank	Heat	Lane	Name	Nationality	Time	Notes
1	1	4	Rozaliya Nasretdinova	Russia	26.55	Q
2	1	5	Nastja Govejšek	Slovenia	26.77	Q
3	2	6	Brianna Throssell	Australia	26.82	Q
4	2	4	Svenja Stoffel	Switzerland	26.89	Q
5	1	6	Elise Olsen	Norway	27.01	Q
6	1	3	Liliána Szilágyi	Hungary	27.04	Q
7	2	7	Giovanna Diamante	Brazil	27.05	Q
8	2	2	Barbora Misendova	Slovakia	27.17	Q
9	2	5	Lucie Svěcená	Czech Republic	27.18	
9	2	3	Maaike de Waard	Netherlands	27.18	
11	1	2	Lena Kreundl	Austria	27.21	
12	1	7	Marina Chan	Singapore	27.59	
13	2	1	Kim Busch	Netherlands	27.65	
14	1	8	Nida Eliz Üstündağ	Turkey	27.80	
15	2	8	Dorian Taylor	Dominican Republic	27.94	
16	1	1	Danika Huizinga	Canada	28.17	

=== Final ===
The final was held at 18:24.

Rank	Lane	Name	Nationality	Time	Notes
1st place, gold medalist(s)	4	Rozaliya Nasretdinova	Russia	26.26	WJR
2nd place, silver medalist(s)	6	Svenja Stoffel	Switzerland	26.62	
3rd place, bronze medalist(s)	5	Nastja Govejšek	Slovenia	26.70	
4	3	Brianna Throssell	Australia	26.72	
5	7	Liliána Szilágyi	Hungary	26.82	
6	2	Elise Olsen	Norway	26.85	
7	8	Barbora Misendova	Slovakia	26.95	
8	1	Giovanna Diamante	Brazil	27.40	
