= Sara Raposeiro =

Portuguese gymnast (born 1999)

- Full name: Sara Sequeira Raposeiro
- Born: 9 March 1999 (age 27)
- Height: 155 cm (5 ft 1 in)

Gymnastics career
- Discipline: Women's artistic gymnastics
- Country represented: Portugal; (2013–2015)

Sara Sequeira Raposeiro (born 9 March 1999) is a Portuguese former artistic gymnast. She represented Portugal at the 2014 Summer Youth Olympics and at the 2015 World Artistic Gymnastics Championships.

== Gymnastics career ==
=== Junior ===
Raposeiro made her international debut at the 2013 European Youth Summer Olympic Festival in Utrecht, Netherlands, and only competed on the vault and uneven bars. She did not advance into either event final. In March 2014, she won the all-around title at the Gymsport Internacional held in Sangalhos. She then competed in the all-around at the 2014 European Championships and finished 39th in the qualifications with a total score of 48.066. Additionally, she helped Portugal finish 20th in the team competition. With this result, she qualified to represent Portugal at the 2014 Summer Youth Olympics in Nanjing, China. She finished 27th in the all-around during the qualification round with a total score of 46.275 and did not advance into any of the finals. Her best apparatus result was on the floor exercise, where she placed 12th.

=== Senior ===
Raposeiro became age-eligible for senior international competitions in 2015. She placed fourth in the all-around at the 2015 Portuguese Championships. She competed on the vault and the uneven bars at the 2015 Anadia World Challenge Cup, but she did not advance into either apparatus final. She was then selected to compete at the 2015 World Championships in Glasgow and finished 165th in the all-around qualification round with a total score of 45.632. This was the final competition of her gymnastics career.
