= Dominican Republic at the 2014 Summer Youth Olympics =

- IOC code: DOM
- NOC: Comité Olímpico Dominicano

in Nanjing
- Competitors: 10 in 8 sports
- Medals Ranked 70th: Gold 0 Silver 1 Bronze 0 Total 1

Summer Youth Olympics appearances
- 2010; 2014; 2018; 2026

Dominican Republic competed at the 2014 Summer Youth Olympics, in Nanjing, China from 16 August to 28 August 2014.

== Medalists ==
Medals awarded to participants of mixed-NOC (Combined) teams are represented in italics. These medals are not counted towards the individual NOC medal tally.

Medal	Name	Sport	Event	Date
Silver	Juan Solano	Boxing	Boys' -69 kg	27 August
Bronze	María Brugal	Equestrian	Team Jumping	20 August

== Athletics ==
Dominican Republic qualified two athletes.

Qualification Legend: Q=Final A (medal); qB=Final B (non-medal); qC=Final C (non-medal); qD=Final D (non-medal); qE=Final E (non-medal)

Boys
Track & road events

Athlete	Event	Heats		Final	
Athlete	Event	Result	Rank	Result	Rank
Erick Sanchez Guzman	200 m	21.72 PB	11 qB	21.89	9
Juan Nunez de la Rosa	400 m hurdles	52.72 PB	7 Q	52.70 PB	6

== Boxing ==
Dominican Republic qualified one boxer based on its performance at the 2014 AIBA Youth World Championships

Boys

Athlete	Event	Preliminaries	Semifinals	Final / RM	Rank
Athlete	Event	Opposition Result	Opposition Result	Opposition Result	Rank
Juan Ramón Solano	-69 kg	Prtenjača (CRO); W 3-0	Lizzi (ITA); W 3-0	Melikuziev (UZB); L 0-3	2nd place, silver medalist(s)

== Equestrian ==
Dominican Republic qualified a rider.

Athlete	Horse	Event	Round 1		Round 2			Total	
Athlete	Horse	Event	Penalties	Rank	Penalties	Total	Rank	Penalties	Rank
María Brugal	Famoso	Individual Jumping	0	1			22	14	14
North America; Polly Serpell (CAY); María Brugal (DOM); Macarena Chiriboga Granja (ECU); Sabrina Rivera Meza (ESA); Stefanie Brand (GUA)	Giorgio Zan; Famoso; Brigand; Con-Zero; Chica	Team Jumping	4; 4; ~~8~~; ~~8~~; 0	3	0; ~~8~~; 0; 0; ~~4~~	8	3	8	3rd place, bronze medalist(s)

== Judo ==
Dominican Republic qualified one athlete based on its performance at the 2013 Cadet World Judo Championships.

Individual

Athlete	Event	Quarterfinals	Semifinals	Rep 1	Rep 2	Final / BM	Rank
Athlete	Event	Opposition Result	Opposition Result	Opposition Result	Opposition Result	Opposition Result	Rank
Estefania Soriano	Girls' -44 kg	Turcheva (RUS); L 000-001	Did not advance	Bye	Saiyn (KAZ); W 100-000	Yamauchi (JPN); L 000-010	5

Team

Athletes	Event	Round of 16	Quarterfinals	Semifinals	Final	Rank
Athletes	Event	Opposition Result	Opposition Result	Opposition Result	Opposition Result	Rank
Team Chochishvili; Stefania Adelina Dobre (ROU); Fatim Fofana (CIV); Bogdan Iadov (UKR); Louis Krieber-Gagnon (CAN); Liu Xiaoyu (CHN); Yu-Hsuan Lo (TPE); Marton Sarecz (HUN); Estefania Soriano (DOM)	Mixed Team	Team Kerr (MIX); L 3 – 4	Did not advance			9

== Sailing ==
Dominican Republic qualified one boat based on its performance at the 2013 World Byte CII Championships.

Athlete	Event	Race											Net Points	Final Rank
Athlete	Event	1	2	3	4	5	6	7	8	9	10	M*	Net Points	Final Rank
Celeste Lugtmeijer	Girls' Byte CII	12	2	6	6	27	1	(31); DNF	15	Cancelled		100.00	69.00	7

== Swimming ==
Dominican Republic qualified two swimmers.

Boys

Athlete	Event	Heat		Semifinal		Final	
Athlete	Event	Time	Rank	Time	Rank	Time	Rank
Josue Dominguez Ramos	50 m breaststroke	28.99	14 Q	29.12	15	Did not advance	

Girls

Athlete	Event	Heat		Semifinal		Final	
Athlete	Event	Time	Rank	Time	Rank	Time	Rank
Maria McMenemy Taylor	50 m butterfly	28.06	15 Q	27.94	15	Did not advance	

== Weightlifting ==
Dominican Republic qualified 1 quota in the boys' events based on the team ranking after the 2014 Weightlifting Youth Pan American Championships.

Boys

Athlete	Event	Snatch		Clean & jerk		Total	Rank
Athlete	Event	Result	Rank	Result	Rank	Total	Rank
Luis Castillo Martinez	−69 kg	110	8	132	9	242	9

== Wrestling ==
Dominican Republic qualified one athlete based on its performance at the 2014 Pan American Cadet Championships.

Key:
- VT - Victory by Fall.
- PP - Decision by Points - the loser with technical points.
- PO - Decision by Points - the loser without technical points.

Boys

Athlete	Event	Group stage				Final / RM	Rank
Athlete	Event	Opposition Score	Opposition Score	Opposition Score	Rank	Opposition Score	Rank
Nelson de Los Santos	Greco-Roman -58kg	Mikaelyan (ARM); L 0-4 ^{ST}	Nasr (TUN); L 0-4 ^{VT}	Destribats (ARG); L 0-4 ^{VT}	4 Q	Downes (NZL)	
