= Swimming at the 2014 Summer Youth Olympics – Girls' 50 metre freestyle =

Swimming event at the 2014 Summer Youth Olympics in Nanjing, China

Girls' 50 metre freestyle at the 2014 Summer Youth Olympics
- Venue: Nanjing Olympic Sports Centre
- Dates: 21 August (heats, semifinals); 22 August (final)
- Competitors: 49 from 44 nations
- Winning time: 24.88

Medalists
| gold medal | Rozaliya Nasretdinova | Russia |
| silver medal | Ami Matsuo | Australia |
| bronze medal | Daria S. Ustinova | Russia |

The girls' 50 metre freestyle event in swimming at the 2014 Summer Youth Olympics took place on 21–22 August at the Nanjing Olympic Sports Centre in Nanjing, China.

== Results ==
=== Heats ===
The heats were held at 10:00.

| Rank | Heat | Lane | Name | Nationality | Time | Notes |
|---|---|---|---|---|---|---|
| 1 | 7 | 4 | Rozaliya Nasretdinova | Russia | 25.00 | Q |
| 2 | 6 | 5 | Ami Matsuo | Australia | 25.50 | Q |
| 3 | 7 | 3 | Qiu Yuhan | China | 25.57 | Q |
| 4 | 5 | 6 | Daria S. Ustinova | Russia | 25.80 | Q |
| 5 | 6 | 4 | Siobhán Haughey | Hong Kong | 25.87 | Q |
| 6 | 7 | 5 | Julie Meynen | Luxembourg | 26.01 | Q |
| 7 | 6 | 3 | Gabrielle Fa'amausili | New Zealand | 26.12 | Q |
| 8 | 5 | 4 | Nastja Govejšek | Slovenia | 26.18 | Q |
| 9 | 5 | 8 | Barbora Mišendová | Slovakia | 26.25 | Q |
| 10 | 7 | 7 | Marina Chan | Singapore | 26.29 | Q |
| 11 | 7 | 6 | Lena Kreundl | Austria | 26.31 | Q |
| 12 | 5 | 3 | Kim Busch | Netherlands | 26.32 | Q |
| 13 | 7 | 8 | Tjaša Pintar | Slovenia | 26.33 | Q |
| 14 | 7 | 2 | İlknur Çakıcı | Turkey | 26.37 | Q |
| 15 | 5 | 7 | Clara Smiddy | United States | 26.42 | Q |
| 16 | 7 | 1 | Rachele Ceracchi | Italy | 26.46 | Q |
| 17 | 5 | 2 | Zohar Shikler | Israel | 26.61 | |
| 18 | 6 | 6 | Nikola Petryka | Poland | 26.70 | |
| 19 | 4 | 4 | Emma Terebo | France | 26.73 | |
| 20 | 6 | 7 | Ella Bond | Australia | 26.76 | |
| 21 | 6 | 1 | Dominika Sztandera | Poland | 26.78 | |
| 21 | 6 | 8 | Yekaterina Russova | Kazakhstan | 26.78 | |
| 23 | 3 | 5 | Machiko Raheem | Sri Lanka | 26.79 | |
| 24 | 4 | 3 | Elisbet Gámez | Cuba | 26.85 | |
| 25 | 6 | 2 | Amelia Maughan | Great Britain | 26.89 | |
| 26 | 4 | 5 | Elisavet Panti | Greece | 26.99 | |
| 26 | 4 | 8 | Ema Sarar | Croatia | 26.99 | |
| 28 | 4 | 2 | Kelsey Wog | Canada | 27.07 | |
| 29 | 5 | 1 | Mandy Feldbinder | Germany | 27.08 | |
| 30 | 3 | 4 | Johnnya Ferdinand | Trinidad and Tobago | 27.31 | |
| 31 | 4 | 6 | Margarita Pissaridou | Cyprus | 27.53 | |
| 32 | 4 | 7 | Maria Ribera | Bolivia | 27.55 | |
| 33 | 4 | 1 | Zabrina Holder | Barbados | 27.65 | |
| 34 | 3 | 3 | Lydia Musleh | Jordan | 27.66 | |
| 35 | 3 | 2 | Joyce Tafatatha | Malawi | 27.73 | |
| 36 | 3 | 7 | Britany van Lange | Guyana | 28.43 | |
| 37 | 3 | 6 | Ophelia Swayne | Ghana | 28.76 | |
| 38 | 3 | 8 | Amarah Phillip | British Virgin Islands | 29.28 | |
| 39 | 2 | 4 | Merjen Saryýewa | Turkmenistan | 29.50 | |
| 40 | 3 | 1 | Mia Benjamin | Grenada | 29.71 | |
| 41 | 2 | 3 | Adora Lawrence | Saint Vincent and the Grenadines | 30.67 | |
| 42 | 2 | 5 | Karina Klimyk | Tajikistan | 31.94 | |
| 43 | 1 | 3 | Sabrina Kassam | Tanzania | 32.54 | |
| 44 | 2 | 6 | Shayma Farhan | Palestine | 32.75 | |
| 45 | 2 | 2 | Aishath Sajina | Maldives | 32.90 | |
| 46 | 1 | 4 | Prylain Manuel | Federated States of Micronesia | 33.97 | |
| 47 | 2 | 7 | Calina Panuve | Tonga | 35.15 | |
| 48 | 1 | 5 | Charmel Sogbadji | Benin | 45.76 | |
| | 5 | 5 | Maaike de Waard | Netherlands | DNS | |

=== Semifinals ===
The semifinals were held at 18:27.

| Rank | Heat | Lane | Name | Nationality | Time | Notes |
|---|---|---|---|---|---|---|
| 1 | 2 | 4 | Rozaliya Nasretdinova | Russia | 25.20 | Q |
| 2 | 1 | 4 | Ami Matsuo | Australia | 25.40 | Q |
| 3 | 1 | 5 | Daria S. Ustinova | Russia | 25.42 | Q |
| 4 | 1 | 3 | Julie Meynen | Luxembourg | 25.60 | Q |
| 5 | 2 | 5 | Qiu Yuhan | China | 25.61 | Q |
| 6 | 2 | 3 | Siobhán Haughey | Hong Kong | 25.69 | Q |
| 7 | 2 | 6 | Nastja Govejšek | Slovenia | 25.90 | Q |
| 8 | 1 | 7 | Tjaša Pintar | Slovenia | 25.94 | Q |
| 9 | 1 | 2 | Lena Kreundl | Austria | 25.96 | |
| 10 | 2 | 7 | Kim Busch | Netherlands | 26.00 | |
| 11 | 1 | 6 | Barbora Mišendová | Slovakia | 26.05 | |
| 12 | 1 | 8 | Zohar Shikler | Israel | 26.14 | |
| 13 | 2 | 2 | Marina Chan | Singapore | 26.18 | |
| 14 | 2 | 8 | Rachele Ceracchi | Italy | 26.20 | |
| 15 | 2 | 1 | İlknur Çakıcı | Turkey | 26.26 | |
| 16 | 1 | 1 | Clara Smiddy | United States | 26.39 | |

=== Final ===
The final was held at 18:00.

| Rank | Lane | Name | Nationality | Time | Notes |
|---|---|---|---|---|---|
| 1st place, gold medalist(s) | 4 | Rozaliya Nasretdinova | Russia | 24.88 | WJR |
| 2nd place, silver medalist(s) | 5 | Ami Matsuo | Australia | 25.27 | |
| 3rd place, bronze medalist(s) | 3 | Daria S. Ustinova | Russia | 25.56 | |
| 4 | 6 | Julie Meynen | Luxembourg | 25.57 | |
| 5 | 7 | Siobhán Haughey | Hong Kong | 25.61 | |
| 6 | 8 | Tjaša Pintar | Slovenia | 25.82 | |
| 7 | 1 | Nastja Govejšek | Slovenia | 25.95 | |
| 8 | 2 | Qiu Yuhan | China | 26.68 | |
