= Israel at the 2014 Summer Youth Olympics =

- IOC code: ISR
- NOC: Olympic Committee of Israel
- Website: www.olympicsil.co.il (in Hebrew and English)

in Nanjing
- Competitors: 14 in 8 sports
- Flag bearer: Yoav Omer
- Medals: Gold 0 Silver 0 Bronze 0 Total 0

Summer Youth Olympics appearances (overview)
- 2010; 2014; 2018; 2026

Israel competed at the 2014 Summer Youth Olympics, in Nanjing, China from 16 August to 28 August 2014.

== Medalists ==
Medal	Name	Sport	Event	Date
Bronze	Idan Vardi	Judo	Mixed teams (part of the mixed-NOC team Xian)	21 Aug

== Archery ==
Israel qualified a female archer from its performance at the 2013 World Archery Youth Championships.

Individual

Athlete	Event	Ranking round		Round of 32	Round of 16	Quarterfinals	Semifinals	Final / BM	Rank
Athlete	Event	Score	Seed	Opposition Score	Opposition Score	Opposition Score	Opposition Score	Opposition Score	Rank
Maya Rayskin	Girls' Individual	620	21	Boda (IND); L 3-7	Did not advance				17

Team

Athletes	Event	Ranking round		Round of 32	Round of 16	Quarterfinals	Semifinals	Final / BM	Rank
Athletes	Event	Score	Seed	Opposition Score	Opposition Score	Opposition Score	Opposition Score	Opposition Score	Rank
Maya Rayskin (ISR); Mete Gazoz (TUR)	Mixed Team	1287	11	Zyzanska (POL); Komar (UKR); W 5-4	Kazanskaya (BLR); Yun-chien (TPE); L 4-5	Did not advance			9

== Athletics ==
Israel qualified two athletes.

Qualification Legend: Q=Final A (medal); qB=Final B (non-medal);

Boys
Field Events

Athlete	Event	Qualification		Final	
Athlete	Event	Distance	Rank	Distance	Rank
Gal Sinai	Triple jump	15.35m	5 Q	NM	
Dennis Goldovsky	Pole vault	4.60m	12 qB	4.65m	11

== Gymnastics ==
=== Artistic Gymnastics ===
Israel qualified one athlete based on its performance at the 2014 European MAG Championships.

Boys

Athlete	Event	Apparatus						Total	Rank
Athlete	Event	F	PH	R	V	PB	HB	Total	Rank
Artem Dolgopyat	Qualification	13.975 Q	13.100	12.600	14.450 Q	12.500	12.900	79.525	10 Q
Artem Dolgopyat	All-Around	13.850	13.250	12.200	14.550	11.700	12.850	78.400	10
Artem Dolgopyat	Floor Exercise	—N/a						13.266	8
Artem Dolgopyat	Vault	—N/a						13.974	5

=== Rhythmic Gymnastics ===
Israel qualified one athlete based on its performance at the 2014 Rhythmic Gymnastics Grand Prix in Moscow.

Individual

Athlete	Event	Qualification						Final					
Athlete	Event	Hoop	Ball	Clubs	Ribbon	Total	Rank	Hoop	Ball	Clubs	Ribbon	Total	Rank
Linoy Ashram	Individual	14.050	13.925	13.875	13.725	55.575	4 Q	14.200	14.050	13.900	13.475	55.625	5

== Judo ==
Israel qualified one athlete based on its performance at the 2013 Cadet World Judo Championships.

Individual

Athlete	Event	Round of 32	Round of 16	Quarterfinals	Semifinals	Repechage				Final / BM	Rank
Athlete	Event	Round of 32	Round of 16	Quarterfinals	Semifinals	Round of 16	Round of 8	Quarterfinals	Semifinals	Final / BM	Rank
Athlete	Event	Opposition Result	Opposition Result	Opposition Result	Opposition Result	Opposition Result	Opposition Result	Opposition Result	Opposition Result	Opposition Result	Rank
Idan Vardi	Boys' -81 kg	Penning (LUX) W 111-000	Kirakozashvili (GEO) L 100-000	Did not advance		Ndiaye (SEN) L 100-000	Did not advance				17

Team

Athletes	Event	Round of 16		Quarterfinals		Semifinals		Final		Rank
Athletes	Event	Personal	Team	Personal	Team	Personal	Team	Personal	Team	Rank
Athletes	Event	Opposition Result	Opposition Result	Opposition Result	Opposition Result	Opposition Result	Opposition Result	Opposition Result	Opposition Result	Rank
Xian; Hifumi Abe (JPN); Chiara Carminucci (ITA); Naomi de Brune (AUS); Jolan Florimont (FRA); Brillith Gamarra (PER); Felix Penning (LUX); Marusa Stangar (SLO); Idan Vardi (ISR)	Mixed Team	Dashkov (KGZ) W 100-0; Walkover	Tani; W 7–0	Schonefeldt (GER) L 101-000	Berghmans; W 4–3	Bye	Rouge; L 3–4	Did not advance		3rd place, bronze medalist(s)

== Sailing ==
Israel qualified one boat based on its performance at the 2013 World Techno 293 Championships. Later Israel qualified one more boat based on its performance at the Techno 293 European Continental Qualifiers.

Athlete	Event	Race											Score	Rank
Athlete	Event	1	2	3	4	5	6	7	8	9	10	M*	Score	Rank
Yoav Omer	Boys' Techno 293	5	2	(13)	4	6	5	5	Cancelled				27 (40)	5
Noy Drihan	Girls' Techno 293	9	10	5	13	8	(15)	6	Cancelled				51 (66)	8

== Swimming ==
Israel qualified four swimmers.

Boys

Athlete	Event	Heat		Final	
Athlete	Event	Time	Rank	Time	Rank
Ido Haber	200 m freestyle	1:50.84	6 Q	1:50.41	6
Ido Haber	400 m freestyle	3:53.45	5 Q	3:53.55	5
Ido Haber	800 m freestyle	—N/a		8:09.92	9
Marc Hinawi	400 m freestyle	4:01.38	22	Did not advance	
Marc Hinawi	800 m freestyle	—N/a		8:28.67	20

Girls

Athlete	Event	Heat		Semifinal		Final	
Athlete	Event	Time	Rank	Time	Rank	Time	Rank
Zohar-Hen Shikler	50 m freestyle	26.61	17 Q	26.14	12	Did not advance	
Zohar-Hen Shikler	100 m freestyle	58.09	23	Did not advance			
Yael Danieli	400 m freestyle	4:35.74	32	—N/a		Did not advance	
Yael Danieli	800 m freestyle	—N/a				9:15.99	21

== Table Tennis ==
Israel qualified one athlete based on its performance at the European Qualification Event.

Singles

Athlete	Event	Group Stage		Round of 16	Quarterfinals	Semifinals	Final / BM	Rank
Athlete	Event	Opposition Score	Rank	Opposition Score	Opposition Score	Opposition Score	Opposition Score	Rank
Nicole Trosman	Girls	Bui (AUS); W 3-0	2 Q	Doo (HKG); L 0-4	Did not advance			9
Nicole Trosman	Girls	Chiu (TPE); W 3-2	2 Q	Doo (HKG); L 0-4	Did not advance			9
Nicole Trosman	Girls	Saad (EGY); L 2-3	2 Q	Doo (HKG); L 0-4	Did not advance			9

Team

Athletes	Event	Group Stage		Round of 16	Quarterfinals	Semifinals	Final / BM	Rank
Athletes	Event	Opposition Score	Rank	Opposition Score	Opposition Score	Opposition Score	Opposition Score	Rank
Europe 2 Nicole Trosman (ISR); Elias Ranefur (SWE)	Mixed	Africa 2 W walkover	2 Q	Latin America 1 W 2-1	Japan; L 0-2	Did not advance		5
Europe 2 Nicole Trosman (ISR); Elias Ranefur (SWE)	Mixed	United States; W 2-1	2 Q	Latin America 1 W 2-1	Japan; L 0-2	Did not advance		5
Europe 2 Nicole Trosman (ISR); Elias Ranefur (SWE)	Mixed	Chinese Taipei; L 0-3	2 Q	Latin America 1 W 2-1	Japan; L 0-2	Did not advance		5

Qualification Legend: Q=Main Bracket (medal); qB=Consolation Bracket (non-medal)

== Triathlon ==
Israel qualified one athlete based on its performance at the 2014 European Youth Olympic Games Qualifier.

Individual

Athlete	Event	Swim (750m)	Trans 1	Bike (20 km)	Trans 2	Run (5 km)	Total Time	Rank
Omri Bahat	Boys	0:09:17	0:00:43	0:29:04	0:00:22	0:16:46	0:56:12	10

Relay

Athlete	Event	Total Times per Athlete (Swim 250m, Bike 6.6 km, Run 1.8 km)	Total Group Time	Rank
Europe 4 Alberte Pedersen (DEN); Miguel Cassiano (POR); Amber Rombaut (BEL); Omri Bahat (ISR)	Mixed Team Relay	0:21:21; 0:19:50; 0:22:28; 0:20:15	01:23:54	4
