= El Salvador at the 2014 Summer Youth Olympics =

- IOC code: ESA
- NOC: Comité Olímpico de El Salvador

in Nanjing
- Competitors: 8 in 5 sports
- Medals Ranked 70th: Gold 0 Silver 1 Bronze 0 Total 1

Summer Youth Olympics appearances
- 2010; 2014; 2018

El Salvador competed at the 2014 Summer Youth Olympics, in Nanjing, China from 16 August to 28 August 2014.

== Medalists ==
Medals awarded to participants of mixed-NOC (Combined) teams are represented in italics. These medals are not counted towards the individual NOC medal tally.

Medal	Name	Sport	Event	Date
Silver	Marcelo Acosta	Swimming	Boys' 400 m freestyle	17 August
Bronze	Sabrina Rivera Meza	Equestrian	Team Jumping	20 August

== Equestrian ==
El Salvador qualified a rider.

Athlete	Horse	Event	Round 1		Round 2			Total		Jump-Off		Rank
Athlete	Horse	Event	Penalties	Rank	Penalties	Total	Rank	Penalties	Rank	Penalties	Time	Rank
Sabrina Rivera Meza	Con-Zero	Individual Jumping	0	1	0	0	1	0	=1	8	40.15	4
North America; Polly Serpell (CAY); María Brugal (DOM); Macarena Chiriboga Granja (ECU); Sabrina Rivera Meza (ESA); Stefanie Brand (GUA)	Giorgio Zan; Famoso; Brigand; Con-Zero; Chica	Team Jumping	4; 4; ~~8~~; ~~8~~; 0	3	0; ~~8~~; 0; 0; ~~4~~	8	3	8	3rd place, bronze medalist(s)	—N/a		

== Rowing ==
El Salvador was given a boat to compete by the tripartite committee.

Athlete	Event	Heats		Repechage		Semifinals		Final	
Athlete	Event	Time	Rank	Time	Rank	Time	Rank	Time	Rank
Juan Carlos Elias	Boys' Single Sculls	3:50.49	6 R	3:45.04	5 SC/D	3:45.69	5 FD	3:50.31	23

Qualification Legend: FA=Final A (medal); FB=Final B (non-medal); FC=Final C (non-medal); FD=Final D (non-medal); SA/B=Semifinals A/B; SC/D=Semifinals C/D; R=Repechage

== Swimming ==
El Salvador qualified three swimmers.

Boys

Athlete	Event	Heat		Final	
Athlete	Event	Time	Rank	Time	Rank
Marcelo Acosta	200 m freestyle	1:52.50	17	did not advance	
Marcelo Acosta	400 m freestyle	3:53.14	3 Q	3:51.32	2nd place, silver medalist(s)
Marcelo Acosta	800 m freestyle	—N/a		8:02.69	5

Girls

Athlete	Event	Heat		Semifinal		Final	
Athlete	Event	Time	Rank	Time	Rank	Time	Rank
Rebeca Quinteros	400 m freestyle	4:29.68	26	—N/a		did not advance	
Rebeca Quinteros	800 m freestyle	—N/a				9:23.43	23
Carmen Marquez Orellana	200 m backstroke	2:25.70	27	—N/a		did not advance	
Carmen Marquez Orellana	50 m butterfly	28.62	23	did not advance			

== Triathlon ==
El Salvador qualified two athletes based on its performance at the 2014 American Youth Olympic Games Qualifier.

Individual

Athlete	Event	Swim (750m)	Trans 1	Bike (20 km)	Trans 2	Run (5 km)	Total Time	Rank
Bryan Mendoza Ramos	Boys	10:29	0:43	31:01	0:25	17:36	1:00:14	24
Giovanna Gonzalez Miranda	Girls	10:54	0:52	32:54	0:52	20:23	1:05:30	21

Relay

Athlete	Event	Total Times per Athlete (Swim 250m, Bike 6.6 km, Run 1.8 km)	Total Group Time	Rank
America 3 Barbara Dos Santos (BRA); Tyler Smith (BER); Giovanna Gonzalez Miranda (ESA); Jose Solorzano (VEN)	Mixed Relay	22:51; 21:04; 24:11; 22:11	1:30:17	11
America 4 Ana Catalina Barahona (CRC); Diego Lopez Acosta (MEX); Maria Velasquez Soto (COL); Bryan Mendoza Ramos (ESA)	Mixed Relay	24:05; 20:37; 24:39; 21:07	1:30:28	12

== Wrestling ==
El Salvador qualified one athlete based on its performance at the 2014 Pan American Cadet Championships.

Key:
- VT - Victory by Fall.
- PP - Decision by Points - the loser with technical points.
- PO - Decision by Points - the loser without technical points.

Girls

Athlete	Event	Group stage				Final / RM	Rank
Athlete	Event	Opposition Score	Opposition Score	Opposition Score	Rank	Opposition Score	Rank
Mayra Vasquez Aparicio	Freestyle -52kg	O Kremzer (UKR); L 0 – 4	T Kennett (CAN); L 0 – 4	L Gurbanova (AZE); L 0 – 4	4 Q	S Dorn (CAM); L 0 – 4	8
