= Cuba at the 2014 Summer Youth Olympics =

- IOC code: CUB
- NOC: Cuban Olympic Committee

in Nanjing
- Competitors: 12 in 7 sports
- Medals Ranked 35th: Gold 2 Silver 1 Bronze 1 Total 4

Summer Youth Olympics appearances
- 2010; 2014; 2018; 2026

Cuba competed at the 2014 Summer Youth Olympics, in Nanjing, China from 16 August to 28 August 2014.

== Medalists ==
Medal	Name	Sport	Event	Date
Gold	Javier Ibáñez	Boxing	Boys' -56 kg	27 August
Gold	Yordan Hernández	Boxing	Boys' -91 kg	27 August
Silver	Alain Limonta	Boxing	Boys' -60 kg	27 August
Bronze	Ivan Felipe Silva Morales	Judo	Boys' -81 kg	18 August

== Archery ==
Cuba qualified a female archer from its performance at the 2013 World Archery Youth Championships.

Individual

Athlete	Event	Ranking round		Round of 32	Round of 16	Quarterfinals	Semifinals	Final / BM	Rank
Athlete	Event	Score	Seed	Opposition Score	Opposition Score	Opposition Score	Opposition Score	Opposition Score	Rank
Rosangel Sainz Rodriguez	Girls' Individual	602	28	Melanie Gaubil (FRA); L 2–6	Did not advance				17

Team

Athletes	Event	Ranking round		Round of 32	Round of 16	Quarterfinals	Semifinals	Final / BM	Rank
Athletes	Event	Score	Seed	Opposition Score	Opposition Score	Opposition Score	Opposition Score	Opposition Score	Rank
Rosangel Sainz Rodriguez (CUB); Luis Tapia (MEX)	Mixed Team	1283	18	Freywald (GER); Zolkepeli (MAS); L 3–5	Did not advance				17

== Boxing ==
Cuba qualified three boxers based on its performance at the 2014 AIBA Youth World Championships

Boys

Athlete	Event	Preliminaries	Semifinals	Final / RM	Rank
Athlete	Event	Opposition Result	Opposition Result	Opposition Result	Rank
Javier Ibáñez	-56 kg	Said (TUN); W 3–0	McGrail (GBR); W 2–1	Mihaylov (BUL); W 3–0	1st place, gold medalist(s)
Alain Limonta	-60 kg	Bye	Hosaka (JPN); W 3–0	Zhussupov (KAZ); L 1–2	2nd place, silver medalist(s)
Yordan Hernández	-91 kg	Marton (UKR); W 3–0	Gallagher (IRL); W 3–0	Filipi (CRO); W 2–1	1st place, gold medalist(s)

== Canoeing ==
Cuba qualified one boat based on its performance at the 2013 World Junior Canoe Sprint and Slalom Championships.

Boys

Athlete	Event	Qualification		Repechage		Round of 16		Quarterfinals	Semifinals	Final / BM	Rank
Athlete	Event	Time	Rank	Time	Rank	Time	Rank	Opposition Result	Opposition Result	Opposition Result	Rank
Hector Bouza Leyva	K1 slalom	1:20.322	9 Q	—N/a		1:22.509	10	Did not advance			10
Hector Bouza Leyva	K1 sprint	1:37.696	7 Q	—N/a		1:36.729	5 Q	Daineka (BLR); 1:35.219 L	Did not advance		

== Judo ==
Cuba qualified two athletes based on its performance at the 2013 Cadet World Judo Championships.

Individual

Athlete	Event	Round of 32	Round of 16	Quarterfinals	Semifinals	Rep 1	Rep 2	Rep 3	Rep 4	Final / BM	Rank
Athlete	Event	Opposition Result	Opposition Result	Opposition Result	Opposition Result	Opposition Result	Opposition Result	Opposition Result	Opposition Result	Opposition Result	Rank
Ivan Felipe Silva Morales	Boys' -81 kg	—N/a	Kovac (CRO); W 100-000	Kovac (NED); L 001-010	Did not advance	—N/a		Egutidze (POR); W 101-000	Bubanja (AUT); W 000-000	Majdov (SRB); W 010-000	3rd place, bronze medalist(s)

Team

Athletes	Event	Round of 16	Quarterfinals	Semifinals	Final	Rank
Athletes	Event	Opposition Result	Opposition Result	Opposition Result	Opposition Result	Rank
Team Van De Walle; Paola Acevedo (PUR); Leyla Aliyeva (AZE); Nokutula Banda (ZAM); Marco Montoya (COL); Ivan Silva Morales (CUB); Unelle Snyman (RSA); Peta Zadro (BIH)	Mixed Team	Bye	Team Geesink (MIX); L 3 – 4	Did not advance		5

== Rowing ==
Cuba qualified one boat based on its performance at the 2013 World Rowing Junior Championships. Later Cuba qualified another boat based on its performance at the Latin American Qualification Regatta.

Athlete	Event	Heats		Repechage		Semifinals		Final	
Athlete	Event	Time	Rank	Time	Rank	Time	Rank	Time	Rank
Orlando Sotolongo	Boys' Single Sculls	3:25.11	1 SA/B	—N/a		3:24.33	3 FA	3:32.14	6
Ilianny Roman Olivera	Girls' Single Sculls	3:51.70	3 R	3:52.30	3 SC/D	3:58.09	1 FC	4:01.70	13

Qualification Legend: FA=Final A (medal); FB=Final B (non-medal); FC=Final C (non-medal); FD=Final D (non-medal); SA/B=Semifinals A/B; SC/D=Semifinals C/D; R=Repechage

== Swimming ==
Cuba qualified three swimmers.

Boys

Athlete	Event	Heat		Final	
Athlete	Event	Time	Rank	Time	Rank
Luis Vega Torres	400 m freestyle	4:11.37	31	Did not advance	
Luis Vega Torres	800 m freestyle	—N/a		8:31.85	21
Huberto del Rio Casin	200 m butterfly	2:03.41	11	Did not advance	

Girls

Athlete	Event	Heat		Semifinal		Final	
Athlete	Event	Time	Rank	Time	Rank	Time	Rank
Elisbet Gamez Matos	50 m freestyle	26.85	24	Did not advance			
Elisbet Gamez Matos	100 m freestyle	57.25	15 Q	57.11	15	Did not advance	
Elisbet Gamez Matos	200 m freestyle	2:02.73	14	—N/a		Did not advance	

== Triathlon ==
Cuba qualified one athlete based on its performance at the 2014 American Youth Olympic Games Qualifier.

Individual

Athlete	Event	Swim (750m)	Trans 1	Bike (20 km)	Trans 2	Run (5 km)	Total Time	Rank
Victor Herrera de la Hoz	Boys	09:28	00:43	29:56	00:30	20:35	1:01:12	26

Relay

Athlete	Event	Total Times per Athlete (Swim 250m, Bike 6.6 km, Run 1.8 km)	Total Group Time	Rank
World Team 1 Jessica Romero Tinoco (MEX); Victor Manuel Herrera de la Hoz (CUB); Sofiya Pryyma (UKR); Philip Horwarth (AUT)	Mixed Relay	23:58; 21:07; 23:07; 20:52	1:29:04	10
