= Singapore at the 2014 Summer Youth Olympics =

- IOC code: SIN
- NOC: Singapore National Olympic Council

in Nanjing
- Competitors: 18 in 8 sports
- Flag bearer: Jonathan Chan (Diving)
- Medals Ranked 36th: Gold 2 Silver 1 Bronze 0 Total 3

Summer Youth Olympics appearances
- 2010; 2014; 2018

Singapore competed at the 2014 Summer Youth Olympics, in Nanjing, China from 16 August to 28 August 2014.

Singapore won its first ever gold medal in the youth olympics at this edition of the Youth Olympic Games.

== Medalists ==
Medals awarded to participants of mixed-NOC (Combined) teams are represented in italics. These medals are not counted towards the individual NOC medal tally.

Singapore medalists:

Medal	Name	Sport	Event	Date
Gold	Bernie Cheok	Sailing	Boys' Byte CII	23 Aug
Gold	Samantha Yom	Sailing	Girls' Byte CII	23 Aug
Silver	Martina Lindsay Veloso	Shooting	Girls' 10m Air Rifle	19 Aug
Silver	Teh Xiu Yi	Shooting	Mixed Team 10m Air Pistol	21 Aug

== Athletics ==
Singapore qualified one athlete.

Qualification Legend: Q=Final A (medal); qB=Final B (non-medal); qC=Final C (non-medal); qD=Final D (non-medal); qE=Final E (non-medal)

Girls
Track & road events

Athlete	Event	Heats		Final	
Athlete	Event	Result	Rank	Result	Rank
Nur Zaini Izlyn	100 m hurdles	14.58	17 qC	15.60	4

== Badminton ==
Singapore qualified two athletes based on the 2 May 2014 BWF Junior World Rankings.

Singles

Athlete	Event	Group stage				Quarterfinal	Semifinal	Final / BM	Rank
Athlete	Event	Opposition Score	Opposition Score	Opposition Score	Rank	Opposition Score	Opposition Score	Opposition Score	Rank
Soon Yang Bernard Ong	Boys' Singles	Seo (KOR); L 0-2	Shi (CHN); L 0-2	Ayittey (GHA); WO 2-0	3	Did not advance			
Liang Xiaoyu	Girls' Singles	Kabelo (BOT); W 2-0	Kim (KOR); L 0-2	Demirbag (TUR); W 2-0	2	Did not advance			

Doubles

Athlete	Event	Group stage				Quarterfinal	Semifinal	Final / BM	Rank
Athlete	Event	Opposition Score	Opposition Score	Opposition Score	Rank	Opposition Score	Opposition Score	Opposition Score	Rank
Thilini Hendahewa (SRI); Soon Yang Bernard Ong (SIN)	Mixed Doubles	Ayittey (GHA); Gadde (IND); WO 2-0	Angodavidanalage (SRI); He (CHN); L 0-2	Mihigo (UGA); Courtois (FRA); W 2-0	2	Did not advance			
Liang Xiaoyu (SIN); Dragoslav Petrović (SRB)	Mixed Doubles	Garrido (MEX); Kuuba (EST); W 2-0	Lu (TPE); Lee (MAS); L 1-2	Pham (VIE); Demirbag (TUR); L 1-2	2	Did not advance			

== Diving ==
Singapore qualified one quota based on its performance at the Nanjing 2014 Diving Qualifying Event.

Athlete	Event	Preliminary		Final	
Athlete	Event	Points	Rank	Points	Rank
Jonathan Chan	Boys' 10 m platform	384.80	10	412.40	10
Ganna Krasnoshlyk (UKR); Jonathan Chan (SIN)	Mixed team	—		303.20	8

== Gymnastics ==
=== Artistic Gymnastics ===
Singapore qualified one athlete based on its performance at the 2014 Asian Artistic Gymnastics Championships.

Girls

Athlete	Event	Apparatus				Total	Rank
Athlete	Event	F	V	UB	BB	Total	Rank
Nadine Nathan Joy	Qualification	12.375 11	13.500 18	11.150 16	12.300 18	49.325	14 Q
Nadine Nathan Joy	All-Around	10.850	13.600	10.200	11.650	46.300	18

== Sailing ==
Singapore qualified two Byte CII boats based on its performance at the 2013 World Byte CII Championships. Singapore also qualified a Techno 293 boat from its performance at the Techno 293 Asian Continental Qualifiers.

Athlete	Event	Race											Net Points	Final Rank
Athlete	Event	1	2	3	4	5	6	7	8	9	10	M*	Net Points	Final Rank
Bernie Chin	Boys' Byte CII	21	(31); DNF	1	2	1	5	3	5	Cancelled		69.00	38.00	1st place, gold medalist(s)
Samantha Yom	Girls' Byte CII	2	5	3	(21)	2	2	11	2	Cancelled		48.00	27.00	1st place, gold medalist(s)
Ynez Si Ying Lim	Girls' Techno 293	(19)	9	11	6	7	6	13	Cancelled			71.00	52.00	10

== Shooting ==
Singapore qualified two shooters based on its performance at the 2014 Asian Shooting Championships.

Individual

Athlete	Event	Qualification		Final	
Athlete	Event	Points	Rank	Points	Rank
Martina Lindsay Veloso	Girls' 10m Air Rifle	415.7	4th	207.2	(silver)
Xiu Yi Teh	Girls' 10m Air Pistol	382	1st	96.2	7th

Team

Athletes	Event	Qualification		Round of 16	Quarterfinals	Semifinals	Final / BM	Rank
Athletes	Event	Points	Rank	Opposition Result	Opposition Result	Opposition Result	Opposition Result	Rank
Martina Lindsay Veloso (SIN); Daniel Clopatofsky Sanchez (AUS)	Mixed Team 10m Air Rifle		11 Q	Riccardi (SMR); Milovanovic (SRB); L 8 – 10	did not advance			17
Xiu Yi Teh (SIN); Ahmed Mohamed (EGY)	Mixed Team 10m Air Pistol		9 Q	Elzelingen (DEN); Summerell (AUS); W 10 - 5	Downing (AUS); Todorov (BUL); W	Rasmane (LAT); Madrid (GUA); W 10 - 9	Nencheva (BUL); Svechnikov (UZB); L 5 - 10	2nd place, silver medalist(s)

== Swimming ==
Singapore qualified four swimmers.

Boys

Athlete	Event	Heat		Semifinal		Final	
Athlete	Event	Time	Rank	Time	Rank	Time	Rank
Darren Lim	50 m freestyle	23.71	20	did not advance			
Darren Lim	100 m freestyle	DNS		did not advance			
Dylan Koo	50 m butterfly	26.22	34	did not advance			
Dylan Koo	100 m butterfly	56.24	20	did not advance			
Dylan Koo	200 m butterfly	2:06.04	19	—		did not advance	

Girls

Athlete	Event	Heat		Semifinal		Final	
Athlete	Event	Time	Rank	Time	Rank	Time	Rank
Marina Chan	50 m freestyle	26.29	10 Q	26.18	13	did not advance	
Marina Chan	100 m freestyle	57.44	19	did not advance			
Marina Chan	200 m freestyle	2:06.63	27	—		did not advance	
Marina Chan	50 m butterfly	27.54	12 Q	27.59	12	did not advance	
Marina Chan	100 m butterfly	1:03.22	20	did not advance			
Samantha Yeo	50 m breaststroke	32.69	16 Q	33.07	15	did not advance	
Samantha Yeo	100 m breaststroke	1:11.98	16 Q	1:11.46	16	did not advance	
Samantha Yeo	200 m breaststroke	2:35.41	15	—		did not advance	
Samantha Yeo	200 m individual medley	2:21.96	18	—		did not advance	

Mixed

Athlete	Event	Heat		Final	
Athlete	Event	Time	Rank	Time	Rank
Marina Chan; Dylan Koo; Darren Lim; Samantha Yeo	4 × 100 m freestyle relay	3:44.28	16	did not advance	
Marina Chan; Dylan Koo; Darren Lim; Samantha Yeo	4 × 100 m medley relay	—			

== Table Tennis ==
Singapore qualified two athletes based on its performance at the Asian Qualification Event.

Singles

Athlete	Event	Group Stage	Rank	Round of 16	Quarterfinals	Semifinals	Final / BM	Rank
Athlete	Event	Opposition Score	Rank	Opposition Score	Opposition Score	Opposition Score	Opposition Score	Rank
Jing Yuan Yin	Boys	Group D Yang (TPE)	3 qB		Allegro (BEL); W 3 - 2	Ranefur (SWE); L 2 - 3	did not advance	19
Jing Yuan Yin	Boys	Tanviriyavechakul (THA); L 1 - 3	3 qB		Allegro (BEL); W 3 - 2	Ranefur (SWE); L 2 - 3	did not advance	19
Jing Yuan Yin	Boys	Alassani (TOG); W 3 - 0	3 qB		Allegro (BEL); W 3 - 2	Ranefur (SWE); L 2 - 3	did not advance	19
Herng Hwee Yee	Girls	Group H Luo (CAN); L 0 - 3	4 qB	Wan (GER); L 2 - 3	did not advance			25
Herng Hwee Yee	Girls	Lagsir (ALG); L 1 - 3	4 qB	Wan (GER); L 2 - 3	did not advance			25
Herng Hwee Yee	Girls	Khetkhuan (THA); L 0 - 3	4 qB	Wan (GER); L 2 - 3	did not advance			25

Team

Athletes	Event	Group Stage	Rank	Round of 16	Quarterfinals	Semifinals	Final / BM	Rank
Athletes	Event	Opposition Score	Rank	Opposition Score	Opposition Score	Opposition Score	Opposition Score	Rank
Singapore; Herng Hwee Yee (SIN); Jing Yuan Yin (SIN)	Mixed	Group H Europe 1 Diaconu (ROU); Chen (POR); L 0-3	qB	Kazakhstan; Ryabova (KAZ); Gerassimenko (KAZ); W 2-0	India; Mukherjee (IND); Yadav (IND); L 1-2	did not advance		
Singapore; Herng Hwee Yee (SIN); Jing Yuan Yin (SIN)	Mixed	Australia; Bui (AUS); Huang (AUS); W 3-0	qB	Kazakhstan; Ryabova (KAZ); Gerassimenko (KAZ); W 2-0	India; Mukherjee (IND); Yadav (IND); L 1-2	did not advance		
Singapore; Herng Hwee Yee (SIN); Jing Yuan Yin (SIN)	Mixed	Czech Republic; Stefcova (CZE); Reitspies (CZE)	qB	Kazakhstan; Ryabova (KAZ); Gerassimenko (KAZ); W 2-0	India; Mukherjee (IND); Yadav (IND); L 1-2	did not advance		

Qualification Legend: Q=Main Bracket (medal); qB=Consolation Bracket (non-medal)

== Triathlon ==
Singapore qualified two athletes based on its performance at the 2014 Asian Youth Olympic Games Qualifier.

Individual

Athlete	Event	Swim (750m)	Trans 1	Bike (20 km)	Trans 2	Run (5 km)	Total Time	Rank
Chong Sheng Cher	Boys	09:42	00:39	29:40	00:24	19:28	0:59:53	22
Su Yin Chia Denise	Girls	10:58	00:49	32:51	00:29	20:59	1:06:06	24

Relay

Athlete	Event	Total Times per Athlete (Swim 250m, Bike 6.6 km, Run 1.8 km)	Total Group Time	Rank
Asia 2 Feng Jingshuang (CHN); Chong Sheng Cher (SIN); Chia Su Yin Denise (SIN); Koyo Yamasaki (JPN)	Mixed Relay	0:23:09; 0:22:16; 0:24:25; 0:21:00	01:30:50	13
