= Portugal at the 2014 Summer Youth Olympics =

- IOC code: POR
- NOC: Olympic Committee of Portugal
- Website: www.comiteolimpicoportugal.pt

in Nanjing
- Competitors: 21 in 10 sports
- Flag bearers: Pedro Ferreira (opening); Rodolfo Pires (closing)
- Medals Ranked 64th: Gold 0 Silver 1 Bronze 1 Total 2

Summer Youth Olympics appearances
- 2010; 2014; 2018

Portugal was represented at the 2014 Summer Youth Olympics, held in Nanjing, China, from 16 to 28 August 2014, with a delegation of 21 competitors, who took part in 10 events.

The Portuguese delegation won two medals, a silver in sailing by Rodolfo Pires and a bronze in trampoline gymnastics by Pedro Ferreira. In addition, two gold medals were won by Portuguese athletes as part of mixed teams: in judo by Maria Siderot and in modern pentathlon by Maria Teixeira.

== Medalists ==
Medal	Name	Sport	Event	Date
Gold	Maria Siderot	Judo	Mixed team (in mixed-NOC team with Team Rougé)	21 August
Gold	Maria Teixeira	Modern pentathlon	Mixed relay (in mixed-NOC team with Anton Kuznetsov (UKR))	26 August
Silver	Rodolfo Pires	Sailing	Boys' Byte CII	24 August
Bronze	Pedro Ferreira	Gymnastics	Boys' trampoline	22 August

== Athletics ==
Portugal qualified two athletes.

Girls
Field events

Athlete	Event	Qualification		Final	
Athlete	Event	Distance	Rank	Distance	Rank
Jéssica Barreira	Triple jump	12.15	11 qB	12.13	11
Ana Fernandes	Hammer throw	56.79	14 qB	59.06 PB	10

Qualification legend: Q=Final A (medal); qB=Final B (non-medal); qC=Final C (non-medal); qD=Final D (non-medal); qE=Final E (non-medal)

== Canoeing ==
Portugal qualified one boat based on its performance at the 2013 World Junior Canoe Sprint and Slalom Championships.

Boys

Athlete	Event	Qualification		Repechage		Round of 16		Quarterfinals	Semifinals	Final / BM	Rank
Athlete	Event	Time	Rank	Time	Rank	Time	Rank	Opposition Result	Opposition Result	Opposition Result	Rank
Luis Ferreira	K1 slalom	DSQ		Did not advance							–
Luis Ferreira	K1 sprint	1:37.339	6 Q	—		1:37.625	8 Q	Milinković (SRB); L 1:38.152	Did not advance		8

== Cycling ==
Portugal qualified a boys' and girls' team based on its ranking issued by the UCI.

Team

Athletes	Event	Cross-Country Eliminator		Time Trial			BMX		Cross-Country Race			Road Race			Total Pts	Rank
Athletes	Event	Rank	Points	Time	Rank	Points	Rank	Points	Time	Rank	Points	Time	Rank	Points	Total Pts	Rank
Bruno Machado; Tiago Antunes	Boys' Team	20	0	5:27.26	20	0	10	20	58:43	9	15	1:37:23; 1:37:23	18; 2	80	115	11
Ana Lopes; Ana Silvestre	Girls' Team	22	0	6:32.48	23	0	15	4	49:12	12	6	1:12:36; 1:12:36	25; 28	0	10	27

Mixed Relay

Athletes	Event	Cross-Country Girls' Race	Cross-Country Boys' Race	Boys' Road Race	Girls' Road Race	Total Time	Rank
Ana Silvestre; Bruno Machado; Tiago Antunes; Ana Lopes	Mixed Team Relay	3:28	6:19	11:55	18:23	18:23	12

== Gymnastics ==
=== Artistic Gymnastics ===
Portugal qualified one athlete based on its performance at the 2014 European WAG Championships.

Girls

Athlete	Event	Apparatus				Total	Rank
Athlete	Event	F	V	UB	BB	Total	Rank
Sara Raposeiro	Qualification	12.350	13.250	9.800	10.875	46.275	27

=== Trampoline ===
Portugal qualified one athlete based on its performance at the 2014 European Trampoline Championships.

Athlete	Event	Qualification				Final	
Athlete	Event	Routine 1	Routine 2	Total	Rank	Score	Rank
Pedro Ferreira	Boys	44.380	50.510	94.890	7 Q	56.040	3rd place, bronze medalist(s)

== Judo ==
Portugal qualified two athletes based on its performance at the 2013 Cadet World Judo Championships.

Individual

Athlete	Event	Round of 32	Round of 16	Quarterfinals	Semifinals	Rep 1	Rep 2	Rep 3	Rep 4	Final / BM	Rank
Athlete	Event	Opposition Result	Opposition Result	Opposition Result	Opposition Result	Opposition Result	Opposition Result	Opposition Result	Opposition Result	Opposition Result	Rank
Anri Egutidze	Boys' -81 kg	Bye	Bubanja (AUT); L 0001–1001	Did not advance		Montoya (COL); W 100–000	Ndiaye (SEN); W 100–000	Silva Morales (CUB); W 000–101	Did not advance		9
Maria Siderot	Girls' -52 kg	—N/a	Bye	Stangar (SLO); L 0000–1001	Did not advance	Lee (KOR); L 0003–0001	Did not advance				13

Team

Athletes	Event	Round of 16	Quarterfinals	Semifinals	Final	Rank
Athletes	Event	Opposition Result	Opposition Result	Opposition Result	Opposition Result	Rank
Team Berghmans; Anri Egutidze (POR); Edlene Mondelly (HAI); Michaela Polleres (AUT); Pamela Quizhpi (ECU); Domenik Schonefeldt (GER); Adela Szarzecova (CZE); Wu Zhiqiang (CHN)	Mixed Team	Team Kerr (MIX); W 4–2	Team Xian (MIX); L 3–4	did not advance		5
Team Rouge; Morgane Duchene (FRA); Ayelén Elizeche (ARG); Adrian Gandia (PUR); Mikhail Igolnikov (RUS); Lisa Millenberg (NED); Maria Siderot (POR); Sukhrob Tursunov (UZB)	Mixed Team	Team Kano (MIX); W 5–2	Team Ruska (MIX); W 5–2	Team Xian (MIX); W 4–3	Team Geesink (MIX); W 4–2	1st place, gold medalist(s)

== Modern pentathlon ==
Portugal qualified two athletes based on the 1 June 2014 Olympic Youth A Pentathlon World Rankings.

Athlete	Event	Fencing Ranking Round (épée one touch)		Swimming (200 m freestyle)			Fencing Final round (épée one touch)			Combined: Shooting/Running (10 m air pistol)/(3000 m)			Total Points	Final Rank
Athlete	Event	Results	Rank	Time	Rank	Points	Results	Rank	Points	Time	Rank	Points	Total Points	Final Rank
Daniel Lopes	Boys' Individual	7V/16D	21	2:02.76	3	332		19	215	13:40.48	24	480	1027	22
Maria Teixeira	Girls' Individual	10V/13D	16	2:19.17	7	283		17	225	13:56.66	9	465	973	13
Anna Matthes (GER); Daniel Lopes (POR)	Mixed Relay	20V/26D	18	2:01.86	7	335		16	255	12:51.87	20	529	1119	20
Maria Teixeira (POR); Anton Kuznetsov (UKR)	Mixed Relay	24V/22D	9	1:58.45	2	345		9	276	11:57.05	1	583	1204	1st place, gold medalist(s)

== Sailing ==
Portugal qualified two boats based on its performance at the Byte CII European Continental Qualifiers.

Athlete	Event	Race											Net Points	Final Rank
Athlete	Event	1	2	3	4	5	6	7	8	9	10	M*	Net Points	Final Rank
Rodolfo Pires	Boys' Byte CII	16	2	8	4	9	1	~~26~~	C	C	C	7	47	2nd place, silver medalist(s)
Mafalda Pires de Lima	Girls' Byte CII	~~31~~	9	13	9	22	18	22	C	C	C	28	121	21

== Swimming ==
Portugal qualified four swimmers.

Boys

Athlete	Event	Heat		Final	
Athlete	Event	Time	Rank	Time	Rank
André Farinha	200 m freestyle	1:57.38	29	Did not advance	
André Farinha	400 m freestyle	4:06.13	26	Did not advance	
Rafael Gil	400 m freestyle	4:00.11	21	Did not advance	
Rafael Gil	800 m freestyle	—N/a		8:16.91	16

Girls

Athlete	Event	Heat		Final	
Athlete	Event	Time	Rank	Time	Rank
Tamila Holub	200 m freestyle	2:06.91	28	Did not advance	
Tamila Holub	400 m freestyle	4:23.24	19	Did not advance	
Tamila Holub	800 m freestyle	—N/a		8:54.50	12
Florbela Machado	800 m freestyle	—N/a		8:57.83	13

== Table tennis ==
Portugal qualified one athlete based on its performance at the European Qualification Event.

Singles

Athlete	Event	Group stage	Rank	Round of 16	Quarterfinals	Semifinals	Final / BM	Rank
Athlete	Event	Opposition Score	Rank	Opposition Score	Opposition Score	Opposition Score	Opposition Score	Rank
Diogo Chen	Boys	Group E Ghallab (EGY); W 3–1	1	Ort (GER); L 3–4	Did not advance			9
Diogo Chen	Boys	Kim (KOR); W 3–2	1	Ort (GER); L 3–4	Did not advance			9
Diogo Chen	Boys	Toranzos (PAR); W 3–0	1	Ort (GER); L 3–4	Did not advance			9

Team

Athletes	Event	Group stage	Rank	Round of 16	Quarterfinals	Semifinals	Final / BM	Rank
Athletes	Event	Opposition Score	Rank	Opposition Score	Opposition Score	Opposition Score	Opposition Score	Rank
Europe 1 Adina Diaconu (ROU); Diogo Chen (POR)	Mixed	Singapore; W 3–0	1	Croatia; L 0–2	Did not advance			9
Europe 1 Adina Diaconu (ROU); Diogo Chen (POR)	Mixed	Czech Republic; W 2–1	1	Croatia; L 0–2	Did not advance			9
Europe 1 Adina Diaconu (ROU); Diogo Chen (POR)	Mixed	Australia; W 3–0	1	Croatia; L 0–2	Did not advance			9

Qualification Legend: Q=Main Bracket (medal); qB=Consolation Bracket (non-medal)

== Triathlon ==
Portugal qualified one athlete based on its performance at the 2014 European Youth Olympic Games Qualifier.

Individual

Athlete	Event	Swim (750m)	Trans 1	Bike (20 km)	Trans 2	Run (5 km)	Total Time	Rank
Miguel Cassiano	Boys	9:41	0.43	28:39	0.24	17:18	56:45	13

Relay

Athlete	Event	Total Times per Athlete (Swim 250m, Bike 6.6 km, Run 1.8 km)	Total Group Time	Rank
Europe 4 Alberte Pedersen (DEN); Miguel Cassiano (POR); Amber Rombaut (BEL); Omri Bahat (ISR)	Mixed Relay	21:21; 19:50; 22:29; 20:15	1:23:54	4
