= Athletics at the 2014 Summer Youth Olympics – Girls' 100 metres =

Athletics – Girls' 100 metres at the II Summer Youth Olympic Games
- Venue: Nanjing Olympic Sports Centre
- Date: August 21–23
- Competitors: 32 from 32 nations

Medalists
1st place, gold medalist(s)		Liang Xiaojing	China
2nd place, silver medalist(s)		Paraskevi Andreou	Cyprus
3rd place, bronze medalist(s)		Samantha Geddes	Australia

The girls' 100 m competition at the 2014 Summer Youth Olympics was held on 21–23 August 2014. The event took place in Nanjing Olympic Sports Center, Nanjing, China.

== Schedule ==
Date	Time	Round
21 August 2014	20:05	Heats
23 August 2014	21:00	Final

== Results ==
=== Heats ===
Eight fastest athletes advanced to Final A, the others advanced to Final B, C, or D according to their times.

Rank	Heat	Lane	Athlete	Result	Notes	Q
1	3	6	Ewa Swoboda (POL)	11.30	NJR	FA
2	1	5	Liang Xiaojing (CHN)	11.64	=PB	FA
3	3	7	Paraskevi Andreou (CYP)	11.65	PB	FA
4	1	2	Samantha Geddes (AUS)	11.69	PB	FA
5	4	7	Bliss Jade Soleyn (ANT)	11.77	PB	FA
6	4	4	Tristan Evelyn (BAR)	11.81		FA
6	2	3	Nelda Huggins (IVB)	11.81		FA
8	1	6	Jenae Ambrose (BAH)	11.84		FA
9	3	5	Shanice Reid (JAM)	11.86		FB
10	2	9	Cecilia Tamayo (MEX)	11.88		FB
11	4	9	Mirna Marques da Silva (BRA)	11.95		FB
12	3	3	Cynthia Leduc (FRA)	12.01	PB	FB
13	1	7	Evelyn Rivera (COL)	12.20		FB
14	2	4	Veronika Palicková (CZE)	12.26		FB
15	2	8	Maboundou Kone (CIV)	12.50		FB
16	4	3	Janie O'connor (USA)	12.56		FB
17	1	9	Mazoon Al Alawi (OMA)	12.61		FC
18	2	5	Deslorn Lawrence (VIN)	12.78	YC, PB	FC
19	4	8	Elche Brichinelle Limbouanga (CGO)	12.97		FC
20	1	3	Aritza Nimi (BUR)	13.10		FC
21	4	5	Panha Viriyak Vatey Sokha (CAM)	13.11	PB	FC
22	3	4	Mathepelo Molapo (LES)	13.44		FC
23	4	2	Prestige Ndarata (CAF)	13.56		FC
24	3	9	Halime Koura (CHA)	13.59		FC
24	1	4	Hoka Jenitar (SOL)	13.59		FD
26	1	8	María Nzobeya Nzang (GEO)	13.97		FD
27	3	2	Rosie Mulipola (SAM)	14.01		FD
28	2	6	Phuthon Keothavong (LAO)	14.24		FD
29	2	7	Inesa Ca (GBS)	14.45		FD
30	3	8	Margaret Roren Beetaa (KIR)	15.04		FD
31	4	6	Faylani Grundler (NRU)	15.08		FD
	2	2	Kayla Yee (FIJ)	DNF		FD

=== Finals ===
==== Final A ====
Rank	Final Placing	Lane	Athlete	Result	Notes
1st place, gold medalist(s)	1	4	Liang Xiaojing (CHN)	11.65	
2nd place, silver medalist(s)	2	7	Paraskevi Andreou (CYP)	11.71	
3rd place, bronze medalist(s)	3	6	Samantha Geddes (AUS)	11.76	
4	4	9	Bliss Jade Soleyn (ANT)	11.77	=PB
5	5	2	Jenae Ambrose (BAH)	11.85	
6	6	8	Nelda Huggins (IVB)	11.87	
7	7	3	Tristan Evelyn (BAR)	11.95	
		5	Ewa Swoboda (POL)	DSQ	

==== Final B ====
Rank	Final Placing	Lane	Athlete	Result	Notes
1	8	7	Cecilia Tamayo (MEX)	11.83	
2	9	6	Shanice Reid (JAM)	11.97	
3	10	9	Evelyn Rivera (COL)	12.11	
4	11	5	Mirna Marques da Silva (BRA)	12.12	
5	12	4	Cynthia Leduc (FRA)	12.15	
6	13	8	Veronika Palicková (CZE)	12.41	
7	14	2	Maboundou Kone (CIV)	12.55	
		3	Janie O'connor (USA)	DNS	

==== Final C ====
Rank	Final Placing	Lane	Athlete	Result	Notes
1	15	7	Mazoon Al Alawi (OMA)	12.50	PB
2	16	6	Deslorn Lawrence (VIN)	12.70	PB
3	17	4	Elche Brichinelle Limbouanga (CGO)	12.93	
4	18	8	Panha Viriyak Vatey Sokha (CAM)	13.03	PB
5	19	2	Halime Koura (CHA)	13.49	
6	20	3	Prestige Ndarata (CAF)	13.49	
		9	Mathepelo Molapo (LES)	DSQ	
		5	Aritza Nimi (BUR)	DNS	

==== Final D ====
Rank	Final Placing	Lane	Athlete	Result	Notes
1	21	6	Hoka Jenitar (SOL)	13.54	
2	22	7	Rosie Mulipola (SAM)	13.90	
3	23	5	Phuthon Keothavong (LAO)	13.98	
4	24	3	Faylani Grundler (NRU)	14.94	
		4	María Nzobeya Nzang (GEO)	DSQ	
		8	Margaret Roren Beetaa (KIR)	DNS	
		9	Inesa Ca (GBS)	DNS	
		2	Kayla Yee (FIJ)	DNS	
