= Rebeca Quinteros =

Salvadoran swimmer (born 1997)

Personal information
- Full name: Rebeca Lissette Quinteros Ortíz
- Nationality: Salvadoran
- Born: 28 August 1997 (age 28)

Sport
- Sport: Swimming

Rebeca Lissette Quinteros Ortíz (born 28 August 1997) is a Salvadoran swimmer. She competed in the women's 400 metre freestyle event at the 2016 Summer Olympics, finishing in 32nd position. Her time was just under five minutes in an event that was won by American swimmer Katie Ledecky. In 2014, she represented El Salvador at the 2014 Summer Youth Olympics held in Nanjing, China.
