= Nigeria at the 2014 Summer Youth Olympics =

- IOC code: NGR
- NOC: Nigeria Olympic Committee

Summer Youth Olympics appearances (overview)
- 2010; 2014; 2018

Nigeria was planning to participate at the 2014 Summer Youth Olympics, in Nanjing, China, but on 13 August 2014 they pulled out of the games due to pressure from Chinese Authorities in an attempt to prevent Ebola from West Africa from entering their nation.

== Athletics ==
Nigeria qualified seven athletes.

Qualification Legend: Q=Final A (medal); qB=Final B (non-medal); qC=Final C (non-medal); qD=Final D (non-medal); qE=Final E (non-medal)

Boys
Track & road events

Athlete	Event	Heats		Final	
Athlete	Event	Result	Rank	Result	Rank
Samson Nathaneil	400 m	Withdrew			
Bashiru Abdullahi	110 m hurdles	Withdrew			

Field Events

Athlete	Event	Qualification		Final	
Athlete	Event	Distance	Rank	Distance	Rank
Fabian Edoki	Triple jump	Withdrew			

Girls
Track & road events

Athlete	Event	Heats		Final	
Athlete	Event	Result	Rank	Result	Rank
Mercy Ntia-Obong	100 m	Withdrew			
Praise Idamadudu	200 m	Withdrew			
Oluwatobiloba Amusan	100 m hurdles	Withdrew			
Abimbola Junaid	400 m hurdles	Withdrew			

== Beach Volleyball ==
Nigeria qualified a boys' and girls' team by their performance at the CAVB Qualification Tournament.

Athletes	Event	Preliminary round	Standing	Round of 24	Round of 16	Quarterfinals	Semifinals	Final / BM	Rank
Athletes	Event	Opposition Score	Standing	Opposition Score	Opposition Score	Opposition Score	Opposition Score	Opposition Score	Rank
Phillip Akande; Samuel Morris	Boys'	Withdrew							
Jummai Bitrus; Tochukwu Nnoruga	Girls'	Withdrew							

== Wrestling ==
Nigeria qualified one athlete based on its performance at the 2014 African Cadet Championships.

Key:

- VT - Victory by Fall.
- PP - Decision by Points - the loser with technical points.
- PO - Decision by Points - the loser without technical points.

Girls

Athlete	Event	Group stage				Final / RM	Rank
Athlete	Event	Opposition Score	Opposition Score	Opposition Score	Rank	Opposition Score	Rank
Bose Samuel	Freestyle -46kg	Withdrew					
