= Jummai Bitrus =

Nigerian volleyball player

Personal information
- Nationality: Nigeria
- Born: September 4, 1996 (age 30)
- Hometown: Yola, Adamawa state
- Height: 167 cm (5 ft 6 in)
- Weight: 70 kg (154 lb)
- Spike: 276
- Block: 244

Volleyball information
- Position: Libero
- Current club: Chief of Naval Staff (CNS) Spikers women’s volleyball team

Jummai Bitrus (born September 4, 1996, in Yola) is a Nigerian volleyball player who plays as a Libero for Chief of Naval Staff (CNS) Spikers women's volleyball team and Nigeria women's national volleyball team.

== Jummai Bitrus Initiative Programme ==
She have promised to use this initiative programme to advance hundreds of volleyball players in North East part of Nigeria since someone also assist her to achieve her dream.

== Career history ==
Jummai Bitrus said she was a ball girl before starting to play volleyball for Adamawa Queens of Yola. She also played for Nigerian Immigration Service (NIS) team before joining Nigeria Security and Civil Defense Corp (NSCDC) in 2018. She was the best Libero player in country in the 2019 Nigeria Volleyball Premier League. She was again named as the best Libero player in country in the 2022 Nigeria Volleyball Premier League in Akure. Bitrus joined Chief of Naval Staff (CNS) Spikers women's volleyball team for the 2023 Nigeria Volleyball Premier League.

=== Nigeria national team ===
Bitrus was part of the volleyball players that represented Nigeria during the 2019 African games in Rabat, Morocco.

Jummai Bitrus was part of the 19 Nigeria women volleyball team that plays Tokyo 2020 Olympic qualifiers in Cameroon which takes place from 2 January to 9 January 2020.

She was again part of the 19 volleyball players that Samuel Ajayi named to represent Nigeria for the 21st African Women's Volleyball Championship which takes place from 14 August to 29 August 2023 in Yaounde, Cameroon.

She was part of the volleyball players that play 2024 African Games Qualifiers which was scheduled from 4 January to 8 January at the National Stadium in Lagos.

she was also part of the volleyball players that represent Nigeria during the 13th African Games in Ghana which takes place from 8 March to 23 March 2024.
