= 2014 Summer Youth Olympics medal table =

The 2014 Summer Youth Olympics medal table is a list of National Olympic Committees (NOCs) ranked by the number of gold medals won by their athletes during the 2014 Summer Youth Olympics, held in Nanjing, China, from 17 to 27 August 2014.

Of the nations that won medals at these Games, two had not won an Olympic medal – El Salvador and Fiji. A further four nations – Ghana, Moldova, Singapore and Zambia – won their first gold medals at an Olympic event, having previously only won medals of other colours.

== Medal table ==
The Organizing Committee is not keeping an official medal tally. The ranking in this table is based on information provided by the International Olympic Committee (IOC) and is consistent with IOC convention in its published medal tables. By default, the table is ordered by the number of gold medals the athletes from a nation have won (in this context, a "nation" is an entity represented by a National Olympic Committee). The number of silver medals is taken into consideration next and then the number of bronze medals. If nations are still tied, equal ranking is given and they are listed alphabetically.

In a number of events, there were teams in which athletes from different nations competed together. Medals won by these teams are included in the table as medals awarded to a mixed-NOCs team.

* Host nation (China)

Rank	Nation	Gold	Silver	Bronze	Total
1	China*	38	13	14	65
2	Russia	27	19	11	57
–	Mixed-NOCs	13	12	14	39
3	United States	10	5	7	22
4	France	8	3	9	20
5	Japan	7	9	5	21
6	Ukraine	7	8	8	23
7	Italy	7	8	6	21
8	Hungary	6	6	11	23
9	Brazil	6	6	1	13
10	Azerbaijan	5	6	1	12
11	Great Britain	5	5	10	20
12	Poland	5	0	1	6
13	South Korea	4	6	5	15
14	Australia	4	3	14	21
15	Belarus	4	3	0	7
16	Chinese Taipei	3	3	2	8
16	Ethiopia	3	3	2	8
18	Thailand	3	2	3	8
19	Lithuania	3	2	2	7
20	North Korea	3	2	0	5
21	Kazakhstan	3	1	4	8
22	Croatia	3	1	1	5
23	Jamaica	3	1	0	4
24	Iran	3	0	3	6
25	Germany	2	8	15	25
26	Bulgaria	2	4	0	6
27	Uzbekistan	2	3	3	8
28	Romania	2	3	0	5
29	Armenia	2	2	3	7
29	Slovenia	2	2	3	7
31	Kenya	2	2	1	5
32	Spain	2	1	6	9
33	Egypt	2	1	5	8
34	New Zealand	2	1	2	5
35	Cuba	2	1	1	4
36	Singapore	2	1	0	3
36	Switzerland	2	1	0	3
38	Netherlands	1	4	5	10
39	Turkey	1	3	6	10
40	Czech Republic	1	3	3	7
41	Argentina	1	2	4	7
42	Sweden	1	2	3	6
43	Moldova	1	1	1	3
44	Vietnam	1	1	0	2
45	Norway	1	0	3	4
46	Colombia	1	0	2	3
47	Austria	1	0	1	2
47	Peru	1	0	1	2
49	Ghana	1	0	0	1
49	South Africa	1	0	0	1
49	Suriname	1	0	0	1
49	Zambia	1	0	0	1
53	Venezuela	0	6	2	8
54	Mexico	0	5	6	11
55	Canada	0	4	3	7
56	Hong Kong	0	4	1	5
57	Belgium	0	2	4	6
58	Georgia	0	2	1	3
58	Ireland	0	2	1	3
58	Slovakia	0	2	1	3
61	Botswana	0	2	0	2
61	Greece	0	2	0	2
63	Denmark	0	1	3	4
64	Bahrain	0	1	1	2
64	India	0	1	1	2
64	Malaysia	0	1	1	2
64	Portugal	0	1	1	2
64	Trinidad and Tobago	0	1	1	2
64	Tunisia	0	1	1	2
70	Bosnia and Herzegovina	0	1	0	1
70	Burundi	0	1	0	1
70	Cyprus	0	1	0	1
70	Dominican Republic	0	1	0	1
70	El Salvador	0	1	0	1
70	Kyrgyzstan	0	1	0	1
70	Mongolia	0	1	0	1
70	Serbia	0	1	0	1
70	Uganda	0	1	0	1
79	Bahamas	0	0	2	2
80	Djibouti	0	0	1	1
80	Fiji	0	0	1	1
80	Grenada	0	0	1	1
80	Iceland	0	0	1	1
80	Indonesia	0	0	1	1
80	Iraq	0	0	1	1
80	Latvia	0	0	1	1
80	Morocco	0	0	1	1
Totals (87 entries)		224	220	240	684

Source: IOC
