= Judo at the 2014 Summer Youth Olympics =

Judo at the II Summer Youth Olympic Games
- Venue: Longjiang Gymnasium
- Dates: 17–21 August

Judo at the 2014 Summer Youth Olympics was held from 17 to 21 August at the Longjiang Gymnasium in Nanjing, China.

== Qualification ==
Each National Olympic Committee (NOC) can enter a maximum of 2 competitors, 1 per each gender. 86 athletes will qualify at the 2013 Cadet World Judo Championships held in Miami, United States 8–11 August 2013. The medal winners in each weight category from the Cadet World Championships will qualify to the Youth Olympics provided the nation does not exceed its maximum quota. Should a nation have more than the maximum quota it must choose which athletes will compete at the Youth Olympics; the unchosen quota will then be allocated to the next best ranked athlete. As hosts, China is given the maximum quota and a further 16, 8 in each gender will be decided by the Tripartite Commission.

To be eligible to participate at the Youth Olympics athletes must have been born between 1 January 1996 and 31 December 1998. Furthermore, all athletes must have participated in the 2013 Cadet World Championships or Continental Youth Championships and have the minimum Grade Blue Belt.

NOC	Boys				Girls				Total
NOC	-55 kg	-66 kg	-81 kg	-100 kg	-44 kg	-52 kg	-63 kg	-78 kg	Total
Algeria		X				X			2
Argentina				X		X			2
Armenia		X							1
Australia	X							X	2
Austria			X				X		2
Azerbaijan	X				X				2
Belarus		X				X			2
Belgium	X							X	2
Bosnia and Herzegovina		X						X	2
Botswana	X								1
Bulgaria		X				X			2
Canada			X				X		2
China		X				X			2
Chinese Taipei			X					X	2
Colombia			X				X		2
Costa Rica		X							1
Croatia			X					X	2
Cuba			X						1
Czech Republic							X		1
Dominican Republic					X				1
Ecuador					X				1
Estonia			X						1
France		X						X	2
Gabon						X			1
Georgia			X			X			2
Germany				X			X		2
Great Britain		X					X		2
Guam		X							1
Guatemala						X			1
Guinea							X		1
Haiti						X			1
Hungary		X					X		2
Iran				X					1
Israel			X						1
Italy		X					X		2
Ivory Coast							X		1
Japan		X			X				2
Kazakhstan	X				X				2
South Korea		X				X			2
Kyrgyzstan				X					1
Luxembourg			X						1
Madagascar						X			1
Malta			X						1
Monaco			X						1
Mongolia		X				X			2
Montenegro			X				X		2
Netherlands			X				X		2
Niger							X		1
Peru						X			1
Poland		X						X	2
Portugal			X			X			2
Puerto Rico		X				X			2
Romania							X		1
Russia			X		X				2
Senegal			X						1
Serbia			X				X		2
Slovenia						X			1
South Africa								X	1
Spain								X	1
Sweden						X			1
Tajikistan			X						1
Tunisia			X						1
Turkey	X				X				2
Ukraine		X					X		2
United States		X							1
Uzbekistan		X							1
Venezuela		X						X	2
Zambia							X		1
67 NOCs	6	21	21	4	7	17	17	11	104

== Schedule ==
The schedule was released by the Nanjing Youth Olympic Games Organizing Committee.

All times are CST (UTC+8)

Event date	Event day	Starting time	Event details
August 17	Sunday	13:00	Boys' -55 kg Preliminaries/Repechage; Girls' -44 kg Preliminaries/Repechage; Boys' -66 kg Preliminaries/Repechage
August 17	Sunday	18:00	Boys' -55 kg Medal Rounds; Girls' -44 kg Medal Rounds; Boys' -66 kg Medal Rounds
August 18	Monday	13:00	Girls' -52 kg Preliminaries/Repechage; Boys' -81 kg Preliminaries/Repechage; Girls' -63 kg Preliminaries/Repechage
August 18	Monday	18:00	Girls' -52 kg Medal Rounds; Boys' -81 kg Medal Rounds; Girls' -63 kg Medal Rounds
August 19	Tuesday	13:00	Girls' -78 kg Preliminaries/Repechage; Boys' -100 kg Preliminaries/Repechage
August 19	Tuesday	18:00	Girls' -78 kg Medal Rounds; Boys' -100 kg Medal Rounds
August 21	Thursday	12:00	Mixed Team Preliminaries/Repechage
August 21	Thursday	18:00	Mixed Team Medal Rounds

== Medal summary ==
=== Medal table ===
* Host nation (China)

Rank	Nation	Gold	Silver	Bronze	Total
1	Mixed-NOCs	1	1	1	3
2	Japan	1	0	1	2
2	Russia	1	0	1	2
2	Turkey	1	0	1	2
5	Brazil	1	0	0	1
5	Croatia	1	0	0	1
5	Hungary	1	0	0	1
5	Iran	1	0	0	1
5	Kazakhstan	1	0	0	1
10	Azerbaijan	0	2	0	2
11	Bosnia and Herzegovina	0	1	0	1
11	Bulgaria	0	1	0	1
11	Georgia	0	1	0	1
11	Kyrgyzstan	0	1	0	1
11	Romania	0	1	0	1
11	Ukraine	0	1	0	1
17	Germany	0	0	2	2
18	Austria	0	0	1	1
18	Belgium	0	0	1	1
18	China*	0	0	1	1
18	Cuba	0	0	1	1
18	Netherlands	0	0	1	1
18	Slovenia	0	0	1	1
18	South Korea	0	0	1	1
18	Spain	0	0	1	1
18	Uzbekistan	0	0	1	1
18	Venezuela	0	0	1	1
Totals (27 entries)		9	9	16	34

=== Boys' Events ===
Games	Gold	Silver	Bronze
-55 kg	Bauyrzhan Zhauyntayev; Kazakhstan	Natig Gurbanli; Azerbaijan	Jorre Verstraeten; Belgium
-55 kg	Bauyrzhan Zhauyntayev; Kazakhstan	Natig Gurbanli; Azerbaijan	Oğuzhan Karaca; Turkey
-66 kg	Hifumi Abe; Japan	Bogdan Iadov; Ukraine	Sukhrob Tursunov; Uzbekistan
-66 kg	Hifumi Abe; Japan	Bogdan Iadov; Ukraine	Wu Zhiqiang; China
-81 kg	Mikhail Igolnikov; Russia	Tamazi Kirakozashvili; Georgia	Frank de Wit; Netherlands
-81 kg	Mikhail Igolnikov; Russia	Tamazi Kirakozashvili; Georgia	Iván Felipe Silva Morales; Cuba
-100 kg	Ramin Safavieh; Iran	Rostislav Dashkov; Kyrgyzstan	Domenik Schönefeldt; Germany

=== Girls' Events ===
Games	Gold	Silver	Bronze
-44 kg	Melisa Çakmaklı; Turkey	Leyla Aliyeva; Azerbaijan	Anastasya Turcheva; Russia
-44 kg	Melisa Çakmaklı; Turkey	Leyla Aliyeva; Azerbaijan	Honoka Yamauchi; Japan
-52 kg	Layana Colman; Brazil	Betina Temelkova; Bulgaria	Maruša Štangar; Slovenia
-52 kg	Layana Colman; Brazil	Betina Temelkova; Bulgaria	Lee Hye-kyeong; South Korea
-63 kg	Szabina Gercsák; Hungary	Stefania Adelina Dobre; Romania	Jennifer Schwille; Germany
-63 kg	Szabina Gercsák; Hungary	Stefania Adelina Dobre; Romania	Michaela Polleres; Austria
-78 kg	Brigita Matić; Croatia	Aleksandra Samardzic; Bosnia and Herzegovina	Elvismar Rodríguez; Venezuela
-78 kg	Brigita Matić; Croatia	Aleksandra Samardzic; Bosnia and Herzegovina	Sara Rodríguez; Spain

=== Team Event ===
Games	Gold	Silver	Bronze
Mixed Team	Team Rougé; Morgane Duchêne (FRA); Ayelén Elizeche (ARG); Adrian Gandia (PUR); Mikhail Igolnikov (RUS); Lisa Müllenberg (NED); Maria Siderot (POR); Sukhrob Tursunov (UZB)	Team Geesink; Layana Colman (BRA); Nemanja Majdov (SRB); Dzmitry Minkou (BLR); Ryu Seung-hwan (KOR); Ivana Sunjevic (MNE); Anastasya Turcheva (RUS); Wang Yu-jyun (TPE)	Team Douillet; Gustavo Basile (ARG); Marko Bubanja (AUT); Adonis Diaz (USA); Liudmyla Drozdova (UKR); Lee Hye-kyeong (KOR); Brigita Matić (CRO); Peter Miles (GBR)
Mixed Team	Team Rougé; Morgane Duchêne (FRA); Ayelén Elizeche (ARG); Adrian Gandia (PUR); Mikhail Igolnikov (RUS); Lisa Müllenberg (NED); Maria Siderot (POR); Sukhrob Tursunov (UZB)	Team Geesink; Layana Colman (BRA); Nemanja Majdov (SRB); Dzmitry Minkou (BLR); Ryu Seung-hwan (KOR); Ivana Sunjevic (MNE); Anastasya Turcheva (RUS); Wang Yu-jyun (TPE)	Team Xian; Hifumi Abe (JPN); Chiara Carminucci (ITA); Naomi de Bruine (AUS); Jolan Florimont (FRA); Brillith Gamarra (PER); Felix Penning (LUX); Maruša Štangar (SLO); Idan Vardi (ISR)
