= Judo at the 2014 Summer Youth Olympics – Mixed team =

Judo competition

Mixed team at the II Summer Youth Olympic Games
- Venue: Longjiang Gymnasium
- Date: August 21

Medalists
1st place, gold medalist(s)		Team Rougé	Mixed-NOCs
2nd place, silver medalist(s)		Team Geesink	Mixed-NOCs
3rd place, bronze medalist(s)		Team Douillet	Mixed-NOCs
3rd place, bronze medalist(s)		Team Xian	Mixed-NOCs

The Mixed Team tournament in Judo at the 2014 Summer Youth Olympics was held on August 21 at the Longjiang Gymnasium.

Athletes of all weight classes were split into groups of 7 or 8 athletes in one of 13 teams. The tournament bracket consisted of a single-elimination contest where the team with the most wins moves to the next round culminating in a gold match. There were no repechages in this event, the two losing semi-finalists received bronze medals.

== Team names ==
The teams are named after renowned judokas:

- TEAM KANO - Jigorō Kanō - The founder of judo - First Asian Member of the IOC (1909-1938)
- TEAM GEESINK - Anton Geesink - Olympic Gold Champion Tokyo 1964 - Two-time World Champion, IOC member
- TEAM VAN DE WALLE - Robert Van de Walle - Olympic Gold Champion Moscow 1980 - Olympic Silver Medallist Seoul 1988
- TEAM DOUILLET - David Douillet - Olympic Gold Champion Atlanta 1996 / Sydney 2000 - Olympic Bronze Medallist Barcelona 1992 - Four-time World Champion
- TEAM BERGHMANS - Ingrid Berghmans - Olympic Gold Medallist Seoul 1988 - Six-time World Champion
- TEAM NEVZOROV - Vladimir Nevzorov - RUS - Olympic Gold Medallist Montreal 1976 - One-time World Champion
- TEAM TANI - Ryoko Tani - Olympic Gold Champion Sydney 2000 / Athens 2004 - Olympic Silver Medallist Barcelona 1992 / Atlanta 1996 - Olympic Bronze Medallist Beijing 2008 - Seven-times World Champion
- TEAM YAMASHITA - Yasuhiro Yamashita - Olympic Gold Champion Los Angeles 1984 - Four-time World Champion
- TEAM RUSKA - Willem Ruska - NED - Two-time Olympic Gold Champion Munich 1972
- TEAM XIAN - Dongmei Xian - Olympic Gold Champion Athens 2004 / Beijing 2008
- TEAM ROUGÉ - Jean-Luc Rougé - World Champion - Secretary General of IJF
- TEAM KERR - George Kerr - GBR - European Champion - Has 10th Dan IJF
- TEAM CHOCHISHVILI - Shota Chochishvili - Olympic Gold Medallist Munich 1972 - Olympic Bronze Medallist Montreal 1976

== Team members ==
TEAM KANO	TEAM GEESINK	TEAM VAN DE WALLE	TEAM DOUILLET	TEAM BERGHMANS
Melisa Çakmaklı (TUR); Gavin Mogopa (BOT); Mariam Janashvili (GEO); Stoyan Tarapanov (BUL); Tea Tintor (SRB); Arso Milic (MNE); Elvismar Rodríguez (VEN); Salim Farukhi (TJK)	Layana Colman (BRA); Nemanja Majdov (SRB); Dzmitry Minkou (BLR); Seunghwan Ryu (KOR); Ivana Sunjevic (MNE); Anastasya Turcheva (RUS); Yu-Jyun Wang (TPE)	Paola Acevedo (PUR); Leyla Aliyeva (AZE); Nokutula Banda (ZAM); Marco Montoya (COL); Ivan Felipe Silva (CUB); Unelle Snyman (RSA); Petar Zadro (BIH)	Gustavo Basile (ARG); Marko Bubanja (AUT); Adonis Diaz (USA); Liudmyla Drozdova (UKR); Lee Hye-kyeong (KOR); Brigita Matic (CRO); Peter Miles (GBR)	Pamela Paula Quizhpi (ECU); Edlene Mondelly (HAI); Wu Zhiqiang (CHN); Adela Szarzecova (CZE); Anri Egutidze (POR); Michaela Polleres (AUT); Domenik Schönefeldt (GER)
TEAM NEVZOROV	TEAM TANI	TEAM YAMASHITA	TEAM RUSKA	TEAM XIAN
Mihanta Andriamifehy (MAD); Brigitte Carabalí (COL); Nicolas Grinda (MON); Bryan Jolly (AUS); Tamazi Kirakozashvili (GEO); Salim Rebahi (ALG); Aleksandra Samardzic (BIH)	Khulan Tseregbaatar (MGL); Natig Gurbanli (AZE); Ulyana Minenkova (BLR); Luis Gonzalez (VEN); Hassiatou Yahaya Aboubacar (NIG); Francesco Aufieri (MLT); Rostislav Dashkov (KGZ)	Frank de Wit (NED); Nellie Einstein (SWE); Sandrine Mbazoghe Endamne (GAB); Lubjana Piovesana (GBR); Sara Rodriguez (ESP); Tsogtbaata Tsend-ochir (MGL); Jorre Verstraeten (BEL)	Sadjia Amrane (ALG); Harutyun Dermishyan (ARM); Betina Temelkova (BUL); Julian Sancho (CRC); Szabina Gercsák (HUN); Lovro Kovac (CRO); Kamila Pasternak (POL); Jose Basile (BRA)	Hifumi Abe (JPN); Chiara Carminucci (ITA); Naomi de Bruine (AUS); Jolan Florimont (FRA); Brillith Gamarra (PER); Felix Penning (LUX); Idan Vardi (ISR)
TEAM ROUGÉ	TEAM KERR	TEAM CHOCHISHVILI		
Morgane Duchene (FRA); Ayelén Elizeche (ARG); Adrian Gandia (PUR); Mikhail Igolnikov (RUS); Lisa Mullenberg (NED); Maria Siderot (POR); Sukhrob Tursunov (UZB)	Bauyrzhan Zhauyntayev (KAZ); Karla Lorenzana (GUA); Pawel Wawrzyczek (POL); Jennifer Schwille (GER); Saliou Ndiaye (SEN); Sophie Berger (BEL); Oussama Snoussi (TUN)	Stefania Adelina Dobre (ROU); Fatim Fofana (CIV); Bogdan Iadov (UKR); Louis Krieber-gagnon (CAN); Liu Xiaoyu (CHN); Yu-Hsuan Lo (TPE); Marton Sarecz (HUN); Estefania Soriano (DOM)		

== Results ==
Round of 16
TEAM BERGHMANS	4
TEAM KERR	2
TEAM XIAN	7
TEAM TANI	0
TEAM KANO	2
TEAM ROUGÉ	5
TEAM CHOCHISHVILI	3
TEAM GEESINK	4
TEAM YAMASHITA	3^{1}
TEAM DOUILLET	3^{2}

Quarterfinals
TEAM BERGHMANS	3
TEAM XIAN	4
TEAM ROUGÉ	5
TEAM RUSKA	2
TEAM VAN DE WALLE	3
TEAM GEESINK	4
TEAM NEVZOROV	2
TEAM DOUILLET	5

Semifinals
TEAM XIAN	3
TEAM ROUGÉ	4
TEAM GEESINK	3^{2}
TEAM DOUILLET	3^{1}

Finals
TEAM ROUGÉ	4
TEAM GEESINK	2
