= Austria at the 2014 Summer Youth Olympics =

- IOC code: AUT
- NOC: Austrian Olympic Committee
- Website: www.olympia.at

in Nanjing
- Competitors: 33 in 15 sports
- Flag bearer: Dominik Hufnagl
- Medals Ranked 47th: Gold 1 Silver 0 Bronze 1 Total 2

Summer Youth Olympics appearances (overview)
- 2010; 2014; 2018

Austria competed at the 2014 Summer Youth Olympics, in Nanjing, China from 16 August to 28 August 2014.

== Medalists ==
Medals awarded to participants of mixed-NOC (Combined) teams are represented in italics. These medals are not counted towards the individual NOC medal tally.

Medal	Name	Sport	Event	Date
Gold	Nadine Weratschnig	Canoeing	Girls' C1 slalom	27 August
Bronze	Michaela Polleres	Judo	Girls' -63 kg	18 August
Bronze	Marko Bubanja	Judo	Mixed Team	21 August

== Athletics ==
Austria qualified three athletes.

Qualification Legend: Q=Final A (medal); qB=Final B (non-medal); qC=Final C (non-medal); qD=Final D (non-medal); qE=Final E (non-medal)

Boys
Track & road events

Athlete	Event	Heats		Final	
Athlete	Event	Result	Rank	Result	Rank
Dominik Hufnagl	400 m hurdles	52.34	5 Q	52.95	7

Field Events

Athlete	Event	Qualification		Final	
Athlete	Event	Distance	Rank	Distance	Rank
Philip Kronsteiner	Triple jump	14.89	11 qB	15.18 PB	1

Girls
Track & road events

Athlete	Event	Heats		Final	
Athlete	Event	Result	Rank	Result	Rank
Ina Huemer	200 m	24.74	8 Q	24.74	7

== Badminton ==
Austria qualified two athletes based on the 2 May 2014 BWF Junior World Rankings.

Singles

Athlete	Event	Group stage				Quarterfinal	Semifinal	Final / BM	Rank
Athlete	Event	Opposition Score	Opposition Score	Opposition Score	Rank	Opposition Score	Opposition Score	Opposition Score	Rank
Wolfgang Gnedt	Boys' Singles	Shishkov (BUL); W 2-1	Guda (AUS); L 1-2	Lee (HKG); L 0-2	3	did not advance			
Janine Lais	Girls' Singles	Lee (MAS); L 0-2	He (CHN); L 1-2	Beton (SLO); L 1-2	4	did not advance			

Doubles

Athlete	Event	Group stage				Quarterfinal	Semifinal	Final / BM	Rank
Athlete	Event	Opposition Score	Opposition Score	Opposition Score	Rank	Opposition Score	Opposition Score	Opposition Score	Rank
Sabrina Solis (MEX); Wolfgang Gnedt (AUT)	Mixed Doubles	Cheam (MAS); Ng (HKG); L 0-2	Lin (CHN); Kim (KOR); L 0-2	Citron (FRA); Macias (PER); W 2-1	3	did not advance			
Janine Lais (AUT); Alex Vlaar (NED)	Mixed Doubles	Coelho (BRA); Lesnaya (UKR); W 2-0	Shi (CHN); Lai (AUS); L 0-2	Seo (KOR); Doha (EGY); L 0-2	4	did not advance			

== Beach volleyball ==
Austria qualified two teams by being the highest ranked nation not yet qualified.

Athletes	Event	Preliminary round	Standing	Round of 24	Round of 16	Quarterfinals	Semifinals	Final / BM	Rank
Athletes	Event	Opposition Score	Standing	Opposition Score	Opposition Score	Opposition Score	Opposition Score	Opposition Score	Rank
Johannes Kratz; Moritz Pristauz-Telsnigg	Boys'	Ndagano/Ndayisabye (RWA)	Q	Al Hammadi/Al Sahi (OMA); W 2 - 0	Rudolf/Stadie (GER); L 0 - 2	Did not advance			17
Johannes Kratz; Moritz Pristauz-Telsnigg	Boys'	Ashfiya/Licardo (INA); L 0 – 2	Q	Al Hammadi/Al Sahi (OMA); W 2 - 0	Rudolf/Stadie (GER); L 0 - 2	Did not advance			17
Johannes Kratz; Moritz Pristauz-Telsnigg	Boys'	DeFalco/Richard (USA); W 2 – 0	Q	Al Hammadi/Al Sahi (OMA); W 2 - 0	Rudolf/Stadie (GER); L 0 - 2	Did not advance			17
Johannes Kratz; Moritz Pristauz-Telsnigg	Boys'	Gomez/Hernandez (VEN)	Q	Al Hammadi/Al Sahi (OMA); W 2 - 0	Rudolf/Stadie (GER); L 0 - 2	Did not advance			17
Johannes Kratz; Moritz Pristauz-Telsnigg	Boys'	Kmiecik/Macura (POL)	Q	Al Hammadi/Al Sahi (OMA); W 2 - 0	Rudolf/Stadie (GER); L 0 - 2	Did not advance			17
Mona Gesslbauer; Julia Radl	Girls'	Douduwa/Essumang (GHA); W 2 – 0	2 Q	Bell/Kendall (AUS); W 2 – 0	Fortunati/Rotti (URU); W 2 – 0	Makroguzova/Rugykh (RUS); L 1 - 2	Did not advance		9
Mona Gesslbauer; Julia Radl	Girls'	Placette/Richard (FRA)	2 Q	Bell/Kendall (AUS); W 2 – 0	Fortunati/Rotti (URU); W 2 – 0	Makroguzova/Rugykh (RUS); L 1 - 2	Did not advance		9
Mona Gesslbauer; Julia Radl	Girls'	Bethancourt/Giron (GUA)	2 Q	Bell/Kendall (AUS); W 2 – 0	Fortunati/Rotti (URU); W 2 – 0	Makroguzova/Rugykh (RUS); L 1 - 2	Did not advance		9
Mona Gesslbauer; Julia Radl	Girls'	Kawfong/Tangkaeo (THA); W 2 – 0	2 Q	Bell/Kendall (AUS); W 2 – 0	Fortunati/Rotti (URU); W 2 – 0	Makroguzova/Rugykh (RUS); L 1 - 2	Did not advance		9
Mona Gesslbauer; Julia Radl	Girls'	Bobadilla/Valiente (PAR); W 2 – 1	2 Q	Bell/Kendall (AUS); W 2 – 0	Fortunati/Rotti (URU); W 2 – 0	Makroguzova/Rugykh (RUS); L 1 - 2	Did not advance		9

== Canoeing ==
Austria qualified one athlete based on its performance at the 2013 World Junior Canoe Sprint and Slalom Championships.

Girls

Athlete	Event	Qualification		Repechage		Round of 16		Quarterfinals	Semifinals	Final / BM	Rank
Athlete	Event	Time	Rank	Time	Rank	Time	Rank	Opposition Result	Opposition Result	Opposition Result	Rank
Nadine Weratschnig	Girls' C1 slalom	1:24.745	1 Q	—				Prioux (FRA); W 1:25.240	Ohmayer (GER); W 1:23.868	Satkova (CZE); W 1:25.659	1st place, gold medalist(s)
Nadine Weratschnig	Girls' C1 sprint	2:45.548	7 R	2:44.237	2 Q	—		Luzan (UKR); L 2:43.536	Did not advance		7

== Cycling ==
Austria qualified a boys' and girls' team based on its ranking issued by the UCI.

Team

Athletes	Event	Cross-Country Eliminator		Time Trial			BMX		Cross-Country Race			Road Race			Total Pts	Rank
Athletes	Event	Rank	Points	Time	Rank	Points	Rank	Points	Time	Rank	Points	Time	Rank	Points	Total Pts	Rank
Felix Ritzinger; Tobias Franek	Boys' Team	25	0	5:13.30	5	40	5	80	56:38	4	50	1:37:23; DNF	14 -	3	173	9
Melanie Amman; Nadja Heigl	Girls' Team	9	15	6:19.04	17	0	9	30	49:26	14	3	1:12:36; 1:12:36	14; 29	3	51	22

Mixed Relay

Athletes	Event	Cross-Country Girls' Race	Cross-Country Boys' Race	Boys' Road Race	Girls' Road Race	Total Time	Rank
Nadja Heigl; Tobias Franek; Felix Ritzinger; Melanie Amann	Mixed Team Relay					18:22	11

== Golf ==
Austria qualified one team of two athletes based on the 8 June 2014 IGF Combined World Amateur Golf Rankings.

Individual

Athlete	Event	Round 1		Round 2			Round 3			Total	
Athlete	Event	Score	Rank	Score	Total	Rank	Score	Total	Rank	Score	Rank
Johannes Schwab	Boys	100	32	93	193		88	281		281	32
Lea Zeitler	Girls	79	=26	76	155		75	230		230	25

Team

Athletes	Event	Round 1 (Foursome)		Round 2 (Fourball)			Round 3 (Individual Stroke)				Total	
Athletes	Event	Score	Rank	Score	Total	Rank	Boy	Girl	Total	Rank	Score	Rank
Johannes Schwab; Lea Zeitler	Mixed	71	=23	75	146		95	72	313		313	29

== Gymnastics ==
=== Artistic Gymnastics ===
Austria qualified one athlete based on its performance at the 2014 European MAG Championships and another athlete based on its performance at the 2014 European WAG Championships.

Boys

Athlete	Event	Apparatus						Total	Rank
Athlete	Event	F	PH	R	V	PB	HB	Total	Rank
Johannes Mairoser	Qualification	11.650	11.050	12.800	13.300	12.900	12.850	74.550	25

Girls

Athlete	Event	Apparatus				Total	Rank
Athlete	Event	F	V	UB	BB	Total	Rank
Ceyda Sirbu	Qualification	11.800	13.150	8.825	11.800	45.575	31

== Judo ==
Austria qualified two athletes based on its performance at the 2013 Cadet World Judo Championships.

Individual

Athlete	Event	Round of 32	Round of 16	Quarterfinals	Semifinals	Rep 1	Rep 2	Rep 3	Rep 4	Final / BM	Rank
Athlete	Event	Opposition Result	Opposition Result	Opposition Result	Opposition Result	Opposition Result	Opposition Result	Opposition Result	Opposition Result	Opposition Result	Rank
Marko Bubanja	Boys' -81 kg	—	Egutidze (POR); W 100-000	Kirakozashvili (GEO); L 010-011	Did not advance	—		Penning (LUX); W 101-000	Felipe (CUB); L 000-000	Did not advance	7
Michaela Polleres	Girls' -63 kg	—	Fofana (CIV); W 100-000	Mullenberg (NED); L 000-100	Did not advance	—		Banda (ZAM); W 100-000	Carabalí (COL); W 011-000	Klimkait (CAN); W 000-000	3rd place, bronze medalist(s)

Team

Athletes	Event	Round of 16	Quarterfinals	Semifinals	Final	Rank
Athletes	Event	Opposition Result	Opposition Result	Opposition Result	Opposition Result	Rank
Team Douillet; Gustavo Basile (ARG); Marko Bubanja (AUT); Adonis Diaz (USA); Liudmyla Drozdova (UKR); Lee Hye-kyeong (KOR); Brigita Matic (CRO); Peter Miles (GBR)	Mixed Team	Team Yamashita (MIX); W 3^{200} – 3^{112}	Team Nevzorov (MIX); W 5 – 2	Team Geesink (MIX); L 3^{111} – 3^{202}	Did not advance	3rd place, bronze medalist(s)
Team Berghmans; Anri Egutidze (POR); Edlene Mondelly (HAI); Michaela Polleres (AUT); Pamela Quizhpi (ECU); Domenik Schonefeldt (GER); Adela Szarzecova (CZE); Wu Zhiqiang (CHN)	Mixed Team	Team Kerr (MIX); W 4 – 3	Team Xian (MIX); L 3 – 4	Did not advance		5

== Modern Pentathlon ==
Austria qualified one athlete based on its performance at the 2014 Youth A World Championships.

Athlete	Event	Fencing (épée one touch)			Swimming (200 m freestyle)			Combined: shooting/running (10 m air pistol)/(3000 m)			Total points	Final rank
Athlete	Event	Results	Rank	Points	Time	Rank	Points	Time	Rank	Points	Total points	Final rank
Gustav Gustenau	Boys' Individual					7	326				1126	6
Gustav Gustenau (AUT); Valerya Uvarova (KGZ)	Mixed Relay	0 – 1	18	252	2:03.41	14	330	13:03.85	21	517	1099	21

== Rowing ==
Austria qualified one boat based on its performance at the 2013 World Rowing Junior Championships.

Athlete	Event	Heats		Repechage		Final	
Athlete	Event	Time	Rank	Time	Rank	Time	Rank
Ferdinand Querfeld; Christoph Seifriedsberger	Boys' Pairs	3:13.20	2	3:13.66	2 FA	3:15.73	6

Qualification Legend: FA=Final A (medal); FB=Final B (non-medal); FC=Final C (non-medal); FD=Final D (non-medal); SA/B=Semifinals A/B; SC/D=Semifinals C/D; R=Repechage

== Shooting ==
Austria qualified one shooter base on its performance at the 2014 European Shooting Championships.

Individual

Athlete	Event	Qualification		Final	
Athlete	Event	Points	Rank	Points	Rank
Rebecca Köck	Girls' 10m Air Rifle	410.4	9	Did not advance	

Team

Athletes	Event	Qualification		Round of 16	Quarterfinals	Semifinals	Final / BM	Rank
Athletes	Event	Points	Rank	Opposition Result	Opposition Result	Opposition Result	Opposition Result	Rank
Rebecca Köck (AUT); Abdullah Alsunaidi (QAT)	Mixed Team 10m Air Rifle							

== Swimming ==
Austria qualified four swimmers.

Boys

Athlete	Event	Heat		Semifinal		Final	
Athlete	Event	Time	Rank	Time	Rank	Time	Rank
Sebastian Steffan	200 m freestyle	—					
Sebastian Steffan	400 m freestyle	4:03.34	26	—		Did not advance	
Sebastian Steffan	200 m individual medley	2:04.31	7 Q	—		2:04.61	8
Sascha Subarsky	50 m butterfly	24.95	13 Q	25.10	15	Did not advance	
Sascha Subarsky	100 m butterfly	54.86	9 Q	54.00	7 Q	54.44	8

Girls

Athlete	Event	Heat		Semifinal		Final	
Athlete	Event	Time	Rank	Time	Rank	Time	Rank
Lena Kreundl	50 m freestyle	26.31	11 Q	25.96	9	Did not advance	
Lena Kreundl	100 m freestyle	56.32	10 Q	56.16	11	Did not advance	
Lena Kreundl	50 m backstroke	30.10	23	Did not advance			
Lena Kreundl	50 m butterfly	27.34	10 Q	27.21	11	Did not advance	
Claudia Hufnagl	200 m freestyle	2:02.49	12	—		Did not advance	
Claudia Hufnagl	400 m freestyle	4:15.95	8 Q	—		4:18.26	8
Claudia Hufnagl	100 m butterfly	1:02.04	16 Q	1:02.87	16	Did not advance	
Claudia Hufnagl	200 m butterfly	2:15.11	10	—		Did not advance	

== Table Tennis ==
Austria qualified two athlete based on its performance at the Road to Nanjing series.

Singles

Athlete	Event	Group stage	Rank	Round of 16	Quarterfinals	Semifinals	Final / BM	Rank
Athlete	Event	Opposition Score	Rank	Opposition Score	Opposition Score	Opposition Score	Opposition Score	Rank
Andreas Levenko	Boys	Group F Reitspies (CZE); L 1 - 3	3 qB	Consolation; Johnson (SKN); W 3 - 0 (W/O)	Consolation; Yadav (IND); L 1 - 3	Did not advance		21
Andreas Levenko	Boys	Ben Yahia (TUN); W 3 - 2	3 qB	Consolation; Johnson (SKN); W 3 - 0 (W/O)	Consolation; Yadav (IND); L 1 - 3	Did not advance		21
Andreas Levenko	Boys	Zatowka (POL); L 2 - 3	3 qB	Consolation; Johnson (SKN); W 3 - 0 (W/O)	Consolation; Yadav (IND); L 1 - 3	Did not advance		21
Karoline Mischek	Girls	Group F Rakovac (CRO); W 3 - 1	2 Q	Diaconu (ROU); L 0 - 4	Did not advance			9
Karoline Mischek	Girls	Edghill (GUY); W 3 - 0	2 Q	Diaconu (ROU); L 0 - 4	Did not advance			9
Karoline Mischek	Girls	Bajor (POL); L 1 - 3	2 Q	Diaconu (ROU); L 0 - 4	Did not advance			9

Team

Athletes	Event	Group stage	Rank	Round of 16	Quarterfinals	Semifinals	Final / BM	Rank
Athletes	Event	Opposition Score	Rank	Opposition Score	Opposition Score	Opposition Score	Opposition Score	Rank
Austria; Karoline Mischek (AUT); Andreas Levenko (AUT)	Mixed	Croatia; Rakovac (CRO); Pucar (CRO); L 0 - 3	3 qB	Consolation; Africa 3 Salah (DJI); Alassani (TOG); W 2 - 0	Consolation; Hungary; Imre (HUN); Szudi (HUN); L 0 - 2	—		21
Austria; Karoline Mischek (AUT); Andreas Levenko (AUT)	Mixed	Latin America 3 Edghill (GUY); Toranzos (PAR); W 3 - 0	3 qB	Consolation; Africa 3 Salah (DJI); Alassani (TOG); W 2 - 0	Consolation; Hungary; Imre (HUN); Szudi (HUN); L 0 - 2	—		21
Austria; Karoline Mischek (AUT); Andreas Levenko (AUT)	Mixed	Thailand; Khetkhuan (THA); Tanviriyavechakul (THA); L 0 - 3	3 qB	Consolation; Africa 3 Salah (DJI); Alassani (TOG); W 2 - 0	Consolation; Hungary; Imre (HUN); Szudi (HUN); L 0 - 2	—		21

Qualification Legend: Q=Main Bracket (medal); qB=Consolation Bracket (non-medal)

== Taekwondo ==
Austria qualified one athlete based on its performance at the Taekwondo Qualification Tournament.

Boys

Athlete	Event	Round of 16	Quarterfinals	Semifinals	Final	Rank
Athlete	Event	Opposition Result	Opposition Result	Opposition Result	Opposition Result	Rank
Eduard Frankford	−63 kg	Bye	Pontes (BRA); L 4 - 16 (PTG)	Did not advance		5

== Triathlon ==
Austria qualified two athletes based on its performance at the 2014 European Youth Olympic Games Qualifier.

Individual

Athlete	Event	Swim (750m)	Trans 1	Bike (20 km)	Trans 2	Run (5 km)	Total Time	Rank
Philip Horwarth	Boys	09:24	00:41	32:51	00:24	16:43	1:00:03	23
Sara Skardelly	Girls	11:10	00:45	32:43	00:30	17:53	1:03:01	12

Relay

Athlete	Event	Total Times per Athlete (Swim 250m, Bike 6.6 km, Run 1.8 km)	Total Group Time	Rank
Europe 5 Sara Skardelly (AUT); Romain Loop (BEL); Flora Bicsak (HUN); Dmitry Efimov (RUS)	Mixed Relay	22:33; 20:42; 23:20; 20:11	1:26:46	9
World Team 1 Jessica Romero Tinoco (MEX); Victor Manuel Herrera de la Hoz (CUB); Sofiya Pryyma (UKR); Philip Horwarth (AUT)	Mixed Relay	23:58; 21:07; 23:07; 20:52	1:29:04	10
