= Judo at the 2014 Summer Youth Olympics – Boys' 81 kg =

Judo competition

Boys' 81 kg at the II Summer Youth Olympic Games
- Venue: Longjiang Gymnasium
- Date: August 18
- Competitors: 21 from 21 nations

Medalists
| 1st place, gold medalist(s) | | Mikhail Igolnikov | Russia |
| 2nd place, silver medalist(s) | | Tamazi Kirakozashvili | Georgia |
| 3rd place, bronze medalist(s) | | Frank de Wit | Netherlands |
| 3rd place, bronze medalist(s) | | Iván Felipe Silva | Cuba |

The Boys' 81 kg tournament in Judo at the 2014 Summer Youth Olympics was held on August 18 at the Longjiang Gymnasium.

This event was the second-heaviest of the boys' judo weight classes, limiting competitors to a maximum of 81 kilograms of body mass. The tournament bracket consisted of a single-elimination contest culminating in a gold medal match. There was also a repechage to determine the winners of the two bronze medals. Each judoka who had lost before the finals competed in the repechage with the two finalists getting bronze medals.

== Results ==
=== Main Bracket ===
Round of 32
Oussama Snoussi (TUN) | 100
Salim Farukhi (TJK) | 000
Nicolas Grinda (MON) | 010
Jose Basile (BRA) | 110
Saliou Ndiaye (SEN) | 000
Yu-Hsuan Lo (TPE) | 100
Lovro Kovač (CRO) | 000
Marco Montoya (COL) | 000
Idan Vardi (ISR) | 111
Felix Penning (LUX) | 000

Round of 16
Louis Krieber-Gagnon (CAN) | 100
Oussama Snoussi (TUN) | 0
Nemanja Majdov (SRB) | 110
Francesco Aufieri (MLT) | 000
Arso Milić (MNE) | 010
Mattias Kuusik (EST) | 000
Mikhail Igolnikov (RUS) | 102
Jose Basile (BRA) | 000
Frank de Wit (NED) | 100
Yu-Hsuan Lo (TPE) | 000
Iván Felipe Silva (CUB) | 100
Lovro Kovač (CRO) | 000
Tamazi Kirakozashvili (GEO) | 100
Idan Vardi (ISR) | 000
Marko Bubanja (AUT) | 100
Anri Egutidze (POR) | 000

Quarterfinals
Louis Krieber-Gagnon (CAN) | 000
Nemanja Majdov (SRB) | 002
Arso Milić (MNE) | 000
Mikhail Igolnikov (RUS) | 100
Frank de Wit (NED) | 010
Iván Felipe Silva (CUB) | 001
Tamazi Kirakozashvili (GEO) | 011
Marko Bubanja (AUT) | 010

Semifinals
Nemanja Majdov (SRB) | 000
Mikhail Igolnikov (RUS) | 100
Frank de Wit (NED) | 000
Tamazi Kirakozashvili (GEO) | 100

Finals
Mikhail Igolnikov (RUS) | 000
Tamazi Kirakozashvili (GEO) | 000

=== Repechage ===
| Repechage 1 | | Repechage 2 |
| Bye |
| Oussama Snoussi (TUN) | | Oussama Snoussi (TUN) | 100 |
| Nicolas Grinda (MON) | 100 | Nicolas Grinda (MON) | 000 |
| Francesco Aufieri (MLT) | 000 |
| Salim Farukhi (TJK) | 101 |
| Mattias Kuusik (EST) | 000 | Salim Farukhi (TJK) | 100 |
| Bye | | Jose Basile (BRA) | 010 |
| Jose Basile (BRA) |
| Felix Penning (LUX) | 100 |
| Yu-Hsuan Lo (TPE) | 010 | Felix Penning (LUX) | 100 |
| Bye | | Lovro Kovač (CRO) | 000 |
| Lovro Kovač (CRO) |
| Saliou Ndiaye (SEN) | 100 |
| Idan Vardi (ISR) | 000 | Saliou Ndiaye (SEN) | 000 |
| Marco Montoya (COL) | 000 | Anri Egutidze (POR) | 100 |
| Anri Egutidze (POR) | 100 |

Repechage 3
Oussama Snoussi (TUN) | 000
Arso Milić (MNE) | 000
Salim Farukhi (TJK) | 000
Louis Krieber-Gagnon (CAN) | 100
Felix Penning (LUX) | 000
Marko Bubanja (AUT) | 101
Anri Egutidze (POR) | 000
Iván Felipe Silva (CUB) | 101

Repechage 4
Arso Milić (MNE) | 100
Louis Krieber-Gagnon (CAN) | 000
Marko Bubanja (AUT) | 000
Iván Felipe Silva (CUB) | 000

Bronze Medal Finals
Arso Milić (MNE) | 000
Frank de Wit (NED) | 100
Iván Felipe Silva (CUB) | 010
Nemanja Majdov (SRB) | 000
