= Georgia at the 2014 Summer Youth Olympics =

- Flag of Georgia
- IOC code: GEO
- NOC: Georgian National Olympic Committee
- Website: www.geonoc.org.ge

in Nanjing
- Competitors: 12 in 7 sports
- Medals Ranked 58th: Gold 0 Silver 2 Bronze 1 Total 3

Summer Youth Olympics appearances
- 2010; 2014; 2018

Georgia competed at the 2014 Summer Youth Olympics, in Nanjing, China from 16 August to 28 August 2014.

== Medalists ==
Medal	Name	Sport	Event	Date
Silver	Tamazi Kirakozashvili	Judo	Boys' -81 kg	18 August
Silver	Meki Simonia	Wrestling	Boys' Freestyle -76kg	27 August
Bronze	Iveriko Julakidze	Wrestling	Boys' Freestyle -63kg	27 August

== Athletics ==
Georgia qualified four athletes.

Qualification Legend: Q=Final A (medal); qB=Final B (non-medal); qC=Final C (non-medal); qD=Final D (non-medal); qE=Final E (non-medal)

Boys
Field Events

Athlete	Event	Qualification		Final	
Athlete	Event	Distance	Rank	Distance	Rank
Goga Maglakelidze	Triple jump	15.07 PB	9 Q	14.82	7
Giorgi Mujaridze	Shot put	17.57	10 qB	17.90	2
Giorgi Oniani	Hammer throw	59.86	15 qB	64.92	5

Girls
Field events

Athlete	Event	Qualification		Final	
Athlete	Event	Distance	Position	Distance	Position
Mari Dzagnidze	Long jump	5.90	4 Q	5.87	7

== Boxing ==
Georgia qualified one boxer based on its performance at the 2014 AIBA Youth World Championships

Boys

Athlete	Event	Preliminaries	Semifinals	Final / RM	Rank
Athlete	Event	Opposition Result	Opposition Result	Opposition Result	Rank
Giorgi Kharabadze	-69 kg	Vincenzo (ITA); L 1-2	Did not advance	Bout for 5th place Prtenjača (CRO)	—N/a

== Fencing ==
Georgia qualified one athlete based on its performance at the 2014 FIE Cadet World Championships.

Boys

Athlete	Event	Pool Round	Seed	Round of 16	Quarterfinals	Semifinals	Final / BM	Rank
Athlete	Event	Opposition Score	Seed	Opposition Score	Opposition Score	Opposition Score	Opposition Score	Rank
Nika Shengelia	Sabre	22-25		Metryka (USA); W 15–13	Ilin (RUS); L 8–15	Did not advance		

Mixed Team

Athletes
Event
Round of 16
Quarterfinals
Semifinals / PM
Final / PM
Rank
Opposition
Score
Opposition
Score
Opposition
Score
Opposition
Score
Nika Shengelia

 Team Europe 3 (MIX)

Mixed Team
Team Asia-Oceania 2 (MIX)
L 26–30
Did not advance
7

== Gymnastics ==
=== Trampoline ===
Georgia qualified one athlete based on its performance at the 2014 European Trampoline Championships.

Athlete	Event	Qualification				Final	
Athlete	Event	Routine 1	Routine 2	Total	Rank	Score	Rank
Teona Janjgava	Girls	33.435	48.695	80.710	10	Did not advance	

== Judo ==
Georgia qualified two athletes based on its performance at the 2013 Cadet World Judo Championships.

Individual

Athlete	Event	Round of 32	Round of 16	Quarterfinals	Semifinals	Rep 1	Rep 2	Rep 3	Rep 4	Final / BM	Rank
Athlete	Event	Opposition Result	Opposition Result	Opposition Result	Opposition Result	Opposition Result	Opposition Result	Opposition Result	Opposition Result	Opposition Result	Rank
Tamazi Kirakozashvili	Boys' -81 kg	—N/a	Vardi (ISR); W 100S1-000S1	Bubanja (AUT); W 011-010	de Wit (NED); W 100-000	—N/a				Igolnikov (RUS); L 000S2-000	2nd place, silver medalist(s)
Mariam Janashvili	Girls' -52 kg	—N/a	Andriamifehy (MAD); W 100-000S4	Acevedo (PUR); W 100-000	Colman (BRA); L 000S2-000	—N/a				Hyekyeong (KOR); L 100-000	5

Team

Athletes	Event	Round of 16	Quarterfinals	Semifinals	Final	Rank
Athletes	Event	Opposition Result	Opposition Result	Opposition Result	Opposition Result	Rank
Team Nevzorov (MIX); Mihanta Andriamifehy (MAD); Brigitte Carabalí (COL); Nicolas Grinda (MON); Bryan Jolly (AUS); Tamazi Kirakozashvili (GEO); Salim Rebahi (ALG); Aleksandra Samardzic (BIH)	Mixed Team	—N/a	Team Douillet (MIX); L 2-5	Did not advance		5
Team Kano (MIX); Melisa Çakmaklı (TUR); Salim Darukhi (TJK); Mariam Janashvili (GEO); Arso Milic (MNE); Gavin Mogopa (BOT); Elvismar Rodriguez (VEN); Stoyan Tarapanov (BUL); Tea Tintor (SRB)	Mixed Team	Team Rouge (MIX); L 2-5	Did not advance			9

== Swimming ==
Georgia qualified one swimmer.

Boys

Athlete	Event	Heat		Final	
Athlete	Event	Time	Rank	Time	Rank
Akaki Vashakidze	200 m butterfly	2:04.51	14	Did not advance	

== Wrestling ==
Georgia qualified two athletes based on its performance at the 2014 European Cadet Championships.

Key:

- VT - Victory by Fall.
- PP - Decision by Points - the loser with technical points.
- PO - Decision by Points - the loser without technical points.

Boys

Athlete	Event	Group stage				Final / RM	Rank
Athlete	Event	Opposition Score	Opposition Score	Opposition Score	Rank	Opposition Score	Rank
Iveriko Julakidze	Freestyle -63kg	Mammadov (AZE); L 4-0 ^{ST}	Dydasco (PLW); W 4-1 ^{ST}	Steyn (RSA); W 3-0 ^{PO}	2 Q	Kumar (IND); W 3-1 ^{PP}	3rd place, bronze medalist(s)
Meki Simonia	Freestyle -76kg	Barray (TUN); W 4-0 ^{ST}	Izquierdo (COL); W 3-1 ^{PP}	Rivera (HON); W 4-1 ^{ST}	1 Q	Yamasaki (JPN); L 4-0 ^{ST}	2nd place, silver medalist(s)
