= Croatia at the 2014 Summer Youth Olympics =

- IOC code: CRO
- NOC: Croatian Olympic Committee
- Website: www.hoo.hr

in Nanjing
- Competitors: 24 in 13 sports
- Medals Ranked 22nd: Gold 3 Silver 1 Bronze 1 Total 5

Summer Youth Olympics appearances (overview)
- 2010; 2014; 2018

Croatia competed at the 2014 Summer Youth Olympics, in Nanjing, China from 16 August to 28 August 2014. Croatia had 24 athletes qualified in 13 sports.

== Medalists ==
Medals awarded to participants of mixed-NOC (Combined) teams are represented in italics. These medals are not counted towards the individual NOC medal tally.

Medal	Name	Sport	Event	Date
Gold	Brigita Matić	Judo	Girls' -78 kg	19 August
Gold	Ivana Babić	Taekwondo	Girls' −55 kg	19 August
Gold	Nikola Obrovac	Swimming	Boys' 50 m breaststroke	22 August
Silver	Toni Filipi	Boxing	Boys' Heavyweight	27 August
Bronze	Brigita Matić	Judo	Mixed Team	21 August
Bronze	Luka Plantić	Boxing	Boys' Middleweight	27 August

== Athletics ==
Croatia qualified one athlete.

Qualification Legend: Q=Final A (medal); qB=Final B (non-medal); qC=Final C (non-medal); qD=Final D (non-medal); qE=Final E (non-medal)

Girls
Field events

Athlete	Event	Qualification		Final	
Athlete	Event	Distance	Position	Distance	Position
Eva Mustafić	Hammer throw	56.73 PB FB	15 qB	NM	

== Badminton ==
Croatia qualified one athlete based on the Badminton Junior World Rankings.

Singles

Athlete	Event	Group stage				Quarterfinal	Semifinal	Final / BM	Rank
Athlete	Event	Opposition Score	Opposition Score	Opposition Score	Rank	Opposition Score	Opposition Score	Opposition Score	Rank
Maja Pavlinić	Girls' Singles	Lesnaya (UKR); W 2-0	Lee (TPE); L 0-2	Qin (CHN); L 0-2	3	did not advance			

Doubles

Athlete	Event	Group stage				Quarterfinal	Semifinal	Final / BM	Rank
Athlete	Event	Opposition Score	Opposition Score	Opposition Score	Rank	Opposition Score	Opposition Score	Opposition Score	Rank
Maja Pavlinić (CRO); Muhammed Ali Kurt (TUR)	Mixed Doubles	Shishkov (BUL); Heim (GER); W 2-0	Ginting (INA); Beton (SLO); L 0-2	Weisskirchen (GER); Ishaak (SUR); W 2-0	2	did not advance			

== Boxing ==
Croatia qualified three athletes based on its performance at the 2014 Youth World Boxing Championships.

Boys

Athlete	Event	Preliminaries	Semifinals	Final / RM	Rank
Athlete	Event	Opposition Result	Opposition Result	Opposition Result	Rank
Luka Prtenjača	Welterweight	Solano (DOM); L 0-3	Did not advance	Bout for 5th place Kharabadze (GEO)	—
Luka Plantić	Middleweight	Bye	Nesterov (RUS); L 0-3	Bronze medal Bout Mardonov (UZB); W 3-0	3rd place, bronze medalist(s)
Toni Filipi	Heavyweight	Bye	Kim (KOR); W 2-1	Hernandez (CUB); L 1-2	2nd place, silver medalist(s)

== Fencing ==
Croatia qualified one athlete at the 2014 World Cadet Championships.

Boys

Athlete	Event	Pool Round	Seed	Round of 16	Quarterfinals	Semifinals	Final / BM	Rank
Athlete	Event	Opposition Score	Seed	Opposition Score	Opposition Score	Opposition Score	Opposition Score	Rank
Petar Fileš	Foil	Marostega (BRA) Fitzgerald (AUS) Braun (GER) Haglund (USA); W 5-4; Roger (FRA)		Braun (GER); W 15-10				

Mixed Team

Athletes	Event	Round of 16	Quarterfinals	Semifinals / PM	Final / PM	Rank
Athletes	Event	Opposition Score	Opposition Score	Opposition Score	Opposition Score	Rank
Europe 4 Theodora Gkountoura (GRE); Claudia Borella (ITA); Inna Brovko (UKR); Tudor Cucu (ROU); Petar Files (CRO); Samuel Unterhauser (GER)	Team	Bye	Asia-Oceania 1 (MIX); L 22-30	America 1 (MIX); W 30-27	America 2 (MIX); L 28-30	6

== Gymnastics ==
=== Artistic Gymnastics ===
Croatia qualified one athlete based on its performance at the 2014 European MAG Championships.

Boys

Athlete	Event	Apparatus						Total	Rank
Athlete	Event	F	PH	R	V	PB	HB	Total	Rank
Jakov Vlahek	Qualification	12.875 23	13.650 7 Q	11.450 31	12.950 34	12.975 17	12.150 26	76.050	21
Jakov Vlahek	Pommel Horse	—						13.533	5

== Judo ==
Croatia qualified two athletes based on its performance at the 2013 Cadet World Judo Championships.

Individual

Athlete	Event	Round of 32	Round of 16	Quarterfinals	Semifinals	Rep 1	Rep 2	Rep 3	Rep 4	Final / BM	Rank
Athlete	Event	Opposition Result	Opposition Result	Opposition Result	Opposition Result	Opposition Result	Opposition Result	Opposition Result	Opposition Result	Opposition Result	Rank
Lovro Kovač	Boys' -81 kg	Montoya (COL); W 000-000	Silva (CUB); L 000-100	Did not advance		Bye	Penning (LUX); L 000-100	Did not advance			11
Brigita Matić	Girls' -78 kg	—		Rodríguez (VEN); W 001-000	Snyman (RSA); W 100-000	—				Samardzic (BIH); W 000-000	1st place, gold medalist(s)

Team

Athletes	Event	Round of 16	Quarterfinals	Semifinals	Final	Rank
Athletes	Event	Opposition Result	Opposition Result	Opposition Result	Opposition Result	Rank
Team Ruska; Sadjia Amrane (ALG); Jose Basile (BRA); Harutyun Dermishyan (ARM); Szabina Gercsák (HUN); Lovro Kovac (CRO); Kamila Pasternak (POL); Julian Sancho (CRC); Betina Temelkova (BUL)	Mixed Team	Bye	Team Rouge (MIX); L 2 – 5	Did not advance		5
Team Douillet; Gustavo Basile (ARG); Marko Bubanja (AUT); Adonis Diaz (USA); Liudmyla Drozdova (UKR); Lee Hye-kyeong (KOR); Brigita Matic (CRO); Peter Miles (GBR)	Mixed Team	Team Yamashita (MIX); W 3^{200} – 3^{112}	Team Nevzorov (MIX); W 5 – 2	Team Geesink (MIX); L 3^{111} – 3^{202}	Did not advance	3rd place, bronze medalist(s)

== Rowing ==
Croatia qualified two boats. The boys' pairs qualified from the 2013 World Rowing Junior Championships and the girls' single sculls was reallocated to Croatia as an unused quota.

Athlete	Event	Heats		Repechage		Semifinals		Final	
Athlete	Event	Time	Rank	Time	Rank	Time	Rank	Time	Rank
Ivo Bonacin; Bernard Samardžić	Boys' Pairs	3:13.94	3 R	3:15.24	2 FA	—		3:14.76	5
Marina Kaić	Girls' Single Sculls	3:57.25	5 R	3:53.88	2 SA/B	4:01.56	5 FB	4:05.06	12

Qualification Legend: FA=Final A (medal); FB=Final B (non-medal); FC=Final C (non-medal); FD=Final D (non-medal); SA/B=Semifinals A/B; SC/D=Semifinals C/D; R=Repechage

== Sailing ==
Croatia qualified one boat based on its performance at the 2013 World Byte CII Championships. Croatia also received a reallocated quota place in girls' Byte CII class.

Athlete	Event	Race											Net Points	Final Rank
Athlete	Event	1	2	3	4	5	6	7	8	9	10	M*	Net Points	Final Rank
Pavle Živanović	Boys' Byte CII	5	8	7	6	(21)	7	11	15	Cancelled		80.00	59.00	7
Karla Šavar	Girls' Byte CII	20	16	19	(23)	20	14	16	20	Cancelled		148.00	125.00	23

== Shooting ==
Croatia qualified two shooters based on its performance at the 2014 European Shooting Championships.

Individual

Athlete	Event	Qualification		Final	
Athlete	Event	Points	Rank	Points	Rank
Borna Petanjek	Boys' 10m Air Rifle	612.1	9	Did not advance	
Ivana Babić	Girls' 10m Air Rifle	410.9	8 Q	141.4	5

Team

Athletes	Event	Qualification		Round of 16	Quarterfinals	Semifinals	Final / BM	Rank
Athletes	Event	Points	Rank	Opposition Result	Opposition Result	Opposition Result	Opposition Result	Rank
Borna Petanjek (CRO); Ekaterina Parshukova (RUS)	Mixed Team 10m Air Rifle		7 Q	Babayan (ARM); Akter (BAN); L 7-10	Did not advance			17
Ivana Babic (CRO); Sybrand Laurens (RSA)	Mixed Team 10m Air Rifle	811.9	14 Q	Borgo (MEX); Alvian (INA); W 10–6	Riccardi (SMR); Milovanovic (SRB); L 6–10	Did not advance		5

== Swimming ==
Croatia qualified three swimmers.

Boys

Athlete	Event	Heat		Semifinal		Final	
Athlete	Event	Time	Rank	Time	Rank	Time	Rank
Sven Arnar Saemundsson	400 m freestyle	3:57.55	18	—		Did not advance	
Sven Arnar Saemundsson	800 m freestyle	—				8:06.72	8
Sven Arnar Saemundsson	200 m individual medley	2:08.97	18	—		Did not advance	
Nikola Obrovac	50 m breaststroke	27.97	1 Q	28.00	1 Q	27.83	1st place, gold medalist(s)
Nikola Obrovac	100 m breaststroke	1:02.49	4 Q	1:02.79	7 Q	1:01.94	5

Girls

Athlete	Event	Heat		Semifinal		Final	
Athlete	Event	Time	Rank	Time	Rank	Time	Rank
Ema Šarar	50 m freestyle	26.99	26	Did not advance			
Ema Šarar	50 m backstroke	29.89	18	Did not advance			
Ema Šarar	100 m backstroke	—					

== Table tennis ==
Croatia qualified one athlete based on its performance at the European Qualification Event. Later, Croatia qualified another athlete at the Road to Nanjing series.

Singles

Athlete	Event	Group stage	Rank	Round of 16	Quarterfinals	Semifinals	Final / BM	Rank
Athlete	Event	Opposition Score	Rank	Opposition Score	Opposition Score	Opposition Score	Opposition Score	Rank
Tomislav Pucar	Boys	Group H Hung (HKG); L 2 - 3	2 Q	Zatowka (POL); L 2 - 4	Did not advance			9
Tomislav Pucar	Boys	Schmid (SUI); W 3 - 1	2 Q	Zatowka (POL); L 2 - 4	Did not advance			9
Tomislav Pucar	Boys	Al-Naggar (QAT); W 3 - 0	2 Q	Zatowka (POL); L 2 - 4	Did not advance			9
Lea Rakovac	Girls	Group F Mischek (AUT); L 1 - 3	1 Q	Arvelo (VEN); W 4 - 1	Kato (JPN); L 1 - 4	Did not advance		5
Lea Rakovac	Girls	Bajor (POL); W 3 - 0	1 Q	Arvelo (VEN); W 4 - 1	Kato (JPN); L 1 - 4	Did not advance		5
Lea Rakovac	Girls	Edghill (GUY); W 3 - 0	1 Q	Arvelo (VEN); W 4 - 1	Kato (JPN); L 1 - 4	Did not advance		5

Team

Athletes	Event	Group stage	Rank	Round of 16	Quarterfinals	Semifinals	Final / BM	Rank
Athletes	Event	Opposition Score	Rank	Opposition Score	Opposition Score	Opposition Score	Opposition Score	Rank
Croatia; Lea Rakovac (CRO); Tomislav Pucar (CRO)	Mixed	Austria; Mischek (AUT); Levenko (AUT); W 3 - 0	2 Q	Europe 1 Diaconu (ROU); Chen (POR); W 2 - 0	Hong Kong; Doo (HKG); Hung (HKG); L 0 - 2	Did not advance		5
Croatia; Lea Rakovac (CRO); Tomislav Pucar (CRO)	Mixed	Thailand; Khetkhuan (THA); Tanviriyavechakul (THA); L 1 - 2	2 Q	Europe 1 Diaconu (ROU); Chen (POR); W 2 - 0	Hong Kong; Doo (HKG); Hung (HKG); L 0 - 2	Did not advance		5
Croatia; Lea Rakovac (CRO); Tomislav Pucar (CRO)	Mixed	Latin America 3 Edghill (GUY); Toranzos (PAR); W 3 - 0	2 Q	Europe 1 Diaconu (ROU); Chen (POR); W 2 - 0	Hong Kong; Doo (HKG); Hung (HKG); L 0 - 2	Did not advance		5

Qualification Legend: Q=Main Bracket (medal); qB=Consolation Bracket (non-medal)

== Taekwondo ==
Croatia qualified two athletes based on its performance at the Taekwondo Qualification Tournament.

Girls

Athlete	Event	Round of 16	Quarterfinals	Semifinals	Final	Rank
Athlete	Event	Opposition Result	Opposition Result	Opposition Result	Opposition Result	Rank
Ivana Babić	−55 kg	Bye	Mwaka Masale (COD); W 14 (PTG) - 1	Roebben (BEL); W 13 - 4	Sarıdoğan (TUR); W 1 - 0	1st place, gold medalist(s)
Matea Jelić	−63 kg	Tolba (EGY); W 14 - 5	Turutina (RUS); L 4 - 7	Did not advance		5

== Tennis ==
Croatia qualified one athlete based on the ITF ranking.

Singles

Athlete	Event	Round of 32	Round of 16	Quarterfinals	Semifinals	Final / BM	Rank
Athlete	Event	Opposition Score	Opposition Score	Opposition Score	Opposition Score	Opposition Score	Rank
Nino Serdarušić	Boys' Singles	Geens (BEL); L 0-2; 3-6, 2-6	Did not advance				17

Doubles

Athletes	Event	Round of 32	Round of 16	Quarterfinals	Semifinals	Final / BM	Rank
Athletes	Event	Opposition Score	Opposition Score	Opposition Score	Opposition Score	Opposition Score	Rank
Nino Serdarušić (CRO); Petros Chrysochos (CYP)	Boys' Doubles	—	Matsumura (JPN); Yamasaki (JPN); L 0-2; 3-6, 4-6	Did not advance			9
Akvile Parazinskaite (LTU); Nino Serdarušić (CRO)	Mixed Doubles	Minnen (BEL); Geens (BEL); L 1-2; 6-3, 3-6, [4]-[10]	Did not advance				17
