= Colombia at the 2014 Summer Youth Olympics =

- IOC code: COL
- NOC: Colombian Olympic Committee
- Website: www.olimpicocol.co (in Spanish)

in Nanjing
- Competitors: 34 in 12 sports
- Medals Ranked 46th: Gold 1 Silver 0 Bronze 2 Total 3

Summer Youth Olympics appearances (overview)
- 2010; 2014; 2018

Colombia competed at the 2014 Summer Youth Olympics, in Nanjing, China from 16 August to 28 August 2014.

== Medalists ==
Medal	Name	Sport	Event	Date
Gold	Brandon Rivera; Jhon Anderson Rodríguez	Cycling	Boys' Team	22 August
Bronze	Andrés Caicedo	Weightlifting	Boys' −69 kg	19 August
Bronze	Debbie Yopasa	Taekwondo	Girls' −63 kg	20 August

== Athletics ==
Colombia qualified 11 athletes.

Qualification Legend: Q=Final A (medal); qB=Final B (non-medal); qC=Final C (non-medal); qD=Final D (non-medal); qE=Final E (non-medal)

Boys
Track & road events

Athlete	Event	Heats		Final	
Athlete	Event	Result	Rank	Result	Rank
Sergio Becerra	100 m	11.09	14 q B	11.11	13
Harold Maturana	400 m	51.35	20 q C	50.30	17
Joshuán Berrios	110 m hurdles	13.66	8 Q	DQ	

Field Events

Athlete	Event	Qualification		Final	
Athlete	Event	Distance	Rank	Distance	Rank
Luis Ibarguen	Javelin throw	NM q B		49.92	7

Girls
Track & road events

Athlete	Event	Heats		Final	
Athlete	Event	Result	Rank	Result	Rank
Evelyn Rivera	100 m	12.20	13 q B	12.11	10
Astrid Balanta	400 m	57.23	15 q B	55.90	7
Margy Rivera	1500 m	4:39.54	15 q B	4:37.36	5
Dayana Ramos	100 m hurdles	14.92	19 q C	14.86	3

Field events

Athlete	Event	Qualification		Final	
Athlete	Event	Distance	Position	Distance	Position
Nhayilla Rentería	Triple jump	12.31	9 q B	12.29	1
Giseth Montaño	Pole vault	NM q B		DNS	
Mayra Gaviria	Hammer throw	60.27	10 q B	57.50	3

== Cycling ==
Colombia qualified a boys' and girls' team based on its ranking issued by the UCI.

Team

Athletes	Event	Cross-Country Eliminator		Time Trial			BMX		Cross-Country Race			Road Race			Total Pts	Rank
Athletes	Event	Rank	Points	Time	Rank	Points	Rank	Points	Time	Rank	Points	Time	Rank	Points	Total Pts	Rank
Brandon Rivera; Jhon Anderson Rodríguez	Boys' Team	2	80	5:11.36	3	65	8	40	55:17	2	80	1:39:04; 1:37:23	46; 11	8	273	1st place, gold medalist(s)
Andrea Escobar; Leidy Cadena	Girls' Team	17	0	6:27.46	20	0	3	130	48:30	9	15	1:27:52; 1:19:12	52; 39	0	145	6

Mixed Relay

Athletes	Event	Cross-Country Girls' Race	Cross-Country Boys' Race	Boys' Road Race	Girls' Road Race	Total Time	Rank
Andrea Escobar; Brandon Rivera; Jhon Anderson Rodríguez; Leidy Cadena	Mixed Team Relay	4:37	7:21	12:47	19:43	19:43	20

== Diving ==
Colombia qualified four quotas based on its performance at the Nanjing 2014 Diving Qualifying Event.

Athlete	Event	Preliminary		Final	
Athlete	Event	Points	Rank	Points	Rank
Kevin García	Boys' 3 m springboard	475.85	10	460.40	10
Kevin García	Boys' 10 m platform	474.50	4	495.15	4
Sara Pérez	Girls' 3 m springboard	328.35	12	345.80	12
Sara Pérez	Girls' 10 m platform	294.40	10	330.65	9
Molly Carlson (CAN); Kevin García (COL)	Mixed team	—N/a		323.25	6

== Gymnastics ==
=== Artistic Gymnastics ===
Colombia qualified two athletes based on its performance at the 2014 Junior Pan American Artistic Gymnastics Championships.

Boys

Athlete	Event	Apparatus						Total	Rank
Athlete	Event	F	PH	R	V	PB	HB	Total	Rank
Andrés Martínez	Qualification	13.650 13	11.550 29	12.425 26	13.900 20	12.650 20	13.500 5 Q	77.675	13 Q
Andrés Martínez	All-Around	13.850	11.100	10.300	14.100	12.050	13.375	74.750	16
Andrés Martínez	Horizontal Bar	—N/a						13.266	5

Girls

Athlete	Event	Apparatus				Total	Rank
Athlete	Event	V	UB	BB	F	Total	Rank
Laura Pardo	Qualification	13.750 9	10.650 22	9.800 37	11.400 28	45.600	30

== Judo ==
Colombia qualified two athletes based on its performance at the 2013 Cadet World Judo Championships.

Individual

Athlete	Event	Round of 32	Round of 16	Quarterfinals	Semifinals	Rep 1	Rep 2	Rep 3	Rep 4	Final / BM	Rank
Athlete	Event	Opposition Result	Opposition Result	Opposition Result	Opposition Result	Opposition Result	Opposition Result	Opposition Result	Opposition Result	Opposition Result	Rank
Marco Montoya	Boys' -81 kg	Kovac (CRO); L 000-000	Did not advance			Egutidze (POR); L 000-100	Did not advance				17
Brigitte Carabalí	Girls' -63 kg	—N/a	Carminucci (ITA); W 001-000	Gercsák (HUN); L 000-100	Did not advance	—N/a		Fofana (CIV); W 010-000	Polleres (AUT); L 000-011	Did not advance	11

Team

Athletes	Event	Round of 16	Quarterfinals	Semifinals	Final	Rank
Athletes	Event	Opposition Result	Opposition Result	Opposition Result	Opposition Result	Rank
Team Van De Walle; Paola Acevedo (PUR); Leyla Aliyeva (AZE); Nokutula Banda (ZAM); Marco Montoya (COL); Iván Felipe Silva Morales (CUB); Unelle Snyman (RSA); Peta Zadro (BIH)	Mixed Team	Bye	Team Geesink (MIX); L 3 – 4	Did not advance		5
Team Nevzorov; Mihanta Andriamifehy (MAD); Brigitte Carabalí (COL); Nicolas Grinda (MON); Bryan Jolly (AUS); Tamazi Kirakozashvili (GEO); Salim Rebahi (ALG); Aleksandra Samardžić (BIH)	Mixed Team	Bye	Team Douillet (MIX); L 2 – 5	Did not advance		5

== Shooting ==
Colombia was given a wild card to compete.

Individual

Athlete	Event	Qualification		Final	
Athlete	Event	Points	Rank	Points	Rank
Juan Sebastián Rivera	Boys' 10m Air Pistol	527	19	did not advance	

Team

Athletes	Event	Qualification		Round of 16	Quarterfinals	Semifinals	Final / BM	Rank
Athletes	Event	Points	Rank	Opposition Result	Opposition Result	Opposition Result	Opposition Result	Rank
Juan Sebastián Rivera (COL); Margarita Chernousova (RUS)	Mixed Team 10m Air Pistol		10 Q	Aric (MDA)- Konarieva (UKR); L 9-10	did not advance			17

== Swimming ==
Colombia qualified one swimmer.

Boys

Athlete	Event	Heat		Semifinal		Final	
Athlete	Event	Time	Rank	Time	Rank	Time	Rank
Jonathan Gómez	100 m butterfly	56.53	21	Did not advance			
Jonathan Gómez	200 m butterfly	2:01.94	8 Q	—N/a		2:02.83	8

== Taekwondo ==
Colombia qualified two athletes based on its performance at the Taekwondo Qualification Tournament.

Boys

Athlete	Event	Round of 16	Quarterfinals	Semifinals	Final	Rank
Athlete	Event	Opposition Result	Opposition Result	Opposition Result	Opposition Result	Rank
Jeisson Serrano	−73 kg	—N/a	Guliyev (AZE); L 4 - 7	Did not advance		5

Girls

Athlete	Event	Round of 16	Quarterfinals	Semifinals	Final	Rank
Athlete	Event	Opposition Result	Opposition Result	Opposition Result	Opposition Result	Rank
Debbie Yopasa	−63 kg	Bye	Mariappen (MAS); W 15 (PTG) - 1	Alizadeh (IRI); L 2 - 12	Did not advance	3rd place, bronze medalist(s)

== Tennis ==
Colombia qualified two athletes based on the 9 June 2014 ITF World Junior Rankings.

Singles

Athlete	Event	Round of 32	Round of 16	Quarterfinals	Semifinals	Final / BM	Rank
Athlete	Event	Opposition Score	Opposition Score	Opposition Score	Opposition Score	Opposition Score	Rank
Luis Valero	Boys' Singles	Biró (HUN); L 0-2; 3–6, 4-6	Did not advance				17
María Herazo González	Girls' Singles	Paražinskaitė (LTU); L 1-2; 6–2, 1–6, 1-6	Did not advance				17

Doubles

Athletes	Event	Round of 32	Round of 16	Quarterfinals	Semifinals	Final / BM	Rank
Athletes	Event	Opposition Score	Opposition Score	Opposition Score	Opposition Score	Opposition Score	Rank
Luis Valero (COL); Alex Rybakov (USA)	Boys' Doubles	—N/a	Bahamonde (ARG); Zukas (ARG); L 0-2; 6^{8}-7^{10}, 3-6	Did not advance			9
María Herazo González (COL); Luisa Stefani (BRA)	Girls' Doubles	—N/a	Kalinina (UKR); Shymanovich (BLR); L 0-2; 3–6, 6^{3}-7^{7}	Did not advance			9
María Herazo González (COL); Luis Valero (COL)	Mixed Doubles	Heinová (CZE); Carey (BAH); L 0-2; 3–6, 2-6	Did not advance				17

== Triathlon ==
Colombia qualified two athletes based on its performance at the 2014 American Youth Olympic Games Qualifier.

Individual

Athlete	Event	Swim (750m)	Trans 1	Bike (20 km)	Trans 2	Run (5 km)	Total Time	Rank
Eduardo Londoño	Boys	09:28	00:49	28:44	00:23	16:52	0:56:16	11
Carolina Velásquez	Girls	11:25	00:48	33:58	00:27	19:37	1:06:15	25

Relay

Athlete	Event	Total Times per Athlete (Swim 250m, Bike 6.6 km, Run 1.8 km)	Total Group Time	Rank
America 2 Emily Wagner (CAN); Eduardo Londoño (COL); Catalina Salazar (CHI); Seth Rider (USA)	Mixed Relay	21:31; 19:53; 23:56; 20:20	1:25:40	6
America 4 Ana Catalina Barahona (CRC); Diego Lopez Acosta (MEX); Carolina Velásquez (COL); Bryan Mendoza Ramos (ESA)	Mixed Relay	24:05; 20:37; 24:39; 21:07	1:30:28	12

== Weightlifting ==
Colombia qualified 1 quota in the boys' events and 1 quota in the girls' events based on the team ranking after the 2013 Weightlifting Youth World Championships.

Boys

Athlete	Event	Snatch		Clean & jerk		Total	Rank
Athlete	Event	Result	Rank	Result	Rank	Total	Rank
Andrés Caicedo	−69 kg	132	3	158	3	290	3rd place, bronze medalist(s)

Girls

Athlete	Event	Snatch		Clean & jerk		Total	Rank
Athlete	Event	Result	Rank	Result	Rank	Total	Rank
Yeinny Geles	+63 kg	97	5	117	5	214	5

== Wrestling ==
Colombia qualified three athletes based on its performance at the 2014 Pan American Cadet Championships.

Key:
- VT - Victory by Fall.
- PP - Decision by Points - the loser with technical points.
- PO - Decision by Points - the loser without technical points.

Boys

Athlete	Event	Group stage				Final / RM	Rank
Athlete	Event	Opposition Score	Opposition Score	Opposition Score	Rank	Opposition Score	Rank
Óscar Tigreros	Freestyle -46kg	Gadzhiev (RUS); L 0-4 ^{ST}	Kolekar (IND); W 3-1 ^{PP}	Ipolito (ASA); W 4-0 ^{VT}	2 Q	Duyum (TUR); L 1-3 ^{PP}	4
Carlos Izquierdo	Freestyle -76kg	Rivera (HON); W 4-0 ^{VT}	Simonia (GEO); L 1-3 ^{PP}	Barraj (TUN); W 3-1 ^{PP}	2 Q	Hovsepyan (ARM); L 1-4 ^{ST}	4

Girls

Athlete	Event	Group stage				Final / RM	Rank
Athlete	Event	Opposition Score	Opposition Score	Opposition Score	Rank	Opposition Score	Rank
Sandy Parra	Freestyle -60kg	Stans (RSA); W 3 - 0 ^{PO}	Pei (CHN); L	Aquino (GUM); W 4 - 0	2 Q	Larroque (FRA); L 0 - 4 ^{ST}	4
