= Belarus at the 2014 Summer Youth Olympics =

- IOC code: BLR
- NOC: Belarus Olympic Committee
- Website: www.noc.by

in Nanjing
- Competitors: 35 in 14 sports
- Flag bearer: Hanna Tarasiuk
- Medals Ranked 15th: Gold 4 Silver 3 Bronze 0 Total 7

Summer Youth Olympics appearances (overview)
- 2010; 2014; 2018

Belarus competed at the 2014 Summer Youth Olympics, in Nanjing, China from 16 August to 28 August 2014.

== Medalists ==
Medals awarded to participants of mixed-NOC (Combined) teams are represented in italics. These medals are not counted towards the individual NOC medal tally.

Medal	Name	Sport	Event	Date
Gold	Krystsina Staraselets	Rowing	Girls' Single Sculls	20 August
Gold	Iryna Shymanovich	Tennis	Girls' Doubles	23 August
Gold	Stanislau Daineka	Canoeing	Boys' K1 sprint	24 August
Gold	Kamila Bobr	Canoeing	Girls' C1 sprint	24 August
Gold	Hanna Tarasiuk	Athletics	Girls' Javelin throw	25 August
Silver	Dzmitry Minkou	Judo	Mixed Team	21 August
Silver	Elvira Herman	Athletics	Girls' 100 m hurdles	23 August
Silver	Iryna Shymanovich	Tennis	Girls' Singles	24 August
Silver	Mariya Trubach	Gymnastics	Girls' Rhythmic Individual All-Around	27 August

== Archery ==
Belarus qualified a male and female archer from its performance at the 2013 World Archery Youth Championships.

Individual

Athlete	Event	Ranking round		Round of 32	Round of 16	Quarterfinals	Semifinals	Final / BM	Rank
Athlete	Event	Score	Seed	Opposition Score	Opposition Score	Opposition Score	Opposition Score	Opposition Score	Rank
Aliaksei Dubrova	Boys' Individual	651	19	Martens (BEL); L 3–7	Did not advance				17
Sviatlana Kazanskaya	Girls' Individual	614	25	Giaccheri (ITA); L 2–6	Did not advance				17

Team

Athletes	Event	Ranking round		Round of 32	Round of 16	Quarterfinals	Semifinals	Final / BM	Rank
Athletes	Event	Score	Seed	Opposition Score	Opposition Score	Opposition Score	Opposition Score	Opposition Score	Rank
Aliaksei Dubrova (BLR); Bryony Pitman (GBR)	Mixed Team	1285	14	Tongeren (NED); Zamirova (TJK); W 5-3	Martens (BEL); Romero (GUA); L 1-5	Did not advance			9
Sviatlana Kazanskaya (BLR); Han Yun-Chien (TPE)	Mixed Team	1290	6	Fang (TPE); Turner (AUS); W 6-2	Raysin (ISR); Gazoz (TUR); W 5-4	Romero (GUA); Martens (BEL); L 2-6	Did not advance		7

== Athletics ==
Belarus qualified seven athletes.

Qualification Legend: Q=Final A (medal); qB=Final B (non-medal); qC=Final C (non-medal); qD=Final D (non-medal); qE=Final E (non-medal)

Boys
Track & road events

Athlete	Event	Heats		Final	
Athlete	Event	Result	Rank	Result	Rank
	200 m				

Field Events

Athlete	Event	Qualification		Final	
Athlete	Event	Distance	Rank	Distance	Rank
Valery Izotau	Javelin throw	71.70 PB	6 Q	69.77	5

Girls
Track & road events

Athlete	Event	Heats		Final	
Athlete	Event	Result	Rank	Result	Rank
Elvira Herman	100 m hurdles	13.43	2 Q	13.38	2nd place, silver medalist(s)
Natallia Malchanava	5 km walk	—N/a		26:32.83	15

Field events

Athlete	Event	Qualification		Final	
Athlete	Event	Distance	Position	Distance	Position
Anna Shpak	Pole vault	3.70	2 Q	3.80	4
Hanna Tarasiuk	Javelin throw	55.48	1 Q	59.52 PB	1st place, gold medalist(s)
Maryia Litvinka	Hammer throw	61.22	7 Q	60.94	7

== Boxing ==
Belarus qualified two boxers based on its performance at the 2014 AIBA Youth World Championships

Boys

Athlete	Event	Preliminaries	Semifinals	Final / RM	Rank
Athlete	Event	Opposition Result	Opposition Result	Opposition Result	Rank
Ilyas Adzinayeu	-69 kg	Bye	Melikuziev (UZB); L TKO	Bronze medal Bout Lizzi (ITA); L TKO	4
Maksim Kazlou	-91 kg	Gallagher (IRL); L 0-3	Did not advance	Bout for 5th place Marton (UKR); L 0-3	6

== Canoeing ==
Belarus qualified two boats based on its performance at the 2013 World Junior Canoe Sprint and Slalom Championships.

Boys

Athlete	Event	Qualification		Repechage		Round of 16		Quarterfinals	Semifinals	Final / BM	Rank
Athlete	Event	Time	Rank	Time	Rank	Time	Rank	Opposition Result	Opposition Result	Opposition Result	Rank
Stanislau Daineka	K1 slalom	DNF		—N/a		Did not advance					
Stanislau Daineka	K1 sprint	1:33.404	1 Q	—N/a		1:32.400	1 Q	Bouza Leyva (CUB); W 1:31.906	Oleynikov (RUS); W 1:32.564	Mozgi (HUN); W 1:36.913	1st place, gold medalist(s)

Girls

Athlete	Event	Qualification		Repechage		Round of 16		Quarterfinals	Semifinals	Final / BM	Rank
Athlete	Event	Time	Rank	Time	Rank	Time	Rank	Opposition Result	Opposition Result	Opposition Result	Rank
Kamila Bobr	C1 slalom	DNF		—N/a				Did not advance			
Kamila Bobr	C1 sprint	2:05.491	1 Q	—N/a				Kewat (IND); W 2:07.950	Lavoie-Parent (CAN); W 2:08.524	Luzan (UKR); W 2:21.640	1st place, gold medalist(s)

== Cycling ==
Belarus qualified a boys' and girls' team based on its ranking issued by the UCI.

Team

Athletes	Event	Cross-Country Eliminator		Time Trial			BMX		Cross-Country Race			Road Race			Total Pts	Rank
Athletes	Event	Rank	Points	Time	Rank	Points	Rank	Points	Time	Rank	Points	Time	Rank	Points	Total Pts	Rank
Anton Ivashkin; Dzmitry Zhyhunou	Boys' Team	20	0	5:24.73	18	0	12	12	-2 LAP	20	0	1:37:42; 1:37:23	40; 20	0	12	23
Marta Sachanka; Hanna Simakovich	Girls' Team	21	0	6:06.09	8	20	23	0	DNF2		0	1:12:36; 1:12:36	17; 11	8	28	24

Mixed Relay

Athletes	Event	Cross-Country Girls' Race	Cross-Country Boys' Race	Boys' Road Race	Girls' Road Race	Total Time	Rank
Hanna Simakovich; Anton Ivashkin; Dzmitry Zhyhunou; Marta Sachanka	Mixed Team Relay					19:20	17

== Diving ==
Belarus qualified two divers based on its performance at the Nanjing 2014 Diving Qualifying Event.

Athlete	Event	Preliminary		Final	
Athlete	Event	Points	Rank	Points	Rank
Yury Naurozau	Boys' 3 m springboard	477.45	9	527.20	8
Katsiaryna Fitsner	Girls' 10 m platform	281.10	11	299.00	10

== Gymnastics ==
=== Artistic Gymnastics ===
Belarus qualified one athlete based on its performance at the 2014 European MAG Championships and another athlete based on its performance at the 2014 European WAG Championships.

Boys

Athlete	Event	Apparatus						Total	Rank
Athlete	Event	F	PH	R	V	PB	HB	Total	Rank
Ilya Yakauleu	Qualification	13.100 19	9.075 39	13.450 4 Q	13.900 20	11.300 33	13.150 10	73.975	27
Ilya Yakauleu	Rings	—N/a						13.233	6

Girls

Athlete	Event	Apparatus				Total	Rank
Athlete	Event	V	UB	BB	F	Total	Rank
Natallia Yakubava	Qualification	12.850 29	11.650 14	13.150 6 Q	11.050 35	48.700	17 Q
Natallia Yakubava	All-Around	12.150	12.400	11.200	11.600	47.350	17
Natallia Yakubava	Balance Beam	—N/a				12.766	5

=== Rhythmic Gymnastics ===
Belarus qualified one athlete based on its performance at the 2014 Rhythmic Gymnastics Grand Prix in Moscow.

Individual

Athlete	Event	Qualification						Final					
Athlete	Event	Hoop	Ball	Clubs	Ribbon	Total	Rank	Hoop	Ball	Clubs	Ribbon	Total	Rank
Maryia Trubach	Individual	14.700	13.000	14.675	14.475	56.850	3 Q	14.650	14.400	14.000	13.900	56.950	2nd place, silver medalist(s)

=== Trampoline ===
Belarus qualified one athlete based on its performance at the 2014 European Trampoline Championships.

Athlete	Event	Qualification				Final	
Athlete	Event	Routine 1	Routine 2	Total	Rank	Score	Rank
Artsiom Zhuk	Boys	44.810 4	50.565 1	95.375	6 Q	54.415	5

== Judo ==
Belarus qualified two athletes based on its performance at the 2013 Cadet World Judo Championships.

Individual

Athlete	Event	Round of 32	Round of 16	Quarterfinals	Semifinals	Rep 1	Rep 2	Rep 3	Rep 4	Final / BM	Rank
Athlete	Event	Opposition Result	Opposition Result	Opposition Result	Opposition Result	Opposition Result	Opposition Result	Opposition Result	Opposition Result	Opposition Result	Rank
Dzmitry Minkou	Boys' -66 kg	—N/a	Ryu (KOR); L 000-100	Did not advance		Bye	Sarecz (HUN); W 001-000	Tursunov (UZB); L 000-100	Did not advance		9
Ulyana Minenkova	Girls' -52 kg	Štangar (SLO); L 001-101	Did not advance			Endamne (GAB); W 110-000	Gamarra (PER); W 001-001	Elizeche (ARG); L 000-100	Did not advance		9

Team

Athletes	Event	Round of 16	Quarterfinals	Semifinals	Final	Rank
Athletes	Event	Opposition Result	Opposition Result	Opposition Result	Opposition Result	Rank
Team Geesink; Layana Colman (BRA); Nemanja Majdov (SRB); Dzmitry Minkou (BLR); Ryu Seunghwan (KOR); Ivana Sunjevic (MNE); Anastasya Turcheva (RUS); Yu-Jyun Wang (TPE)	Mixed Team	Team Chochishvili (MIX); W 4 – 3	Team van de Walle (MIX); W 4 – 3	Team Geesink (MIX); W 3^{202} – 3^{111}	Team Rouge (MIX); L 2 - 4	2nd place, silver medalist(s)
Team Tani; Francesco Aufieri (MLT); Rostislav Dashkov (KGZ); Luis Gonzalez (VEN); Natig Gurbanli (AZE); Ulyana Minenkova (BLR); Khulan Tseregbaatar (MGL); Hassiatou Yahaya Aboubacar (NIG)	Mixed Team	Team Xian (MIX); L 0 – 7	Did not advance			9

== Modern Pentathlon ==
Belarus qualified two athletes based on its performance at the 2014 Youth A World Championships.

Athlete	Event	Fencing Ranking Round (épée one touch)		Swimming (200 m freestyle)			Fencing Final round (épée one touch)			Combined: Shooting/Running (10 m air pistol)/(3000 m)			Total Points	Final Rank
Athlete	Event	Results	Rank	Time	Rank	Points	Results	Rank	Points	Time	Rank	Points	Total Points	Final Rank
Mikita Harnastaeu	Boys' Individual		13	2:13.35	21	300		14	240	12:21.10	5	559	1099	18
Iryna Prasiantsova	Girls' Individual		9	2:23.89	15	269		10	260	14:06.88	13	454	983	12
Unknown; Mikita Harnastaeu (BLR)	Mixed Relay													
Iryna Prasiantsova (BLR); Unknown	Mixed Relay													

== Rowing ==
Belarus qualified one boat based on its performance at the 2013 World Rowing Junior Championships.

Athlete	Event	Heats		Repechage		Semifinals		Final	
Athlete	Event	Time	Rank	Time	Rank	Time	Rank	Time	Rank
Krystsina Staraselets	Girls' Single Sculls	3:44.97	1 SA/B	—N/a		3:52.02	1 FA	3:51.33	1st place, gold medalist(s)

Qualification Legend: FA=Final A (medal); FB=Final B (non-medal); FC=Final C (non-medal); FD=Final D (non-medal); SA/B=Semifinals A/B; SC/D=Semifinals C/D; R=Repechage

== Shooting ==
Belarus was given a wild card to compete.

Individual

Athlete	Event	Qualification		Final	
Athlete	Event	Points	Rank	Points	Rank
Marharyta Ramanchuk	Girls' 10m Air Pistol	367	12	Did not advance	

Team

Athletes	Event	Qualification		Round of 16	Quarterfinals	Semifinals	Final / BM	Rank
Athletes	Event	Points	Rank	Opposition Result	Opposition Result	Opposition Result	Opposition Result	Rank
Marharyta Ramanchuk (BLR); Jettakan Chokkaeo (THA)	Mixed Team 10m Air Pistol							

== Swimming ==
Belarus qualified four swimmers.

Boys

Athlete	Event	Heat		Semifinal		Final	
Athlete	Event	Time	Rank	Time	Rank	Time	Rank
Yauhen Kavaliou	50 m breaststroke	28.92	11 Q	29.15	16	Did not advance	
Yauhen Kavaliou	100 m breaststroke	1:03.42	11 Q	1:03.24	12	Did not advance	
Stanislau Pazdzeyeu	50 m breaststroke	28.75	6 Q	28.93	12	Did not advance	
Stanislau Pazdzeyeu	100 m breaststroke	1:02.99	8 Q	1:02.95	9	Did not advance	

Girls

Athlete	Event	Heat		Semifinal		Final	
Athlete	Event	Time	Rank	Time	Rank	Time	Rank
Katsiaryna Afanasyeva	50 m backstroke	29.99	20	Did not advance			
Katsiaryna Afanasyeva	100 m backstroke	1:05.13	25	Did not advance			
Alina Zmushka	50 m breaststroke	32.71	17	Did not advance			
Alina Zmushka	100 m breaststroke	1:10.81	11 Q	1:10.70	14	Did not advance	

== Tennis ==
Belarus qualified one athlete based on the 9 June 2014 ITF World Junior Rankings.

Singles

Athlete	Event	Round of 32	Round of 16	Quarterfinals	Semifinals	Final / BM	Rank
Athlete	Event	Opposition Score	Opposition Score	Opposition Score	Opposition Score	Opposition Score	Rank
Iryna Shymanovich	Girls' Singles	Kenin (USA); W 2-0; 6–2, 7^{7}-6^{4}	Giangreco Campiz (PAR); W 2-1; 1–6, 6–1, 7-5	Buayam (THA); W 2-1; 6^{8}-7^{10}, 6–3, 6-4	Kalinina (UKR); W 2-1; 3–6, 7^{9}-6^{7}, 6-2	Xu (CHN); L 0-2; 3–6, 1-6	2nd place, silver medalist(s)

Doubles

Athletes	Event	Round of 32	Round of 16	Quarterfinals	Semifinals	Final / BM	Rank
Athletes	Event	Opposition Score	Opposition Score	Opposition Score	Opposition Score	Opposition Score	Rank
Iryna Shymanovich (BLR); Anhelina Kalinina (UKR)	Girls' Doubles	—N/a	Herazo (COL); Stefani (BRA); W 2-0; 6–3, 7^{7}-6^{3}	Heinová (CZE); Vondroušová (CZE); W 2-0; 7–5, 7^{8}-6^{6}	Ostapenko (LAT); Paražinskaitė (LTU); W 2-0; 6–1, 6-3	Kasatkina (RUS); Komardina (RUS); W 2-0; 6–4, 6-4	1st place, gold medalist(s)
Iryna Shymanovich (BLR); Petros Chrysochos (CYP)	Mixed Doubles	Kim (KOR); Lee (KOR); L 1-2; 6–3, 4–6, [11]–[13]	Did not advance				17

== Wrestling ==
Belarus qualified one athlete based on its performance at the 2014 European Cadet Championships.

Key:
- VT - Victory by Fall.
- PP - Decision by Points - the loser with technical points.
- PO - Decision by Points - the loser without technical points.

Girls

Athlete	Event	Group stage				Final / RM	Rank
Athlete	Event	Opposition Score	Opposition Score	Opposition Score	Rank	Opposition Score	Rank
Ina Roik	Freestyle -46kg	Bolormaa (MGL); L 0 – 4	Castillo (VEN); L	Kadour (ALG); L 0 - 4	4	—N/a	7
