= Athletics at the 2014 Summer Youth Olympics – Girls' hammer throw =

Athletics – Girls' hammer throw at the II Summer Youth Olympic Games
- Venue: Nanjing Olympic Sports Centre
- Date: August 21–24
- Competitors: 15 from 15 nations

Medalists
1st place, gold medalist(s)		Xu Xinying	China
2nd place, silver medalist(s)		Alex Hulley	Australia
3rd place, bronze medalist(s)		Zsofia Matild Bacskay	Hungary

The girls’ hammer throw competition at the 2014 Summer Youth Olympics was held on 21–24 August 2014 in Nanjing Olympic Sports Center.

== Schedule ==
Date	Time	Round
21 August 2014	18:30	Qualification
24 August 2014	19:00	Final

== Results ==
=== Qualification ===
First 50% of the athletes from the Qualification round progress to the A Final and the remaining athletes to the B Final.

Rank	Athlete	1	2	3	4	Result	Notes	Q
1	Alex Hulley (AUS)	66.76	70.87	67.76	67.35	70.87	PB	FA
2	Lucia Prinetti Anzalapaya (ITA)	70.27	68.06	67.19	x	70.27	PB	FA
3	Zsofia Matild Bacskay (HUN)	66.25	69.35	68.05	x	69.35		FA
4	Xu Xinying (CHN)	x	67.19	68.19	r	68.19	PB	FA
5	Esraa Happe (EGY)	64.98	64.98	63.07	58.92	64.98		FA
6	Deniz Yaylaci (TUR)	61.93	62.31	61.94	56.95	62.31		FA
7	Maryia Litvinka (BLR)	60.39	61.22	x	53.59	61.22		FA
8	Magdalena Zycer (POL)	58.22	x	57.68	61.12	61.12		FA
9	Viktoriya Sakhno (UKR)	60.89	59.18	x	x	60.89		FB
10	Mayra Gaviria (COL)	x	59.99	60.27	x	60.27		FB
11	Efthimía Karastoyiánni (GRE)	58.18	59.76	57.64	x	59.76		FB
12	Polina Ciui (MDA)	53.69	59.06	57.97	59.73	59.73		FB
13	Lucie Stanková (CZE)	58.56	59.31	56.98	55.14	59.31		FB
14	Ana Fernandes (POR)	x	56.79	x	x	56.79		FB
15	Eva Mustafic (CRO)	55.62	55.88	55.79	56.73	56.73	PB	FB

=== Finals ===
==== Final A ====
Rank	Final Placing	Athlete	1	2	3	4	Result	Notes
1st place, gold medalist(s)	1	Xu Xinying (CHN)	67.70	x	65.29	68.35	68.35	PB
2nd place, silver medalist(s)	2	Alex Hulley (AUS)	63.23	66.81	68.35	x	68.35	
3rd place, bronze medalist(s)	3	Zsofia Matild Bacskay (HUN)	x	67.35	x	66.55	67.35	
4	4	Lucia Prinetti Anzalapaya (ITA)	x	4.91	x	65.86	65.86	
5	5	Deniz Yaylaci (TUR)	60.88	62.58	51.82	62.67	62.67	
6	6	Esraa Happe (EGY)	x	61.15	60.96	61.67	61.67	
7	7	Maryia Litvinka (BLR)	x	60.94	x	x	60.94	
8	8	Magdalena Zycer (POL)	x	x	55.60	x	55.60	

==== Final B ====
Rank	Final Placing	Athlete	1	2	3	4	Result	Notes
1	9	Viktoriya Sakhno (UKR)	60.33	x	x	55.55	60.33	
2	10	Ana Fernandes (POR)	59.06	58.71	57.34	56.69	59.06	PB
3	11	Mayra Gaviria (COL)	50.36	57.50	53.58	56.64	57.50	
4	12	Polina Ciui (MDA)	54.52	57.43	55.43	x	57.43	
5	13	Efthimía Karastoyiánni (GRE)	55.14	57.20	x	54.02	57.20	
6	14	Lucie Stanková (CZE)	x	55.56	x	54.44	55.56	
		Eva Mustafic (CRO)	x	x	x	x	NM	
