= Athletics at the 2014 Summer Youth Olympics – Boys' javelin throw =

Athletics – Boys' javelin throw at the II Summer Youth Olympic Games
- Venue: Nanjing Olympic Sports Centre
- Date: August 22–25
- Competitors: 16 from 16 nations

Medalists
1st place, gold medalist(s)		Lukas Moutarde	France
2nd place, silver medalist(s)		Alexandru Novac	Romania
3rd place, bronze medalist(s)		Márk schmölcz	Hungary

The boys’ javelin throw competition at the 2014 Summer Youth Olympics was held on 22–25 August 2014 in Nanjing Olympic Sports Center.

== Schedule ==
Date	Time	Round
22 August 2014	20:20	Qualification
25 August 2014	19:00	Final

== Results ==
=== Qualification ===
First 50% of the athletes from the Qualification round progress to the A Final and the remaining athletes to the B Final.

Rank	Athlete	1	2	3	4	Result	Notes	Q
1	Alexandru Novac (ROU)	68.60	72.12	77.61	73.82	77.61	PB	FA
2	Emin Öncel (TUR)	77.55	72.09	x	x	77.55	PB	FA
3	Baha Abdelwareth (EGY)	x	76.01	58.73	63.02	76.01	PB	FA
4	Márk Schmölcz (HUN)	75.99	x	x	-	75.99	PB	FA
5	Lukas Moutarde (FRA)	72.03	67.06	x	69.28	72.03	PB	FA
6	Valery Izotau (BLR)	63.96	71.70	66.41	x	71.70	PB	FA
7	Mateusz Strzeszewski (POL)	64.18	x	61.93	70.93	70.93		FA
8	Matthew Rees (AUS)	70.12	70.83	68.09	x	70.83		FA
9	Oleksandr Kozubskyy (UKR)	69.96	-	x	63.06	69.96		FB
10	Ubang Abola (ETH)	x	65.87	69.01	69.47	69.47	PB	FB
11	Xiang Jiabo (CHN)	45.87	68.48	64.78	57.21	68.48		FB
12	Manu Quijera (ESP)	68.32	x	x	x	68.32	PB	FB
13	Jazeps Groza (LAT)	x	64.29	x	66.36	65.36		FB
14	Jordan Zinelli (ITA)	61.79	64.45	56.91	x	64.45		FB
15	Eugene Niemann (NAM)	55.40	51.48	x	x	55.40		FB
	Luis Ibarguen (COL)	x	x	x	x	NM		FB

=== Finals ===
==== Final A ====
Rank	Final Placing	Athlete	1	2	3	4	Result	Notes
1st place, gold medalist(s)	1	Lukas Moutarde (FRA)	72.08	71.88	68.75	74.48	74.48	PB
2nd place, silver medalist(s)	2	Alexandru Novac (ROU)	60.56	73.98	73.23	70.41	73.98	
3rd place, bronze medalist(s)	3	Márk Schmölcz (HUN)	69.64	69.29	72.40	68.59	72.40	
4	4	Matthew Rees (AUS)	65.14	71.50	62.61	62.52	71.50	PB
5	5	Valery Izotau (BLR)	64.08	69.77	67.34	66.96	69.77	
6	6	Emin Öncel (TUR)	65.54	69.28	x	65.91	69.28	
7	7	Baha Abdelwareth (EGY)	61.42	x	57.64	69.03	69.03	
8	8	Mateusz Strzeszewski (POL)	x	64.29	x	x	64.29	

==== Final B ====
Rank	Final Placing	Athlete	1	2	3	4	Result	Notes
1	9	Jazeps Groza (LAT)	x	68.04	x	70.61	70.61	
2	10	Manu Quijera (ESP)	67.87	x	65.53	69.05	69.05	PB
3	11	Ubang Abola (ETH)	67.32	68.67	68.68	x	68.68	
4	12	Xiang Jiabo (CHN)	x	66.24	x	65.64	66.24	
5	13	Eugene Niemann (NAM)	53.83	55.58	x	x	55.58	
6	14	Jordan Zinelli (ITA)	53.30	x	x	53.25	53.30	
7	15	Luis Ibarguen (COL)	49.92	x	x	x	49.92	
		Oleksandr Kozubskyy (UKR)	x	x	x	x	DNS	
