= Athletics at the 2014 Summer Youth Olympics – Girls' pole vault =

Athletics – Girls' pole vault at the II Summer Youth Olympic Games
- Venue: Nanjing Olympic Sports Centre
- Date: August 20–23
- Competitors: 15 from 15 nations

Medalists
| 1st place, gold medalist(s) | | Angelica Moser | Switzerland |
| 2nd place, silver medalist(s) | | Robeilys Peinado | Venezuela |
| 3rd place, bronze medalist(s) | | Leda Kroselj | Slovenia |

The girls’ pole vault competition at the 2014 Summer Youth Olympics was held on 20–23 August 2014 in Nanjing Olympic Sports Center.

== Schedule ==
| Date | Time | Round |
|---|---|---|
| 20 August 2014 | 19:00 | Qualification |
| 23 August 2014 | 19:15 | Final |

== Results ==
=== Qualification ===
First 50% of the athletes from the Qualification round progress to the A Final and the remaining athletes to the B Final.

| Rank | Athlete | 2.80 | 3.00 | 3.20 | 3.40 | 3.55 | 3.70 | 3.80 | Result | Notes | Q |
|---|---|---|---|---|---|---|---|---|---|---|---|
| 1 | Angelica Moser (SUI) | - | - | - | - | - | - | xo | 3.80 | | FA |
| 2 | Thiziri Daci (FRA) | - | - | - | o | o | o | - | 3.70 | | FA |
| 2 | Leda Krosel (SLO) | - | - | - | o | o | o | - | 3.70 | | FA |
| 2 | Robeilys Peinado (VEN) | - | - | - | o | o | o | - | 3.70 | | FA |
| 2 | Anna Shpak (BLR) | - | - | - | - | - | o | - | 3.70 | | FA |
| 6 | Zuzana Pražáková (CZE) | - | - | - | o | xo | o | - | 3.70 | | FA |
| 7 | Juliane Schulze (GER) | - | - | - | - | o | xo | - | 3.70 | | FA |
| 8 | Réka Kiss (HUN) | - | - | o | o | o | xxx | | 3.55 | | FA |
| 9 | Elena Gladkova (AZE) | - | - | - | xo | o | xxx | | 3.55 | | FB |
| 10 | Jelita Nara Idea (INA) | - | - | - | xo | o | xxx | | 3.55 | SB | FB |
| 11 | Misaki Morota (JPN) | - | - | - | o | xxx | | | 3.40 | | FB |
| 12 | Shen Yi-Ju (TPE) | - | - | - | xo | xxx | | | 3.40 | | FB |
| 13 | Thais Gomes (BRA) | - | - | xo | xxx | | | | 3.20 | | FB |
| | May Mezioud (ALG) | xxx | | | | | | | NM | | FB |
| | Giseth Montaño (COL) | - | - | - | - | xxx | | | NM | | FB |

=== Finals ===
==== Final A ====
| Rank | Final Placing | Athlete | 3.40 | 3.55 | 3.70 | 3.80 | 3.90 | 4.00 | 4.05 | 4.10 | 4.15 | 4.20 | 4.36 | 4.48 | Result | Notes |
|---|---|---|---|---|---|---|---|---|---|---|---|---|---|---|---|---|
| 1st place, gold medalist(s) | 1 | Angelica Moser (SUI) | - | - | - | - | - | xo | - | o | - | o | xxo | xxx | 4.36 | PB |
| 2nd place, silver medalist(s) | 2 | Robeilys Peinado (VEN) | - | - | - | o | - | xo | - | o | - | xxx | | | 4.10 | |
| 3rd place, bronze medalist(s) | 3 | Leda Krosel (SLO) | o | o | o | o | o | xxx | | | | | | | 3.90 | |
| 4 | 4 | Anna Shpak (BLR) | - | - | xxo | o | xxx | | | | | | | | 3.80 | |
| 5 | 5 | Thiziri Daci (FRA) | - | o | o | xo | xxx | | | | | | | | 3.80 | |
| 6 | 6 | Juliane Schulze (GER) | - | xo | o | xxx | | | | | | | | | 3.70 | |
| 7 | 7 | Réka Kiss (HUN) | o | o | xo | xxx | | | | | | | | | 3.70 | |
| 8 | 8 | Zuzana Pražáková (CZE) | o | o | xxo | xxx | | | | | | | | | 3.70 | |

==== Final B ====
| Rank | Final Placing | Athlete | 2.90 | 3.05 | 3.20 | 3.30 | 3.40 | 3.50 | 3.55 | 3.60 | 3.65 | 3.70 | 3.75 | 3.80 | Result | Notes |
|---|---|---|---|---|---|---|---|---|---|---|---|---|---|---|---|---|
| 1 | 9 | Jelita Nara Idea (INA) | - | - | - | - | xo | o | o | - | xo | o | xo | xxx | 3.75 | PB |
| 2 | 10 | Elena Gladkova (AZE) | - | - | - | - | o | xo | o | xo | o | xo | xxx | | 3.70 | |
| 3 | 11 | Misaki Morota (JPN) | - | - | - | - | o | o | xxx | | | | | | 3.50 | |
| 4 | 12 | Shen Yi-Ju (TPE) | - | - | - | - | xo | xxx | | | | | | | 3.40 | |
| | | Thais Gomes (BRA) | - | - | xxx | | | | | | | | | | NM | |
| | | May Mezioud (ALG) | | | | | | | | | | | | | DNS | |
| | | Giseth Montaño (COL) | | | | | | | | | | | | | DNS | |
