= Luxembourg at the 2014 Summer Youth Olympics =

- IOC code: LUX
- NOC: Luxembourgian Olympic and Sporting Committee

in Nanjing
- Competitors: 4 in 3 sports
- Medals: Gold 0 Silver 0 Bronze 0 Total 0

Summer Youth Olympics appearances
- 2010; 2014; 2018

Luxembourg competed at the 2014 Summer Youth Olympics, in Nanjing, China from 16 August to 28 August 2014.

== Medalists ==
Medals awarded to participants of mixed-NOC (Combined) teams are represented in italics. These medals are not counted towards the individual NOC medal tally.

Medal	Name	Sport	Event	Date
Bronze	Felix Penning	Judo	Mixed Team	21 Aug

== Athletics ==
Luxembourg qualified one athlete.

Qualification Legend: Q=Final A (medal); qB=Final B (non-medal); qC=Final C (non-medal); qD=Final D (non-medal); qE=Final E (non-medal)

Girls
Field events

Athlete	Event	Qualification		Final	
Athlete	Event	Distance	Rank	Distance	Rank
Elodie Tshilumba	High jump	1.78	8 Q	1.81	5

== Judo ==
Luxembourg was given a quota to compete by the tripartite committee.

Individual

Athlete	Event	Round of 32	Round of 16	Quarterfinals	Semifinals	Rep 1	Rep 2	Rep 3	Rep 4	Final / BM	Rank
Athlete	Event	Opposition Result	Opposition Result	Opposition Result	Opposition Result	Opposition Result	Opposition Result	Opposition Result	Opposition Result	Opposition Result	Rank
Felix Penning	Boys' -81 kg	I Vardi (ISR); L 0000 – 1112	did not advance			Y Lo (TPE); W 1001 – 0101	L Kovac (CRO); W 1000 – 0000	M Bubanja (AUT); L 0001 – 1011	did not advance		9

Team

Athletes	Event	Round of 16	Quarterfinals	Semifinals	Final	Rank
Athletes	Event	Opposition Result	Opposition Result	Opposition Result	Opposition Result	Rank
Team Xian; Hifumi Abe (JPN); Chiara Carminucci (ITA); Naomi de Brune (AUS); Jolan Florimont (FRA); Brillith Gamarra (PER); Felix Penning (LUX); Marusa Stangar (SLO); Idan Vardi (ISR)	Mixed Team	Team Tani (MIX); W 7 – 0	Team Berghmans (MIX); W 4 – 3	Team Rouge (MIX); L 3 – 4	Did not advance	3rd place, bronze medalist(s)

== Swimming ==
Luxembourg qualified two swimmers.

Girls

Athlete	Event	Heat		Semifinal		Final	
Athlete	Event	Time	Rank	Time	Rank	Time	Rank
Julie Meynen	50 m freestyle	26.01	6 Q	25.60	4 Q	25.57	4
Julie Meynen	100 m freestyle	57.06	13 Q	55.33	3 Q	55.29	6
Monique Olivier	200 m freestyle	2:03.59	17	—		did not advance	
Monique Olivier	400 m freestyle	4:16.37	10	—		did not advance	
Monique Olivier	800 m freestyle	—				8:47.71	9
Monique Olivier	200 m individual medley	2:23.17	22	—		did not advance	
