= Malta at the 2014 Summer Youth Olympics =

- IOC code: MLT
- NOC: Kumitat Olimpiku Malti

in Nanjing
- Competitors: 4 in 3 sports
- Medals: Gold 0 Silver 0 Bronze 0 Total 0

Summer Youth Olympics appearances
- 2010; 2014; 2018

Malta competed at the 2014 Summer Youth Olympics, in Nanjing, China from 16 August to 28 August 2014.

== Judo ==
Malta was given a quota to compete by the tripartite committee.

Individual

Athlete	Event	Round of 32	Round of 16	Quarterfinals	Semifinals	Rep 1	Rep 2	Rep 3	Rep 4	Final / BM	Rank
Athlete	Event	Opposition Result	Opposition Result	Opposition Result	Opposition Result	Opposition Result	Opposition Result	Opposition Result	Opposition Result	Opposition Result	Rank
Francesco Aufieri	Boys' -81 kg	Bye	N Majdov (SRB); L 0000 – 1000	did not advance		N Grinda (MON); L 0000 – 1000	did not advance				17

Team

Athletes	Event	Round of 16	Quarterfinals	Semifinals	Final	Rank
Athletes	Event	Opposition Result	Opposition Result	Opposition Result	Opposition Result	Rank
Team Tani; Francesco Aufieri (MLT); Rostislav Dashkov (KGZ); Luis Gonzalez (VEN); Natig Gurbanli (AZE); Ulyana Minenkova (BLR); Khulan Tseregbaatar (MGL); Hassiatou Yahaya Aboubacar (NIG)	Mixed Team	Team Xian (MIX); L 0 – 7	did not advance			9

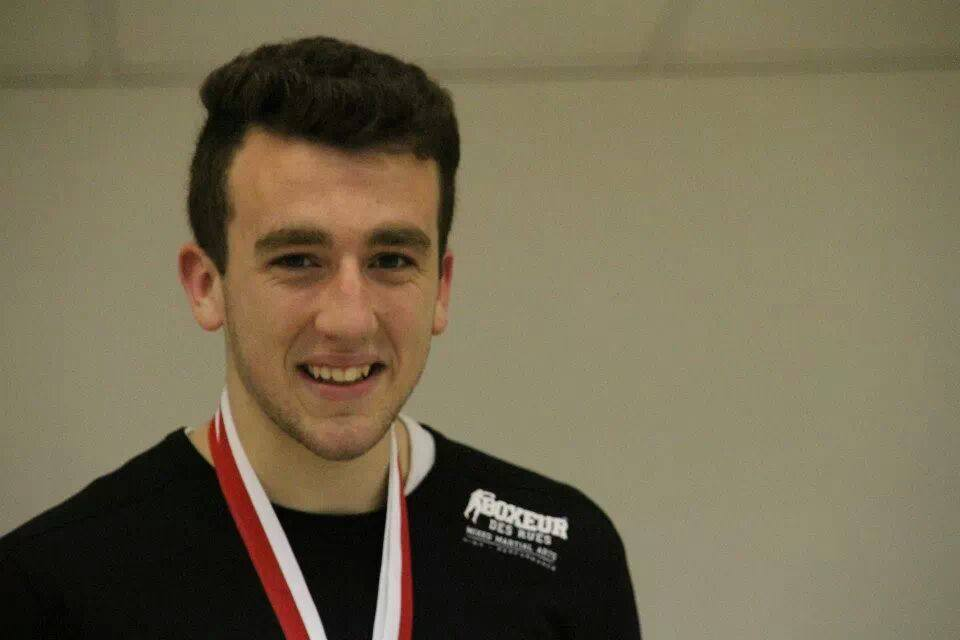
Francesco Aufieri

== Swimming ==
Malta qualified two swimmers.

Boys

Athlete	Event	Heat		Semifinal		Final	
Athlete	Event	Time	Rank	Time	Rank	Time	Rank
Raoul Stafrace	50 m freestyle	24.02	25	did not advance			
Raoul Stafrace	100 m freestyle	53.45	33	did not advance			
Julian Harding	50 m breaststroke	30.04	28	did not advance			
Julian Harding	100 m breaststroke	1:06.38	32	did not advance			

== Weightlifting ==
Malta was given a quota to compete in a girls' event by the tripartite committee.

Girls

Athlete	Event	Snatch		Clean & jerk		Total	Rank
Athlete	Event	Result	Rank	Result	Rank	Total	Rank
Nicole Gatt	−53 kg	48	8	71	7	119	8
