= Monaco at the 2014 Summer Youth Olympics =

- IOC code: MON
- NOC: Monaco Olympic Committee
- Website: www.comite-olympique.mc

in Nanjing
- Competitors: 1 in 1 sport
- Medals: Gold 0 Silver 0 Bronze 0 Total 0

Summer Youth Olympics appearances
- 2010; 2014; 2018

Monaco competed at the 2014 Summer Youth Olympics, in Nanjing, China from 16 August to 28 August 2014.

== Judo ==
Monaco was given a quota to compete by the tripartite committee.

Individual

Athlete	Event	Round of 32	Round of 16	Quarterfinals	Semifinals	Rep 1	Rep 2	Rep 3	Rep 4	Final / BM	Rank
Athlete	Event	Opposition Result	Opposition Result	Opposition Result	Opposition Result	Opposition Result	Opposition Result	Opposition Result	Opposition Result	Opposition Result	Rank
Nicolas Grinda	Boys' -81 kg	J Basile (BRA); L 0100 – 1100	did not advance			F Aufieri (MLT); W 1000 – 0000	O Snoussi (TUN); L 0000 – 1000	did not advance			13

Team

Athletes	Event	Round of 16	Quarterfinals	Semifinals	Final	Rank
Athletes	Event	Opposition Result	Opposition Result	Opposition Result	Opposition Result	Rank
Team Nevzorov; Mihanta Andriamifehy (MAD); Brigitte Carabalí (COL); Nicolas Grinda (MON); Bryan Jolly (AUS); Tamazi Kirakozashvili (GEO); Salim Rebahi (ALG); Aleksandra Samardzic (BIH)	Mixed Team	Bye	Team Douillet (MIX); L 2 – 5	did not advance		5
