= Tajikistan at the 2014 Summer Youth Olympics =

- IOC code: TJK
- NOC: National Olympic Committee of the Republic of Tajikistan

in Nanjing
- Competitors: 8 in 6 sports
- Medals: Gold 0 Silver 0 Bronze 0 Total 0

Summer Youth Olympics appearances
- 2010; 2014; 2018; 2026

Tajikistan competed at the 2014 Summer Youth Olympics, in Nanjing, China from 16 August to 28 August 2014.

== Archery ==
Tajikistan was given a quota to compete by the tripartite committee.

Individual

Athlete	Event	Ranking round		Round of 32	Round of 16	Quarterfinals	Semifinals	Final / BM	Rank
Athlete	Event	Score	Seed	Opposition Score	Opposition Score	Opposition Score	Opposition Score	Opposition Score	Rank
Anisa Zamirova	Girls' Individual	599	29	Marin (ESP); L 0 – 6	did not advance				17

Team

Athletes	Event	Ranking round		Round of 32	Round of 16	Quarterfinals	Semifinals	Final / BM	Rank
Athletes	Event	Score	Seed	Opposition Score	Opposition Score	Opposition Score	Opposition Score	Opposition Score	Rank
Anisa Zamirova (TJK); Jan van Tongeren (NED)	Mixed Team	1281	19	Pitman (GBR); Dubrova (BLR) (14); L 3–5	did not advance				17

== Athletics ==
Tajikistan qualified one athlete.

Qualification Legend: Q=Final A (medal); qB=Final B (non-medal); qC=Final C (non-medal); qD=Final D (non-medal); qE=Final E (non-medal)

Girls
Track & road events

Athlete	Event	Heats		Final	
Athlete	Event	Result	Rank	Result	Rank
Mekhrangez Nazarova	3000 m	10:11.06	15 qB	9:59.84	14

== Judo ==
Tajikistan was given a quota to compete by the tripartite committee.

Individual

Athlete	Event	Round of 32	Round of 16	Quarterfinals	Semifinals	Rep 1	Rep 2	Rep 3	Rep 4	Final / BM	Rank
Athlete	Event	Opposition Result	Opposition Result	Opposition Result	Opposition Result	Opposition Result	Opposition Result	Opposition Result	Opposition Result	Opposition Result	Rank
Salim Farukhi	Boys' -81 kg	O Snoussi (TUN); L 0002 – 1003	did not advance			M Kuusik (EST); W 1012 – 0003	J Basile (BRA); W 1000 – 0100	L Krieber (CAN); L 0000 – 1000	did not advance		9

Team

Athletes	Event	Round of 16	Quarterfinals	Semifinals	Final	Rank
Athletes	Event	Opposition Result	Opposition Result	Opposition Result	Opposition Result	Rank
Team Kano; Melisa Çakmaklı (TUR); Salim Darukhi (TJK); Mariam Janashvili (GEO); Arso Milic (MNE); Gavin Mogopa (BOT); Elvismar Rodriguez (VEN); Stoyan Tarapanov (BUL); Tea Tintor (SRB)	Mixed Team	Team Rouge (MIX); L 2 – 5	did not advance			9

== Shooting ==
Tajikistan was given a wild card to compete.

Individual

Athlete	Event	Qualification		Final	
Athlete	Event	Points	Rank	Points	Rank
Dzhafar Shermatov	Boys' 10m Air Pistol	521	20	did not advance	

Team

Athletes	Event	Qualification		Round of 16	Quarterfinals	Semifinals	Final / BM	Rank
Athletes	Event	Points	Rank	Opposition Result	Opposition Result	Opposition Result	Opposition Result	Rank
Agata Nowak (POL); Dzhafar Shermatov (TJK)	Mixed Team 10m Air Pistol	740	13 Q	A Rasmane (LAT); W Madrid (GUA); L 7 – 10	did not advance			17

== Swimming ==
Tajikistan qualified one swimmer.

Girls

Athlete	Event	Heat		Semifinal		Final	
Athlete	Event	Time	Rank	Time	Rank	Time	Rank
Karina Klimyk	50 m freestyle	31.94	42	did not advance			

== Wrestling ==
Tajikistan qualified three athletes based on its performance at the 2014 European Cadet Championships.

Key:
- VT - Victory by Fall.
- PP - Decision by Points - the loser with technical points.
- PO - Decision by Points - the loser without technical points.

Boys

Athlete	Event	Group stage				Final / RM	Rank
Athlete	Event	Opposition Score	Opposition Score	Opposition Score	Rank	Opposition Score	Rank
Firuz Yakubov	Freestyle -100kg	M Rozykulyev (TKM); W 3 – 1	B Pratt (AUS); W 4 – 0	D Ceacusta (MDA); L 0 – 4	2 Q	A Elgizawee (EGY); L 1 – 4 ^{ST}	4
Ravzatullo Isoev	Greco-Roman -42kg	S Ri (PRK); L 0 – 4 ^{ST}	E Perez (MEX); W 4 – 0 ^{VT}	—N/a	2 Q	O Masyk (UKR); L 1 – 3 ^{PP}	4
Tohirjon Okhonov	Greco-Roman -85kg	S McMoore (ASA); W 4 – 0	M Bemalian (RUS); L 1 – 4	R Khehira (CAN); W 4 – 0	2 Q	A Ahmed (EGY); L 0 – 4 ^{ST}	4
