= Athletics at the 2014 Summer Youth Olympics – Girls' long jump =

Athletics – Girls' long jump at the II Summer Youth Olympic Games
- Venue: Nanjing Olympic Sports Centre
- Date: August 20–23
- Competitors: 15 from 15 nations

Medalists
1st place, gold medalist(s)		Yelyzaveta Baby	Ukraine
2nd place, silver medalist(s)		Beatrice Fiorese	Italy
3rd place, bronze medalist(s)		Rhesa Foster	United States

The girls’ long jump competition at the 2014 Summer Youth Olympics was held on 20–23 August 2014 in Nanjing Olympic Sports Center.

== Schedule ==
Date	Time	Round
20 August 2014	20:00	Qualification
23 August 2014	19:10	Final

== Results ==
=== Qualification ===
First 50% of the athletes from the Qualification round progress to the A Final and the remaining athletes to the B Final.

Rank	Athlete	1	2	3	4	Result	Notes	Q
1	Beatrice Fiorese (ITA)	x	5.96	5.96	6.26	6.26	PB	FA
2	Hanne Maudens (BEL)	6.07	6.01	5.85	6.00	6.07		FA
3	Yelyzaveta Baby (UKR)	5.97	5.99	x	5.98	5.99		FA
4	Mari Dzagnidze (GEO)	5.78	5.82	5.90	5.88	5.90		FA
5	Kristal Liburd (SKN)	x	5.66	5.79	5.65	5.79		FA
6	Rhesa Foster (USA)	x	x	x	5.76	5.76		FA
7	Magali Roche (CAN)	5.70	5.60	5.57	5.47	5.70		FA
8	Esraa Owis (EGY)	5.55	5.50	5.56	5.70	5.70	SB	FA
9	Sharin Oziegbe (GER)	5.57	5.37	x	5.50	5.57		FB
10	Elen Vasconcelos (BRA)	x	5.10	5.57	x	5.57		FB
11	Ekaterina Kropivko (RUS)	5.32	5.41	5.48	5.50	5.50		FB
12	Noemí Sempere (ESP)	x	5.38	x	5.49	5.49		FB
13	Wen Wan-Ju (TPE)	5.41	5.34	x	5.42	5.42		FB
14	Kala Penn (IVB)	4.76	5.08	5.22	4.93	5.22		FB
15	Masterline Saint-Vil (HAI)	4.43	4.25	4.22	4.22	4.43		FB

=== Finals ===
==== Final A ====
Rank	Final Placing	Athlete	1	2	3	4	Result	Notes
1st place, gold medalist(s)	1	Yelyzaveta Baby (UKR)	5.98	6.12	6.26	5.95	6.26	PB
2nd place, silver medalist(s)	2	Beatrice Fiorese (ITA)	6.00	6.21	6.04	5.13	6.21	
3rd place, bronze medalist(s)	3	Rhesa Foster (USA)	5.62	6.17	x	5.98	6.17	PB
4	4	Hanne Maudens (BEL)	x	5.99	6.04	6.03	6.04	
5	5	Kristal Liburd (SKN)	5.77	5.44	5.92	5.70	5.92	
6	6	Magali Roche (CAN)	5.44	5.79	5.90	5.75	5.90	
7	7	Mari Dzagnidze (GEO)	5.87	x	5.87	5.83	5.87	
8	8	Esraa Owis (EGY)	5.65	5.62	5.62	5.70	5.70	=SB

==== Final B ====
Rank	Final Placing	Athlete	1	2	3	4	Result	Notes
1	9	Ekaterina Kropivko (RUS)	5.66	5.92	5.87	5.83	5.92	
2	10	Elen Vasconcelos (BRA)	x	x	5.60	5.59	5.60	
3	11	Noemí Sempere (ESP)	x	5.41	x	5.53	5.53	
4	12	Wen Wan-Ju (TPE)	x	x	5.41	x	5.41	
5	13	Sharin Oziegbe (GER)	5.40	5.32	x	x	5.40	
6	14	Kala Penn (IVB)	5.19	4.89	5.18	5.08	5.19	
7	15	Masterline Saint-Vil (HAI)	4.32	4.14	4.26	4.37	4.37	
