= Serbia at the 2014 Summer Youth Olympics =

- IOC code: SRB
- NOC: Olympic Committee of Serbia
- Website: www.oks.org.rs

in Nanjing
- Competitors: 24 in 12 sports
- Flag bearer: Ivana Jorović
- Medals Ranked 70th: Gold 0 Silver 1 Bronze 0 Total 1

Summer Youth Olympics appearances
- 2010; 2014; 2018

Serbia competed at the 2014 Summer Youth Olympics, in Nanjing, China from 16 August to 28 August 2014. The Olympic Committee of Serbia confirmed that the country will be represented by 24 athletes in 12 sports. The Serbian flag at the opening ceremony was carried by tennis player Ivana Jorović.

== Medalists ==
Medals awarded to participants of mixed-NOC (Combined) teams are represented in italics. These medals are not counted towards the individual NOC medal tally.

| Medal | Name | Sport | Event | Date |
|---|---|---|---|---|
| Silver | Tamaš Kajdoči | Weightlifting | Boys' +85 kg | 23 August |
| Silver | Nemanja Majdov | Judo | Mixed Team | 21 August |

== Athletics ==
Serbia qualified two athletes.

Qualification Legend: Q=Final A (medal); qB=Final B (non-medal); qC=Final C (non-medal); qD=Final D (non-medal); qE=Final E (non-medal)

Girls
Track & road events

| Athlete | Event | Heats | | Final | |
| Athlete | Event | Result | Rank | Result | Rank |
|---|---|---|---|---|---|
| Jasmina Pruginić | 2000 m steeplechase | 7:25.93 | 15 qB | 7:04.70 | 2 |

Field events

| Athlete | Event | Qualification | | Final | |
| Athlete | Event | Distance | Rank | Distance | Rank |
|---|---|---|---|---|---|
| Atina Kamasi | Javelin throw | 47.21 | 11 qB | 49.63 | 1 |

== Badminton ==
Serbia qualified one athlete based on the 2 May 2014 BWF Junior World Rankings.

Singles

| Athlete | Event | Group stage | | | | Quarterfinal | Semifinal | Final / BM | Rank |
| Athlete | Event | Opposition Score | Opposition Score | Opposition Score | Rank | Opposition Score | Opposition Score | Opposition Score | Rank |
|---|---|---|---|---|---|---|---|---|---|
| Dragoslav Petrović | Boys' Singles | Joshi (IND); L 0-2 | Pham (VIE); L 0-2 | Sarsekenov (UKR); W 2-0 | 3 | did not advance | | | |

Doubles

| Athlete | Event | Group stage | | | | Quarterfinal | Semifinal | Final / BM | Rank |
| Athlete | Event | Opposition Score | Opposition Score | Opposition Score | Rank | Opposition Score | Opposition Score | Opposition Score | Rank |
|---|---|---|---|---|---|---|---|---|---|
| Liang Xiaoyu (SIN); Dragoslav Petrović (SRB) | Mixed Doubles | Garrido (MEX); Kuuba (EST); W 2-0 | Lu (TPE); Lee (MAS); L 1-2 | Pham (VIE); Demirbag (TUR); L 1-2 | 2 | did not advance | | | |

== Canoeing ==
Serbia qualified one boat based on its performance at the 2013 World Junior Canoe Sprint and Slalom Championships.

Boys

| Athlete | Event | Qualification | | Repechage | | Round of 16 | | Quarterfinals | Semifinals | Final / BM | Rank |
| Athlete | Event | Time | Rank | Time | Rank | Time | Rank | Opposition Result | Opposition Result | Opposition Result | Rank |
|---|---|---|---|---|---|---|---|---|---|---|---|
| Bojan Milinković | K1 slalom | DSQ | | —N/a | | did not advance | | | | | |
| Bojan Milinković | K1 sprint | 1:35.216 | 4 Q | —N/a | | 1:35.637 | 4 Q | Ferreira (POR); 1:35.505; W | Mozgi (HUN)1:36.270; L | Oleynikov (RUS)1:41.951; L | 4 |

== Cycling ==
Serbia qualified a girls' team based on its ranking issued by the UCI. Serbia received a tripartite Invitation for boys' team.

Team

| Athletes | Event | Cross-Country Eliminator | | Time Trial | | | BMX | | Cross-Country Race | | | Road Race | | | Total Pts | Rank |
| Athletes | Event | Rank | Points | Time | Rank | Points | Rank | Points | Time | Rank | Points | Time | Rank | Points | Total Pts | Rank |
|---|---|---|---|---|---|---|---|---|---|---|---|---|---|---|---|---|
| Dušan Rajović; Aleksandar Roman | Boys' Team | 10 | 10 | 5:19.95 | 11 | 8 | 14 | 6 | -1 LAP | 16 | 1 | 1:37:23; 1:37:42 | 13; 38 | 4 | 29 | 20 |
| Jelena Erić; Milica Rakić | Girls' Team | 6 | 30 | 6:13.19 | 12 | 6 | 25 | 0 | 47:37 | 6 | 30 | 1:12:36; 1:12:36 | 12; 27 | 6 | 72 | 18 |

Mixed Relay

| Athletes | Event | Cross-Country Girls' Race | Cross-Country Boys' Race | Boys' Road Race | Girls' Road Race | Total Time | Rank |
|---|---|---|---|---|---|---|---|
| Jelena Erić; Aleksandar Roman; Dušan Rajović; Milica Rakić | Mixed Team Relay | | | | | 18:22 | 10 |

== Judo ==
Serbia qualified two athletes based on its performance at the 2013 Cadet World Judo Championships.

Individual

| Athlete | Event | Round of 32 | Round of 16 | Quarterfinals | Semifinals | Rep 1 | Rep 2 | Rep 3 | Rep 4 | Final / BM | Rank |
| Athlete | Event | Opposition Result | Opposition Result | Opposition Result | Opposition Result | Opposition Result | Opposition Result | Opposition Result | Opposition Result | Opposition Result | Rank |
|---|---|---|---|---|---|---|---|---|---|---|---|
| Nemanja Majdov | Boys' -81 kg | —N/a | Aufieri (MLT); W 110-000 | Krieber-gagnon (CAN); W 002-000 | Igolnikov (RUS); L 000-100 | —N/a | | | | Silva (CUB); L 000-010 | 5 |
| Tea Tintor | Girls' -63 kg | —N/a | Drozdova (UKR); L 000-110 | did not advance | | —N/a | Piovesana (GBR); L 000-101 | did not advance | | | 17 |

Team

| Athletes | Event | Round of 16 | Quarterfinals | Semifinals | Final | Rank |
| Athletes | Event | Opposition Result | Opposition Result | Opposition Result | Opposition Result | Rank |
|---|---|---|---|---|---|---|
| Team Geesink; Layana Colman (BRA); Nemanja Majdov (SRB); Dzmitry Minkou (BLR); Ryu Seunghwan (KOR); Ivana Sunjevic (MNE); Anastasya Turcheva (RUS); Yu-Jyun Wang (TPE) | Mixed Team | Team Chochishvili (MIX); W 4 – 3 | Team Van De Walle (MIX); W 4 – 3 | Team Douillet (MIX); W 3^{202} – 3^{111} | Team Rouge (MIX); L 2 – 4 | 2nd place, silver medalist(s) |
| Team Kano; Melisa Çakmaklı (TUR); Salim Darukhi (TJK); Mariam Janashvili (GEO); Arso Milic (MNE); Gavin Mogopa (BOT); Elvismar Rodriguez (VEN); Stoyan Tarapanov (BUL); Tea Tintor (SRB) | Mixed Team | Team Rouge (MIX); L 2 – 5 | did not advance | | | 9 |

== Rowing ==
Serbia qualified one quota place after the 2013 World Rowing Junior Championships.

| Athlete | Event | Heats | | Repechage | | Semifinals | | Final | |
| Athlete | Event | Time | Rank | Time | Rank | Time | Rank | Time | Rank |
|---|---|---|---|---|---|---|---|---|---|
| Zoran Rajić | Boys' Single Sculls | 3:25.93 | 2 R | 3:33.87 | 3 SC/D | 3:25.84 | 1 FC | 3:32.06 | 15 |

Qualification Legend: FA=Final A (medal); FB=Final B (non-medal); FC=Final C (non-medal); FD=Final D (non-medal); SA/B=Semifinals A/B; SC/D=Semifinals C/D; R=Repechage

== Shooting ==
Serbia qualified two shooters based on its performance at the 2014 European Shooting Championships.

Individual

| Athlete | Event | Qualification | | Final | |
| Athlete | Event | Points | Rank | Points | Rank |
|---|---|---|---|---|---|
| Andrija Milovanović | Boys' 10m Air Rifle | 615.4 | 5 Q | 142.2 | 5 |
| Milica Babić | Girls' 10m Air Rifle | 414.1 | 5 Q | 100.9 | 7 |

Team

| Athletes | Event | Qualification | | Round of 16 | Quarterfinals | Semifinals | Final / BM | Rank |
| Athletes | Event | Points | Rank | Opposition Result | Opposition Result | Opposition Result | Opposition Result | Rank |
|---|---|---|---|---|---|---|---|---|
| Agata Riccardi (SMR); Andrija Milovanovic (SRB) | Mixed Team 10m Air Rifle | 821.2 | 6 Q | M Veloso (SIN); D Clopatofsky (AUS); W 10 – 8 | I Babic (CRO); S Laurens (RSA); W 10 – 6 | H Mekhimar (EGY); I Peni (HUN); L 5 – 10 | V Sukhorukova (UKR); S Lu (TPE); L 6 – 10 | 4 |
| Celdon Jude Arellano (PHI); Milica Babić (SRB) | Mixed Team 10m Air Rifle | 811.5 | 15 Q | H Mekhimar (EGY)/ I Peni (HUN); L 3 - 10 | did not advance | | | 17 |

== Swimming ==
Serbia qualified four swimmers.

Boys

| Athlete | Event | Heat | | Semifinal | | Final | |
| Athlete | Event | Time | Rank | Time | Rank | Time | Rank |
|---|---|---|---|---|---|---|---|
| Uroš Nikolić | 100 m freestyle | 51.75 | 21 | did not advance | | | |
| Vuk Čelić | 800 m freestyle | —N/a | | | | 8:14.95 | 12 |
| Vuk Čelić | 200 m backstroke | 2:05.99 | 19 | —N/a | | did not advance | |

Girls

| Athlete | Event | Heat | | Final | |
| Athlete | Event | Time | Rank | Time | Rank |
|---|---|---|---|---|---|
| Jovana Đurić | 800 m freestyle | —N/a | | 9:02.57 | 19 |
| Nađa Veličković | 200 m backstroke | 2:23.05 | 25 | did not advance | |

== Taekwondo ==
Boys

| Athlete | Event | Round of 16 | Quarterfinals | Semifinals | Final | Rank |
| Athlete | Event | Opposition Result | Opposition Result | Opposition Result | Opposition Result | Rank |
|---|---|---|---|---|---|---|
| Miloš Šućur | −63 kg | Bye | Nava (MEX); L 6 - 7 | did not advance | | 5 |
| Igor Glišin | +73 kg | Bye | Miangue (FRA); L 5 - 12 | did not advance | | 5 |

Girls

| Athlete | Event | Round of 16 | Quarterfinals | Semifinals | Final | Rank |
| Athlete | Event | Opposition Result | Opposition Result | Opposition Result | Opposition Result | Rank |
|---|---|---|---|---|---|---|
| Tijana Bogdanović | −55 kg | Folgmann (GER); W 16 - 12 | Kudashova (RUS); L 6 - 18 (PTG) | did not advance | | 5 |

== Tennis ==
Serbia qualified two athletes based on the 9 June 2014 ITF World Junior Rankings.

Singles

| Athlete | Event | Round of 32 | Round of 16 | Quarterfinals | Semifinals | Final / BM | Rank |
| Athlete | Event | Opposition Score | Opposition Score | Opposition Score | Opposition Score | Opposition Score | Rank |
|---|---|---|---|---|---|---|---|
| Petar Čonkić | Boys' Singles | Bourchier (AUS); L 1-2; 7–5, 0–6, 3–6 | did not advance | | | | 17 |
| Ivana Jorović | Girls' Singles | Heinová (CZE); L 0-2; 2–6, 6^{3}-7^{7} | did not advance | | | | 17 |

Doubles

| Athletes | Event | Round of 32 | Round of 16 | Quarterfinals | Semifinals | Final / BM | Rank |
| Athletes | Event | Opposition Score | Opposition Score | Opposition Score | Opposition Score | Opposition Score | Rank |
|---|---|---|---|---|---|---|---|
| Petar Čonkić (SRB); Daniel Appelgren (SWE) | Boys' Doubles | —N/a | Biró (HUN); Geens (BEL); L 1-2; 1–6, 7^{7}-6^{5}, [3]-[10] | did not advance | | | 9 |
| Ivana Jorović (SRB); Jil Teichmann (SUI) | Girls' Doubles | —N/a | Ostapenko (LAT); Paražinskaitė (LTU); L 1-2; 3–6, 7^{7}-6^{4}, [8]-[10] | did not advance | | | 9 |
| Ivana Jorović (SRB); Petar Čonkić (SRB) | Mixed Doubles | Ostapenko (LAT); Appelgren (SWE); L 1-2; 1–6, 6–2, [5]-[10] | did not advance | | | | 17 |

== Weightlifting ==
Serbia was given a reallocation spot to compete.

Boys

| Athlete | Event | Snatch | | Clean & jerk | | Total | Rank |
| Athlete | Event | Result | Rank | Result | Rank | Total | Rank |
|---|---|---|---|---|---|---|---|
| Tamaš Kajdoči | +85 kg | 150 | 2 | 186 | 2 | 336 | 2nd place, silver medalist(s) |

== Wrestling ==
Serbia qualified one athlete based on its performance at the 2014 European Cadet Championships.

Key:

- VT - Victory by Fall.
- PP - Decision by Points - the loser with technical points.
- PO - Decision by Points - the loser without technical points.

Boys

| Athlete | Event | Group stage | | | | Final / RM | Rank |
| Athlete | Event | Opposition Score | Opposition Score | Opposition Score | Rank | Opposition Score | Rank |
|---|---|---|---|---|---|---|---|
| Jovan Kalaba | Greco-Roman -85kg | Milov (BUL); L 0-4 ^{ST} | Pal (IND); L 0-4 ^{VT} | Ahmed (EGY); L 0-4 ^{ST} | 4 Q | McMoore (ASA); W 4-0 | 7 |
