= Haiti at the 2014 Summer Youth Olympics =

- IOC code: HAI
- NOC: Comité Olympique Haïtien

in Nanjing
- Competitors: 3 in 2 sports
- Medals: Gold 0 Silver 0 Bronze 0 Total 0

Summer Youth Olympics appearances
- 2010; 2014; 2018

Haiti competed at the 2014 Summer Youth Olympics, in Nanjing, China from 16 August to 28 August 2014.

== Athletics ==
Haiti qualified two athletes.

Qualification Legend: Q=Final A (medal); qB=Final B (non-medal); qC=Final C (non-medal); qD=Final D (non-medal); qE=Final E (non-medal)

Boys
Track & road events

Athlete	Event	Heats		Final	
Athlete	Event	Result	Rank	Result	Rank
Christian Charles	100 m	12.01	29 qD	DNS	

Girls
Field events

Athlete	Event	Qualification		Final	
Athlete	Event	Distance	Rank	Distance	Rank
Masterline Saint Vil	Long jump	4.43	15 qB	4.37	15

== Judo ==
Haiti was given a quota to compete by the tripartite committee.

Individual

Athlete	Event	Round of 32	Round of 16	Quarterfinals	Semifinals	Rep 1	Rep 2	Rep 3	Rep 3	Final / BM	Rank
Athlete	Event	Opposition Result	Opposition Result	Opposition Result	Opposition Result	Opposition Result	Opposition Result	Opposition Result	Opposition Result	Opposition Result	Rank
Edelene Mondely	Girls' -52 kg	Bye	P Acevedo (PUR); L 0001 – 1013	did not advance		X Liu (CHN); L 0020 – 1000	did not advance				17

Team

Athletes	Event	Round of 16	Quarterfinals	Semifinals	Final	Rank
Athletes	Event	Opposition Result	Opposition Result	Opposition Result	Opposition Result	Rank
Team Berghmans; Anri Egutidze (POR); Edlene Mondelly (HAI); Michaela Polleres (AUT); Pamela Quizhpi (ECU); Domenik Schonefeldt (GER); Adela Szarzecova (CZE); Wu Zhiqiang (CHN)	Mixed Team	Team Kerr (MIX); W 4 – 2	Team Xian (MIX); L 3 – 4	did not advance		5
