= Tobias Franek =

Austrian BMX rider

Personal information
- Born: 29 July 1996 (age 30) Eisenstadt, Austria

Cycling career
- Sport: Cycling
- Current team: Austria
- Discipline: BMX racing
- Role: Rider

Tobias Franek (born 29 July 1996) is an Austrian male BMX rider, representing his nation at international competitions. He competed in the time trial event at the 2015 UCI BMX World Championships.
