= Adonis Diaz =

American judoka (born 1996)

Personal information
- Born: May 9, 1996 (age 30)
- Occupation: Judoka

Sport
- Country: United States
- Sport: Judo
- Weight class: –60 kg

Achievements and titles
- World Champ.: R32 (2021)
- Pan American Champ.: (2013, 2020)
Medal record
Men's judo
Representing United States
Pan American Games
Bronze medal – third place	2019 Lima	–60 kg
Pan American Championships
Silver medal – second place	2013 San José	–55 kg
Silver medal – second place	2020 Guadalajara	–60 kg
Bronze medal – third place	2017 Panama City	–60 kg
Bronze medal – third place	2018 San José	–60 kg
IJF Grand Prix
Silver medal – second place	2018 Zagreb	–60 kg
Bronze medal – third place	2018 Antalya	–60 kg
Bronze medal – third place	2019 Montreal	–60 kg

Profile at external databases
- IJF: 8045
- JudoInside.com: 79526
- Updated on 29 November 2022

Adonis Diaz (born May 9, 1996) is an American judoka. He won one of the bronze medals in the men's 60 kg event at the 2019 Pan American Games held in Lima, Peru.

== Career ==
In 2013, he won the silver medal in the men's 55 kg event at the Pan American Judo Championships held in San José, Costa Rica.

He won one of the bronze medals in the mixed team event at the 2014 Summer Youth Olympics held in Nanjing, China. He also competed in the boys' 66 kg event.

He competed in the men's 60 kg event at the 2018 World Judo Championships held in Baku, Azerbaijan. In 2019, he competed in the men's 60 kg event at the 2019 World Judo Championships held in Tokyo, Japan.

In 2020, he won the silver medal in the men's 60 kg event at the Pan American Judo Championships held in Guadalajara, Mexico.

== Achievements ==
Year	Tournament	Place	Weight class
2019	Pan American Games	3rd	–60 kg
