= Mixed-NOCs at the 2014 Summer Youth Olympics =

Mixed-NOC teams participated under the Olympic flag

Teams made up of athletes representing different National Olympic Committees (NOCs), called mixed-NOCs teams, participated in the 2014 Summer Youth Olympics. These teams participated in either events composed entirely of mixed-NOCs teams, or in events which saw the participation of mixed-NOCs teams and non-mixed-NOCs teams. When a mixed-NOCs team won a medal, the Olympic flag was raised rather than a national flag; if a mixed-NOCs team won gold, the Olympic anthem would be played instead of national anthems. A total of 17 events with Mixed NOCs were held.

== Background ==
The concept of mixed-NOCs was introduced in the 2010 Summer Youth Olympics, in which athletes from different nations would compete in the same team, often representing their continent. This is in contrast to the Mixed team (IOC code: ZZX) found at early senior Olympic Games.

== Medal summary ==
The following medal summary lists all nations whose athletes won a medal while competing for a mixed-NOCs team. If there is more than one athlete from the same nation on a medal-winning team, only one medal of that colour is credited. The summary shows how many events at which a nation had an athlete in a medal-winning mixed-NOCs team.

Mixed-NOCs medals — summary by athletes' nations
* Host nation (China)

Rank	Nation	Gold	Silver	Bronze	Total
1	Russia	2	3	0	5
2	Ukraine	2	1	3	6
3	France	2	1	2	5
4	Great Britain	2	1	1	4
5	Germany	2	1	0	3
6	Hong Kong	2	0	0	2
6	Netherlands	2	0	0	2
6	Portugal	2	0	0	2
6	Uzbekistan	2	0	0	2
10	Hungary	1	3	1	5
11	Italy	1	2	3	6
12	Argentina	1	2	1	4
12	China*	1	2	1	4
12	Japan	1	2	1	4
15	Egypt	1	2	0	3
15	Mexico	1	2	0	3
17	Australia	1	1	3	5
18	Poland	1	1	2	4
18	South Korea	1	1	2	4
20	Belarus	1	1	0	2
20	Malaysia	1	1	0	2
22	Comoros	1	0	1	2
22	Sweden	1	0	1	2
24	British Virgin Islands	1	0	0	1
24	Bulgaria	1	0	0	1
24	Denmark	1	0	0	1
24	Ireland	1	0	0	1
24	Norway	1	0	0	1
24	Philippines	1	0	0	1
24	Puerto Rico	1	0	0	1
24	Romania	1	0	0	1
24	Switzerland	1	0	0	1
24	Thailand	1	0	0	1
24	Venezuela	1	0	0	1
35	Chinese Taipei	0	2	1	3
36	Brazil	0	2	0	2
37	United States	0	1	2	3
38	Bahrain	0	1	1	2
38	Spain	0	1	1	2
38	Uruguay	0	1	1	2
41	Burundi	0	1	0	1
41	Chile	0	1	0	1
41	Montenegro	0	1	0	1
41	Paraguay	0	1	0	1
41	Serbia	0	1	0	1
41	Singapore	0	1	0	1
41	Zambia	0	1	0	1
48	Guatemala	0	0	2	2
48	Latvia	0	0	2	2
50	Austria	0	0	1	1
50	Canada	0	0	1	1
50	Cayman Islands	0	0	1	1
50	Croatia	0	0	1	1
50	Czech Republic	0	0	1	1
50	Dominican Republic	0	0	1	1
50	Ecuador	0	0	1	1
50	El Salvador	0	0	1	1
50	Ethiopia	0	0	1	1
50	Finland	0	0	1	1
50	Greece	0	0	1	1
50	Israel	0	0	1	1
50	Lithuania	0	0	1	1
50	Luxembourg	0	0	1	1
50	Maldives	0	0	1	1
50	New Zealand	0	0	1	1
50	Peru	0	0	1	1
50	Slovenia	0	0	1	1
50	Sri Lanka	0	0	1	1
Totals (68 entries)		43	42	51	136

== Archery ==
Athletes were paired off based on their performance during the ranking round of their respective individual events. For example, the 1st ranked boy was paired with the 32nd ranked girl and the 2nd ranked boy was paired with the 31st ranked girl and so on.

Event	Gold	Silver	Bronze
Mixed team	Li Jiaman (CHN); Luis Gabriel Moreno (PHI)	Cynthia Freywald (GER); Muhamad Zarif Syahiir Zolkepeli (MAS)	Mirjam Tuokkola (FIN); Eric Peters (CAN)

== Athletics ==
Games	Gold	Silver	Bronze
8×100 m relay	Team 034; Merten Howe (GER); Daou Bacar Aboubacar (COM); Trae Williams (AUS); Witthawat Thumcha (THA); Maria Simancas (VEN); Tatiana Blagoveshchenskaia (RUS); Lakeisha Ashley Warner (IVB); Ioana Teodora Gheorghe (ROU)	Team 038; Ekaterina Alekseeva (RUS); Oleksandr Malosilov (UKR); Rachel Pace (AUS); Mohamed Saad (BRN); Chinne Okoronkwo (USA); Amedee Manirakiza (BDI); Coralie Gassama (FRA); Sydney Siame (ZAM)	Team 017; Sam Geddes (AUS); Michaela Hruba (CZE); Noel-Aman Del Cerro Vilalta (ESP); Martin Nicolas Castanares Mariano (URU); Wogene Sebisibe Sidamo (ETH); Hussain Shahudhaan Fahumee (MDV); Dhakirina Fatima (COM); Salwa Naser (BRN)

== Badminton ==
Each doubles pair was determine through a draw where an athlete of one gender seeded 1-16 was paired with another athlete seeded 17-32 of the opposite gender.

Event	Gold	Silver	Bronze
Mixed doubles	Cheam June Wei (MAS); Ng Tsz Yau (HKG)	Kanta Tsuneyama (JPN); Lee Chia-hsin (TPE)	Sachin Dias (SRI); He Bingjiao (CHN)

== Cycling ==
NOCs who qualified only two men or women lots were drawn to form combined teams.

Event	Gold	Silver	Bronze
Mixed team relay	Medals in this event were won by individual NOCs		

== Diving ==
Event	Gold	Silver	Bronze
Mixed team	Alejandra Orozco (MEX); Daniel Jensen (NOR)	Wu Shengping (CHN); Mohab Elkordy (EGY)	Garcia Laydon Mahoney (USA); Pylyp Tkachenko (UKR)

== Equestrian ==
Athletes were grouped based on their continental origins. For continents with not enough athletes riders from nearby continents were used (e.g. Ecuador for North America and Hong Kong, Iran and Malaysia for Australasia).

Event	Gold	Silver	Bronze
Team Jumping	Europe; Matias Alvaro (ITA); Michael Duffy (IRL); Jake Saywell (GBR); Filip Agren (SWE); Lisa Nooren (NED)	South America; Francisco Calvelo Martinez (URU); Antoine Porte (CHI); Valeria Jimenez Caballero (PAR); Martina Campi (ARG); Bianca de Souza Rodrigues (BRA)	North America; Polly Serpell (CAY); Macarena Chiriboga Granja (ECU); Sabrina Rivera Meza (ESA); Stefanie Brand (GUA); María Gabriela Brugal (DOM)

== Fencing ==
Nine continental teams were created containing athletes from both genders and all three weapons. Athletes were chosen for each team based on their performance from the individual events. For example, the top ranked athletes from Asia-Oceania in each event were grouped into Asia-Oceania 1 while the second highest ranked athletes from that continent were placed into Asia-Oceania 2.

Event	Gold	Silver	Bronze
Mixed Team Event	Asia-Oceania 1 Chien Kei Hsu Albert (HKG); Choi Chun Yin Ryan (HKG); Misaki Emura (JPN); Kim Dongju (KOR); Lee Sinhee (KOR); Karin Miyawaki (JPN)	Europe 1 Patrik Esztergályos (HUN); Marta Martyanova (RUS); Ivan Ilin (RUS); Eleonora De Marchi (ITA); Andrzej Rządkowski (POL); Alina Moseyko (RUS)	Europe 2 Chiara Crovari (ITA); Marios Giakoumatos (GRE); Linus Islas Flygare (SWE); Åsa Linde (SWE); Enguerand Roger (FRA); Anna Szymczak (POL)

== Golf ==
Initially golf was to not have mixed NOC entrants, however, two teams of mixed nations were created due to not having a partner from their own nation.

== Judo ==
13 teams were created and named after judo legends. Teams of 7 or 8 athletes were made by categorizing all athletes by weight and drawing one athlete from each weight group. Other considerations in the draw were medalists were to be evenly separated among all teams and no two athletes from the same nation were on the same team.

Games	Gold	Silver	Bronze
Mixed Team	Team Rouge; Morgane Duchene (FRA); Ayelen Elizeche (ARG); Adrian Gandia (PUR); Mikhail Igolnikov (RUS); Lisa Mullenberg (NED); Maria Siderot (POR); Sukhrob Tursunov (UZB)	Team Geesink; Layana Colman (BRA); Nemanja Majdov (SRB); Dzmitry Minkou (BLR); Ryu Seunghwan (KOR); Ivana Sunjevic (MNE); Anastasya Turcheva (RUS); Wang Yu-Jyun (TPE)	Team Douillet; Gustavo Basile (ARG); Marko Bubanja (AUT); Adonis Diaz (USA); Liudmyla Drozdova (UKR); Lee Hye-kyeong (KOR); Brigita Matic (CRO); Peter Miles (GBR)
Mixed Team	Team Rouge; Morgane Duchene (FRA); Ayelen Elizeche (ARG); Adrian Gandia (PUR); Mikhail Igolnikov (RUS); Lisa Mullenberg (NED); Maria Siderot (POR); Sukhrob Tursunov (UZB)	Team Geesink; Layana Colman (BRA); Nemanja Majdov (SRB); Dzmitry Minkou (BLR); Ryu Seunghwan (KOR); Ivana Sunjevic (MNE); Anastasya Turcheva (RUS); Wang Yu-Jyun (TPE)	Team Xian; Hifumi Abe (JPN); Chiara Carminucci (ITA); Naomi de Bruine (AUS); Jolan Florimont (FRA); Brillith Gamarra (PER); Felix Penning (LUX); Marusa Stangar (SLO); Idan Vardi (ISR)

== Modern pentathlon ==
Event	Gold	Silver	Bronze
Mixed relay	Maria Teixeira (POR); Anton Kuznetsov (UKR)	Anna Zs Tóth (HUN); Ricardo Vera (MEX)	Aurora Tognetti (ITA); Gilung Park (KOR)

== Shooting ==
Event	Gold	Silver	Bronze
Mixed Teams' 10m Air Rifle	Hadir Mekhimar (EGY); István Péni (HUN)	Fernanda Russo (ARG); Santos Valdés (MEX)	Viktoriya Sukhorukova (UKR); Shao-Chuan Lu (TPE)
Mixed Teams' 10m Air Pistol	Lidia Nencheva (BUL); Vladimir Svechnikov (UZB)	Teh Xiu Yi (SIN); Ahmed Mohamed (EGY)	Agate Rasmane (LAT); Wilmar Madrid (GUA)

== Table tennis ==
Athletes from nations that were unable to create a team by themselves were first paired off by continent and then intercontinental. The highest ranked boy from one continent was paired with the highest ranked girl from the same continent and so on.

Event	Gold	Silver	Bronze
Mixed team	Medals in this event were won by individual NOCs		

== Tennis ==
Athletes from nations that were unable to create a doubles team by themselves were first paired off by region, then zone and then intercontinental. The highest ranked boy from one area was paired with the highest ranked girl from the same area and so on.

Event	Gold	Silver	Bronze
Boys' doubles	Medals in this event were won by individual NOCs		
Girls' doubles	Anhelina Kalinina (UKR); Iryna Shymanovich (BLR)	Won by a team representing the individual NOC of Russia	Jeļena Ostapenko (LAT); Akvilė Paražinskaitė (LTU)
Mixed doubles	Jil Teichmann (SUI); Jan Zieliński (POL)	Ye Qiuyu (CHN); Jumpei Yamasaki (JPN)	Fanni Stollár (HUN); Kamil Majchrzak (POL)

== Triathlon ==
Based on their performance from the individual events athletes were grouped together by continent while the remaining athletes were grouped together as intercontinental teams. For example, the top two ranked boys and top two girls from Europe were grouped together as Europe 1 while the next two ranked boys and next two ranked girls from Europe were grouped together as Europe 2 and so on.

Event	Gold	Silver	Bronze
Mixed Relay	Europe 1 Ben Dijkstra (GBR); Emil Deleuran Hansen (DEN); Émilie Morier (FRA); Kristin Ranwig (GER)	Europe 3 Carmen Gomez Cortes (ESP); Bence Lehmann (HUN); Sian Rainsley (GBR); Giulio Soldati (ITA)	Oceania 1 Brittany Dutton (AUS); Daniel Hoy (NZL); Elizabeth Stannard (NZL); Jack van Stekelenburg (AUS)

== See also ==
- 2014 Summer Youth Olympics medal table
- Mixed-NOCs at the Youth Olympics
