= Japan at the 2014 Summer Youth Olympics =

- IOC code: JPN
- NOC: Japanese Olympic Committee
- Website: www.joc.or.jp

in Nanjing
- Competitors: 78 in 21 sports
- Flag bearer: Akane Yamaguchi (Badminton)
- Medals Ranked 5th: Gold 7 Silver 9 Bronze 5 Total 21

Summer Youth Olympics appearances (overview)
- 2010; 2014; 2018; 2026

Japan competed at the 2014 Summer Youth Olympics, in Nanjing, China from 16 August to 28 August 2014.

== Medalists ==
Medal	Name	Sport	Event	Date
Gold	Hifumi Abe	Judo	Boys' 66 kg	17 August
Gold	Ippei Watanabe	Swimming	Boys' 200 m breaststroke	20 August
Gold	Minoru Onogawa	Athletics	Boys' 10 km walk	24 August
Gold	Nozomi Musembi Takamatsu	Athletics	Girls' 3000 m	24 August
Gold	Kenya Yuasa	Gymnastics	Boys' horizontal bar	24 August
Gold	Mayu Mukaida	Wrestling	Girls' freestyle 52 kg	26 August
Gold	Yajuro Yamasaki	Wrestling	Boys' freestyle 76 kg	27 August
Silver	Karin Miyawaki	Fencing	Girls' foil	17 August
Silver	Yuto Muramatsu	Table tennis	Boys' singles	20 August
Silver	Rana Nakano	Gymnastics	Girls' trampoline	21 August
Silver	Akane Yamaguchi	Badminton	Girls' singles	22 August
Silver	Kenta Oshima	Athletics	Boys' 100 m	23 August
Silver	Yuji Hiramatsu	Athletics	Boys' high jump	23 August
Silver	Kenya Yuasa	Gymnastics	Boys' floor	23 August
Silver	Miyu Kato; Yuto Muramatsu	Table tennis	Mixed team	23 August
Silver	Toshihiro Suzuki	Boxing	Boys' 64 kg	27 August
Bronze	Honoka Yamauchi	Judo	Girls' 44 kg	17 August
Bronze	Sae Miyakawa	Gymnastics	Girls' vault	23 August
Bronze	Ryotaro Matsumura; Jumpei Yamasaki	Tennis	Boys' doubles	23 August
Bronze	Nagisa Mori	Athletics	Girls' javelin throw	25 August
Bronze	Subaru Murata	Boxing	Boys' 49 kg	25 August

Medals by sport
Sport	1st place, gold medalist(s)	2nd place, silver medalist(s)	3rd place, bronze medalist(s)	Total
Athletics	2	2	1	5
Wrestling	2	0	0	2
Gymnastics	1	2	1	4
Judo	1	0	1	2
Swimming	1	0	0	1
Table tennis	0	2	0	2
Boxing	0	1	1	2
Badminton	0	1	0	1
Fencing	0	1	0	1
Tennis	0	0	1	1
Total	7	9	5	21

Medals by day
Day	1st place, gold medalist(s)	2nd place, silver medalist(s)	3rd place, bronze medalist(s)	Total
August 17	1	1	1	3
August 18	0	0	0	0
August 19	0	0	0	0
August 20	1	1	0	2
August 21	0	1	0	1
August 22	0	1	0	1
August 23	0	4	2	6
August 24	3	0	0	3
August 25	0	0	2	2
August 26	1	0	0	1
August 27	1	1	0	2
Total	7	9	5	21

== Archery ==
Japan qualified a two archers from its performance at the 2013 World Archery Youth Championships.

Individual

Athlete	Event	Ranking round		Round of 32	Round of 16	Quarterfinals	Semifinals	Final / BM	Rank
Athlete	Event	Score	Seed	Opposition Score	Opposition Score	Opposition Score	Opposition Score	Opposition Score	Rank
Hiroki Muto	Boys' Individual	674	10	Komar (UKR); W 6–4	Mayr (GER); W 7–1	Verma (IND); L 2–6	did not advance		6
Miasa Koike	Girls' Individual	618	22	Gotuaco (PHI); W 6–2	Oleksiuk (UKR); W 6–5	Li (CHN); L 0–6	did not advance		8

Team

Athletes	Event	Ranking round		Round of 32	Round of 16	Quarterfinals	Semifinals	Final / BM	Rank
Athletes	Event	Score	Seed	Opposition Score	Opposition Score	Opposition Score	Opposition Score	Opposition Score	Rank
Sughrakhanim Mugabilzada (AZE); Hiroki Muto (JPN)	Mixed Team	1292	1	Zinsou (BEN); Lee (KOR); W 6–2	Rivera (MEX); Koenig (FRA); W 5–4	Li (CHN); Moreno (PHI); L 1–5	did not advance		8
Miasa Koike (JPN); Bradley Denny (GBR)	Mixed Team	1288	10	Marin (ESP); El Ghrari (LBA); W 5–4	Machado (BRA); Szafran (POL); W 6–2	Freywald (GER); Zolkepeli (MAS); L 4–5	did not advance		5

== Athletics ==
Japan qualified 13 athletes.

Qualification Legend: Q=Final A (medal); qB=Final B (non-medal); qC=Final C (non-medal); qD=Final D (non-medal); qE=Final E (non-medal)

Boys
Track & road events

Athlete	Event	Heats		Final	
Athlete	Event	Result	Rank	Result	Rank
Kenta Oshima	100 m	10.62	3 Q	10.57	2nd place, silver medalist(s)
Jun Yamashita	200 m	21.11 PB	4 Q	21.62	6
Nao Kanai	110 m hurdles	14.03	16 qC	14.08	13
Minoru Onogawa	10 km walk	—N/a		42:03.64 PB	1st place, gold medalist(s)

Field Events

Athlete	Event	Qualification		Final	
Athlete	Event	Distance	Rank	Distance	Rank
Yuji Hiramatsu	High jump	2.10	4 Q	2.14 PB	2nd place, silver medalist(s)
Yume Ando	Discus throw	55.87	6 Q	57.36	4

Girls
Track & road events

Athlete	Event	Heats		Final	
Athlete	Event	Result	Rank	Result	Rank
Tomomi Kawamura	200 m	25.10	12 qB	25.18	13
Hina Takahashi	800 m	2:09.59	7 Q	2:09.96	8
Nozomi Musembi Takamatsu	3000 m	9:08.01	4 Q	9:01.58	1st place, gold medalist(s)
Nana Fujimori	100 m hurdles	13.83	9 qB	DSQ	
Sayori Matsumoto	5 km walk	—N/a		23:54.71	4

Field events

Athlete	Event	Qualification		Final	
Athlete	Event	Distance	Rank	Distance	Rank
Misaki Morota	Pole vault	3.40	11 qB	3.50	11
Nagisa Mori	Javelin throw	50.72 PB	5 Q	52.27 PB	3rd place, bronze medalist(s)

== Badminton ==
Japan qualified two athletes based on the 2 May 2014 BWF Junior World Rankings.

Singles

Athlete	Event	Group stage				Quarterfinal	Semifinal	Final / BM	Rank
Athlete	Event	Opposition Score	Opposition Score	Opposition Score	Rank	Opposition Score	Opposition Score	Opposition Score	Rank
Kanta Tsuneyama	Boys' Singles	Mihigo (UGA); W 2–0 (21–3, 21–5)	Jakowczuk (POL); W 2–0 (21–12, 21–10)	Penalver (ESP); W 2–0 (21–7, 21–17)	1	Ginting (INA); L 1–2 (8–21, 21–14, 12–21)	did not advance		
Akane Yamaguchi	Girls' Singles	Cadeau (SEY); W 2–0 (21–2, 21–1)	Hendahewa (SRI); W 2–0 (21–13, 21–6)	Blichfeldt (DEN); W 2–0 (21–12, 22–20)	1	Hartawan (INA); W 2–1 (21–6, 18–21, 21–11)	Lee (TPE); W 2–1 (21–11, 18–21, 21–15)	He (CHN); L 1–2 (24–22, 21–23, 17–21)	2nd place, silver medalist(s)

Doubles

Athlete	Event	Group stage				Quarterfinal	Semifinal	Final / BM	Rank
Athlete	Event	Opposition Score	Opposition Score	Opposition Score	Rank	Opposition Score	Opposition Score	Opposition Score	Rank
Lee Chia-hsin (TPE); Kanta Tsuneyama (JPN)	Mixed Doubles	Lee (HKG); Konieczna (POL); W 2–1 (15–21, 21–8, 21–15)	Jakowczuk (POL); Azurmendi (ESP); W 2–0 (21–10, 21–10)	Dhami (NEP); Ongbumrungpan (THA); W 2–0 (21–8, 21–13)	1	Shi (CHN); Lai (AUS); W 2–0 (21–18, 21–9)	Angodavidanalage (SRI); He (CHN); W 2–1 (21–14, 7–21, 21–19)	Cheam (MAS); Ng (HKG); L 0–2 (14–21, 21–23)	2nd place, silver medalist(s)
Akane Yamaguchi (JPN); Ruslan Sarsekenov (UKR)	Mixed Doubles	Joshi (IND); Kabelo (BOT); W 2–0 (21–17, 21–19)	Abdelhakim (EGY); Mitsova (BUL); W 2–0 (21–13, 21–16)	Krapez (SLO); Chen (NED); L 0–2 (19–21, 17–21)	2	did not advance			

== Boxing ==
Japan qualified three boxers based on its performance at the 2014 AIBA Youth World Championships

Boys

Athlete	Event	Preliminaries	Semifinals	Final / RM	Rank
Athlete	Event	Opposition Result	Opposition Result	Opposition Result	Rank
Subaru Murata	-49 kg	Bye	Latipov (UZB); L 1–2	Bronze Medal Bout Aikhynbay (KAZ); W 2–1	3rd place, bronze medalist(s)
Goh Hosaka	-60 kg	Bye	Limonta (CUB); L 0–3	Bronze Medal Bout Könnyű (HUN); L 0–3	4
Toshihiro Suzuki	-64 kg	Bye	Tumenov (RUS); W DISQ	Arecchia (ITA); L w/o	2nd place, silver medalist(s)

== Canoeing ==
Japan qualified one boat based on its performance at the 2013 World Junior Canoe Sprint and Slalom Championships.

Girls

Athlete	Event	Qualification		Repechage		Round of 16		Quarterfinals	Semifinals	Final / BM	Rank
Athlete	Event	Time	Rank	Time	Rank	Time	Rank	Opposition Result	Opposition Result	Opposition Result	Rank
Wakana Moriyama	K1 slalom										
Wakana Moriyama	K1 sprint										

== Cycling ==
Japan qualified a boys' and girls' team based on its ranking issued by the UCI.

Team

Athletes	Event	Cross-Country Eliminator		Time Trial			BMX		Cross-Country Race			Road Race			Total Pts	Rank
Athletes	Event	Rank	Points	Time	Rank	Points	Rank	Points	Time	Rank	Points	Time	Rank	Points	Total Pts	Rank
Masahiro Ishigami; Masaki Yamada	Boys' Team															
Takaho Nakashima; Kiyoka Sakaguchi	Girls' Team															

Mixed Relay

Athletes	Event	Cross-Country Girls' Race	Cross-Country Boys' Race	Boys' Road Race	Girls' Road Race	Total Time	Rank
Takaho Nakashima; Masaki Yamada; Masahiro Ishigami; Kiyoka Sakaguchi	Mixed Team Relay						

== Equestrian ==
Japan qualified a rider.

Athlete	Horse	Event	Round 1		Round 2			Total	
Athlete	Horse	Event	Penalties	Rank	Penalties	Total	Rank	Penalties	Rank
Sayaka Fujiwara	Lasino	Individual Jumping							
Asia; Li Yaofeng (CHN); Sayaka Fujiwara (JPN); Igor Kozubaev (KGZ); Hamad Al Qadi (QAT); Hisham Alsuwayni (KSA)	Uriah; Lasino; Fever; Fernando; Quick Sylver	Team Jumping	12; ~~13~~; ~~13~~; 0; 8	6	~~8~~; 0; ~~EL~~; 4; 4	28	6	28	6

== Fencing ==
Japan qualified three athletes based on its performance at the 2014 FIE Cadet World Championships.

Girls

Athlete	Event	Pool Round	Seed	Round of 16	Quarterfinals	Semifinals	Final / BM	Rank
Athlete	Event	Opposition Score	Seed	Opposition Score	Opposition Score	Opposition Score	Opposition Score	Rank
Miho Yoshimura	Épée	Pool 1 Nixon (USA); L 1–5 de Marchi (ITA) Simms-Lymn (JAM) Brovko (UKR)	3	Alqudah (JOR); W 15–9	Lee (KOR); L 14–15	did not advance		6
Karin Miyawaki	Foil	Massialas (USA); W 5–3; Guillaume (FRA) Huang (CHN) Cecchini (BRA) Pásztor (HUN) Clavijo (BOL); W 5–0				Martyanova (RUS); L	Massialas (USA); L 6–7	2nd place, silver medalist(s)
Misaki Emura	Sabre	Gkountoura (GRE) Köse (TUR) Moseyko (RUS) Matuszak (POL) Koutogle (TOG); W 5–1; Ciss (SEN); W 5–3		Koutogle (TOG); W 15–7	Gkountoura (GRE); W 15–13	Crovari (ITA); L	Záhonyi (HUN); L 13–15	4

Mixed Team

Athletes	Event	Round of 16	Quarterfinals	Semifinals / PM	Final / PM	Rank
Athletes	Event	Opposition Score	Opposition Score	Opposition Score	Opposition Score	Rank
Asia-Oceania 1 Chien Kei Hsu Albert; Hong Kong; Choi Chun Yin Ryan; Hong Kong; Misaki Emura; Japan; Kim Dongju; South Korea; Lee Sinhee; South Korea; Karin Miyawaki; Japan	Mixed Team		Europe 4 W 30–22	Europe 2 W 30–29	Europe 1 W	1st place, gold medalist(s)

== Field hockey ==
Japan qualified a girls' team based on its performance at the 2013 Under 16 Asian Cup.

=== Girls' tournament ===
Roster

- Yu Asai
- Chiko Fujibayashi
- Kimika Hoshi
- Mami Karino
- Motomi Kawamura
- Miki Kozuka
- Mori Kanon
- Eika Nakamura
- Moeka Tsubouchi

Group Stage

Pos	Team	Pld	W	D	L	GF	GA	GD	Pts	Qualification
1	Netherlands	4	4	0	0	46	1	+45	12	Quarterfinals
2	Japan	4	2	1	1	42	16	+26	7	Quarterfinals
3	Argentina	4	2	1	1	34	9	+25	7	Quarterfinals
4	South Africa	4	1	0	3	8	34	−26	3	Quarterfinals
5	Fiji	4	0	0	4	3	73	−70	0	

Source: FIH
Rules for classification: 1) points; 2) goal difference; 3) goals scored; 4) head-to-head result.

17 August 2014
20:30

Japan	12–0	South Africa
Kawamura 2', 9', 9'; Mori 7', 17'; Kozuka 11', 12', 24'; Asai 24', 36'; Karino 28'; Hoshi 31'	Report

Umpires:
Liu Lijie (CHN)
Ana Escalante (MEX)

19 August 2014
16:30

Japan	1–12	Netherlands
Mori 24'	Report	Fillet 5', 8', 13'; Veen 12', 20', 21'; Matla 12', 24'; Wijsman 17', 28'; Kerstholt 23', 35'

Umpires:
Ivona Makar (CRO)
Ana Escalante (MEX)

20 August 2014
18:00

Fiji	1–26	Japan
Bennion 36'	Report	Asai 1', 7', 25', 34'; Kawamura 1', 3', 14', 15', 20', 28'; Mori 4', 11', 16', 19', 30', 31', 33'; Fujibayashi 5', 29', 32'; Kozuka 8', 10', 35', 36'; Karino 11', 18'

Umpires:
Ivona Makar (CRO)
Lucy Townend (NZL)

21 August 2014
21:00

Japan	3–3	Argentina
Tsubouchi 7'; Asai 17', 36'	Report	Jankunas 2'; Retegui 21', 27'

Umpires:
Ana Faias (POR)
Tanja Schafer (RSA)

Quarterfinal

23 August 2014
18:00

Japan	7–1	New Zealand
Kozuka 2', 22', 36'; Mori 6', 20'; Tsubouchi 8'; Kawamura 31'	Report	Waddell 23'

Umpires:
Ana Faias (POR)
Emily Carroll (AUS)

Semifinal

24 August 2014
19:30

China	4–3	Japan
Zhang Lijia 4'; Zhang Xindan 10'; Zhang Jinrong 13', 19'	Report	Asai 1'; Mori 5', 12'

Umpires:
Emily Carroll (AUS)
Ana Faias (POR)

Bronze medal match

26 August 2014
19:00

Argentina	5–2	Japan 4th
Ortiz 13'; Guastavino 17'; Jankunas 20', 25', 35'	Report	Fujibayashi 27'; Mori 32'

Umpires:
Denise Pelletier (CAN)
Ivona Makar (CRO)

== Golf ==
Japan qualified one team of two athletes based on the 8 June 2014 IGF Combined World Amateur Golf Rankings.

Individual

Athlete	Event	Round 1		Round 2			Round 3			Total	
Athlete	Event	Score	Rank	Score	Total	Rank	Score	Total	Rank	Score	Rank
Ren Okazaki	Boys										
Maria Shinohara	Girls	69	1	74	143	4					

Team

Athletes	Event	Round 1 (Foursome)		Round 2 (Fourball)			Round 3 (Individual Stroke)				Total	
Athletes	Event	Score	Rank	Score	Total	Rank	Boy	Girl	Total	Rank	Score	Rank
Ren Okazaki; Maria Shinohara	Mixed										277 (−11)	7

== Gymnastics ==
=== Artistic Gymnastics ===
Japan qualified two athletes based on its performance at the 2014 Asian Artistic Gymnastics Championships.

Boys

Athlete	Event	Apparatus						Total	Rank
Athlete	Event	F	PH	R	V	PB	HB	Total	Rank
Kenya Yuasa	Qualification	13.950	12.400	13.050	14.100	13.900	13.800	81.200	5 Q
Kenya Yuasa	All-around	14.100	12.850	13.050	13.100	13.850	13.850	80.800	7
Kenya Yuasa	Floor							14.133	2nd place, silver medalist(s)
Kenya Yuasa	Parallel bars							13.533	6
Kenya Yuasa	Horizontal bar							13.700	1st place, gold medalist(s)

Girls

Athlete	Event	Apparatus				Total	Rank
Athlete	Event	F	V	UB	BB	Total	Rank
Sae Miyakawa	Qualification	11.300	14.750	12.850	12.000	50.900	9 Q
Sae Miyakawa	All-around	12.550	14.700	12.650	13.400	53.300	5
Sae Miyakawa	Vault					14.566	3rd place, bronze medalist(s)
Sae Miyakawa	Uneven bars					12.433	5

=== Rhythmic Gymnastics ===
Japan qualified one athlete based on its performance at the 2014 Asian Rhythmic Championships.

Individual

Athlete	Event	Qualification						Final					
Athlete	Event	Hoop	Ball	Clubs	Ribbon	Total	Rank	Hoop	Ball	Clubs	Ribbon	Total	Rank
Takana Tatsuzawa	Individual	11.650	12.250	12.700	12.050	48.650	12	did not advance					

=== Trampoline ===
Japan qualified one athlete based on its performance at the 2014 Asian Trampoline Championships.

Athlete	Event	Qualification				Final	
Athlete	Event	Routine 1	Routine 2	Total	Rank	Score	Rank
Rana Nakano	Girls	41.710	53.275	94.985	3 Q	52.370	2nd place, silver medalist(s)

== Judo ==
Japan qualified two athletes based on its performance at the 2013 Cadet World Judo Championships.

Individual

Athlete	Event	Round of 32	Round of 16	Quarterfinals	Semifinals	Repechage	Final / BM	Rank
Athlete	Event	Opposition Result	Opposition Result	Opposition Result	Opposition Result	Opposition Result	Opposition Result	Rank
Hifumi Abe	Boys' −66 kg	—N/a	Florimont (FRA); W 100–000	Gonzalez (COL); W 100–000	Sancho (CRC); W 100–000	Bye	Iadov (UKR); W 100–000	1st place, gold medalist(s)
Honoka Yamauchi	Girls' −44 kg	—N/a		Bye	Çakmaklı (TUR); L 000–001	Bye	Estefania Soriano (DOM); W 010–000	3rd place, bronze medalist(s)

Team

Athletes	Event	Round of 16	Quarterfinals	Semifinals	Final	Rank
Athletes	Event	Opposition Result	Opposition Result	Opposition Result	Opposition Result	Rank
Team Xian; Hifumi Abe (JPN); Chiara Carminucci (ITA); Naomi de Brune (AUS); Jolan Florimont (FRA); Brillith Gamarra (PER); Felix Penning (LUX); Marusa Stangar (SLO); Idan Vardi (ISR)	Mixed Team	Team Tani (MIX); W 7 – 0	Team Berghmans (MIX); W 4 – 3	Team Rouge (MIX); L 3 – 4	Did not advance	3rd place, bronze medalist(s)

== Rowing ==
Japan qualified one boat based on its performance at the Asian Qualification Regatta.

Athlete	Event	Heats		Repechage		Semifinals		Final	
Athlete	Event	Time	Rank	Time	Rank	Time	Rank	Time	Rank
Miharu Takashima	Girls' Single Sculls								

Qualification Legend: FA=Final A (medal); FB=Final B (non-medal); FC=Final C (non-medal); FD=Final D (non-medal); SA/B=Semifinals A/B; SC/D=Semifinals C/D; R=Repechage

== Rugby sevens ==
Japan qualified a boys' team based on its performance at the 2013 Rugby World Cup Sevens.

=== Boys' tournament ===
Roster

- Ryusuke Funahashi
- Shimin Kohara
- Toshiki Kuwayama
- Doga Maeda
- Eiya Miyazaki
- Kosuke Naka
- Shogo Nakano
- Yuhei Shimada
- Koki Takeyama
- Shun Tomonaga
- Kohei Toyoda
- Kazuki Yamada

Group Stage

Pos	Team	Pld	W	D	L	PF	PA	PD	Pts
1	Argentina	5	5	0	0	145	34	+111	15
2	France	5	4	0	1	98	55	+43	13
3	Fiji	5	2	0	3	82	70	+12	9
4	Kenya	5	2	0	3	68	107	−39	9
5	Japan	5	2	0	3	73	131	−58	9
6	United States	5	0	0	5	59	128	−69	5

17 August 2014
10:30

Fiji	29–5	Japan

Youth Olympic Sports Park

17 August 2014
18:30

Argentina	40–12	Japan

Youth Olympic Sports Park

18 August 2014
11:30

United States	10–22	Japan

Youth Olympic Sports Park

18 August 2014
17:30

Kenya	24–27	Japan

Youth Olympic Sports Park

19 August 2014
18:30

France	28–7	Japan

Youth Olympic Sports Park

Placing 5–6

19 August 2014
15:30

Japan 6th	12–29	United States

Youth Olympic Sports Park

== Sailing ==
Japan qualified two boats based on its performance at the Techno 293 Asian Continental Qualifiers.

Athlete	Event	Race											Net Points	Final Rank
Athlete	Event	1	2	3	4	5	6	7	8	9	10	M*	Net Points	Final Rank
Kensei Ikeda	Boys' Techno 293	3	7	2	7	(9)	8	7	Cancelled			43.00	34.00	7
Rina Niijima	Girls' Techno 293	11	4	7	9	9	(17)	10	Cancelled			67.00	50.00	7

== Shooting ==
Japan was given a wild card to compete.

Individual

Athlete	Event	Qualification		Final	
Athlete	Event	Points	Rank	Points	Rank
Tomohiko Hasegawa	Boys' 10m Air Rifle	611.2	10	did not advance	

Team

Athletes	Event	Qualification		Round of 16	Quarterfinals	Semifinals	Final / BM	Rank
Athletes	Event	Points	Rank	Opposition Result	Opposition Result	Opposition Result	Opposition Result	Rank
Tomohiko Hasegawa (JPN); Hebah Arzouqi (KUW)	Mixed Team 10m Air Rifle	802.4	19	did not advance				

== Swimming ==
Japan qualified eight swimmers.

Boys

Athlete	Event	Heat		Semifinal		Final	
Athlete	Event	Time	Rank	Time	Rank	Time	Rank
Yudai Amada	400 m freestyle	4:00.03	20	—N/a		Did not advance	
Yudai Amada	800 m freestyle	—N/a				8:32.43	22
Yudai Amada	200 m butterfly	2:04.89	15	—N/a		Did not advance	
Yuta Sato	50 m breaststroke	30.09	30	Did not advance			
Yuta Sato	100 m breaststroke	1:04.54	24	Did not advance			
Ippei Watanabe	50 m breaststroke	28.83	8 Q	28.74	6 Q	28.77	7
Ippei Watanabe	100 m breaststroke	1:02.26	3 Q	1:02.00	3 Q	1:01.66	4
Ippei Watanabe	200 m breaststroke	2:15.50	4 Q	—N/a		2:11.31	1st place, gold medalist(s)
Koki Tsunefuka	200 m breaststroke	2:17.28	11	—N/a		Did not advance	
Koki Tsunefuka	200 m individual medley	2:05.36	11	—N/a		Did not advance	
Yuta Sato; Ippei Watanabe; Amada Yudai; Koki Tsunefuka	4 × 100 m freestyle relay	3:32.18	10	—N/a		Did not advance	
Koki Tsunefuka; Yuta Sato; Amada Yudai; Ippei Watanabe	4 × 100 m medley relay	3:53.58	6 Q	—N/a		3:52.60	7

Girls

Athlete	Event	Heat		Semifinal		Final	
Athlete	Event	Time	Rank	Time	Rank	Time	Rank
Rina Yoshimura	200 m freestyle	2:10.35	34	—N/a		Did not advance	
Rina Yoshimura	200 m butterfly	2:15.44	12	—N/a		Did not advance	
Miono Takeuchi	50 m backstroke	30.14	24	Did not advance			
Miono Takeuchi	100 m backstroke	1:05.11	24	Did not advance			
Miono Takeuchi	200 m backstroke	2:20.18	22	—N/a		Did not advance	
Jurina Shiga	50 m butterfly	28.47	21	Did not advance			
Jurina Shiga	100 m butterfly	1:01.19	10 Q	1:01.30	11	Did not advance	
Jurina Shiga	200 m butterfly	2:12.50	6 Q	—N/a		2:13.54	6
Suzuna Onodera	200 m individual medley	2:19.77	13	—N/a		Did not advance	
Jurina Shiga; Rina Yoshimura; Suzuna Onodera; Miono Takeuchi	4 × 100 m freestyle relay	3:56.73	9	—N/a		Did not advance	
Miono Takeuchi; Suzuna Onodera; Jurina Shiga; Rina Yoshimura	4 × 100 m medley relay	4:17.11	8 Q	—N/a		4:16.71	8

Mixed

Athlete	Event	Heat		Final	
Athlete	Event	Time	Rank	Time	Rank
Ippei Watanabe; Koki Tsunefuka; Jurina Shiga; Rina Yoshimura	4 × 100 m freestyle relay	3:42.74	15	Did not advance	
Koki Tsunefuka; Ippei Watanabe; Jurina Shiga; Rina Yoshimura	4 × 100 m medley relay	4:00.73	9	Did not advance	

== Table Tennis ==
Japan qualified a girl based on its performance at the 2014 World Qualification Event and a boy based on the Under-18 World Rankings.

Singles

Athlete	Event	Group Stage	Rank	Round of 16	Quarterfinals	Semifinals	Final / BM	Rank
Athlete	Event	Opposition Score	Rank	Opposition Score	Opposition Score	Opposition Score	Opposition Score	Rank
Yuto Muramatsu	Boys	Group B Allegro (BEL); W 3–0	1 Q	Afanador (PUR); W 4–0		Calderano (BRA); W 4–1	Fan (CHN); L 2–4	2nd place, silver medalist(s)
Yuto Muramatsu	Boys	Ort (GER); W 3–0	1 Q	Afanador (PUR); W 4–0		Calderano (BRA); W 4–1	Fan (CHN); L 2–4	2nd place, silver medalist(s)
Yuto Muramatsu	Boys	Johnson (SKN); W 3–0	1 Q	Afanador (PUR); W 4–0		Calderano (BRA); W 4–1	Fan (CHN); L 2–4	2nd place, silver medalist(s)
Miyu Kato	Girls	Imre (HUN); W 3–0	1 Q	Lorenzotti (URU); W 4–1	Rakovac (CRO); W 4–1	Liu (CHN); L 1–4	Zhang (USA); L 2–4	4
Miyu Kato	Girls	Ort (BEL); W 3–1	1 Q	Lorenzotti (URU); W 4–1	Rakovac (CRO); W 4–1	Liu (CHN); L 1–4	Zhang (USA); L 2–4	4
Miyu Kato	Girls	Dong (NZL); W 3–0	1 Q	Lorenzotti (URU); W 4–1	Rakovac (CRO); W 4–1	Liu (CHN); L 1–4	Zhang (USA); L 2–4	4

Team

Athletes	Event	Group Stage	Rank	Round of 16	Quarterfinals	Semifinals	Final / BM	Rank
Athletes	Event	Opposition Score	Rank	Opposition Score	Opposition Score	Opposition Score	Opposition Score	Rank
Japan; Miyu Kato (JPN); Yuto Muramatsu (JPN)	Mixed	India; Mukherjee (IND); Yadav (IND); W 3–0	1 Q		Europe 2 Trosman (ISR); Ranefur (SWE); W 2–0	Hong Kong; Doo (HKG); Hung (HKG); W	China; Liu (CHN); Fan (CHN); L 0–2	2nd place, silver medalist(s)
Japan; Miyu Kato (JPN); Yuto Muramatsu (JPN)	Mixed	Intercontinental 1 Luo (CAN); Afanador (PUR); W	1 Q		Europe 2 Trosman (ISR); Ranefur (SWE); W 2–0	Hong Kong; Doo (HKG); Hung (HKG); W	China; Liu (CHN); Fan (CHN); L 0–2	2nd place, silver medalist(s)
Japan; Miyu Kato (JPN); Yuto Muramatsu (JPN)	Mixed	Africa 3 Salah (DJI); Alassani (TOG); W 3–0	1 Q		Europe 2 Trosman (ISR); Ranefur (SWE); W 2–0	Hong Kong; Doo (HKG); Hung (HKG); W	China; Liu (CHN); Fan (CHN); L 0–2	2nd place, silver medalist(s)

Qualification Legend: Q=Main Bracket (medal); qB=Consolation Bracket (non-medal)

== Tennis ==
Japan qualified two athletes based on the 9 June 2014 ITF World Junior Rankings.

Singles

Athlete	Event	Round of 32	Round of 16	Quarterfinals	Semifinals	Final / BM	Rank
Athlete	Event	Opposition Score	Opposition Score	Opposition Score	Opposition Score	Opposition Score	Rank
Ryotaro Matsumura	Boys' Singles	Zormann (BRA); W 2–0; 6–3, 6–4	Bahamonde (ARG); L 0–2; 4–6, 1–6	did not advance			9
Jumpei Yamasaki	Boys' Singles	Rogan (MNE); W 2–0; 6–1, 6–3	Zieliński (POL); W 2–1; 5–7, 6–1, 6–2	Khachanov (RUS); W 2–1; 6–3, 6^{6}-7^{8}, 6–1	Luz (BRA); L 1–2; 2–6, 6–4, 2–6	Rublev (RUS); L 0–2; 1–6, 3–6	4

Doubles

Athletes	Event	Round of 32	Round of 16	Quarterfinals	Semifinals	Final / BM	Rank
Athletes	Event	Opposition Score	Opposition Score	Opposition Score	Opposition Score	Opposition Score	Rank
Ryotaro Matsumura (JPN); Jumpei Yamasaki (JPN)	Boys' Doubles	—N/a	Chrysochos (CYP); Serdarušić (CRO); W 2–0; 6–3, 6–4	Bahamonde (ARG); Zukas (ARG); W w/o	Luz (BRA); Zormann (BRA); L 0–2; 1–6, 2–6	Luz (POL); Zormann (POL); W 2–1; 6–4, 0–6, [10]–[4]	3rd place, bronze medalist(s)
Ye Qiuyu (CHN); Jumpei Yamasaki (JPN)	Mixed Doubles	Xu (CHN); Matsumura (JPN); W 2–0; 6–1, 6–1	Kasatkina (RUS); Rublev (RUS); W 2–1; 7–5, 4–6, [10]–[3]	Stefani (BRA); Luz (BRA); W 2–1; 6–1, 3–6, [10]-[6]	Stollár (HUN); Majchrzak (POL); W 2–0; 7^{7}–6^{5}, 6–4	Teichmann (SUI); Zieliński (POL); L 1–2; 6–4, 3–6, [4]–[10]	2nd place, silver medalist(s)
Xu Shilin (CHN); Ryotaro Matsumura (JPN)	Mixed Doubles	Ye (CHN); Yamasaki (JPN); L 0–2; 1–6, 1–6	did not advance				17

== Triathlon ==
Japan qualified two athletes based on its performance at the 2014 Asian Youth Olympic Games Qualifier.

Individual

Athlete	Event	Swim (750m)	Trans 1	Bike (20 km)	Trans 2	Run (5 km)	Total Time	Rank
Koyo Yamasaki	Boys	09:36	00:43	31:58	00:21	17:47	1:00:25	25
Minami Kubono	Girls	10:05	00:47	31:43	00:25	18:24	1:01:24	5

Relay

Athlete	Event	Total Times per Athlete (Swim 250m, Bike 6.6 km, Run 1.8 km)	Total Group Time	Rank
Asia 2 Feng Jingshuang (CHN); Chong Sheng Cher (SIN); Chia Su Yin Denise (SIN); Koyo Yamasaki (JPN)	Mixed Relay	0:23:09; 0:22:16; 0:24:25; 0:21:00	01:30:50	13
Asia 1 Minami Kubono (JPN); Lam Michael (HKG); Kim Gyuri (KOR); Lee Gyuhyung (KOR)	Mixed Relay	0:21:43; 0:20:06; 0:23:10; 0:21:41	1:26:40	8

== Wrestling ==
Japan qualified two athletes based on its performance at the 2014 Asian Cadet Championships.

Key:

- VT – Victory by Fall.
- PP – Decision by Points – the loser with technical points.
- PO – Decision by Points – the loser without technical points.

Boys

Athlete	Event	Group stage				Final / RM	Rank
Athlete	Event	Opposition Score	Opposition Score	Opposition Score	Rank	Opposition Score	Rank
Yajyuro Yamasaki	Freestyle −76kg	Sargis Hovsepyan (ARM); W	Arshdeep Gurm (CAN); W	Iafeta Vou (ASA); W 4–0	1 Q	Meki Simonia (GEO); W 4–0 ^{ST}	1st place, gold medalist(s)

Girls

Athlete	Event	Group stage				Final	Rank
Athlete	Event	Opposition Score	Opposition Score	Opposition Score	Rank	Opposition Score	Rank
Mayu Mukaida	Freestyle −52kg	Ismail Habiba (EGY); W 4–0	Djullibaeva Shakhodat (UZB); W 4–0	Srey Mao Dorn (CAM); W 4–0	1	Leyla Gurbanova (AZE); W 3–1 ^{PP}	1st place, gold medalist(s)
