= Table tennis at the 2014 Summer Youth Olympics =

Table tennis at the II Summer Youth Olympic Games
- Venue: Wutaishan Sports Center
- Dates: 17–23 August
- No. of events: 3 (1 boys, 1 girls, 1 mixed)

Table tennis at the 2014 Summer Youth Olympics was held from 17 to 23 August at the Wutaishan Sports Center in Nanjing, China.

== Qualification ==
Each National Olympic Committee (NOC) can enter a maximum of 2 competitors, 1 per each gender. As hosts, China is given the maximum quota should they not qualify an athlete and a further 8 spots, 4 in each gender, will be allocated by the Tripartite Commission, however one spot was unused and was reallocated. The remaining 54 places shall be decided in four qualification phases: the 2014 World Qualification Event, the Under-18 World Rankings, six Road to Nanjing series events and six continental qualification tournaments.

To be eligible to participate at the Youth Olympics athletes must have been born between 1 January 1996 and 31 December 1999.

=== Boys ===
Event	Location	Date	Total Places	Qualified
Host Nation	-	-	1	Zhendong Fan (CHN)
2014 World Qualification Event	(Portugal) Vila Nova de Gaia	22–23 January 2014	4	David Reitspies (CZE); Kilian Ort (GER); Adam Szudi (HUN); Heng-Wei Yang (TPE)
ITTF Under-18 World Rankings	-	1 February 2014	3	Yuto Muramatsu (JPN); Hugo Calderano (BRA); Minhyeok Kim (KOR)
European Qualification Event	(Czech Republic) Hodonín	9–11 February 2014	4	Can Akkuzu (FRA); Patryk Zatowka (POL); Diogo Chen (POR); Tomislav Pucar (CRO)
Road to Nanjing series 1	(France) Metz	3–4 March 2014	1	Padasak Tanviriyavechakul (THA)
Road to Nanjing series 2	(India) Goa	23–24 March 2014	1	Kirill Gerassimenko (KAZ)
Latin American Qualification Event	(Dominican Republic) Santo Domingo	29–30 March 2014	2	Fermin Tenti (ARG); Brian Afanador (PUR)
Asian Qualification Event	(Thailand) Bangkok	5–7 April 2014	4	Ka Tak Hung (HKG); Abhishek Yadav (IND); Abdulrahman Al-Naggar (QAT); Jing Yuan Yin (SIN)
Road to Nanjing series 3	(Canada) Mississauga	7–8 April 2014	1	Andreas Levenko (AUT)
North American Qualification Event	(Canada) Mississauga	9 April 2014	1	Krishnateja Avvari (USA)
African Qualification Event	(Egypt) Cairo	12–13 April 2014	2	Aly Ghallab (EGY); Kerem Ben Yahia (TUN)
Road to Nanjing series 4	(Egypt) Cairo	14–15 April 2014	1	Elia Schmid (SUI)
Road to Nanjing series 5	(Argentina) Buenos Aires	21–22 April 2014	1	Martin Allegro (BEL)
Oceania Qualification Event	(Cook Islands) Avarua	22 May 2014	1	Dominic Huang (AUS)
Road to Nanjing series 6	(Cook Islands) Avarua	30–31 May 2014	1	Elias Ranefur (SWE)
Tripartite Invitation	-	-	4	Alejandro Toranzos (PAR); Christ Bienatiki (CGO); T'Anje Johnson (SKN); Soudes Alassani (TOG)
TOTAL			32	

=== Girls ===
Event	Location	Date	Total Places	Qualified
Host Nation	-	-	1	Gaoyang Liu (CHN)
2014 World Qualification Event	(Portugal) Vila Nova de Gaia	22–23 January 2014	4	Doo Hoi Kem (HKG); Miyu Kato (JPN); Adina Diaconu (ROU); Ssu-Hua Chiu (TPE)
ITTF Under-18 World Rankings	-	1 February 2014	3	Chantal Mantz (GER); Lily Zhang (USA); Tamolwan Khetkhuan (THA)
European Qualification Event	(Czech Republic) Hodonín	9-11 February 2014	4	Natalia Bajor (POL); Leila Imre (HUN); Nicole Trosman (ISR); Audrey Zarif (FRA)
Road to Nanjing series 1	(France) Metz	3-4 March 2014	1	Karoline Mischek (AUT)
Road to Nanjing series 2	(India) Goa	23-24 March 2014	1	Park Seri (KOR)
Latin American Qualification Event	(Dominican Republic) Santo Domingo	29-30 March 2014	2	Maria Lorenzotti (URU); Gremlis Arvelo (VEN)
Asian Qualification Event	(Thailand) Bangkok	5-7 April 2014	4	Sutirtha Mukherjee (IND); Yuliya Ryabova (KAZ); Herng Hwee Yee (SIN); Regina Kim (UZB)
Road to Nanjing series 3	(Canada) Mississauga	7-8 April 2014	1	Lisa Lung (BEL)
North American Qualification Event	(Canada) Mississauga	9 April 2014	1	Anqi Luo (CAN)
African Qualification Event	(Egypt) Cairo	12-13 April 2014	2	Sannah Lagsir (ALG); Alaa Saad (EGY)
Road to Nanjing series 4	(Egypt) Cairo	14-15 April 2014	1	Giorgia Piccolin (ITA)
Road to Nanjing series 5	(Argentina) Buenos Aires	21-22 April 2014	1	Lea Rakovac (CRO)
Oceania Qualification Event	(Cook Islands) Avarua	22 May 2014	1	Vy Bui (AUS)
Road to Nanjing series 6	(Cook Islands) Avarua	30-31 May 2014	1	Sophia Dong (NZL)
Tripartite Invitation	-	-	3	Chelsea Edghill (GUY); Fatouma Ali Salah (DJI); Florence Seera (UGA)
Reallocation	-	-	1	Kristyna Stefcova (CZE)
TOTAL			32	

== Schedule ==
The schedule was released by the Nanjing Youth Olympic Games Organizing Committee.

All times are CST (UTC+8)

Event date	Event day	Starting time	Event details
August 17	Sunday	10:00	Boys' Singles Group Stage; Girls' Singles Group Stage
August 17	Sunday	16:00	Boys' Singles Group Stage; Girls' Singles Group Stage
August 18	Monday	10:00	Boys' Singles Group Stage; Girls' Singles Group Stage
August 18	Monday	16:00	Boys' Singles 1/8 Finals; Girls' Singles 1/8 Finals
August 19	Tuesday	10:00	Boys' Singles Quarterfinals; Girls' Singles Quarterfinals
August 19	Tuesday	15:00	Boys' Singles Semifinals; Girls' Singles Semifinals
August 20	Wednesday	10:00	Boys' Singles Medal Matches; Girls' Singles Medal Matches
August 20	Wednesday	15:30	Mixed Team Group Stage
August 21	Thursday	10:00	Mixed Team Group Stage
August 21	Thursday	16:15	Mixed Team Group Stage
August 22	Friday	10:00	Mixed Team 1/8 Finals
August 22	Friday	17:00	Mixed Team Quarterfinals
August 23	Saturday	10:00	Mixed Team Semifinals
August 23	Saturday	17:00	Mixed Team Medal Matches

== Medal summary ==
=== Medal table ===
* Host nation (China)

Rank	Nation	Gold	Silver	Bronze	Total
1	China*	3	0	0	3
2	Japan	0	2	0	2
3	Hong Kong	0	1	1	2
4	Brazil	0	0	1	1
4	United States	0	0	1	1
Totals (5 entries)		3	3	3	9

=== Events ===
Event	Gold	Silver	Bronze
Boys' singles	Fan Zhendong; China	Yuto Muramatsu; Japan	Hugo Calderano; Brazil
Girls' singles	Liu Gaoyang; China	Doo Hoi Kem; Hong Kong	Lily Zhang; United States
Mixed team	China; Liu Gaoyang; Fan Zhendong	Japan; Miyu Kato; Yuto Muramatsu	Hong Kong; Doo Hoi Kem; Hung Ka Tak
