= Triathlon at the 2014 Summer Youth Olympics – Girls' =

Girls' at the II Summer Youth Olympic Games
- Venue: Xuanwu Lake
- Dates: 17 August 2014
- Competitors: 32 from 32 nations

Medalists
1st place, gold medalist(s)		Brittany Dutton	Australia
2nd place, silver medalist(s)		Stephanie Jenks	United States
3rd place, bronze medalist(s)		Émilie Morier	France

Girls' triathlon was part of the triathlon at the 2014 Summer Youth Olympics programme. The event consisted of 750 metres (0.47 mi) swimming, 20 kilometres (12 mi) cycling, and 5 kilometres (3.1 mi) running. It was held on 17 August 2014 at Xuanwu Lake.

== Results ==
The race began at approximately 9:00 a.m. (UTC+8) on 17 August at Xuanwu Lake.

Rank	Start No.	Triathlete	Swimming	Transit 1	Cycling	Transit 2	Running	Total time	Difference
1st place, gold medalist(s)	2	Brittany Dutton (AUS)	10:21	00:44	31:00	00:26	17:25	0:00:59	±00:00
2nd place, silver medalist(s)	4	Stephanie Jenks (USA)	10:26	00:49	31:20	00:27	17:31	1:00:33	+00:37
3rd place, bronze medalist(s)	19	Émilie Morier (FRA)	10:29	00:46	31:22	00:27	17:51	1:00:44	+00:59
4	23	Kristin Ranwig (GER)	10:09	00:46	31:40	00:23	18:20	1:01:18	+01:22
5	17	Minami Kubono (JPN)	10:05	00:47	31:43	00:25	18:24	1:01:24	+01:28
6	14	Kirsten Nuyes (NED)	10:30	00:47	31:18	00:28	18:27	1:01:30	+01:34
7	27	Elizaveta Zhizhina (RUS)	10:29	00:43	31:24	00:24	18:39	1:01:39	+01:43
8	26	Sian Rainsley (GBR)	10:08	00:46	31:43	00:26	18:50	1:01:53	+01:57
9	5	Carmen Gomez Cortes (ESP)	10:20	00:46	31:32	00:27	19:02	1:02:07	+02:11
10	12	Alberte Kjær Pedersen (DEN)	10:46	00:41	32:46	00:24	17:39	1:02:16	+02:20
11	31	Amber Rombaut (BEL)	10:35	00:45	31:15	00:27	19:44	1:02:46	+02:50
12	30	Sara Skardelly (AUT)	11:10	00:45	32:43	00:30	17:53	1:03:01	+03:05
13	10	Elizabeth Stannard (NZL)	10:33	00:46	31:16	00:35	20:11	1:03:21	+03:25
14	33	Katherine Vanesa Clemant Materano (VEN)	10:07	00:50	31:40	00:29	20:48	1:03:54	+03:58
15	20	Kim Gyuri (KOR)	10:49	00:55	32:54	00:24	19:00	1:04:02	+04:06
16	7	Flóra Bicsák (HUN)	11:24	00:44	34:01	00:25	17:53	1:04:27	+04:31
17	15	Emily Wagner (CAN)	10:06	00:48	33:20	00:25	19:58	1:04:37	+04:41
18	1	Jayme-Sue Vermaas (RSA)	10:31	00:45	33:24	00:25	19:34	1:04:39	+04:43
19	18	Catalina Salazar (CHI)	10:40	00:48	33:12	00:25	19:39	1:04:44	+04:48
20	29	Barbara Santos (BRA)	10:53	00:55	32:51	00:30	20:10	1:05:19	+05:23
21	21	Giovanna Michelle Gonzalez Miranda (ESA)	10:54	00:52	32:54	00:27	20:23	1:05:30	+05:34
22	3	Sofiya Pryyma (UKR)	11:18	00:52	33:07	00:29	19:47	1:05:33	+05:37
23	8	Feng Jingshuang (CHN)	10:33	00:49	33:17	00:31	20:23	1:05:33	+05:37
24	11	Chia Su Yin Denise (SIN)	10:58	00:49	32:51	00:29	20:59	1:06:06	+06:10
25	9	Carolina Velásquez (COL)	11:25	00:48	33:58	00:27	19:37	1:06:15	+06:19
26	16	Ana Catalina Barahona (CRC)	10:23	00:53	33:23	00:24	21:24	1:06:27	+06:31
27	25	Rehab Hamdy (EGY)	10:29	1:02	33:12	00:28	21:45	1:06:56	+07:00
28	6	Jessica Romero Tinoco (MEX)	10:07	00:53	34:11	00:29	21:27	1:07:07	+07:11
29	24	Erica Hawley (BER)	10:43	00:54	34:35	00:25	21:37	1:08:14	+08:18
30	22	Hung Cheuk Yi Chelsea (HKG)	10:41	00:51	34:37	00:30	21:53	1:08:32	+08:36
31	32	Serena Rendell (ZIM)	11:33	00:50	33:46	00:27	23:34	1:10:10	+10:14
32	28	Victorija Deldio (PHI)	13:08	00:54	37:11	00:28	22:26	1:14:07	+14:11

Note: No one is allotted the number 13.
Note: Rehab Hamdy (EGY) and Victorija Deldio (PHI) received a 10 seconds penalty, served during run.
