= 2014 in table tennis =

This page lists the table tennis events for 2014.

- January 9 – December 14: 2014 ITTF Calendar of Events
- April 28 – May 5: 2014 World Team Table Tennis Championships in (Japan) Tokyo
  - China claimed both men's and women's team titles.
- August 17–23: 2014 Summer Youth Olympics
  - Boys' singles (gold) (China) FAN Zhendong; (silver) (Japan) Yuto Muramatsu; (bronze) (Brazil) Hugo Calderano
  - Girls' singles (gold) (China) LIU Gaoyang; (silver) (Hong Kong) DOO Hoi Kem; (bronze) (United States) Lily Zhang
  - Mixed international team: (gold) (China) FAN Zhendong / LIU Gaoyang; (silver) (Japan) Miyu Kato / Yuto Muramatsu; (bronze) (Hong Kong) DOO Hoi Kem / HUNG Ka Tak
- October 17–19: Women's World Cup in (Austria) Linz
  - Winner: (China) Ding Ning; Second: (China) Li Xiaoxia; Third: (Japan) Kasumi Ishikawa
- October 24–26: Men's World Cup in (Germany) Düsseldorf
  - Winner: (China) Zhang Jike; Second: (China) Ma Long; Third: (Germany) Timo Boll
- November 30 – December 7: 2014 World Junior Table Tennis Championships at Shanghai
  - Host nation, China, swept all the gold medals for this event. China won the overall medal tally as well.
