= United States at the 2014 Summer Youth Olympics =

- Flag of the United States
- IOC code: USA
- NOC: United States Olympic Committee
- Website: www.teamusa.org

in Nanjing
- Competitors: 92 in 19 sports
- Medals Ranked 3rd: Gold 10 Silver 5 Bronze 7 Total 22

Summer Youth Olympics appearances (overview)
- 2010; 2014; 2018; 2026

The United States competed at the 2014 Summer Youth Olympics, in Nanjing, China from 16 August to 28 August 2014. 92 athletes across 19 sports participated.

== Medalists ==
Medal	Name	Sport	Event	Date
Gold	Sabrina Massialas	Fencing	Girls' foil	17 August
Gold	Clara Smiddy	Swimming	Girls' 100 metre backstroke	18 August
Gold	Hannah Moore	Swimming	Girls' 200 metre backstroke	19 August
Gold	Kendall Yount	Taekwondo	Girls' +63 kg	21 August
Gold	Hannah Moore	Swimming	Girls' 400 metre freestyle	22 August
Gold	Noah Lyles	Athletics	Boys' 200 metres	24 August
Gold	Myles Marshall	Athletics	Boys' 800 metre	25 August
Gold	Arike Ogunbowale; Napheesa Collier; Katie Samuelson; De'Janae Boykin	Basketball	Girls' tournament	26 August
Gold	Jajaira Gonzalez	Boxing	Girls' 60 kg	26 August
Gold	Shakur Stevenson	Boxing	Boys' 52 kg	27 August
Silver	Stephanie Jenks	Triathlon	Girls'	17 August
Silver	Mason Manville	Wrestling	Boys' Greco-Roman 69 kg	25 August
Silver	Daramni Rock	Boxing	Boys' +91 kg	27 August
Silver	Cade Olivas	Wrestling	Boys' freestyle 46 kg	27 August
Silver	Daton Fix	Wrestling	Boys' freestyle 54 kg	27 August
Bronze	Meghan Small	Swimming	Girls' 200 metre individual medley	17 August
Bronze	Alec Yoder	Gymnastics	Boys' artistic individual all-around	19 August
Bronze	Lily Zhang	Table tennis	Girls' singles	20 August
Bronze	Katie Samuelson	Basketball	Girls' shoot-out contest	21 August
Bronze	Rhesa Foster	Athletics	Girls' Long Jump	23 August
Bronze	Brandee Johnson	Athletics	Girls' 200 metres	24 August
Bronze	Laura Zeng	Gymnastics	Girls' rhythmic individual all-around	27 August

== Athletics ==
United States qualified 16 athletes.

Qualification Legend: Q=Final A (medal); qB=Final B (non-medal); qC=Final C (non-medal); qD=Final D (non-medal); qE=Final E (non-medal)

Boys
Track & road events

Athlete	Event	Heats		Final	
Athlete	Event	Result	Rank	Result	Rank
Jeffrey Uzzell	100 m	11.27	19 qC	11.04	18
Noah Lyles	200 m	20.71 PB	1 Q	20.80	1st place, gold medalist(s)
Andrew James	400 m	49.06	13 qB	DNS	
Myles Marshall	800 m	1:50.22	1 Q	1:49.14	1st place, gold medalist(s)
Amere Lattin	110 m hurdles	13.53 PB	3 Q	15.53	7

Field Events

Athlete	Event	Qualification		Final	
Athlete	Event	Distance	Rank	Distance	Rank
Tyler Merkley	Discus throw	56.61	5 Q	56.27	7
Kenneth Brinson	Hammer throw	63.20	14 qB	59.51	14

Girls
Track & road events

Athlete	Event	Heats		Final	
Athlete	Event	Result	Rank	Result	Rank
Janie O'Connor	100 m	12.56	16 qB	DNS	
Brandee Johnson	200 m	24.41	2 Q	24.28	3rd place, bronze medalist(s)
Brittny Ellis	400 m	54.11	2 Q	53.82	6
Kimani Rushing	100 m hurdles	13.73	3 Q	14.05	8

Field events

Athlete	Event	Qualification		Final	
Athlete	Event	Distance	Rank	Distance	Rank
Rhesa Foster	Long jump	5.76	6 Q	6.17	3rd place, bronze medalist(s)
Chinne Okoronkwo	Triple jump	12.03	13 qB	12.21	9
Janae Moffitt	High jump	1.65	14 qB	1.73	10
Haley Showalter	Discus throw	43.39	8 Q	45.12	7
Emma Fitzgerald	Javelin throw	46.64	12 qB	43.43	14

== Basketball ==
United States qualified a girls' team from their performance at the 2013 U18 3x3 World Championships.

Skills Competition

Athlete	Event	Qualification			Final		
Athlete	Event	Points	Time	Rank	Points	Time	Rank
Katie Samuelson	Girls' Shoot-out Contest	6	23.6	4 Q	4	32.0	3rd place, bronze medalist(s)
De'Janae Boykin	Girls' Shoot-out Contest	4	21.3	19	Did not advance		
Arike Ogunbowale	Girls' Shoot-out Contest	3	21.4	30	Did not advance		
Napheesa Collier	Girls' Shoot-out Contest	3	25.7	38	Did not advance		

=== Girls' tournament ===
Roster

- De'Janae Boykin
- Napheesa Collier
- Arike Ogunbowale
- Katie Samuelson

Group stage

Pos	Team	Pld	W	D	L	PF	PA	PD	Pts	Qualification
1	United States	9	9	0	0	190	54	+136	27	Round of 16
2	Belgium	9	7	0	2	136	75	+61	21	Round of 16
3	Thailand	9	6	0	3	96	102	−6	18	Round of 16
4	Czech Republic	9	6	0	3	140	106	+34	18	Round of 16
5	Chinese Taipei	9	5	0	4	124	114	+10	15	Round of 16
6	Romania	9	5	0	4	118	102	+16	15	Round of 16
7	Egypt	9	4	0	5	125	127	−2	12	Round of 16
8	Guam	9	2	0	7	77	151	−74	6	Round of 16
9	Andorra	9	1	0	8	76	161	−85	3	Eliminated
10	Indonesia	9	0	0	9	66	156	−90	0	Eliminated

18 August 2014
20:00

United States	21–3	Romania

Wutaishan Sports Center, Nanjing

19 August 2014
17:20

Indonesia	2–21	United States

Wutaishan Sports Center, Nanjing

19 August 2014
20:20

United States	21–6	Egypt

Wutaishan Sports Center, Nanjing

20 August 2014
18:40

Thailand	5–21	United States

Wutaishan Sports Center, Nanjing

22 August 2014
17:40

United States	21–6	Belgium

Wutaishan Sports Center, Nanjing

22 August 2014
21:20

Andorra	5–22	United States

Wutaishan Sports Center, Nanjing

23 August 2014
19:00

United States	21–5	Chinese Taipei

Wutaishan Sports Center, Nanjing

24 August 2014
18:20

Czech Republic	12–21	United States

Wutaishan Sports Center, Nanjing

24 August 2014
21:00

United States	21–10	Guam

Wutaishan Sports Center, Nanjing

Knockout Stage

Round of 16	Quarterfinals	Semifinals	Final	Rank
Opposition Score	Opposition Score	Opposition Score	Opposition Score	Rank
Venezuela; W 21-7	Estonia; W 21–12	Hungary; W 21–14	Netherlands; W 19–10	1st place, gold medalist(s)

== Beach volleyball ==
United States qualified a girls' team by winning the NORCECA Central Zone Qualifier and qualified a boys' team by their performance at the NORCECA Final YOG Qualifier.

Athletes	Event	Preliminary round	Standing	Round of 24	Round of 16	Quarterfinals	Semifinals	Final / BM	Rank
Athletes	Event	Opposition Score	Standing	Opposition Score	Opposition Score	Opposition Score	Opposition Score	Opposition Score	Rank
T.J. DeFalco; Louis Richard	Boys'	Venezuela; L 0–2	5	Did not advance					
T.J. DeFalco; Louis Richard	Boys'	Indonesia; L 0–2	5	Did not advance					
T.J. DeFalco; Louis Richard	Boys'	Austria; L 0–2	5	Did not advance					
T.J. DeFalco; Louis Richard	Boys'	Poland; L 0–2	5	Did not advance					
T.J. DeFalco; Louis Richard	Boys'	Rwanda; W 2–0	5	Did not advance					
Skylar Caputo; Zana Muno	Girls'	Brazil; L 0–2	4	France; W 2–0	Latvia; W 2–1	Canada; L 1–2	Did not advance		5
Skylar Caputo; Zana Muno	Girls'	Switzerland; L 1–2	4	France; W 2–0	Latvia; W 2–1	Canada; L 1–2	Did not advance		5
Skylar Caputo; Zana Muno	Girls'	Czech Republic; L 1–2	4	France; W 2–0	Latvia; W 2–1	Canada; L 1–2	Did not advance		5
Skylar Caputo; Zana Muno	Girls'	Vietnam; W 2–0	4	France; W 2–0	Latvia; W 2–1	Canada; L 1–2	Did not advance		5
Skylar Caputo; Zana Muno	Girls'	Sierra Leone; W 2–0	4	France; W 2–0	Latvia; W 2–1	Canada; L 1–2	Did not advance		5

== Boxing ==
United States qualified four boxers based on its performance at the 2014 AIBA Youth World Championships.

Boys

Athlete	Event	Preliminaries	Semifinals	Final / RM	Rank
Athlete	Event	Opposition Result	Opposition Result	Opposition Result	Rank
Shakur Stevenson	-52 kg	Asenov (BUL); W 3–0	Ali (GBR); W 3–0	Lyu (CHN); W 3–0	1st place, gold medalist(s)
Daramni Rock	+91 kg	Espindola (ARG); W WO	Kerimkhano (RUS); W 2–1	Kadiru (GER); L 0–3	2nd place, silver medalist(s)

Girls

Athlete	Event	Preliminaries	Semifinals	Final / RM	Rank
Athlete	Event	Opposition Result	Opposition Result	Opposition Result	Rank
Jajaira Gonzalez	-60 kg	Bye	Alexiusson (SWE); W 2–0	Ginty (IRL); W 3–0	1st place, gold medalist(s)
Martha Fabela	-75 kg	Parker (AUS); L 0–3	Did not advance	Bout for 5th place Michel (FRA); L 0–3	6

== Canoeing ==
United States qualified one boat based on its performance at the 2013 World Junior Canoe Sprint and Slalom Championships.

Boys

Athlete	Event	Qualification		Repechage		Round of 16		Quarterfinals	Semifinals	Final / BM	Rank
Athlete	Event	Time	Rank	Time	Rank	Time	Rank	Opposition Result	Opposition Result	Opposition Result	Rank
Jordan Sherman	K1 slalom	1:14.750	6 Q	—N/a	—N/a	1:14.750	6 Q	Urankar (SLO); L 1:20.352–1:09.675	Did not advance		
Jordan Sherman	K1 sprint	2:34.991	19	DNF	11	Did not advance					

== Diving ==
United States qualified four quotas based on its performance at the Nanjing 2014 Diving Qualifying Event.

Athlete	Event	Preliminary		Final	
Athlete	Event	Points	Rank	Points	Rank
Dashiell Enos	Boys' 3 m springboard	501.15	8 Q	535.75	6
Gracia Mahoney	Girls' 3 m springboard	401.50	5 Q	429.45	4
Gracia Mahoney	Girls' 10 m platform	373.25	7 Q	375.25	8
Gracia Mahoney (USA); Pylyp Tkachenko (UKR)	Mixed team	—N/a		354.00	3rd place, bronze medalist(s)

== Fencing ==
United States qualified six athletes based on its performance at the 2014 FIE Cadet World Championships.

=== Boys ===
Group stage

Athlete	Event	Match 1	Match 2	Match 3	Match 4	Match 5	Match 6	Seed
Justin Yoo	Épée	Elsayed (EGY); W 5–4	Kim (KOR); W 5–2	Ogilvie (NZL); W 5–4	Abate (ITA); W 5–0	French (CAN); W 5–4	—N/a	1
George Haglund	Foil	Marostega (BRA); W 5–4	Fitzgerald (AUS); L 2–5	Braun (GER); L 0–5	Roger (FRA); L 4–5	Files (CRO); W 5–3	—N/a	10
Karol Metryka	Sabre	di Martino (ARG); W 5–3	Shengelia (GEO); L 3–5	Ferjani (TUN); L 2–5	Asahrin (BRU); W 5–0	Kassymov (KAZ); L 3–5	Giakoumatos (GRE); L 3–5	9

Knockout Stage

Athlete	Event	Round of 16	Quarterfinals	Semifinals	Final / BM	Rank
Athlete	Event	Opposition Score	Opposition Score	Opposition Score	Opposition Score	Rank
Justin Yoo	Épée	Bye	Kim (KOR); W 15–12	Islas Flygare (SWE); L 9–15	Limarev (RUS); L 14–15	4
George Haglund	Foil	Huang (CHN); L 7–15	Did not advance			10
Karol Metryka	Sabre	Shengelia (GEO); L 13–15	Did not advance			10

=== Girls ===
Group stage

Athlete	Event	Match 1	Match 2	Match 3	Match 4	Match 5	Match 6	Seed
Catherine Nixon	Épée	Simms-Lymn (JAM); W 5–4	Yoshimura (JPN); W 5–1	de Marchi (ITA); W 5–4	Brovko (UKR); W 5–0	—N/a		1
Sabrina Massialas	Foil	Guillaume (FRA); W 5–2	Miyawaki (JPN); L 3–5	Huang (CHN); L 2–5	Cecchini (BRA); W 5–2	Pásztor (HUN); L 3–5	Clavijo (BOL); W 5–0	6

Knockout Stage

Athlete	Event	Round of 16	Quarterfinals	Semifinals	Final / BM	Rank
Athlete	Event	Opposition Score	Opposition Score	Opposition Score	Opposition Score	Rank
Catherine Nixon	Épée	Bye	Simms-Lymn (JAM); W 15–5	de Marchi (ITA); L 11–15	Linde (SWE); L 8–15	4
Sabrina Massialas	Foil	Elsharkawy (EGY); W 15–7	Pásztor (HUN); W 15–9	Huang (CHN); W 12–7	Karin Miyawaki (JPN); W 7–6	1st place, gold medalist(s)

=== Mixed Team ===
Athletes	Event	Round of 16	Quarterfinals	Semifinals / PM	Final / PM	Rank
Athletes	Event	Opposition Score	Opposition Score	Opposition Score	Opposition Score	Rank
Americas 1 Justin Yoo (USA); Sabrina Massialas (USA); Pietro Jose di Martino (ARG); Catherine Nixon (USA); George Haglund (USA); Julieta Isabel Toledo Ames (MEX)	Mixed Team	Bye	Europe 2 L 24–30	Europe 4 L 27–30	Europe 3 L 28–30	8
Americas 2 Dylan French (CAN); Gabriela Cecchini (BRA); Karol Metryka (USA); Tia Simms-Lymn (JAM); Pedro Marostega (BRA); Aydill-Marie Colon Quinones (PUR)	Mixed Team	Africa; W 30–20	Europe 1 L 29–30	Europe 3 W 30–29	Europe 4 W 30–28	5

== Gymnastics ==
=== Artistic Gymnastics ===
United States qualified one athlete based on its performance at the 2014 Junior Pan American Artistic Gymnastics Championships.

Boys

Athlete	Event	Qualification						Final	
Athlete	Event	Apparatus						Total	Rank
Athlete	Event	F	PH	R	V	PB	HB	Total	Rank
Alec Yoder	Qualification	13.250	13.800 Q	13.150	14.300	13.600 Q	12.450	80.550	6 Q
Alec Yoder	All-Around	13.650	14.100	13.100	14.250	13.850	13.850	82.800	3rd place, bronze medalist(s)
Alec Yoder	Pommel Horse	—N/a						12.900	7
Alec Yoder	Parallel Bars	—N/a						13.633	4

=== Rhythmic Gymnastics ===
United States qualified one athlete based on its performance at the 2014 Junior Pan American Rhythmic Championships.

Individual

Athlete	Event	Qualification						Final					
Athlete	Event	Hoop	Ball	Clubs	Ribbon	Total	Rank	Hoop	Ball	Clubs	Ribbon	Total	Rank
Laura Zeng	Individual	14.875	13.450	14.500	14.550	57.375	2 Q	14.450	14.050	14.400	13.850	56.750	3rd place, bronze medalist(s)

=== Trampoline ===
United States qualified two athletes based on its performance at the 2014 Junior Pan American Trampoline Championships.

Athlete	Event	Qualification				Final	
Athlete	Event	Routine 1	Routine 2	Total	Rank	Score	Rank
Colin Duda	Boys	40.800	50.610	91.410	8 Q	5.690	8
Nicole Ahsinger	Girls	41.785	47.220	89.005	7 Q	49.950	5

== Judo ==
United States qualified one athlete based on its performance at the 2013 Cadet World Judo Championships.

Individual

Athlete	Event	Round of 32	Round of 16	Quarterfinals	Semifinals	Rep 1	Rep 2	Rep 3	Rep 4	Final / BM	Rank
Athlete	Event	Opposition Result	Opposition Result	Opposition Result	Opposition Result	Opposition Result	Opposition Result	Opposition Result	Opposition Result	Opposition Result	Rank
Adonis Diaz	Boys' -66 kg	Bye	Sárecz (HUN); W 100–000	Ryu (KOR); L 000–100	Did not advance	Bye	Dermishyan (ARM); L 000–010	Did not advance			

Team

Athletes	Event	Round of 16	Quarterfinals	Semifinals	Final	Rank
Athletes	Event	Opposition Result	Opposition Result	Opposition Result	Opposition Result	Rank
Team Douillet; Gustavo Basile (ARG); Marko Bubanja (AUT); Adonis Diaz (USA); Liudmyla Drozdova (UKR); Lee Hye-kyeong (KOR); Brigita Matic (CRO); Peter Miles (GBR)	Mixed Team	Team Yamashita; W 3(200)–3(112)	Team Nevzorov; W 5–2	Team Geesink; L 3(111)–3(202)	Did not advance	3rd place, bronze medalist(s)

== Modern Pentathlon ==
United States qualified one athlete based on its performance at the 2014 Youth A World Championships.

Athlete	Event	Fencing Ranking Round (épée one touch)		Swimming (200 m freestyle)			Fencing Final round (épée one touch)		Combined: Shooting/Running (10 m air pistol)/(3000 m)			Total Points	Final Rank
Athlete	Event	Results	Rank	Time	Rank	Points	Rank	Points	Time	Rank	Points	Total Points	Final Rank
Brendan Anderson	Boys' Individual	10-13	12	2:06.75	11	320	13	245	12:36.04	10	544	1109	10
Brendan Anderson (USA); Aroa Freije Torneiro (ESP)	Mixed Relay	18-28	20	2:00.05	3	340	20	243	12:12.93	6	568	1151	11

== Rowing ==
United States qualified two boats based on its performance at the 2013 World Rowing Junior Championships.

Athlete	Event	Heats		Repechage		Final	
Athlete	Event	Time	Rank	Time	Rank	Time	Rank
Benjamin Cohen; Liam Corrigan	Boys' Pairs	3:17.16; 3:27.27	3; 6 R	3:15.61	3 FB	3:19.43	8
Marlee Blue; Dana Moffat	Girls' Pairs	3:38.17; 3:33.44	3; 3 R	3:32.94	2 FA	3:39.25	4

Qualification Legend: FA=Final A (medal); FB=Final B (non-medal); FC=Final C (non-medal); FD=Final D (non-medal); SA/B=Semifinals A/B; SC/D=Semifinals C/D; R=Repechage

== Rugby sevens ==
United States qualified a boys' and girls' team based on its performance at the 2013 Rugby World Cup Sevens.

=== Boys' tournament ===
Roster

- Cian Barry
- Hanco Germishuys
- Brian Hannon
- Junior Helu
- Vili Helu
- Sione Masoe
- Aaron Matthews
- Malcolm May
- Suwaiter Poch
- Tyler Sousley
- Austin Taefu

Group stage

Pos	Team	Pld	W	D	L	PF	PA	PD	Pts
1	Argentina	5	5	0	0	145	34	+111	15
2	France	5	4	0	1	98	55	+43	13
3	Fiji	5	2	0	3	82	70	+12	9
4	Kenya	5	2	0	3	68	107	−39	9
5	Japan	5	2	0	3	73	131	−58	9
6	United States	5	0	0	5	59	128	−69	5

17 August 2014
11:00

Kenya	22:12	United States

Youth Olympic Sports Park

17 August 2014
17:30

Fiji	29:10	United States

Youth Olympic Sports Park

18 August 2014
11:30

United States	10:22	Japan

Youth Olympic Sports Park

18 August 2014
18:00

France	22:17	United States

Youth Olympic Sports Park

19 August 2014
11:00

Argentina	33:10	United States

Youth Olympic Sports Park

Knockout Stage

5th place Game	Rank
Opposition Score	Rank
Japan; W 29:12	5

=== Girls' tournament ===
Roster

- Tess Feury
- Haley Langan
- Apaau Mailau
- Michel Navarro
- Dana Olsen
- Tiffany Person
- Emily Prentice
- Kat Ramage
- Becca Rosko
- Richelle Stephens
- Danielle Walko-Siua
- Whitney Wilson

Group stage

Pos	Team	Pld	W	D	L	PF	PA	PD	Pts
1	Australia	5	5	0	0	146	17	+129	15
2	China	5	4	0	1	144	32	+112	13
3	Canada	5	3	0	2	108	71	+37	11
4	United States	5	1	1	3	59	98	−39	8
5	Spain	5	1	1	3	44	129	−85	8
6	Tunisia	5	0	0	5	12	166	−154	5

17 August 2014
10:00

Spain	12:12	United States

Youth Olympic Sports Park

17 August 2014
16:30

Canada	19:14	United States

Youth Olympic Sports Park

18 August 2014
09:00

Australia	38:0	United States

Youth Olympic Sports Park

18 August 2014
16:30

United States	7:29	China

Youth Olympic Sports Park

19 August 2014
09:00

United States	26:0	Tunisia

Youth Olympic Sports Park

Knockout Stage

Semifinals	Final / BM	Rank
Opposition Score	Opposition Score	Rank
Australia; L 0:33	China; L 0:12	4

== Sailing ==
United States qualified a Byte CII boat based on its performance at the 2013 World Byte CII Championships. United States later qualified a Techno 293 boat based on its performance at the Techno 293 North American & Caribbean Continental Qualifiers.

Athlete	Event	Race											Net Points	Final Rank
Athlete	Event	1	2	3	4	5	6	7	8	9	10	M*	Net Points	Final Rank
Henry Marshall	Boys' Byte CII	9	12	3	11	10	10	6	—N/a	—N/a	—N/a	2	51	4
Maximo Nores	Boys' Techno 293	18	11	15	15	18	16	—N/a	—N/a	—N/a	—N/a	9	84	16

== Swimming ==
United States qualified eight swimmers.

Boys

Athlete	Event	Heat		Semifinal		Final	
Athlete	Event	Time	Rank	Time	Rank	Time	Rank
Patrick Conaton	100 m freestyle	52.49	28	Did not advance			
Patrick Conaton	100 m backstroke	56.59	12 Q	56.95	14	Did not advance	
Patrick Conaton	200 m backstroke	2.03.92	11	—N/a		Did not advance	
Patrick Mulcare	200 m freestyle	1:51.33	8 Q	—N/a		1:50.57	8
Patrick Mulcare	50 m backstroke	26.86	20	Did not advance			
Patrick Mulcare	100 m backstroke	56.28	8 Q	55.86	8 Q	58.08	8
Patrick Mulcare	200 m backstroke	2:01.79	5 Q	—N/a		1:59.65	4
Patrick Mulcare	200 m individual medley	2:02.66	2 Q	—N/a		2:02.88	4
Patrick Ransford	400 m freestyle	3:56.31	12	—N/a		Did not advance	
Patrick Ransford	800 m freestyle	—N/a				8:04.46	8
Justin Wright	100 m butterfly	55.47	14 Q	54.88	12	Did not advance	
Justin Wright	200 m butterfly	2:00.04	5 Q	—N/a		1:59.40	6
Patrick Conaton; Patrick Mulcare; Patrick Ransford; Justin Wright	4 × 100 m freestyle relay	3:29.80	3 Q	—N/a		3:28.75	7
Patrick Conaton; Patrick Mulcare; Patrick Ransford; Justin Wright	4 × 100 m medley relay	3:55.07	3 Q	—N/a		DNS	8

Girls

Athlete	Event	Heat		Semifinal		Final	
Athlete	Event	Time	Rank	Time	Rank	Time	Rank
Clara Smiddy	50 m freestyle	26.42	15 Q	26.39	16	Did not advance	
Clara Smiddy	100 m freestyle	57.38	18	Did not advance			
Clara Smiddy	50 m backstroke	29.15	5 Q	29.11	6 Q	28.91	T4
Clara Smiddy	100 m backstroke	1:01.73	1 Q	1:01.83	2 Q	1:01.22	1st place, gold medalist(s)
Meghan Small	200 m freestyle	2:02.50	13	—N/a		Did not advance	
Meghan Small	100 m butterfly	1:01.39	12 Q	1:02.13	14	Did not advance	
Meghan Small	200 m individual medley	2:15.24	1 Q	—N/a		2:14.01	3rd place, bronze medalist(s)
Hannah Moore	400 m freestyle	4:14.54	5 Q	—N/a		4:11.05	1st place, gold medalist(s)
Hannah Moore	200 m backstroke	2:11.02	1 Q	—N/a		2:10.42	1st place, gold medalist(s)
Hannah Moore	200 m individual medley	2:18.02	9	—N/a		Did not advance	
Courtney Mykkanen	50 m backstroke	30.99	34	Did not advance			
Courtney Mykkanen	100 m backstroke	1:05.80	27	Did not advance			
Courtney Mykkanen	200 m backstroke	2:19.27	20	—N/a		Did not advance	
Hannah Moore; Courtney Mykkanen; Meghan Small; Clara Smiddy	4 × 100 m freestyle relay	3:53.43	3 Q	—N/a		3:51.37	7
Hannah Moore; Courtney Mykkanen; Meghan Small; Clara Smiddy	4 × 100 m medley relay	4:17.20	6	—N/a		did not advance	

Mixed

Athlete	Event	Heat		Final	
Athlete	Event	Time	Rank	Time	Rank
Patrick Mulcare; Courtney Mykkanen; Clara Smiddy; Justin Wright	4 × 100 m freestyle relay	3:39.49	11	Did not advance	
Patrick Mulcare; Courtney Mykkanen; Clara Smiddy; Justin Wright	4 × 100 m medley relay	4:01.27	11	Did not advance	

== Table Tennis ==
United States qualified a female athlete based on the ITTF Under-18 World Rankings. Later United States qualified a male athlete based on its performance at the North American Qualification Event.

Singles

Athlete	Event	Group stage	Rank	Round of 16	Quarterfinals	Semifinals	Final / BM	Rank
Athlete	Event	Opposition Score	Rank	Opposition Score	Opposition Score	Opposition Score	Opposition Score	Rank
Krishnateja Avvari	Boys	Group G Gerassimenko (KAZ); L 0–3	4 qB	Ranefur (SWE); L 1–3	Did not advance			25
Krishnateja Avvari	Boys	Yadav (IND); L 0–3	4 qB	Ranefur (SWE); L 1–3	Did not advance			25
Krishnateja Avvari	Boys	Akkuzu (FRA); L 2–3	4 qB	Ranefur (SWE); L 1–3	Did not advance			25
Lily Zhang	Girls	Group D Park (KOR); W 3–1	1 Q	Lung (BEL); W 4–2	Khetkhuan (THA); W 4–1	Doo (HKG); L 1–4	Kato (JPN); W 4–2	3rd place, bronze medalist(s)
Lily Zhang	Girls	Zarif (FRA); W 3–1	1 Q	Lung (BEL); W 4–2	Khetkhuan (THA); W 4–1	Doo (HKG); L 1–4	Kato (JPN); W 4–2	3rd place, bronze medalist(s)
Lily Zhang	Girls	Kim (UZB); W 3–0	1 Q	Lung (BEL); W 4–2	Khetkhuan (THA); W 4–1	Doo (HKG); L 1–4	Kato (JPN); W 4–2	3rd place, bronze medalist(s)

Team

Athletes	Event	Group stage	Rank	Round of 16	Quarterfinals	Semifinals	Final / BM	Rank
Athletes	Event	Opposition Score	Rank	Opposition Score	Opposition Score	Opposition Score	Opposition Score	Rank
United States; Lily Zhang (USA); Krishnateja Avvari (USA)	Mixed	Chinese Taipei; L 1–2	3 qB	—N/a		Asia 1 W 2–0	Placement game Egypt; W 2–0	17
United States; Lily Zhang (USA); Krishnateja Avvari (USA)	Mixed	Africa 2 W walkover	3 qB	—N/a		Asia 1 W 2–0	Placement game Egypt; W 2–0	17
United States; Lily Zhang (USA); Krishnateja Avvari (USA)	Mixed	Europe 2 L 1–2	3 qB	—N/a		Asia 1 W 2–0	Placement game Egypt; W 2–0	17

Qualification Legend: Q=Main Bracket (medal); qB=Consolation Bracket (non-medal)

== Taekwondo ==
United States qualified one athlete, Kendall Yount, based on her performance at the Taekwondo Qualification Tournament.

Girls

Athlete	Event	Round of 16	Quarterfinals	Semifinals	Final	Rank
Athlete	Event	Opposition Result	Opposition Result	Opposition Result	Opposition Result	Rank
Kendall Yount	+63 kg	Rizzelli (ITA); W 4–3	Titoneli Guimaraes (BRA); W 2–1	Miiuts (UKR); W 9–4	Abdullaeva (UZB); W 4–2	1st place, gold medalist(s)

== Tennis ==
United States qualified two athletes based on the 9 June 2014 ITF World Junior Rankings.

Singles

Athlete	Event	Round of 32	Round of 16	Quarterfinals	Semifinals	Final / BM	Rank
Athlete	Event	Opposition Score	Opposition Score	Opposition Score	Opposition Score	Opposition Score	Rank
Alex Rybakov	Boys' Singles	Harris (RSA); L 6–7^{(10–12)}, 4–6	Did not advance				
Sofia Kenin	Girls' Singles	Shymanovich (BLR); L 2–6, 6–7^{(4–7)}	Did not advance				

Doubles

Athletes	Event	Round of 32	Round of 16	Quarterfinals	Semifinals	Final / BM	Rank
Athletes	Event	Opposition Score	Opposition Score	Opposition Score	Opposition Score	Opposition Score	Rank
Alex Rybakov (USA); Luis Valero (COL)	Boys' Doubles	—N/a	Bahamonde / Zukas (ARG); L 6–7^{(8–10)}, 3–6	Did not advance			
Sofia Kenin (USA); Renata Zarazua (MEX)	Girls' Doubles	—N/a	Ducu / Roșca (ROU); W 1–6, 7–5, [10–8]	Bains / Hon (AUS); W 7–6^{(7–3)}, 6–1	Kasatkina / Komardina (RUS); L 2–6, 4–6	Ostapenko (LAT); Paražinskaitė (LTU); L 3–6, 5–7	4
Sofia Kenin (USA); Alex Rybakov (USA)	Mixed Doubles	Singh (IND); Dissanayake (SRI); W 6–2, 4–6, [11–9]	Stefani / Luz (BRA); L 4–6, 4–6	Did not advance			

== Triathlon ==
United States qualified two athletes based on its performance at the 2014 American Youth Olympic Games Qualifier.

Individual

Athlete	Event	Swim (750m)	Trans 1	Bike (20 km)	Trans 2	Run (5 km)	Total Time	Rank
Seth Rider	Boys	9:30	0:44	28:47	0:25	16:57	56:23	12
Stephanie Jenks	Girls	10:26	0:49	31:20	0:27	17:31	1:00:33	2nd place, silver medalist(s)

Relay

Athlete	Event	Total Times per Athlete (Swim 250m, Bike 6.6 km, Run 1.8 km)	Total Group Time	Rank
America 1 Katherine Vanesa Clemant Materano (VEN); Javier Martin (CHI); Stephanie Jenks (USA); Charles Paquet (CAN)	Mixed Relay	23:14; 20:33; 22:08; 19:46	1:25:41	7
America 2 Emily Wagner (CAN); Eduardo Londono Naranjo (COL); Catalina Salazar (CHI); Seth Rider (USA)	Mixed Relay	21:31; 19:53; 23:56; 20:20	1:25:40	6

== Weightlifting ==
United States qualified 1 quota in the boys' and girls' events based on the team ranking after the 2014 Weightlifting Youth Pan American Championships.

Boys

Athlete	Event	Snatch		Clean & jerk		Total	Rank
Athlete	Event	Result	Rank	Result	Rank	Total	Rank
Ryan Sennett	+85 kg	NL		DNF		---	---

Girls

Athlete	Event	Snatch		Clean & jerk		Total	Rank
Athlete	Event	Result	Rank	Result	Rank	Total	Rank
Deirdre Lenzsch	+63 kg	90	7	110	7	200	7

== Wrestling ==
United States qualified three athletes based on its performance at the 2014 Pan American Cadet Championships.

Key:
- VT - Victory by Fall.
- PP - Decision by Points - the loser with technical points.
- PO - Decision by Points - the loser without technical points.

Boys

Athlete	Event	Group stage				Final / RM	Rank
Athlete	Event	Opposition Score	Opposition Score	Opposition Score	Rank	Opposition Score	Rank
Cade Olivas	Freestyle -46kg	Duyum (TUR); W 4–0	Gurdian Lopez (NCA); W 4–1	Hegab (EGY); W 4–0	1	Gadzhiev (RUS); L 1-3 ^{PP}	2nd place, silver medalist(s)
Daton Fix	Freestyle -54kg	Sejfulau (MKD); W 4–0 ^{ST}	Louw (RSA); W 4–0 ^{VT}	Al-Shebami (YEM); W 4–1 ^{ST}	1	Kuatbek (KAZ); L 1-3 ^{PP}	2nd place, silver medalist(s)
Mason Manville	Greco-Roman -69kg	Marshall (NZL); W 4–0	Soto (PER); W 4–0	Mosebach (GER); W 3–1	1	Dadov (AZE); L 0-3 ^{PO}	2nd place, silver medalist(s)
