= Bolivia at the 2014 Summer Youth Olympics =

- IOC code: BOL
- NOC: Bolivian Olympic Committee
- Website: https://www.comiteolimpicoboliviano.org.bo/

in Nanjing 16 – 28 August 2014
- Competitors: 7 in 5 sports
- Medals: Gold 0 Silver 0 Bronze 0 Total 0

Summer Youth Olympics appearances
- 2010; 2014; 2018; 2026

Bolivia competed at the 2014 Summer Youth Olympics, in Nanjing, China from 16 August to 28 August 2014.

== Athletics ==
Bolivia qualified one athlete.

Qualification Legend: Q=Final A (medal); qB=Final B (non-medal); qC=Final C (non-medal); qD=Final D (non-medal); qE=Final E (non-medal)

Boys
Track & road events

Athlete	Event	Final	
Athlete	Event	Result	Rank
Pablo Rodriguez	10 km walk	46:45.49	9

== Beach Volleyball ==
Bolivia qualified a girls' team from their performance at the 2014 CSV Youth Beach Volleyball Tour.

Athletes	Event	Preliminary round	Standing	Round of 24	Round of 16	Quarterfinals	Semifinals	Final / BM	Rank
Athletes	Event	Opposition Score	Standing	Opposition Score	Opposition Score	Opposition Score	Opposition Score	Opposition Score	Rank
Maria Fernanda Maida; Melanie Vargas	Girls'	Nkoka/Moyipele (CGO); W 2 – 0	3 Q	Enzo/Lantignotti (ITA); L 0 – 2	did not advance				17
Maria Fernanda Maida; Melanie Vargas	Girls'	Schnieder/Arnholdt (GER); L 0 – 2	3 Q	Enzo/Lantignotti (ITA); L 0 – 2	did not advance				17
Maria Fernanda Maida; Melanie Vargas	Girls'	Wang/Yuan (CHN); W 2 – 0	3 Q	Enzo/Lantignotti (ITA); L 0 – 2	did not advance				17
Maria Fernanda Maida; Melanie Vargas	Girls'	Ragillia/Andriani (INA); L 0 – 2	3 Q	Enzo/Lantignotti (ITA); L 0 – 2	did not advance				17
Maria Fernanda Maida; Melanie Vargas	Girls'	Ward/Davidson (TRI); W 2 – 0	3 Q	Enzo/Lantignotti (ITA); L 0 – 2	did not advance				17

== Cycling ==
Bolivia qualified a girls' team based on its ranking issued by the UCI.

Team

Athletes	Event	Cross-Country Eliminator		Time Trial			BMX		Cross-Country Race			Road Race			Total Pts	Rank
Athletes	Event	Rank	Points	Time	Rank	Points	Rank	Points	Time	Rank	Points	Time	Rank	Points	Total Pts	Rank
~~Jhessica Herrera~~; Maria Peinado	Girls' Team	25	0	DNS		0	5	80	DNS		0	DNF		0	80	14

Mixed Relay

Athletes	Event	Cross-Country Girls' Race	Cross-Country Boys' Race	Boys' Road Race	Girls' Road Race	Total Time	Rank
Maria Peinado (BOL); Abderrahim Zahiri (MAR); Mohcine Elkouraji (MAR); Clementine Niyonsaba (RWA)	Mixed Team Relay	4:25	3:24	5:40	5:15	20:44	26

== Fencing ==
Bolivia was given a quota to compete by the tripartite committee.

Girls

Athlete	Event	Pool Round	Seed	Round of 16	Quarterfinals	Semifinals	Final / BM	Rank
Athlete	Event	Opposition Score	Seed	Opposition Score	Opposition Score	Opposition Score	Opposition Score	Rank
Dennisse Clavijo	Foil	M Guillaume (FRA); L 0 – 5 K Miyawaki (JPN); L 0 – 5 A Huang (CHN); L 2 – 5 G Cecchini (BRA); L 0 – 5 F Pasztor (HUN); L 1 – 5 S Massialas (USA); L 0 – 5	14	F Pasztor (HUN); L 5 – 15	did not advance			14

== Swimming ==
Bolivia qualified two swimmers.

Boys

Athlete	Event	Heat		Semifinal		Final	
Athlete	Event	Time	Rank	Time	Rank	Time	Rank
Jose Alberto Quintanilla	50 m freestyle	24.61	30	did not advance			
Jose Alberto Quintanilla	50 m butterfly	26.17	33	did not advance			

Girls

Athlete	Event	Heat		Semifinal		Final	
Athlete	Event	Time	Rank	Time	Rank	Time	Rank
Maria Jose Ribera	50 m freestyle	27.55	32	did not advance			
Maria Jose Ribera	50 m butterfly	29.53	28	did not advance			
