= Chile at the 2014 Summer Youth Olympics =

- IOC code: CHI
- NOC: Chilean Olympic Committee
- Website: www.coc.org.co (in Spanish)

in Nanjing
- Competitors: 15 in 9 sports
- Medals: Gold 0 Silver 0 Bronze 0 Total 0

Summer Youth Olympics appearances
- 2010; 2014; 2018; 2026

Chile competed at the 2014 Summer Youth Olympics, in Nanjing, China from 16 August to 28 August 2014.

== Medalists ==
Medals awarded to participants of mixed-NOC (Combined) teams are represented in italics. These medals are not counted towards the individual NOC medal tally.

Medal	Name	Sport	Event	Date
Silver	Antoine Porte	Equestrian	Team Jumping	20 August

== Athletics ==
Chile qualified two athletes.

Qualification Legend: Q=Final A (medal); qB=Final B (non-medal); qC=Final C (non-medal); qD=Final D (non-medal); qE=Final E (non-medal)

Boys
Track & road events

Athlete	Event	Heats		Final	
Athlete	Event	Result	Rank	Result	Rank
Diego Delmonaco	110 m hurdles	13.74	10 qB	13.76	8

Field Events

Athlete	Event	Qualification		Final	
Athlete	Event	Distance	Rank	Distance	Rank
Jose Ballivian	Discus throw	51.40	15 qB	50.88	6

== Equestrian ==
Chile qualified a rider.

Athlete	Horse	Event	Round 1		Round 2			Total	
Athlete	Horse	Event	Penalties	Rank	Penalties	Total	Rank	Penalties	Rank
Antoine Porte	Zyralynn	Individual Jumping	8	16	Retired				
South America; Martina Campi (ARG); Bianca de Souza Rodrigues (BRA); Antoine Porte (CHI); Valeria Jimenez Caballero (PAR); Francisco Calvelo Martinez (URU)	Darina; La Gomera; Zyralynn; Cenai; Lord Power	Team Jumping	4; ~~EL~~; ~~20~~; 0; 0	2	0; ~~20~~; ~~8~~; 0; 0	4	2	4	2nd place, silver medalist(s)

== Modern Pentathlon ==
Chile qualified one athlete based on its performance at the PANAM YOG Qualifiers.

Athlete	Event	Fencing Ranking Round (épée one touch)		Swimming (200 m freestyle)			Fencing Final Round (épée one touch)			Combined: Shooting/Running (10 m air pistol)/(3000 m)			Total Points	Final Rank
Athlete	Event	Results	Rank	Time	Rank	Points	Results	Rank	Points	Time	Rank	Points	Total Points	Final Rank
Javiera Rosas	Girls' Individual		15	2:22.96	14	272		14	240	15:09.51	19	391	903	20
Team 20; Javiera Rosas (CHI); Yavor Peshleevski (BUL)	Mixed Relay		15	2:02.27; 1:05.30; 0:56.97	10	334		15	258	12:35.10	14	545	1137	16

== Rowing ==
Chile qualified two boats based on its performance at the Latin American Qualification Regatta.

Athlete	Event	Heats		Repechage		Final	
Athlete	Event	Time	Rank	Time	Rank	Time	Rank
Cesar Abaroa; Sebastian Romo Figueroa	Boys' Pairs	3:15.68	4 R	3:16.46	4 FB	3:23.44	10
Antonia Abraham; Melita Abraham	Girls' Pairs	3:33.25	2 R	3:34.76	1 FA	3:39.89	5

Qualification Legend: FA=Final A (medal); FB=Final B (non-medal); FC=Final C (non-medal); FD=Final D (non-medal); SA/B=Semifinals A/B; SC/D=Semifinals C/D; R=Repechage

== Sailing ==
Chile qualified one boat based on its performance at the Byte CII Central & South American Continental Qualifier. Later they were given a reallocation spot based on being a top ranked nation not yet qualified.

Athlete	Event	Race											Net Points	Final Rank
Athlete	Event	1	2	3	4	5	6	7	8	9	10	M*	Net Points	Final Rank
Clemente Seguel	Boys' Byte CII	6	7	13	(25)	18	6	15	11	Cancelled		101.00	76.00	12
Kelly Gonzalez	Girls' Byte CII	11	(28)	22	26	21	26	18	30	Cancelled		182.00	154.00	26

== Swimming ==
Chile qualified one swimmer.

Boys

Athlete	Event	Final	
Athlete	Event	Time	Rank
Alonso Perez	800 m freestyle	8:33.17	23

== Taekwondo ==
Chile qualified one athlete based on its performance at the Taekwondo Qualification Tournament.

Boys

Athlete	Event	Round of 16	Quarterfinals	Semifinals	Final	Rank
Athlete	Event	Opposition Result	Opposition Result	Opposition Result	Opposition Result	Rank
Gerard Arriagada	−55 kg	Joo (KOR); L 5 - 11	did not advance			9

== Triathlon ==
Chile qualified two athletes based on its performance at the 2014 American Youth Olympic Games Qualifier.

Individual

Athlete	Event	Swim (750m)	Trans 1	Bike (20 km)	Trans 2	Run (5 km)	Total Time	Rank
Javier Martin	Boys	09:39	00:43	28:40	00:23	16:07	0:55:32	5
Catalina Salazar	Girls	10:40	00:48	33:12	00:25	19:39	1:04:44	19

Relay

Athlete	Event	Total Times per Athlete (Swim 250m, Bike 6.6 km, Run 1.8 km)	Total Group Time	Rank
America 1 Katherine Vanesa Clemant Materano (VEN); Javier Martin (CHI); Stephanie Jenks (USA); Charles Paquet (CAN)	Mixed Relay	23:14; 20:33; 22:08; 19:46	1:25:41	7
America 2 Emily Wagner (CAN); Eduardo Londono Naranjo (COL); Catalina Salazar (CHI); Seth Rider (USA)	Mixed Relay	21:31; 19:53; 23:56; 20:20	1:25:40	6

== Weightlifting ==
Chile was given a reallocation spot for being a top ranked nation not yet qualified.

Girls

Athlete	Event	Snatch		Clean & jerk		Total	Rank
Athlete	Event	Result	Rank	Result	Rank	Total	Rank
Lenka Rojas	+63 kg	78	10	96	10	174	10
