= Athletics at the 2014 Summer Youth Olympics – Boys' hammer throw =

Athletics – Boys' hammer throw at the II Summer Youth Olympic Games
- Venue: Nanjing Olympic Sports Centre
- Date: August 21–24
- Competitors: 15 from 15 nations

Medalists
1st place, gold medalist(s)		Hlib Piskunov	Ukraine
2nd place, silver medalist(s)		Bence Halász	Hungary
3rd place, bronze medalist(s)		Ahmed Tarek Ismail	Egypt

The boys’ hammer throw competition at the 2014 Summer Youth Olympics was held on 21–24 August 2014 in Nanjing Olympic Sports Center.

== Schedule ==
Date	Time	Round
21 August 2014	20:15	Qualification
24 August 2014	20:20	Final

== Results ==
=== Qualification ===
First 50% of the athletes from the Qualification round progress to the A Final and the remaining athletes to the B Final.

Rank	Athlete	1	2	3	4	Result	Notes	Q
1	Bence Halász (HUN)	80.73	83.68	-	-	83.68		FA
2	Ahmed Tarek Ismail (EGY)	77.51	x	75.46	-	77.51		FA
3	Hlib Piskunov (UKR)	76.28	77.17	75.85	-	77.17		FA
4	Ned Weatherly (AUS)	x	75.59	74.83	73.28	75.59	PB	FA
5	Tomas Vasiliauskas (LTU)	69.16	71.39	75.06	71.46	75.06		FA
6	Petr Nekiporets (RUS)	74.47	71.87	72.35	71.67	74.47		FA
7	Aléxios Prodanás (GRE)	70.05	x	72.08	73.52	73.52		FA
8	Adam Patrick King (IRL)	68.87	71.85	71.91	x	71.91	PB	FA
9	Adrian Muszyński (POL)	71.44	68.34	x	x	71.44	PB	FB
10	Tiziano Di Blasio (ITA)	x	66.07	69.76	70.08	70.08		FB
11	Georg Kaspar Räni (EST)	67.96	x	x	x	67.96		FB
12	Hussein Al-Bayati (IRQ)	64.04	63.23	x	67.73	67.73	PB	FB
13	Firas Ben Said (TUN)	60.77	x	61.09	63.21	63.21	PB	FB
14	Kenneth Brinson (USA)	63.20	x	x	x	63.20		FB
15	Giorgi Oniani (GEO)	x	x	59.86	x	59.86		FB

=== Finals ===
==== Final A ====
Rank	Final Placing	Athlete	1	2	3	4	Result	Notes
1st place, gold medalist(s)	1	Hlib Piskunov (UKR)	79.95	82.65	x	x	82.65	PB
2nd place, silver medalist(s)	2	Bence Halász (HUN)	x	x	81.44	81.90	81.90	
3rd place, bronze medalist(s)	3	Ahmed Tarek Ismail (EGY)	77.67	78.52	78.59	74.27	78.59	PB
4	4	Tomas Vasiliauskas (LTU)	71.92	75.53	x	77.49	77.49	
5	5	Ned Weatherly (AUS)	69.90	73.19	x	74.10	74.10	
6	6	Petr Nekiporets (RUS)	x	71.81	72.58	72.61	72.61	
7	7	Aléxios Prodanás (GRE)	67.02	x	71.68	71.71	71.71	
8	8	Adam Patrick King (IRL)	68.53	70.52	x	71.49	71.49	

==== Final B ====
Rank	Final Placing	Athlete	1	2	3	4	Result	Notes
1	9	Tiziano Di Blasio (ITA)	69.26	68.47	68.55	69.58	69.58	
2	10	Hussein Al-Bayati (IRQ)	66.60	x	x	68.01	68.01	PB
3	11	Adrian Muszyński (POL)	67.69	60.84	x	65.22	67.69	
4	12	Georg Kaspar Räni (EST)	65.28	67.17	x	x	67.17	
5	13	Giorgi Oniani (GEO)	60.45	64.92	x	x	64.92	
6	14	Kenneth Brinson (USA)	x	55.44	59.51	x	59.51	
7	15	Firas Ben Said (TUN)	x	58.99	x	58.29	58.99	
