= Athletics at the 2014 Summer Youth Olympics – Girls' 100 metre hurdles =

Athletics – Girls' 100 metres hurdles at the II Summer Youth Olympic Games
- Venue: Nanjing Olympic Sports Centre
- Date: August 20–23
- Competitors: 19 from 19 nations

Medalists
1st place, gold medalist(s)		Laura Valette	France
2nd place, silver medalist(s)		Elvira Herman	Belarus
3rd place, bronze medalist(s)		Chloë Beaucarne	Belgium

The girls’ 100 metres hurdles competition at the 2014 Summer Youth Olympics was held on 20–23 August 2014 in Nanjing Olympic Sports Center.

== Schedule ==
Date	Time	Round
20 August 2014	19:20	Heats
23 August 2014	09:24	Final

== Results ==
=== Heats ===
Eight fastest athletes advanced to Final A, the others advanced to Final B or C according to their times.

Rank	Heat	Lane	Athlete	Result	Notes	Q
1	3	7	Laura Valette (FRA)	13.34	PB	FA
2	2	2	Elvira Herman (BLR)	13.43		FA
3	2	4	Chloë Beaucarne (BEL)	13.46	PB	FA
4	3	3	Jeminise Sade Parris (TTO)	13.62	PB	FA
5	3	2	Janeek Brown (JAM)	13.66		FA
5	1	6	Klaudia Sorok (HUN)	13.66		FA
7	2	3	Kimani Rushing (USA)	13.73	PB	FA
8	1	5	Natalia Christofi (CYP)	13.80		FA
9	1	7	Rachel Pace (AUS)	13.83		FB
9	1	2	Nana Fujimori (JPN)	13.83		FB
11	2	5	Martina Millo (ITA)	13.93		FB
12	3	4	Steffi Murillo (PER)	14.06		FB
13	2	8	Taylon Bieldt (RSA)	14.18		FB
14	3	6	Inara Cortez (ECU)	14.31		FB
15	1	4	Paolla Luchin (BRA)	14.32		FC
16	1	3	Émanuelle Massé (CAN)	14.49		FC
17	2	7	Nur Izlyn Zani (SIN)	14.58		FC
18	3	5	Deya Erickson (IVB)	14.76		FC
19	2	6	Dayana Ramos (COL)	14.92		FC

=== Finals ===
==== Final A ====
Rank	Final Placing	Lane	Athlete	Result	Notes
1st place, gold medalist(s)	1	5	Laura Valette (FRA)	13.34	=PB
2nd place, silver medalist(s)	2	7	Elvira Herman (BLR)	13.38	
3rd place, bronze medalist(s)	3	4	Chloë Beaucarne (BEL)	13.61	
4	4	8	Klaudia Sorok (HUN)	13.66	
5	5	6	Jeminise Sade Parris (TTO)	13.76	
6	6	9	Janeek Brown (JAM)	13.91	
7	7	2	Natalia Christofi (CYP)	13.99	
8	8	3	Kimani Rushing (USA)	14.05	

==== Final B ====
Rank	Final Placing	Lane	Athlete	Result	Notes
1	9	2	Rachel Pace (AUS)	14.07	
2	10	3	Steffi Murillo (PER)	14.25	
3	11	6	Inara Cortez (ECU)	14.36	
4	12	4	Martina Millo (ITA)	14.67	
		5	Nana Fujimori (JPN)	DSQ	
		7	Taylon Bieldt (RSA)	DNS	

==== Final C ====
Rank	Final Placing	Lane	Athlete	Result	Notes
1	13	4	Paolla Luchin (BRA)	14.16	
2	14	5	Émanuelle Massé (CAN)	14.36	
3	15	7	Dayana Ramos (COL)	14.86	
4	16	6	Nur Izlyn Zani (SIN)	15.60	
		3	Deya Erickson (IVB)	DNS	
