= Athletics at the 2014 Summer Youth Olympics – Boys' discus throw =

Athletics – Boys' discus throw at the II Summer Youth Olympic Games
- Venue: Nanjing Olympic Sports Centre
- Date: August 20–23
- Competitors: 17 from 17 nations

Medalists
1st place, gold medalist(s)		Cheng Yulong	China
2nd place, silver medalist(s)		Clemens Prüfer	Germany
3rd place, bronze medalist(s)		Ruslan Valitov	Ukraine

The boys’ discus throw competition at the 2014 Summer Youth Olympics was held on 20–23 August 2014 in Nanjing Olympic Sports Center.

== Schedule ==
Date	Time	Round
20 August 2014	20:20	Qualification
23 August 2014	19:05	Final

== Results ==
=== Qualification ===
First 50% of the athletes from the Qualification round progress to the A Final and the remaining athletes to the B Final.

Rank	Athlete	1	2	3	4	Result	Notes	Q
1	Cheng Yulong (CHN)	59.88	59.81	58.83	58.43	59.88		FA
2	Clemens Prüfer (GER)	x	59.25	59.88	57.04	59.88		FA
3	Pavol Žencár (SVK)	x	x	x	59.64	59.64		FA
4	Ruslan Valitov (UKR)	x	55.41	56.97	55.71	56.97	PB	FA
5	Tyler Merkley (USA)	x	56.61	x	x	56.61	PB	FA
6	Yume Ando (JPN)	54.24	x	52.93	55.87	55.87		FA
7	Stefan Mura (MDA)	x	x	55.57	55.27	55.57		FA
8	Andréas Thanásis (GRE)	48.53	x	55.36	x	55.36		FA
9	Mithravarun Senthil Kumar (IND)	54.67	51.89	x	54.71	54.71	SB	FA
10	Zakaria Al Ahmer (LBA)	54.66	50.22	50.85	54.67	54.67		FB
11	Vashon Mccarty (JAM)	x	50.20	x	53.85	53.85		FB
12	Eoin Sheridan (IRL)	52.71	x	53.63	51.22	53.63		FB
13	Hassan Elshabnawry (EGY)	51.12	52.51	x	51.87	52.51		FB
14	Maycon Bonadeo (BRA)	50.57	x	51.28	51.65	51.65		FB
15	José Miguel Ballivián (CHI)	x	50.53	x	51.40	51.40		FB
16	Josh Boateng (GRN)	x	x	51.24	49.60	51.24	PB	FB
	Taui Saiasi Hauma (TUV)	x	x	x	x	NM		FB

=== Finals ===
==== Final A ====
Rank	Final Placing	Athlete	1	2	3	4	Result	Notes
1st place, gold medalist(s)	1	Cheng Yulong (CHN)	61.02	x	63.05	64.14	64.14	PB
2nd place, silver medalist(s)	2	Clemens Prüfer (GER)	x	x	60.62	63.52	63.52	
3rd place, bronze medalist(s)	3	Ruslan Valitov (UKR)	54.17	57.48	52.77	x	57.48	PB
4	4	Yume Ando (JPN)	53.57	55.31	x	57.36	57.36	
5	5	Mithravarun Senthil Kumar (IND)	57.06	x	55.03	54.79	57.06	PB
6	6	Andréas Thanásis (GRE)	56.80	53.14	54.81	x	56.80	PB
7	7	Tyler Merkley (USA)	55.04	x	56.27	x	56.61	
8	8	Stefan Mura (MDA)	49.81	x	x	x	55.57	
		Pavol Žencár (SVK)	x	x	x	x	NM	

==== Final B ====
Rank	Final Placing	Athlete	1	2	3	4	Result	Notes
1	9	Hassan Elshabnawry (EGY)	x	56.39	x	x	56.39	
2	10	Vashon Mccarty (JAM)	x	54.66	55.63	53.62	55.63	PB
3	11	Maycon Bonadeo (BRA)	53.02	x	54.15	53.99	54.15	
4	12	Zakaria Al Ahmer (LBA)	53.79	x	51.63	x	53.79	
5	13	Eoin Sheridan (IRL)	x	47.88	x	51.19	51.19	
6	14	José Miguel Ballivián (CHI)	x	50.05	x	50.88	50.88	
7	15	Josh Boateng (GRN)	48.22	49.06	48.44	50.07	50.07	
8	16	Taui Saiasi Hauma (TUV)	31.71	x	31.26	33.45	33.45	PB
