= Swimming at the 2014 Summer Youth Olympics – Boys' 800 metre freestyle =

Boys' 800 metre freestyle at the 2014 Summer Youth Olympics
- Venue: Nanjing Olympic Sports Centre
- Dates: 21 August
- Competitors: 25 from 24 nations
- Winning time: 7:54.29

Medalists
gold medal	Ahmed Akram	Egypt
silver medal	Mykhailo Romanchuk	Ukraine
bronze medal	Henrik Christiansen	Norway

The boys' 800 metre freestyle event in swimming at the 2014 Summer Youth Olympics took place on 21 August at the Nanjing Olympic Sports Centre in Nanjing, China.

This event was a timed-final where each swimmer swam just once. The top 8 seeded swimmers swam in the evening, and the remaining swimmers swam in the morning sessions.

== Results ==
The first round was held on August 21, at 10:53, and the final was held on August 21, at 18:00.

Rank	Heat	Lane	Name	Nationality	Time	Notes
1st place, gold medalist(s)	4	3	Ahmed Akram	Egypt	7:54.29	
2nd place, silver medalist(s)	4	7	Mykhailo Romanchuk	Ukraine	7:56.34	
3rd place, bronze medalist(s)	4	5	Henrik Christiansen	Norway	7:57.07	
4	4	4	Wojciech Wojdak	Poland	8:02.38	
5	3	7	Marcelo Acosta	El Salvador	8:02.69	
6	3	3	Patrick Ransford	United States	8:04.46	
7	2	3	Alexei Sancov	Moldova	8:06.54	
8	4	8	Sven Saemundsson	Croatia	8:06.72	
9	3	6	Ido Haber	Israel	8:09.92	
10	3	1	Ricardo Vargas	Mexico	8:10.55	
11	4	2	Rahiti De Vos	France	8:11.82	
12	4	1	Vuk Čelić	Serbia	8:14.95	
13	4	6	Michael Mincham	New Zealand	8:15.47	
14	3	4	Brent Szurdoki	South Africa	8:15.50	
15	2	5	Welson Sim	Malaysia	8:15.84	
16	2	6	Rafael Gil	Portugal	8:16.91	
17	2	2	Grega Popović	Slovenia	8:19.37	
18	2	8	Colin Gilbert	Canada	8:20.43	
19	3	2	Marc Vivas	Spain	8:23.65	
20	3	5	Marc Hinawi	Israel	8:28.67	
21	1	4	Luis Vega Torres	Cuba	8:31.85	
22	2	7	Yudai Amada	Japan	8:32.43	
23	1	5	Alonso Perez	Chile	8:33.17	
24	2	4	Tanakrit Kittiya	Thailand	8:34.26	
25	2	1	Pol Arias	Andorra	8:47.46	
	3	8	Nils Liess	Switzerland	DNS	
