= Senegal at the 2014 Summer Youth Olympics =

- IOC code: SEN
- NOC: Comité National Olympique et Sportif Sénégalais

in Nanjing
- Competitors: 6 in 6 sports
- Medals: Gold 0 Silver 0 Bronze 0 Total 0

Summer Youth Olympics appearances
- 2010; 2014; 2018; 2026

Senegal competed at the 2014 Summer Youth Olympics, in Nanjing, China from 16 August to 28 August 2014.

== Athletics ==
Senegal qualified one athlete.

Qualification Legend: Q=Final A (medal); qB=Final B (non-medal); qC=Final C (non-medal); qD=Final D (non-medal); qE=Final E (non-medal)

Boys
Field Events

Athlete	Event	Qualification		Final	
Athlete	Event	Distance	Rank	Distance	Rank
Lansana Marico	Triple jump	13.48	17 qB	13.96	12

== Canoeing ==
Senegal qualified one boat based on its performance at the 2013 World Junior Canoe Sprint and Slalom Championships.

Boys

Athlete	Event	Qualification		Repechage		Round of 16		Quarterfinals	Semifinals	Final / BM	Rank
Athlete	Event	Time	Rank	Time	Rank	Time	Rank	Opposition Result	Opposition Result	Opposition Result	Rank
Mamadou Diallo	C1 sprint	DNS		—N/a		did not advance					
Mamadou Diallo	K1 slalom	1:32.988	13 Q	Cancelled		1:27.007	12	did not advance			
Mamadou Diallo	K1 sprint	1:55.509	16 R	1:53.616	7 Q	1:52.801	15	did not advance			

== Equestrian ==
Senegal qualified a rider.

Athlete	Horse	Event	Round 1		Round 2			Total	
Athlete	Horse	Event	Penalties	Rank	Penalties	Total	Rank	Penalties	Rank
Maeva Boyer	Cornetta	Individual Jumping	4	11	12	16	15	16	15
Africa; Mohamed Hayab (EGY); Lilia Maamar (MAR); Maeva Boyer (SEN); Alexa Stais (RSA); Sophie Teede (ZIM)	White Lady; Figaro; Cornetta; Dominand; Carsar	Team Jumping	0; 4; 8; ~~18~~; ~~8~~	4	0; ~~16~~; 0; ~~12~~; 4	16	4	16	4

== Fencing ==
Senegal was given a quota to compete by the tripartite committee.

Girls

Athlete	Event	Pool Round	Seed	Round of 16	Quarterfinals	Semifinals	Final / BM	Rank
Athlete	Event	Opposition Score	Seed	Opposition Score	Opposition Score	Opposition Score	Opposition Score	Rank
Ndeye Ciss	Sabre	M Emura (JPN); L 3 – 5 T Gkountoura (GRE); L 0 – 5 F Kose (TUR); L 4 – 5 A Moseyko (RUS); L 0 – 5 S Matuszak (POL); L 3 – 5 A Koutoglo (TOG); L 4 – 5	13	T Gkountoura (GRE); L 3 – 15	did not advance			13

== Judo ==
Senegal was given a quota to compete by the tripartite committee.

Individual

Athlete	Event	Round of 32	Round of 16	Quarterfinals	Semifinals	Rep 1	Rep 2	Rep 3	Rep 4	Final / BM	Rank
Athlete	Event	Opposition Result	Opposition Result	Opposition Result	Opposition Result	Opposition Result	Opposition Result	Opposition Result	Opposition Result	Opposition Result	Rank
Ndiaye Saliou	Boys' -81 kg	Y Lo (TPE); L 0001 – 1003	did not advance			I Vardi (ISR); W 1000 – 0003	A Egutidze (POR); L 0000 – 1000	did not advance			13

Team

Athletes	Event	Round of 16	Quarterfinals	Semifinals	Final	Rank
Athletes	Event	Opposition Result	Opposition Result	Opposition Result	Opposition Result	Rank
Team Kerr; Sophie Berger (BEL); Karla Lorenzana (GUA); Saliou Ndiaye (SEN); Jennifer Schwille (GER); Oussama Snoussi (TUN); Pawel Wawrzyczek (POL); Bauyrzhan Zhauyntayev (KAZ)	Mixed Team	Team Berghmans (MIX); L 2 – 4	did not advance			9

== Taekwondo ==
Senegal was given a wild card to compete.

Girls

Athlete	Event	Round of 16	Quarterfinals	Semifinals	Final	Rank
Athlete	Event	Opposition Result	Opposition Result	Opposition Result	Opposition Result	Rank
Mame Dieng	+63 kg	C Munave (SWZ); L 5 – 6	did not advance			9
