= Greece at the 2014 Summer Youth Olympics =

- IOC code: GRE
- NOC: Hellenic Olympic Committee
- Website: www.hoc.gr

in Nanjing
- Competitors: 22 in 8 sports
- Medals Ranked 61st: Gold 0 Silver 2 Bronze 1 Total 3

Summer Youth Olympics appearances
- 2010; 2014; 2018; 2026

Greece competed at the 2014 Summer Youth Olympics, in Nanjing, China from 16 August to 28 August 2014.

== Medalists ==
Medals awarded to participants of mixed-NOC (Combined) teams are represented in italics. These medals are not counted towards the individual NOC medal tally.

Medal	Name	Sport	Event	Date
Silver	Athina Angelopoulou	Rowing	Girls' single sculls	20 August
Silver	Apostolos Christou	Swimming	50 m backstroke	20 August
Bronze	Marios Giakoumatos	Fencing	Mixed Team	20 August

== Athletics ==
Greece qualified six athletes.

Qualification Legend: Q=Final A (medal); qB=Final B (non-medal); qC=Final C (non-medal); qD=Final D (non-medal); qE=Final E (non-medal)

Boys
Field events

Athlete	Event	Qualification		Final	
Athlete	Event	Distance	Rank	Distance	Rank
Georgios Triantafyllou	Pole vault	4.80	7 Q	4.65	8
Andreas Thanasis	Discus throw	55.36	8 Q	56.80 PB	6
Alexios Prodanas	Hammer throw	73.52	7 Q	71.71	7

Girls
Track & road events

Athlete	Event	Final	
Athlete	Event	Result	Rank
Athanasia Vaitsi	5 km walk	24:22.21 PB	5

Field events

Athlete	Event	Qualification		Final	
Athlete	Event	Distance	Rank	Distance	Rank
Konstantina Romaiou	Triple jump	12.35	8 qB	12.21	10
Efi Karastogianni	Hammer throw	59.76	11 qB	57.20	13

== Cycling ==
Greece qualified a boys' team based on its ranking issued by the UCI.

Team

Athletes	Event	Cross-Country Eliminator		Time Trial			BMX		Cross-Country Race			Road Race			Total Points	Rank
Athletes	Event	Rank	Points	Time	Rank	Points	Rank	Points	Time	Rank	Points	Time	Rank	Points	Total Points	Rank
Stefanos Vasilantonakis; Nikolaos Zegklis	Boys' Team	16	1	5:38.25	27	0	17	0	-2 LAP	18	0	1:38:14; 1:37:35	44; 32	0	1	26

Mixed Relay

Athletes	Event	Cross-Country Girls' Race	Cross-Country Boys' Race	Boys' Road Race	Girls' Road Race	Total Time	Rank
Andrea Contreras (VEN); Mohamed Imam (EGY); Nikolaos Zegklis (GRE); Daryorie Arrieche (VEN)	Mixed Team Relay						23

== Fencing ==
Greece qualified three athletes based on its performance at the 2014 FIE Cadet World Championships.

Boys

Athlete	Event	Pool Round	Seed	Round of 16	Quarterfinals	Semifinals	Final / BM	Rank
Athlete	Event	Opposition Score	Seed	Opposition Score	Opposition Score	Opposition Score	Opposition Score	Rank
Marios Giakoumatos	Sabre	P di Martino (ARG) N Shengelia (GEO) F Ferjani (TUN) N Kassymov (KAZ) A Muhammad (BRU); W 5-1; K Metryka (USA); W 5-3		Bye	Yan (CHN); L 11-15	did not advance		5

Girls

Athlete	Event	Pool Round	Seed	Round of 16	Quarterfinals	Semifinals	Final / BM	Rank
Athlete	Event	Opposition Score	Seed	Opposition Score	Opposition Score	Opposition Score	Opposition Score	Rank
Aikaterini Kontochristopoulou	Foil	Zhao (CAN) Elsharkawy (EGY) Lau (HKG) Borella (ITA) Szymczak (POL) Martyanova (RUS)		Martyonova (RUS); L 11-15	did not advance			9
Theodora Gkountoura	Sabre	Emura (JPN) Köse (TUR) Moseyko (RUS) Matuszak (POL) Koutogle (TOG); W 5-2; Ciss (SEN); W 5-0		Ciss (SEN); W 15-3	Emura (JPN); L 13-15	did not advance		5

Mixed Team

Athletes	Event	Round of 16	Quarterfinals	Semifinals / PM	Final / PM	Rank
Athletes	Event	Opposition Score	Opposition Score	Opposition Score	Opposition Score	Rank
Team Europe 2 Marios Giakoumatos (GRE); Chiara Grovari (ITA); Linus Islas (SWE); Asa Linde (SWE); Enguerand Roger (FRA); Anna Szymczak (POL)	Team	Bye	Team America 1 (MIX); W 30-24	Team Asia-Oceania 1 (MIX); L 29-30	Team Asia-Oceania 2 (MIX); W 30-25	3rd place, bronze medalist(s)
Team Europe 4 Theodora Gkountoura (GRE); Claudia Borella (ITA); Inna Brovko (UKR); Tudor Cucu (ROU); Petar Files (CRO); Samuel Unterhauser (GER)	Team	Bye	Team Asia-Oceania 1 (MIX); L 22-30	Team America 1 (MIX); W 30-27	Team America 2 (MIX); L 28-30	6

== Gymnastics ==
=== Artistic Gymnastics ===
Greece qualified one athlete based on its performance at the 2014 European MAG Championships and another athlete based on its performance at the 2014 European WAG Championships.

Boys

Athlete	Event	Apparatus						Total	Rank
Athlete	Event	F	PH	R	V	PB	HB	Total	Rank
Antonios Tantalidis	Qualification	12.900	11.800	12.950	13.775	11.550	10.550	73.525	32

Girls

Athlete	Event	Apparatus				Total	Rank
Athlete	Event	F	V	UB	BB	Total	Rank
Evangelia Monokrousou	Qualification	11.150	13.350	9.950	11.400	45.850	29

== Rowing ==
Greece qualified two boats based on its performance at the 2013 World Rowing Junior Championships.

Athlete	Event	Heats		Repechage		Semifinals		Final	
Athlete	Event	Time	Rank	Time	Rank	Time	Rank	Time	Rank
Nikolaos Kakouris; Thomas Karamitros	Boys' pair	3:15.96	5 R	3:14.78	3 FB	—N/a		3:18.90	7
Athina Angelopoulou	Girls' single sculls	3:48.34	2 R	3:54.79	2 SA/B	3:46.82	1 FA	3:51.59	2nd place, silver medalist(s)

Qualification Legend: FA=Final A (medal); FB=Final B (non-medal); FC=Final C (non-medal); FD=Final D (non-medal); SA/B=Semifinals A/B; SC/D=Semifinals C/D; R=Repechage

== Sailing ==
Greece qualified one boat based on its performance at the Byte CII European Continental Qualifiers.

Athlete	Event	Race											Net Points	Final Rank
Athlete	Event	1	2	3	4	5	6	7	8	9	10	M*	Net Points	Final Rank
Georgios Papadopoulos-Kouklakis	Boys' Byte CII	25	26	26	(29)	26	12	20	21	Cancelled		185	156	27

== Shooting ==
Greece qualified one shooter based on its performance at the 2014 European Shooting Championships.

Individual

Athlete	Event	Qualification		Final	
Athlete	Event	Points	Rank	Points	Rank
Anna Korakaki	Girls' 10 m air pistol	380	2 Q	156.5	4

Team

Athletes	Event	Qualification		Round of 16	Quarterfinals	Semifinals	Final / BM	Rank
Athletes	Event	Points	Rank	Opposition Result	Opposition Result	Opposition Result	Opposition Result	Rank
Anna Korakaki (GRE); Dmitrii Gutnik (KGZ)	Team 10 m air pistol	724	18	did not advance				18

== Swimming ==
Greece qualified four swimmers.

Boys

Athlete	Event	Heat		Semifinal		Final	
Athlete	Event	Time	Rank	Time	Rank	Time	Rank
Fotios Mylonas	50 m freestyle	23.14	9 Q	23.07	9	did not advance	
Fotios Mylonas	100 m freestyle	52.03	26	did not advance			
Apostolos Christou	50 m backstroke	25.96	4 Q	25.63	3 Q	25.44	2nd place, silver medalist(s)
Apostolos Christou	100 m backstroke	55.99	6 Q	55.09	4 Q	55.06	4
Apostolos Christou	200 m backstroke	2:04.45	13	—N/a		did not advance	

Girls

Athlete	Event	Heat		Semifinal		Final	
Athlete	Event	Time	Rank	Time	Rank	Time	Rank
Elisavet Panti	50 m freestyle	26.99	26	did not advance			
Elisavet Panti	100 m freestyle	58.47	27	did not advance			
Elisavet Panti	50 m backstroke	30.41	28	did not advance			
Eleni Koutsouveli	50 m backstroke	29.31	6 Q	29.28	7 Q	29.30	7
Eleni Koutsouveli	100 m backstroke	1:03.48	17	did not advance			
Eleni Koutsouveli	200 m backstroke	2:15.46	8 Q	—N/a		2:15.61	8
