= Grenada at the 2014 Summer Youth Olympics =

- IOC code: GRN
- NOC: Grenada Olympic Committee

in Nanjing
- Competitors: 4 in 2 sports
- Medals Ranked 80th: Gold 0 Silver 0 Bronze 1 Total 1

Summer Youth Olympics appearances
- 2010; 2014; 2018

Grenada competed at the 2014 Summer Youth Olympics, in Nanjing, China from 16 August to 28 August 2014.

== Medalists ==
Medal	Name	Sport	Event	Date
Bronze	Meleni Rodney	Athletics	Girls' 400 m	23 August

== Athletics ==
Grenada qualified two athletes.

Qualification Legend: Q=Final A (medal); qB=Final B (non-medal); qC=Final C (non-medal); qD=Final D (non-medal); qE=Final E (non-medal)

Boys
Field Events

Athlete	Event	Qualification		Final	
Athlete	Event	Distance	Rank	Distance	Rank
Josh Boateng	Discus throw	51.24	16 qB	50.07	15

Girls
Track & road events

Athlete	Event	Heats		Final	
Athlete	Event	Result	Rank	Result	Rank
Meleni Rodney	400 m	53.95	2 Q	53.33	3rd place, bronze medalist(s)

== Swimming ==
Grenada qualified two swimmers.

Boys

Athlete	Event	Heat		Semifinal		Final	
Athlete	Event	Time	Rank	Time	Rank	Time	Rank
Kerry Ollivierre	50 m freestyle	25.40	35	did not advance			
Kerry Ollivierre	50 m breaststroke	32.45	36	did not advance			

Girls

Athlete	Event	Heat		Semifinal		Final	
Athlete	Event	Time	Rank	Time	Rank	Time	Rank
Mia Benjamin	50 m freestyle	29.71	40	did not advance			
Mia Benjamin	200 m individual medley	2:41.36	27	—		did not advance	
