= Gymnastics at the 2014 Summer Youth Olympics – Girls' trampoline =

The girls' trampoline competition at the 2014 Summer Youth Olympics was held on 21 August 2014. The event took place in Nanjing Olympic Sport Complex Gymnasium, Nanjing, China. There are 12 contestants from 12 different NOCs competing in this event.

== Medalists ==
Gold	Silver	Bronze
Zhu Xueying; China	Rana Nakano; Japan	Maria Zakharchuk; Russia

== Qualification ==
Order	Athlete	1st routine		2nd routine		Total	
Order	Athlete	Score	Rank	Score	Rank	Score	Rank
1	Zhu Xueying (CHN)	41.855	5	54.890	1	96.845	1 Q
2	Maria Zakharchuk (RUS)	44.245	1	52.225	3	96.470	2 Q
3	Rana Nakano (JPN)	41.710	7	53.275	2	94.985	3 Q
4	Zaynub Akbar (GBR)	42.670	3	50.275	5	92.945	4 Q
5	Lea Labrousse (FRA)	41.980	4	50.660	4	92.640	5 Q
6	Abbie Watts (AUS)	42.905	2	48.630	7	91.535	6 Q
7	Nicole Ahsinger (USA)	41.785	6	47.220	10	89.005	7 Q
8	Karina Cantu Martinez (MEX)	40.330	8	48.110	8	88.440	8 Q
9	Nadeen Wehdan (QAT)	39.180	9	47.790	9	86.970	9 R
10	Teona Janjgava (GEO)	33.435	12	48.695	6	86.970	10 R
11	Jivanka Kruger (NAM)	37.370	11	43.340	11	80.710	11
12	Rashrakat Ismail (EGY)	37.475	10	39.910	12	77.385	12

Notes: Q=Qualified to Final; R=Reserve

== Final ==
Rank	Athlete	Difficulty	Execution	Flight	Penalty	Total
1st place, gold medalist(s)	Zhu Xueying (CHN)	13.500	25.500	16.245	0.000	55.425
2nd place, silver medalist(s)	Rana Nakano (JPN)	13.100	23.400	15.870	0.000	52.370
3rd place, bronze medalist(s)	Maria Zakharchuk (RUS)	11.000	24.600	16.760	0.000	52.360
4	Lea Labrousse (FRA)	12.700	23.100	15.350	0.000	51.150
5	Nicole Ahsinger (USA)	13.100	21.600	15.250	0.000	49.950
6	Abbie Watts (AUS)	13.100	20.400	15.670	0.000	49.170
7	Karina Cantu Martinez (MEX)	10.400	23.100	14.845	0.000	48.345
8	Zaynub Akbar (GBR)	9.200	21.300	14.155	0.000	44.655
