= Swimming at the 2014 Summer Youth Olympics – Girls' 200 metre individual medley =

Girls' 200 metre individual medley at the 2014 Summer Youth Olympics
- Venue: Nanjing Olympic Sports Centre
- Dates: 17 August
- Competitors: 27 from 25 nations
- Winning time: 2:12.66

Medalists
gold medal	Nguyễn Thị Ánh Viên	Vietnam
silver medal	Siobhán Haughey	Hong Kong
bronze medal	Meghan Small	United States

The girls' 200 metre individual medley event in swimming at the 2014 Summer Youth Olympics took place on 17 August at the Nanjing Olympic Sports Centre in Nanjing, China.

== Results ==
=== Heats ===
The heats were held at 11:06.

Rank	Heat	Lane	Name	Nationality	Time	Notes
1	3	4	Meghan Small	United States	2:15.24	Q
2	4	3	Marlies Ross	South Africa	2:15.45	Q
3	3	5	Kathrin Demler	Germany	2:15.50	Q
4	3	3	África Zamorano	Spain	2:15.60	Q
5	2	5	Dalma Sebestyén	Hungary	2:15.99	Q
6	4	5	Nguyễn Thị Ánh Viên	Vietnam	2:16.02	Q
7	2	4	Siobhán Haughey	Hong Kong	2:16.53	Q
8	3	6	Kelsey Wog	Canada	2:17.55	Q
9	3	2	Hannah Moore	United States	2:18.02	
10	4	1	Jimena Pérez	Spain	2:18.34	
11	4	7	Phiangkhwan Pawapotako	Thailand	2:18.98	
12	2	6	Esmee Bos	Netherlands	2:19.43	
13	2	7	Suzuna Onodera	Japan	2:19.77	
14	2	2	Ella Bond	Australia	2:20.28	
15	3	8	Georgiya Kadoglu	Bulgaria	2:20.40	
16	2	1	Bruna Primati	Brazil	2:20.41	
17	4	6	Jaqueline Hippi	Sweden	2:20.84	
18	3	7	Samantha Yeo	Singapore	2:21.96	
19	1	5	Sonja Adelaar	Namibia	2:22.54	
20	4	2	Natalia Jaspeado	Mexico	2:22.61	
21	4	8	Lisa Mamie	Switzerland	2:23.05	
22	2	8	Monique Olivier	Luxembourg	2:23.17	
23	2	3	Iryna Hlavnyk	Ukraine	2:23.61	
24	3	1	Alina Ene	Romania	2:25.75	
25	1	4	Hamida Nefsi	Algeria	2:29.20	
26	1	3	Elvira Hasanova	Azerbaijan	2:33.52	
27	1	6	Mia Benjamin	Grenada	2:41.36	
	4	4	Rūta Meilutytė	Lithuania	DNS	

=== Final ===
The final was held at 18:46.

Rank	Lane	Name	Nationality	Time	Notes
1st place, gold medalist(s)	7	Nguyễn Thị Ánh Viên	Vietnam	2:12.66	
2nd place, silver medalist(s)	1	Siobhán Haughey	Hong Kong	2:13.21	
3rd place, bronze medalist(s)	4	Meghan Small	United States	2:14.01	
4	6	África Zamorano	Spain	2:14.18	
5	3	Kathrin Demler	Germany	2:14.53	
6	2	Dalma Sebestyén	Hungary	2:14.66	
7	5	Marlies Ross	South Africa	2:15.25	
8	8	Kelsey Wog	Canada	2:17.86	
