= Athletics at the 2014 Summer Youth Olympics – Girls' 400 metres =

Athletics – Girls' 400 metres at the II Summer Youth Olympic Games
- Venue: Nanjing Olympic Sports Centre
- Date: August 20–23
- Competitors: 21 from 21 nations

Medalists
1st place, gold medalist(s)		Jessica Thornton	Australia
2nd place, silver medalist(s)		Salwa Naser	Bahrain
3rd place, bronze medalist(s)		Meleni Rodney	Grenada

The girls’ 400 m competition at the 2014 Summer Youth Olympics was held on 20–23 August 2014 in Nanjing Olympic Sports Center.

== Schedule ==
Date	Time	Round
20 August 2014	20:15	Heats
23 August 2014	20:35	Final

== Results ==
=== Heats ===
Eight fastest athletes advanced to Final A, the others advanced to Final B, or C according to their times.

Rank	Heat	Lane	Athlete	Result	Notes	Q
1	1	6	Jessica Thornton (AUS)	52.78	PB	FA
2	1	5	Meleni Rodney (GRN)	53.95	PB	FA
2	3	6	Salwa Naser (BRN)	53.95	PB	FA
4	3	5	Brittny Ellis (USA)	54.11		FA
5	1	4	Ilaria Verderio (ITA)	54.18		FA
6	2	4	Kyra Constantine (CAN)	54.24	PB	FA
7	1	8	Sada Williams (BAR)	54.26		FA
8	3	2	Iyndra-Sareena Carti (FRA)	54.42		FA
9	2	6	Tiffany James (JAM)	54.54		FB
10	2	7	Yana Kachur (UKR)	54.97		FB
11	2	5	Shaquania Dorsett (BAH)	55.74		FB
12	3	8	Zion Corrales-Nelson (PHI)	56.22	PB	FB
13	1	3	Lyubov Ushakova (KAZ)	56.30	PB	FB
14	2	8	María Simancas (VEN)	56.63		FB
15	3	7	Astrid Balanta (COL)	57.23		FB
16	3	4	Mariette Agbety (BEN)	58.74		FC
17	2	2	Paula de Brito (CPV)	58.85	PB	FC
18	2	3	Albenzinia soares (STP)	1:00.60	PB	FC
19	1	2	Margret Hassan (IOA)	1:04.48		FC
20	1	7	Hannah May Jamal Hasim (BRU)	1:04.88	PB	FC
	3	3	Eve Burns (MHL)	DNF		FC

=== Finals ===
==== Final A ====
Rank	Final Placing	Lane	Athlete	Result	Notes
1st place, gold medalist(s)	1	4	Jessica Thornton (AUS)	52.50	PB
2nd place, silver medalist(s)	2	5	Salwa Naser (BRN)	52.74	PB
3rd place, bronze medalist(s)	3	6	Meleni Rodney (GRN)	53.33	PB
4	4	2	Iyndra-Sareena Carti (FRA)	53.54	PB
5	5	8	Kyra Constantine (CAN)	53.70	PB
6	6	7	Brittny Ellis (USA)	53.82	
7	7	9	Ilaria Verderio (ITA)	54.43	
8	8	3	Sada Williams (BAR)	54.93	

==== Final B ====
Rank	Final Placing	Lane	Athlete	Result	Notes
1	9	5	Yana Kachur (UKR)	54.48	
2	10	4	Tiffany James (JAM)	54.54	
3	11	8	María Simancas (VEN)	54.92	
4	12	7	Zion Corrales-Nelson (PHI)	55.32	PB
5	13	9	Lyubov Ushakova (KAZ)	55.43	PB
6	14	6	Shaquania Dorsett (BAH)	55.52	
7	15	3	Astrid Balanta (COL)	55.90	

==== Final C ====
Rank	Final Placing	Lane	Athlete	Result	Notes
1	16	4	Paula de Brito (CPV)	57.91	PB
2	17	5	Mariette Agbety (BEN)	58.74	PB
3	18	6	Albenzinia soares (STP)	1:00.96	
4	19	7	Margret Hassan (IOA)	1:01.72	
5	20	8	Hannah May Jamal Hasim (BRU)	1:03.98	PB
		3	Eve Burns (MHL)	DNS	
