= Togo at the 2014 Summer Youth Olympics =

- IOC code: TOG
- NOC: Comité National Olympique Togolais

in Nanjing
- Competitors: 3 in 3 sports
- Medals: Gold 0 Silver 0 Bronze 0 Total 0

Summer Youth Olympics appearances
- 2010; 2014; 2018

Togo competed at the 2014 Summer Youth Olympics, in Nanjing, China from 16 August to 28 August 2014.

== Fencing ==
Togo was given a quota to compete by the tripartite committee.

Girls

| Athlete | Event | Pool Round | Seed | Round of 16 | Quarterfinals | Semifinals | Final / BM | Rank |
| Athlete | Event | Opposition Score | Seed | Opposition Score | Opposition Score | Opposition Score | Opposition Score | Rank |
|---|---|---|---|---|---|---|---|---|
| Abla Koutogle | Sabre | M Emura (JPN); L 1 – 5 N Ciss (SEN); W 5 – 4 T Gkountoura (GRE); L 2 – 5 F Kose (TUR); L 0 – 5 A Moseyko (RUS); L 2 – 5 S Matuszak (POL); L 0 – 5 | 12 | M Emura (JPN); L 7 – 15 | did not advance | | | 12 |

== Rowing ==
Togo was given a boat to compete by the tripartite committee.

| Athlete | Event | Heats | | Repechage | | Semifinals | | Final | |
| Athlete | Event | Time | Rank | Time | Rank | Time | Rank | Time | Rank |
|---|---|---|---|---|---|---|---|---|---|
| Akossiwa Ayivon | Girls' Single Sculls | 4:32.16 | 5 R | 4:38.85 | 5 SC/D | 4:38.99 | 6 FD | 4:39.45 | 23 |

Qualification Legend: FA=Final A (medal); FB=Final B (non-medal); FC=Final C (non-medal); FD=Final D (non-medal); SA/B=Semifinals A/B; SC/D=Semifinals C/D; R=Repechage

== Table Tennis ==
Togo was given a quota to compete by the tripartite committee.

Singles

| Athlete | Event | Group Stage | Rank | Round of 16 | Quarterfinals | Semifinals | Final / BM | Rank |
| Athlete | Event | Opposition Score | Rank | Opposition Score | Opposition Score | Opposition Score | Opposition Score | Rank |
|---|---|---|---|---|---|---|---|---|
| Soudes Alassani | Boys | Group D P Tanviriyavechakul (THA); L 0 – 3 | 4 qB | A Yadav (IND); L 0 – 3 | did not advance | | | 25 |
| Soudes Alassani | Boys | J Yin (SIN); L 0 – 3 | 4 qB | A Yadav (IND); L 0 – 3 | did not advance | | | 25 |
| Soudes Alassani | Boys | H Yang (TPE); L 0 – 3 | 4 qB | A Yadav (IND); L 0 – 3 | did not advance | | | 25 |

Team

| Athletes | Event | Group Stage | Rank | Round of 16 | Quarterfinals | Semifinals | Final / BM | Rank |
| Athletes | Event | Opposition Score | Rank | Opposition Score | Opposition Score | Opposition Score | Opposition Score | Rank |
|---|---|---|---|---|---|---|---|---|
| Africa 3 Fatouma Ali Salah (DJI); Soudes Alassani (TOG) | Mixed | Intercontinental 1 A Luo (CAN); B Afanador (PUR); L 0 – 3 | 4 qB | Austria; K Mischek (AUT); A Levenko (AUT); L 0 – 3 | did not advance | | | 25 |
| Africa 3 Fatouma Ali Salah (DJI); Soudes Alassani (TOG) | Mixed | India; S Mukherjee (IND); A Yadav (IND); L 0 – 3 | 4 qB | Austria; K Mischek (AUT); A Levenko (AUT); L 0 – 3 | did not advance | | | 25 |
| Africa 3 Fatouma Ali Salah (DJI); Soudes Alassani (TOG) | Mixed | Japan; M Kato (JPN); Y Muramatsu (JPN); L 0 – 3 | 4 qB | Austria; K Mischek (AUT); A Levenko (AUT); L 0 – 3 | did not advance | | | 25 |

Qualification Legend: Q=Main Bracket (medal); qB=Consolation Bracket (non-medal)

== See also ==
- Togo at the 2014 Winter Olympics
