= Athletics at the 2014 Summer Youth Olympics – Girls' javelin throw =

Athletics – Girls' javelin throw at the II Summer Youth Olympic Games
- Venue: Nanjing Olympic Sports Centre
- Date: August 22–25
- Competitors: 18 from 18 nations

Medalists
| 1st place, gold medalist(s) | | Hanna Tarasiuk | Belarus |
| 2nd place, silver medalist(s) | | Fabienne Schönig | Germany |
| 3rd place, bronze medalist(s) | | Nagisa Mori | Japan |

The girls’ javelin throw competition at the 2014 Summer Youth Olympics was held on 22–25 August 2014 in Nanjing Olympic Sports Center.

== Schedule ==
| Date | Time | Round |
|---|---|---|
| 22 August 2014 | 18:35 | Qualification |
| 25 August 2014 | 20:05 | Final |

== Results ==
=== Qualification ===
First 50% of the athletes from the Qualification round progress to the A Final and the remaining athletes to the B Final.

| Rank | Athlete | 1 | 2 | 3 | 4 | Result | Notes | Q |
|---|---|---|---|---|---|---|---|---|
| 1 | Hanna Tarasiuk (BLR) | 55.48 | 53.62 | - | - | 55.48 | | FA |
| 2 | Fabienne Schönig (GER) | 52.83 | 50.48 | x | - | 52.83 | | FA |
| 3 | Jo-Ane van Dyk (RSA) | 52.60 | 51.73 | 50.45 | x | 52.60 | PB | FA |
| 4 | Aleksandra Ostrowska (POL) | 52.21 | 50.10 | 49.46 | 52.14 | 52.21 | | FA |
| 5 | Nagisa Mori (JPN) | 47.56 | 40.97 | 50.72 | 50.68 | 50.72 | PB | FA |
| 6 | Pushpa Jakhar (IND) | 40.07 | 50.21 | 44.45 | 44.30 | 50.21 | PB | FA |
| 7 | Tjaša Stanko (SLO) | 47.98 | 44.11 | 48.21 | 50.14 | 50.14 | | FA |
| 8 | Laine Donane (LAT) | 48.94 | 48.06 | 46.96 | x | 48.94 | | FA |
| 9 | Alexandra Maria da Silva (BRA) | 48.28 | x | x | 46.62 | 48.28 | | FA |
| 10 | Eda Tuğsuz (TUR) | 47.75 | x | x | x | 47.75 | | FB |
| 11 | Atina Kamasi (SRB) | 44.58 | 46.66 | x | 47.21 | 47.21 | | FB |
| 12 | Emma Fitzgerald (USA) | 40.07 | 38.83 | 46.64 | x | 46.64 | | FB |
| 13 | Brittni Wolczyk (CAN) | 46.43 | 44.76 | x | x | 46.43 | | FB |
| 14 | Varvara Nazarova (KAZ) | x | 38.52 | 41.88 | 44.65 | 44.65 | | FB |
| 15 | Shanee Angol (DMA) | 37.27 | 34.72 | 39.82 | 43.25 | 43.25 | | FB |
| 16 | Kenifing Traoré (MLI) | 39.03 | 32.88 | 42.89 | 39.33 | 42.89 | PB | FB |
| 17 | Araceli Llanes (PAR) | 32.77 | 39.65 | x | 31.26 | 39.65 | | FB |
| 18 | Rochelle Etienne (LCA) | 30.62 | 25.20 | 29.35 | 34.40 | 34.40 | | FB |

=== Finals ===
==== Final A ====
| Rank | Final Placing | Athlete | 1 | 2 | 3 | 4 | Result | Notes |
|---|---|---|---|---|---|---|---|---|
| 1st place, gold medalist(s) | 1 | Hanna Tarasiuk (BLR) | 55.70 | x | 50.10 | 59.52 | 59.52 | PB |
| 2nd place, silver medalist(s) | 2 | Fabienne Schönig (GER) | 51.51 | 53.68 | x | 53.24 | 53.68 | |
| 3rd place, bronze medalist(s) | 3 | Nagisa Mori (JPN) | 52.27 | 44.36 | 46.34 | 46.79 | 52.27 | PB |
| 4 | 4 | Laine Donane (LAT) | 41.89 | 51.90 | 46.18 | 51.42 | 51.90 | |
| 5 | 5 | Aleksandra Ostrowska (POL) | 47.32 | 41.77 | 44.96 | 51.79 | 51.79 | |
| 6 | 6 | Pushpa Jakhar (IND) | 39.31 | 44.23 | 43.42 | 49.56 | 49.56 | |
| 7 | 7 | Jo-Ane van Dyk (RSA) | 43.50 | 48.93 | x | 43.18 | 48.93 | |
| 8 | 8 | Alexandra Maria da Silva (BRA) | 45.31 | 47.54 | x | 45.76 | 47.54 | |
| 9 | 9 | Tjaša Stanko (SLO) | 46.80 | 46.26 | 47.21 | 45.68 | 47.21 | |

==== Final B ====
| Rank | Final Placing | Athlete | 1 | 2 | 3 | 4 | Result | Notes |
|---|---|---|---|---|---|---|---|---|
| 1 | 10 | Atina Kamasi (SRB) | 41.85 | 49.63 | 45.72 | 47.50 | 49.63 | |
| 2 | 11 | Brittni Wolczyk (CAN) | 43.87 | 48.85 | 44.75 | 43.39 | 48.85 | PB |
| 3 | 12 | Eda Tuğsuz (TUR) | x | 48.48 | x | x | 48.48 | |
| 4 | 13 | Varvara Nazarova (KAZ) | 39.78 | 45.89 | 41.63 | 46.20 | 46.20 | |
| 5 | 14 | Emma Fitzgerald (USA) | 43.43 | x | x | 35.39 | 43.43 | |
| 6 | 15 | Araceli Llanes (PAR) | 40.51 | 39.41 | 39.19 | 42.19 | 42.19 | |
| 7 | 16 | Kenifing Traoré (MLI) | 41.88 | 39.02 | 32.33 | x | 41.88 | |
| 8 | 17 | Rochelle Etienne (LCA) | 35.20 | 33.14 | 37.41 | 35.46 | 37.41 | PB |
| | | Shanee Angol (DMA) | | | | | DNS | |
