= Swimming at the 2014 Summer Youth Olympics – Boys' 50 metre backstroke =

Boys' 50 metre backstroke at the 2014 Summer Youth Olympics
- Venue: Nanjing Olympic Sports Centre
- Dates: 19 August (heats, semifinals); 20 August (final)
- Competitors: 27 from 26 nations
- Winning time: 25.09

Medalists
gold medal	Evgeny Rylov	Russia
silver medal	Apostolos Christou	Greece
bronze medal	Simone Sabbioni	Italy

The boys' 50 metre backstroke event in swimming at the 2014 Summer Youth Olympics took place on 19 and 20 August at the Nanjing Olympic Sports Centre in Nanjing, China.

== Results ==
=== Heats ===
The heats were held at 10:07.

Rank	Heat	Lane	Name	Nationality	Time	Notes
1	2	6	Robert Glință	Romania	25.63	Q
2	2	3	Evgeny Rylov	Russia	25.66	Q
3	4	4	Simone Sabbioni	Italy	25.90	Q
4	3	4	Apostolos Christou	Greece	25.96	Q
5	2	4	Jānis Šaltāns	Latvia	26.03	Q
6	4	2	Vitor Guaraldo	Brazil	26.13	Q
7	2	5	Filipp Shopin	Russia	26.20	Q
8	3	5	Laurent Bams	Netherlands	26.21	Q
9	3	6	Robinson Molina	Venezuela	26.22	Q
10	4	5	Marek Ulrich	Germany	26.28	Q
11	4	8	Karl Luht	Estonia	26.46	Q
12	4	3	Andriy Khloptsov	Ukraine	26.53	Q
13	3	3	Armin Porobic	Norway	26.60	Q
14	2	2	Christopher Reid	South Africa	26.71	Q
15	3	2	Petter Fredriksson	Sweden	26.72	Q
16	4	1	Trần Duy Khôi	Vietnam	26.73	Q
17	4	6	David McLeod	Trinidad and Tobago	26.78	
18	4	7	Lau Shiu Yue	Hong Kong	26.79	
19	1	4	Žan Pogačar	Slovenia	26.85	
20	1	3	Patrick Mulcare	United States	26.86	
21	3	8	Danail Slavchev	Bulgaria	26.87	
22	3	1	Kristinn Þórarinsson	Iceland	27.05	
23	2	1	Ricky Anggawidjaja	Indonesia	27.07	
24	2	7	Berk Özkul	Turkey	27.29	
25	1	5	Matthew Mac	Canada	27.59	
26	3	7	Timothy Wynter	Jamaica	27.61	
27	1	6	Davide Bernardi	San Marino	28.19	
	2	8	Chad Idensohn	Zimbabwe	DNS	

=== Semifinals ===
The semifinals were held at 19:00.

Rank	Heat	Lane	Name	Nationality	Time	Notes
1	2	5	Simone Sabbioni	Italy	25.40	Q
2	1	4	Evgeny Rylov	Russia	25.42	Q
3	1	5	Apostolos Christou	Greece	25.63	Q
4	1	3	Vitor Guaraldo	Brazil	25.79	Q
4	2	6	Filipp Shopin	Russia	25.79	Q
6	1	6	Laurent Bams	Netherlands	25.84	Q
7	1	7	Andrii Khloptsov	Ukraine	25.95	Q
8	2	4	Robert Glință	Romania	25.98	Q
9	2	3	Jānis Šaltāns	Latvia	26.06	
10	1	2	Marek Ulrich	Germany	26.13	
11	2	1	Armin Porobic	Norway	26.26	
12	2	2	Robinson Molina	Venezuela	26.35	
13	2	8	Petter Fredriksson	Sweden	26.36	
14	2	7	Karl Luht	Estonia	26.49	
15	1	8	Trần Duy Khôi	Vietnam	26.71	
16	1	1	Christopher Reid	South Africa	26.75	

=== Final ===
The final was held at 18:00.

Rank	Lane	Name	Nationality	Time	Notes
1st place, gold medalist(s)	5	Evgeny Rylov	Russia	25.09	WJR
2nd place, silver medalist(s)	3	Apostolos Christou	Greece	25.44	
3rd place, bronze medalist(s)	4	Simone Sabbioni	Italy	25.47	
4	7	Laurent Bams	Netherlands	25.61	
5	2	Filipp Shopin	Russia	25.83	
6	6	Vitor Guaraldo	Brazil	25.85	
7	8	Robert Glință	Romania	25.96	
8	1	Andriy Khloptsov	Ukraine	26.10	
