= Minami Kubono =

Japanese triathlete

Minami Kubono (久保埜 南 Kubono Minami, born 19 August 1997 in Chitose, Hokkaido) is a Japanese triathlete.

Influenced by her father Masahiro and her two older brothers Kazuki and Yūki, who were also triathletes, Minami Kubono took up triathlon in her third year of elementary school. In 2011, at the age of 14, she became the Japanese national U15 triathlon champion, finishing the super-sprint distance of 375m swimming, 10 km cycling and 2.5 km running at Nagaragawa Triathlon in 36:39 minutes – only three seconds before Hitomi Amami, who would later also become a professional triathlete. At that time, Kubono was also a track-and-field athlete and represented her home prefecture Hokkaido at the prestigious Empress's Cup road running relay race in 2012.

After graduating from junior high school, Kubono moved to Kōfu in Yamanashi Prefecture, where she eventually graduated from high school. In Yamanashi she was able to improve her cycling thanks to a terrain with many inclines, and she benefited from training with more experienced, successful triathletes Mariko Adachi and Yuka Sato.

In the following years, Kubono successfully participated in triathlon events in the Youth segment. She took 3rd place in the Japanese Junior National Championships in both 2013 and 2014, and finished 7th in the Junior category of the 2013 ASTC Asian Championships in Subic Bay, Philippines. In 2013, Kubono came in 2nd at the Junior Asian Championships in Burabay, Kazakhstan, and thus qualified for the 2014 Summer Youth Olympics in Nanjing, China.

At the 2014 Youth Olympic Games, Kubono participated in both the individual race and the mixed relay (in an Asian team together with Michael Lam from Hong Kong, and Kim Gyuri and Lee Gyuhyung from South Korea), finishing 5th in the former event and 8th in the latter. After Nanjing, she successfully participated in many more races at the Youth level, including the 2015 Japanese Junior National Championships (2nd place), the 2016 Asian Championships in Hatsukaichi, Hiroshima Prefecture, Japan (2nd place), and the 2016 Japanese Junior National Championships which she won. In 2019, when she had already done a number of Elite races, she participated in the U23 category of the ASTC Triathlon Asian Championships in Gyeongju, South Korea, where she took 3rd place – 27 seconds behind Fūka Sega whom she had beaten eight years prior in the Nagaragawa triathlon.

From 2015 onward, Kubono also took part in short-distance triathlon races in the Elite segment, but was less successful there. At the 2016 Asian Championships she came in 2nd in the mixed relay (together with Ryousuke Maeda, Hiraku Fukuoka and Shiruba Taniguchi), 4th in the 2017 Japanese National Championships, 4th in the 2019 ASTC Sprint Triathlon Asian Cup and Central Asian Championships in Cholpon-Ata, and 5th in the 2021 Japanese National Championships. Recently, however, Kubono won the 2022 Sado International Triathlon in the ‘B-Race’ (a distance between long and middle distance).

Since 2022, Kubono has been working as a triathlon coach.
