= Abhishek Yadav (table tennis) =

Indian table tennis player (born 1996)

Personal information
- Born: Abhishek Yadav; 9 July 1996 (age 30) Kanpur, Uttar Pradesh

Sport
- Country: India
- Sport: Badminton
- Coached by: Avinash Kumar Yadav & Yin Wei
- Event: Men's Singles

Abhishek Yadav (born 9 July 1996) is an Indian Table Tennis player. He trains at the Petroleum Sports Promotion Board Academy in Ajmer, Rajasthan, Delhi. Abhishek has been sponsored by Stag International since 2005. After graduating Abhishek's talent was spotted by the GoSports Foundation, Bangalore and was part of their scholarship programme from 2012 to 2014. Abhishek did his schooling from Guru Har Rai Academy, Kanpur.

== Career ==
=== 2010 ===
- Abhishek won bronze medal in Cadet Boys Doubles and Cadet Boys Team event at Nikon Hongkong Junior and Cadet Open held at Hongkong from 4–8 August 2010

=== 2012 ===
- Abhishek won the singles, doubles and team event in the U-18 category at the 2012 South Asian Championships in Shillong.

=== 2013 ===
- In 2013, Abhishek won the bronze medal at the Asian Youth Games in Nanjing, China losing to then world junior no 1 and top seed Fan Zhendong in the semis. He followed that up by winning the junior national table tennis championship in Guwahati, Assam.
- Won Gold medal in Junior boys doubles and silver medal in Junior boys Team event at ITTF Global Junior Circuit Sloval Junior Open held in May-Jun 2013 at Slovek Senek, Slovakia.

=== 2014 ===
- Abhishek participated in the men's singles and mixed international event at the 2014 Summer Youth Olympics in Nanjing, China. He reached the final of the consolation round in singles and the consolation round semis in the mixed team discipline.

=== 2015 ===
- Bronze Medal in Men's doubles in Commonwealth Championship held at Surat, Gujrat
- Participated for India in ITTF World Tour Austrian Open held at Wels, Austria from 2–6 September 2015 and ITTF World Tour Belgium Open held at De Haan Belgium from 8–12 September 2015
- Abhishek won the gold medal at the Senior National in men's doubles at Hyderabad. He also went on to win the bronze medal in men's doubles at the Commonwealth Championship in Surat.

=== 2018 ===
- Bronze Medal in Men's doubles in Challenge Master Nigeria open held at Lagos, Nigeria in 2018

== Personal ==
Abhishek hails from a modest family in Kanpur, Uttar Pradesh. His father runs a small bookstall and is the sole earning member in a family of five. Abhishek was introduced to the game by his elder brother and sister. After demonstrating exceptional natural skill and ability at a young age, his first coach, Late Ms. Indu Mandra, convinced his father to allow him to take up the sport seriously.

Abhishek's talent was spotted by the GoSports Foundation, Bangalore in 2012, and after tracking his performance over the year, he was part of GoSports Foundation's Athlete Scholarship programme. Abhishek plans to participate in a number of international events in the 2016–17 season.
