= Tennis at the 2014 Summer Youth Olympics =

- Date: 17–24 August
- Edition: 2nd
- Category: Grade A
- Location: Nanjing Sport Institute

Champions

Mixed doubles
- Jil Teichmann / Jan Zieliński (MIX)

Boys' singles
- Kamil Majchrzak (POL)

Girls' singles
- Xu Shilin (CHN)

Boys' doubles
- Orlando Luz / Marcelo Zormann (BRA)

Girls' doubles
- Anhelina Kalinina / Iryna Shymanovich (MIX)
- Summer Youth Olympics

Tennis at the 2014 Summer Youth Olympics was held from 17 to 24 August at the Nanjing Sport Institute in Nanjing, China.

== Qualification ==
Each National Olympic Committee (NOC) can enter a maximum of 4 competitors, 2 per each gender. As hosts, China is given 2 quotas, 1 per each gender should they not qualify normally, however they normally qualified two female athletes and chose not to use their male quota and a further 6 competitors, 3 per each gender will be decided by the Tripartite Commission. Only four of those spots were used, the other two were reallocated to the World Junior rankings. The remaining 56 places shall be decided by the ATP rankings, WTA rankings and ITF World Junior rankings update on 9 June 2014. The first 12 spots per each gender will go to any eligible athlete ranked in the top 450 in the ATP rankings for boys and the top 200 in the WTA rankings for girls. Should any spots remain they will be reallocated to the top ranked athletes in the ITF World Junior rankings. The remaining 16 spots per each gender will be broken down into zones and given to the next best ranked athlete in the ITF World Junior rankings.

To be eligible to participate at the Youth Olympics athletes must have been born between 1 January 1996 and 31 December 1999. Furthermore, all qualified players will take place in the doubles and mixed doubles events.

=== Boys ===
Event	Breakdown	Date	Total places	Qualified
Host nation	-	-	0	
ATP rankings	Top 450	9 June 2014	1	Karen Khachanov (RUS)
ITF World Junior rankings	Top Athletes	9 June 2014	13	Matías Zukas (ARG); Clément Geens (BEL); Orlando Luz (BRA); Marcelo Zormann (BRA); Nino Serdarušić (CRO); Petros Chrysochos (CYP); Jumpei Yamasaki (JPN); Lee Duck-hee (KOR); Nicolás Álvarez (PER); Kamil Majchrzak (POL); Jan Zieliński (POL); Andrey Rublev (RUS); Alex Rybakov (USA)
ITF World Junior rankings	Africa	9 June 2014	2	Guy Orly Iradukunda (BDI); Lloyd Harris (RSA)
ITF World Junior rankings	Asia/Oceania	9 June 2014	4	Harry Bourchier (AUS); Marc Polmans (AUS); Ryotaro Matsumura (JPN); Chung Yun-seong (KOR)
ITF World Junior rankings	Europe	9 June 2014	5	André Biró (HUN); Petar Čonkić (SRB); Martin Blaško (SVK); Alex Molčan (SVK); Daniel Appelgren (SWE)
ITF World Junior rankings	North/Central America & Caribbean	9 June 2014	2	Justin Roberts (BAH); Rasheed Carey (BAH)
ITF World Junior rankings	South America	9 June 2014	3	Francisco Bahamonde (ARG); Luis Valero (COL); Juan José Rosas (PER)
Tripartite Invitation	-	-	2	Pavle Rogan (MNE); Sharmal Dissanayake (SRI)
Total			32	

=== Girls ===
Event	Breakdown	Date	Total places	Qualified
Host nation	-	-	1	Ye Qiuyu (CHN)
WTA rankings	Top 200	9 June 2014	0	
ITF World Junior rankings	Top Athletes	9 June 2014	14	Priscilla Hon (AUS); Iryna Shymanovich (BLR); Xu Shilin (CHN); Markéta Vondroušová (CZE); Sandra Samir (EGY); Anna Bondár (HUN); Ioana Loredana Roșca (ROU); Ioana Ducu (ROU); Darya Kasatkina (RUS); Anastasiya Komardina (RUS); Ivana Jorović (SRB); Viktória Kužmová (SVK); Kristína Schmiedlová (SVK); Jil Belen Teichmann (SUI)
ITF World Junior rankings	Africa	9 June 2014	0	
ITF World Junior rankings	Asia/Oceania	9 June 2014	4	Naiktha Bains (AUS); Ojasvinee Singh (IND); Kim Da-bin (KOR); Kamonwan Buayam (THA)
ITF World Junior rankings	Europe	9 June 2014	6	Greetje Minnen (BEL); Simona Heinová (CZE); Fanny Stollár (HUN); Jeļena Ostapenko (LAT); Akvilė Paražinskaitė (LTU); Anhelina Kalinina (UKR)
ITF World Junior rankings	North/Central America & Caribbean	9 June 2014	2	Renata Zarazúa (MEX); Sofia Kenin (USA)
ITF World Junior rankings	South America	9 June 2014	3	Luisa Stefani (BRA); María Herazo González (COL); Doménica González (ECU)
Tripartite Invitation	-	-	2	Lesedi Sheya Jacobs (NAM); Camila Giangreco Campiz (PAR)
Total			32	

== Schedule ==
The schedule was released by the Nanjing Youth Olympic Games Organizing Committee.

All times are CST (UTC+8)

Event date	Event day	Starting time	Event details
17 August	Sunday	15:00	Boys' singles: 1st round Girls' doubles: 1st round
18 August	Monday	15:00	Girls' singles: 1st round Boys' doubles: 1st round
19 August	Tuesday	15:00	Boys' singles: 2nd round Girls' doubles: quarterfinals Mixed doubles: 1st round
20 August	Wednesday	15:00	Boys' singles: quarterfinals Girls' singles: 2nd round Boys' doubles: quarterfinals Girls' doubles: semifinals
21 August	Thursday	15:00	Boys' singles: semifinals Girls' singles: quarterfinals Mixed doubles: 2nd round
22 August	Friday	15:00	Boys' singles: bronze medal match Girls' singles: semifinals Boys' doubles: semifinals Girls' doubles: bronze medal match Mixed doubles: quarterfinals
23 August	Saturday	15:00	Boys' singles: gold medal match Girls' singles: bronze medal match Boys' doubles: bronze medal match Girls' doubles: gold medal match Mixed doubles: semifinals
24 August	Sunday	15:00	Girls' singles: gold medal match Boys' doubles: gold medal match Mixed doubles: bronze medal match Mixed doubles: gold medal match

== Medal summary ==
=== Medal table ===
* Host nation (China)

Rank	Nation	Gold	Silver	Bronze	Total
1	Mixed-NOCs	2	1	2	5
2	Brazil	1	1	0	2
3	China*	1	0	0	1
3	Poland	1	0	0	1
5	Russia	0	2	1	3
6	Belarus	0	1	0	1
7	Japan	0	0	1	1
7	Lithuania	0	0	1	1
Totals (8 entries)		5	5	5	15

- Note: Medals for mixed teams have not been counted towards their individual nation.

=== Events ===
Event	Gold	Silver	Bronze
Boys' singles	Kamil Majchrzak; Poland	Orlando Luz; Brazil	Andrey Rublev; Russia
Boys' doubles	Orlando Luz; Brazil; Marcelo Zormann; Brazil	Karen Khachanov; Russia; Andrey Rublev; Russia	Ryotaro Matsumura; Japan; Jumpei Yamasaki; Japan
Girls' singles	Xu Shilin; China	Iryna Shymanovich; Belarus	Akvilė Paražinskaitė; Lithuania
Girls' doubles	Anhelina Kalinina; Ukraine; Iryna Shymanovich; Belarus	Darya Kasatkina; Russia; Anastasiya Komardina; Russia	Jeļena Ostapenko; Latvia; Akvilė Paražinskaitė; Lithuania
Mixed doubles	Jil Teichmann; Switzerland; Jan Zieliński; Poland	Ye Qiuyu; China; Jumpei Yamasaki; Japan	Fanny Stollár; Hungary; Kamil Majchrzak; Poland
