= Tennis at the 2014 Summer Youth Olympics – Mixed doubles =

Mixed doubles
- Tennis at the 2014 Summer Youth Olympics

Events
Singles	boys	girls
Doubles	boys	girls	mixed
← 2010 ·	Summer Youth Olympics	· 2018 →

These are the results for the mixed doubles event at the 2014 Summer Youth Olympics.

Jil Teichmann of Switzerland and Jan Zieliński of Poland won the gold medal, defeating Ye Qiuyu of China and Jumpei Yamasaki of Japan in the final, 4–6, 6–3, [10–5].

Fanni Stollár of Hungary and Kamil Majchrzak of Poland won the bronze medal, defeating Ioana Ducu of Romania and Matías Zukas of Argentina in the bronze-medal match, 6–3, 3–6, [10–5].

== Seeds ==
1. Darya Kasatkina (RUS) / Andrey Rublev (RUS) (second round)
2. Anastasiya Komardina (RUS) / Karen Khachanov (RUS) (quarterfinals)
3. Iryna Shymanovich (BLR) / Petros Chrysochos (CYP) (first round)
4. Markéta Vondroušová (CZE) / Nicolás Álvarez (PER) (first round)
5. Jil Teichmann (SUI) / Jan Zieliński (POL) (gold medallists)
6. Ioana Loredana Roșca (ROU) / Francisco Bahamonde (ARG) (second round, withdrew)
7. Fanni Stollár (HUN) / Kamil Majchrzak (POL) (semifinals, bronze medallists)
8. Luisa Stefani (BRA) / Orlando Luz (BRA) (quarterfinals)

== Main draw ==
=== Key ===
- Q = Qualifier
- WC = Wild card
- LL = Lucky loser
- Alt = Alternate
- ITF = ITF entry
- PR = Protected ranking
- SR = Special ranking
- SE = Special exempt
- JE = Junior exempt
- JR = Junior Accelerator Programme entrant
- CO = College Accelerator Programme entrant
- NG = Next Gen Accelerator Program entrant
- w/o = Walkover
- r = Retired
- d = Defaulted

=== Finals ===
Semifinals
Ye Qiuyu (CHN); Jumpei Yamasaki (JPN)	7^{7}	6
7	Fanni Stollár (HUN); Kamil Majchrzak (POL)	6^{5}	4
5	Jil Teichmann (SUI); Jan Zieliński (POL)	6	6
Ioana Ducu (ROU); Matías Zukas (ARG)	2	1

Gold medal match
Ye Qiuyu (CHN); Jumpei Yamasaki (JPN)	6	3	[4]
5	Jil Teichmann (SUI); Jan Zieliński (POL)	4	6	[10]
Bronze-medal match
7	Fanni Stollár (HUN); Kamil Majchrzak (POL)	6	3	[10]
Ioana Ducu (ROU); Matías Zukas (ARG)	3	6	[5]

=== Top half ===
First round
1	D Kasatkina (RUS); A Rublev (RUS)	6	6
K Schmiedlová (SVK); A Molčan (SVK)	2	4
S Xu (CHN); R Matsumura (JPN)	1	1
Q Ye (CHN); J Yamasaki (JPN)	6	6
O Singh (IND); S Dissanayake (SRI)	2	6	[9]
S Kenin (USA); A Rybakov (USA)	6	4	[11]
K Buayam (THA); Y-s Chung (KOR)	2	2
8	L Stefani (BRA); O Luz (BRA)	6	6
4	M Vondroušová (CZE); N Álvarez (PER)	5	5
C Giangreco Campiz (PAR); M Zormann (BRA)	7	7
S Samir (EGY); L Harris (RSA)	6	6
A Kalinina (UKR); P Rogan (MNE)	2	4
I Jorović (SRB); P Čonkić (SRB)	1	6	[5]
J Ostapenko (LAT); D Appelgren (SWE)	6	2	[10]
N Bains (AUS); M Polmans (AUS)	6	3	[9]
7	F Stollár (HUN); K Majchrzak (POL)	4	6	[11]

Second round
1	D Kasatkina (RUS); A Rublev (RUS)	5	6	[3]
Q Ye (CHN); J Yamasaki (JPN)	7	4	[10]
S Kenin (USA); A Rybakov (USA)	4	4
8	L Stefani (BRA); O Luz (BRA)	6	6
C Giangreco Campiz (PAR); M Zormann (BRA)	5	6	[10]
S Samir (EGY); L Harris (RSA)	7	3	[5]
J Ostapenko (LAT); D Appelgren (SWE)	2	6	[6]
7	F Stollár (HUN); K Majchrzak (POL)	6	0	[10]

Quarterfinals
Q Ye (CHN); J Yamasaki (JPN)	6	3	[10]
8	L Stefani (BRA); O Luz (BRA)	1	6	[6]
C Giangreco Campiz (PAR); M Zormann (BRA)	5	2
7	F Stollár (HUN); K Majchrzak (POL)	7	6

Semifinals
Q Ye (CHN); J Yamasaki (JPN)	7^{7}	6
7	F Stollár (HUN); K Majchrzak (POL)	6^{5}	4

=== Bottom half ===
First round
5	J Teichmann (SUI); J Zieliński (POL)	6	6
P Hon (AUS); H Bourchier (AUS)	3	4
A Paražinskaitė (LTU); N Serdarušić (CRO)	6	3	[4]
G Minnen (BEL); C Geens (BEL)	3	6	[10]
MF Herazo (COL); L Valero (COL)	3	2
S Heinová (CZE); R Carey (BAH)	6	6
D Kim (KOR); D-h Lee (KOR)	3	6	[13]
3	I Shymanovich (BLR); P Chrysochos (CYP)	6	4	[11]
6	IL Roșca (ROU); F Bahamonde (ARG)	7^{7}	6
A Bondár (HUN); A Biró (HUN)	6^{4}	3
I Ducu (ROU); M Zukas (ARG)	6	6
LS Jacobs (NAM); GO Iradukunda (BDI)	3	1
D González (ECU); JJ Rosas (PER)	5	2
V Kužmová (SVK); M Blaško (SVK)	7	6
R Zarazúa (MEX); J Roberts (BAH)	4	2
2	A Komardina (RUS); K Khachanov (RUS)	6	6

Second round
5	J Teichmann (SUI); J Zieliński (POL)	7^{9}	6
G Minnen (BEL); C Geens (BEL)	6^{7}	3
S Heinová (CZE); R Carey (BAH)	w/o
D Kim (KOR); D-h Lee (KOR)
6	IL Roșca (ROU); F Bahamonde (ARG)
I Ducu (ROU); M Zukas (ARG)	w/o
V Kužmová (SVK); M Blaško (SVK)	3	1
2	A Komardina (RUS); K Khachanov (RUS)	6	6

Quarterfinals
5	J Teichmann (SUI); J Zieliński (POL)	6	6
S Heinová (CZE); R Carey (BAH)	3	3
I Ducu (ROU); M Zukas (ARG)	7^{7}	6
2	A Komardina (RUS); K Khachanov (RUS)	6^{2}	4

Semifinals
5	J Teichmann (SUI); J Zieliński (POL)	6	6
I Ducu (ROU); M Zukas (ARG)	2	1
