= Tennis at the 2014 Summer Youth Olympics – Girls' singles =

Girls' singles
- Tennis at the 2014 Summer Youth Olympics

Events
Singles	boys	girls
Doubles	boys	girls	mixed
- Summer Youth Olympics

These are the results for the girls' singles event at the 2014 Summer Youth Olympics.

Xu Shilin of China won the gold medal, defeating Iryna Shymanovich of Belarus in the final, 6–3, 6–1.

Akvilė Paražinskaitė of Lithuania won the bronze medal, defeating Anhelina Kalinina of Ukraine in the bronze medal match, 6–3, 7–5.

== Seeds ==
1. Ivana Jorović (SRB) (first round)
2. Darya Kasatkina (RUS) (quarterfinals)
3. Jeļena Ostapenko (LAT) (second round)
4. Kristína Schmiedlová (SVK) (quarterfinals)
5. Jil Teichmann (SUI) (second round)
6. Markéta Vondroušová (CZE) (second round)
7. Anhelina Kalinina (UKR) (semifinals, fourth place)
8. Iryna Shymanovich (BLR) (final, silver medallist)

== Main draw ==
Key

- Q = Qualifier
- WC = Wild card
- LL = Lucky loser
- Alt = Alternate
- ITF = ITF entry
- PR = Protected ranking
- SR = Special ranking
- SE = Special exempt
- JE = Junior exempt
- JR = Junior Accelerator Programme entrant
- CO = College Accelerator Programme entrant
- NG = Next Gen Accelerator Program entrant
- w/o = Walkover
- r = Retired
- d = Defaulted

=== Finals ===
Semifinals
7	Anhelina Kalinina (UKR)	6	6^{7}	2
8	Iryna Shymanovich (BLR)	3	7^{9}	6
Xu Shilin (CHN)	6	6
Akvilė Paražinskaitė (LTU)	2	3

Gold medal match
8	Iryna Shymanovich (BLR)	3	1
Xu Shilin (CHN)	6	6
Bronze medal match
7	Anhelina Kalinina (UKR)	3	5
Akvilė Paražinskaitė (LTU)	6	7

=== Top half ===
First round
1	I Jorović (SRB)	2	6^{3}
S Heinová (CZE)	6	7^{7}
F Stollár (HUN)	7^{7}	6
IL Roșca (ROU)	6^{5}	2
N Bains (AUS)	6	6
O Singh (IND)	4	1
A Komardina (RUS)	7^{7}	3	2
7	A Kalinina (UKR)	6^{3}	6	6
3	J Ostapenko (LAT)	3	6	6
V Kužmová (SVK)	6	0	2
K Buayam (THA)	7^{8}	6
G Minnen (BEL)	6^{6}	1
NP	C Giangreco Campiz (PAR)	6^{3}	6	6
Q Ye (CHN)	7^{7}	3	0
S Kenin (USA)	2	6^{4}
8	I Shymanovich (BLR)	6	7^{7}

Second round
S Heinová (CZE)	4	6	0
F Stollár (HUN)	6	2	6
N Bains (AUS)	2	1
7	A Kalinina (UKR)	6	6
3	J Ostapenko (LAT)	6	4	4
K Buayam (THA)	1	6	6
NP	C Giangreco Campiz (PAR)	6	1	5
8	I Shymanovich (BLR)	1	6	7

Quarterfinals
F Stollár (HUN)	1	5
7	A Kalinina (UKR)	6	7
K Buayam (THA)	7^{10}	3	4
8	I Shymanovich (BLR)	6^{8}	6	6

Semifinals
7	A Kalinina (UKR)	6	6^{7}	2
8	I Shymanovich (BLR)	3	7^{9}	6

=== Bottom half ===
First round
6	M Vondroušová (CZE)	4	6	6
NP	LS Jacobs (NAM)	6	1	0
A Bondár (HUN)	2	1
S Xu (CHN)	6	6
D-b Kim (KOR)	7	6
L Stefani (BRA)	5	2
P Hon (AUS)	3	2
4	K Schmiedlová (SVK)	6	6
5	J Teichmann (SUI)	6	7^{12}
R Zarazúa (MEX)	3	6^{10}
A Paražinskaitė (LTU)	2	6	6
MF Herazo (COL)	6	1	1
D González (ECU)	7	6
S Samir (EGY)	5	2
I Ducu (ROU)	3	0
2	D Kasatkina (RUS)	6	6

Second round
6	M Vondroušová (CZE)	3	6	2
S Xu (CHN)	6	3	6
D-b Kim (KOR)	2	1^{r}
4	K Schmiedlová (SVK)	6	1
5	J Teichmann (SUI)	7^{7}	2	6^{7}
A Paražinskaitė (LTU)	6^{5}	6	7^{9}
D González (ECU)	2	1
2	D Kasatkina (RUS)	6	6

Quarterfinals
S Xu (CHN)	6	6
4	K Schmiedlová (SVK)	1	1
A Paražinskaitė (LTU)	6	6
2	D Kasatkina (RUS)	4	4

Semifinals
S Xu (CHN)	6	6
A Paražinskaitė (LTU)	2	3
