= Tennis at the 2014 Summer Youth Olympics – Girls' doubles =

Girls' doubles
- Tennis at the 2014 Summer Youth Olympics

Events
Singles	boys	girls
Doubles	boys	girls	mixed
- Summer Youth Olympics

These are the results for the girls' doubles event at the 2014 Summer Youth Olympics.

Anhelina Kalinina of Ukraine and Iryna Shymanovich of Belarus won the gold medal, defeating Darya Kasatkina and Anastasiya Komardina of Russia in the final, 6–4, 6–4.

Jeļena Ostapenko of Latvia and Akvilė Paražinskaitė of Lithuania won the bronze medal, defeating Sofia Kenin of USA and Renata Zarazúa of Mexico in the bronze-medal match, 6–3, 7–5.

== Seeds ==
1. Ivana Jorović (SRB) / Jil Teichmann (SUI) (first round)
2. Darya Kasatkina (RUS) / Anastasiya Komardina (RUS) (final, Silver medallist)
3. Anhelina Kalinina (UKR) / Iryna Shymanovich (BLR) (gold medallist)
4. Naiktha Bains (AUS) / Priscilla Hon (AUS) (quarterfinals)

== Main draw ==
Key

- Q = Qualifier
- WC = Wild card
- LL = Lucky loser
- Alt = Alternate
- ITF = ITF entry
- PR = Protected ranking
- SR = Special ranking
- SE = Special exempt
- JE = Junior exempt
- JR = Junior Accelerator Programme entrant
- CO = College Accelerator Programme entrant
- NG = Next Gen Accelerator Program entrant
- w/o = Walkover
- r = Retired
- d = Defaulted

=== Draw ===
First round
1	I Jorović (SRB); J Teichmann (SUI)	3	7^{7}	[8]
J Ostapenko (LAT); A Paražinskaitė (LTU)	6	6^{4}	[10]
LS Jacobs (NAM); S Samir (EGY)	3	5
C Giangreco Campiz (PAR); D González (ECU)	6	7
3	A Kalinina (UKR); I Shymanovich (BLR)	6	7^{7}
MF Herazo (COL); L Stefani (BRA)	3	6^{3}
S Heinová (CZE); M Vondroušová (CZE)	4	6	[10]
S Xu (CHN); Q Ye (CHN)	6	4	[5]
I Ducu (ROU); IL Roșca (ROU)	6	5	[8]
S Kenin (USA); R Zarazúa (MEX)	1	7	[10]
G Minnen (BEL); O Singh (IND)	2	3
4	N Bains (AUS); P Hon (AUS)	6	6
A Bondár (HUN); F Stollár (HUN)	3	6	[10]
V Kužmová (SVK); K Schmiedlová (SVK)	6	3	[5]
K Buayam (THA); D Kim (KOR)	7^{7}	3	[9]
2	D Kasatkina (RUS); A Komardina (RUS)	6^{5}	6	[11]

Quarter-finals
J Ostapenko (LAT); A Paražinskaitė (LTU)	7	6
C Giangreco Campiz (PAR); D González (ECU)	5	0
3	A Kalinina (UKR); I Shymanovich (BLR)	7	7^{8}
S Heinová (CZE); M Vondroušová (CZE)	5	6^{6}
S Kenin (USA); R Zarazúa (MEX)	7^{7}	6
4	N Bains (AUS); P Hon (AUS)	6^{3}	1
A Bondár (HUN); F Stollár (HUN)	6^{2}	4
2	D Kasatkina (RUS); A Komardina (RUS)	7^{7}	6

Semi-finals
J Ostapenko (LAT); A Paražinskaitė (LTU)	1	3
3	A Kalinina (UKR); I Shymanovich (BLR)	6	6
S Kenin (USA); R Zarazúa (MEX)	2	4
2	D Kasatkina (RUS); A Komardina (RUS)	6	6

Final
3	A Kalinina (UKR); I Shymanovich (BLR)	6	6
2	D Kasatkina (RUS); A Komardina (RUS)	4	4
Bronze-medal match
J Ostapenko (LAT); A Paražinskaitė (LTU)	6	7
S Kenin (USA); R Zarazúa (MEX)	3	5
