= Tennis at the 2014 Summer Youth Olympics – Boys' singles =

Boys' singles
- Tennis at the 2014 Summer Youth Olympics

Events
| Singles | boys | girls |
| Doubles | boys | girls | mixed |
| ← 2010 · | Summer Youth Olympics | · 2018 → |

These are the results for the boys' singles event at the 2014 Summer Youth Olympics.

Kamil Majchrzak of Poland won the gold medal, defeating Orlando Luz of Brazil in the gold medal match 6–4, 7–5.

Andrey Rublev of Russia won the bronze medal, defeating Jumpei Yamasaki of Japan in the Bronze medal match 6–1, 6–3.

== Seeds ==
1. Andrey Rublev (RUS) (semifinals, Bronze medallist)
2. Orlando Luz (BRA) (final, Silver medallist)
3. Karen Khachanov (RUS) (quarterfinals)
4. Lee Duck-hee (KOR) (quarterfinals, retired)
5. Marcelo Zormann (BRA) (first round)
6. Matías Zukas (ARG) (first round)
7. Kamil Majchrzak (POL) (gold medallist)
8. Jumpei Yamasaki (JPN) (semifinals, fourth place)

== Main draw ==
=== Key ===
- Q = Qualifier
- WC = Wild card
- LL = Lucky loser
- Alt = Alternate
- SE = Special exempt
- PR = Protected ranking
- ITF = ITF entry
- JE = Junior exempt
- w/o = Walkover
- r = Retired
- d = Defaulted
- SR = Special ranking

=== Finals ===
Semifinals
1 | Andrey Rublev (RUS) | 4 | 6 | 3
7 | Kamil Majchrzak (POL) | 6 | 3 | 6
8 | Jumpei Yamasaki (JPN) | 2 | 6 | 2
2 | Orlando Luz (BRA) | 6 | 4 | 6

Gold medal match
7 | Kamil Majchrzak (POL) | 6 | 7
2 | Orlando Luz (BRA) | 4 | 5
Bronze medal match
1 | Andrey Rublev (RUS) | 6 | 6
8 | Jumpei Yamasaki (JPN) | 1 | 3

=== Top half ===
First round
1 | A Rublev (RUS) | 6 | 6
N Álvarez (PER) | 3 | 4
GO Iradukunda (BDI) | 3 | 3
M Blaško (SVK) | 6 | 6
F Bahamonde (ARG) | 5 | 6 | 7^{8}
D Appelgren (SWE) | 7 | 2 | 6^{6}
R Matsumura (JPN) | 6 | 6
5 | M Zormann (BRA) | 3 | 4
4 | D-h Lee (KOR) | 6 | 6
J Roberts (BAH) | 2 | 4
L Valero (COL) | 3 | 4
A Biró (HUN) | 6 | 6
L Harris (RSA) | 7^{12} | 6
A Rybakov (USA) | 6^{10} | 4
M Polmans (AUS) | 3 | 2
7 | K Majchrzak (POL) | 6 | 6

Second round
1 | A Rublev (RUS) | 5 | 6 | 6
M Blaško (SVK) | 7 | 2 | 2
F Bahamonde (ARG) | 6 | 6
R Matsumura (JPN) | 4 | 1
4 | D-h Lee (KOR) | 6 | 6
A Biró (HUN) | 2 | 0
L Harris (RSA) | 2 | 0
7 | K Majchrzak (POL) | 6 | 6

Quarterfinals
1 | A Rublev (RUS) | w/o
F Bahamonde (ARG)
4 | D-h Lee (KOR) | 6 | 4 | 0^{r}
7 | K Majchrzak (POL) | 3 | 6 | 0

Semifinals
1 | A Rublev (RUS) | 4 | 6 | 3
7 | K Majchrzak (POL) | 6 | 3 | 6

=== Bottom half ===
First round
8 | J Yamasaki (JPN) | 6 | 6
NP | P Rogan (MNE) | 1 | 3
A Molčan (SVK) | 6 | 3 | 2
J Zieliński (POL) | 4 | 6 | 6
P Čonkić (SRB) | 7 | 0 | 3
H Bourchier (AUS) | 5 | 6 | 6
NP | S Dissanayake (SRI) | 0 | 0
3 | K Khachanov (RUS) | 6 | 6
6 | M Zukas (ARG) | 1 | 5
Y-s Chung (KOR) | 6 | 7
C Geens (BEL) | 6 | 6
N Serdarušić (CRO) | 3 | 2
JJ Rosas (PER) | 4 | 6 | 6
R Carey (BAH) | 6 | 2 | 3
P Chrysochos (CYP) | 6 | 2 | 1
2 | O Luz (BRA) | 4 | 6 | 6

Second round
8 | J Yamasaki (JPN) | 5 | 6 | 6
J Zieliński (POL) | 7 | 1 | 2
H Bourchier (AUS) | 4 | 2
3 | K Khachanov (RUS) | 6 | 6
Y-s Chung (KOR) | 6 | 0 | 6^{5}
C Geens (BEL) | 3 | 6 | 7^{7}
JJ Rosas (PER) | 2 | 4
2 | O Luz (BRA) | 6 | 6

Quarterfinals
8 | J Yamasaki (JPN) | 6 | 6^{6} | 6
3 | K Khachanov (RUS) | 3 | 7^{8} | 1
C Geens (BEL) | 2 | 4
2 | O Luz (BRA) | 6 | 6

Semifinals
8 | J Yamasaki (JPN) | 2 | 6 | 2
2 | O Luz (BRA) | 6 | 4 | 6
