= Ecuador at the 2014 Summer Youth Olympics =

- IOC code: ECU
- NOC: Comité Olímpico Ecuatoriano

in Nanjing
- Competitors: 19 in 11 sports
- Medals: Gold 0 Silver 0 Bronze 1 Total 1

Summer Youth Olympics appearances
- 2010; 2014; 2018; 2026

Ecuador competed at the 2014 Summer Youth Olympics, in Nanjing, China from 16 August to 28 August 2014.

== Medalists ==
Medals awarded to participants of mixed-NOC (Combined) teams are represented in italics. These medals are not counted towards the individual NOC medal tally.

Medal	Name	Sport	Event	Date
Bronze	Marcarena Chiriboga Granja	Equestrian	Team Jumping	20 August

== Athletics ==
Ecuador qualified four athletes.

Qualification Legend: Q=Final A (medal); qB=Final B (non-medal); qC=Final C (non-medal); qD=Final D (non-medal); qE=Final E (non-medal)

Boys
Track & road events

Athlete	Event	Heats		Final	
Athlete	Event	Result	Rank	Result	Rank
Diego Patricio Arevalo Vizhnay	2000 m steeplechase	6:07.43	13 qB	6:11.75	13

Girls
Track & road events

Athlete	Event	Heats		Final	
Athlete	Event	Result	Rank	Result	Rank
Kelly Lady Barona	200 m	24.75	9 qB	24.74	1
Inara Cortez	100 m hurdles	14.31	14 qB	14.36	3
Karla Jaramillo	5 km walk	—N/a		24:33.05	7

== Beach Volleyball ==
Ecuador qualified a girls' team from their performance at the 2014 CSV Youth Beach Volleyball Tour.

Athletes	Event	Preliminary round	Standing	Round of 24	Round of 16	Quarterfinals	Semifinals	Final / BM	Rank
Athletes	Event	Opposition Score	Standing	Opposition Score	Opposition Score	Opposition Score	Opposition Score	Opposition Score	Rank
Valeria Batioja Ocampo; Mishelle Molina Pacheco	Girls'	McNamara – McNamara (CAN)	3 Q	Adamcikova – Valkova (CZE); L 1-2	did not advance				25
Valeria Batioja Ocampo; Mishelle Molina Pacheco	Girls'	Graudina – Kravcenoka (LAT); L 0–2 (16–21, 18–21)	3 Q	Adamcikova – Valkova (CZE); L 1-2	did not advance				25
Valeria Batioja Ocampo; Mishelle Molina Pacheco	Girls'	Palmhert – Seebach (NAM)	3 Q	Adamcikova – Valkova (CZE); L 1-2	did not advance				25
Valeria Batioja Ocampo; Mishelle Molina Pacheco	Girls'	Lassyuta – Pimenova (KAZ)	3 Q	Adamcikova – Valkova (CZE); L 1-2	did not advance				25
Valeria Batioja Ocampo; Mishelle Molina Pacheco	Girls'	Enzo – Lantignotti (ITA)	3 Q	Adamcikova – Valkova (CZE); L 1-2	did not advance				25

== Canoeing ==
Ecuador qualified one boat based on its performance at the 2013 World Junior Canoe Sprint and Slalom Championships.

Girls

Athlete	Event	Qualification		Repechage		Quarterfinals	Semifinals	Final / BM	Rank
Athlete	Event	Time	Rank	Time	Rank	Opposition Result	Opposition Result	Opposition Result	Rank
Joselyn Villon Ortega	C1 slalom	DNF		—N/a		did not advance			
Joselyn Villon Ortega	C1 sprint	2:37.369	6 R	2:47.833	3 Q	Lavoie-Parent (CAN); 2:28.768 L	did not advance		

== Cycling ==
Ecuador qualified a boys' and girls' team based on its ranking issued by the UCI.

Team

Athletes	Event	Cross-Country Eliminator		Time Trial			BMX		Cross-Country Race			Road Race			Total Pts	Rank
Athletes	Event	Rank	Points	Time	Rank	Points	Rank	Points	Time	Rank	Points	Time	Rank	Points	Total Pts	Rank
Christian Caivinagua; Jhonnatan Narvaez Prado	Boys' Team	2:39.641	6	5:16.52	7	25	16	2	-2 LAP		0	DNF; 1:39:06	n/a 47	0	33	17
Doménica Azuero González; Esther Galarza Munoz	Girls' Team	3:28.176	0	6:27.63	21	0	1	200	-1 LAP		0	DNF; 1:22:07	n/a 45	0	200	4

Mixed Relay

Athletes	Event	Cross-Country Girls' Race	Cross-Country Boys' Race	Boys' Road Race	Girls' Road Race	Total Time	Rank
Doménica Azuero González; Christian Caivinagua; Jhonnatan Narvaez Prado; Esther Galarza Munoz	Mixed Team Relay						

== Equestrian ==
Ecuador qualified a rider.

Athlete	Horse	Event	Round 1		Round 2			Total	
Athlete	Horse	Event	Penalties	Rank	Penalties	Total	Rank	Penalties	Rank
Marcarena Chiriboga Granja	Brigand	Individual Jumping	EL		did not advance			EL	
North America; Polly Serpell (CAY); María Brugal (DOM); Macarena Chiriboga Granja (ECU); Sabrina Rivera Meza (ESA); Stefanie Brand (GUA)	Giorgio Zan; Famoso; Brigand; Con-Zero; Chica	Team Jumping	4; 4; ~~8~~; ~~8~~; 0	3	0; ~~8~~; 0; 0; ~~4~~	8	3	8	3rd place, bronze medalist(s)

== Judo ==
Ecuador qualified one athlete based on its performance at the 2013 Cadet World Judo Championships.

Individual

Athlete	Event	Quarterfinals	Semifinals	Rep 1	Final / BM	Rank
Athlete	Event	Opposition Result	Opposition Result	Opposition Result	Opposition Result	Rank
Pamela Quizhpi	Girls' -44 kg	Çakmaklı (TUR); L 000-100	Did not advance	Bye	Turcheva (RUS); L 000-000	5

Team

Athletes	Event	Round of 16	Quarterfinals	Semifinals	Final	Rank
Athletes	Event	Opposition Result	Opposition Result	Opposition Result	Opposition Result	Rank
Team Berghmans; Anri Egutidze (POR); Edlene Mondelly (HAI); Michaela Polleres (AUT); Pamela Quizhpi (ECU); Domenik Schonefeldt (GER); Adela Szarzecova (CZE); Wu Zhiqiang (CHN)	Mixed Team	Team Kerr (MIX); W 4 – 3	Team Xian (MIX); L 3 – 4	did not advance		5

== Sailing ==
Ecuador was given a reallocation boat based on being a top ranked nation not yet qualified.

Athlete	Event	Race											Net Points	Final Rank
Athlete	Event	1	2	3	4	5	6	7	8	9	10	M*	Net Points	Final Rank
Romina de Iulio Garcia	Girls' Byte CII	(27)	22	17	2	15	3	7	21	Cancelled		114.00	87.00	14

== Taekwondo ==
Ecuador qualified one athlete based on its performance at the Taekwondo Qualification Tournament.

Boys

Athlete	Event	Round of 16	Quarterfinals	Semifinals	Final	Rank
Athlete	Event	Opposition Result	Opposition Result	Opposition Result	Opposition Result	Rank
Erick Arevalo	−55 kg	Tourey Gabey Mahamadou (NIG); W 16 (PTG) – 4	Ketbi (BEL); L 3 – 17 (PTG)	did not advance		5

== Tennis ==
Ecuador qualified one athlete based on the 9 June 2014 ITF World Junior Rankings.

Singles

Athlete	Event	Round of 32	Round of 16	Quarterfinals	Semifinals	Final / BM	Rank
Athlete	Event	Opposition Score	Opposition Score	Opposition Score	Opposition Score	Opposition Score	Rank
Domenica González	Girls' Singles	Samir (EGY); W 2-0; 7–5, 6–2	Kasatkina (RUS); L 0-2; 2–6, 1–6	did not advance			9

Doubles

Athletes	Event	Round of 32	Round of 16	Quarterfinals	Semifinals	Final / BM	Rank
Athletes	Event	Opposition Score	Opposition Score	Opposition Score	Opposition Score	Opposition Score	Rank
Domenica González (ECU); Camila Giangreco Campiz (PAR)	Girls' Doubles	—N/a	LS Jacobs (NAM); S Samir (EGY); W 2-0; 6–3, 7–5	J Ostapenko (LAT); A Paražinskaitė (LTU); L 0-2; 5–7, 0–6	did not advance		5
Domenica González (ECU); Juan Jose Rosas (PER)	Mixed doubles	Kužmová (SVK); Martin Blaško (SVK); L 0-2; 5–7, 2–6	did not advance				17

== Weightlifting ==
Ecuador qualified 1 quota in the girls' events based on the team ranking after the 2013 Weightlifting Youth World Championships. Later Ecuador qualified 1 boys' events quota based on the team ranking after the 2014 Weightlifting Youth Pan American Championships.

Boys

Athlete	Event	Snatch		Clean & jerk		Total	Rank
Athlete	Event	Result	Rank	Result	Rank	Total	Rank
Victor Garrido Buenaire	−56 kg	102	6	123	7	225	6

Girls

Athlete	Event	Snatch		Clean & jerk		Total	Rank
Athlete	Event	Result	Rank	Result	Rank	Total	Rank
Lisseth Ayovi Cabezas	+63 kg	100	4	125	2	225	4

== Wrestling ==
Ecuador qualified one athlete based on its performance at the 2014 Pan American Cadet Championships.

Key:
- VT – Victory by Fall.
- PP – Decision by Points – the loser with technical points.
- PO – Decision by Points – the loser without technical points.

Girls

Athlete	Event	Group stage				Final / RM	Rank
Athlete	Event	Opposition Score	Opposition Score	Opposition Score	Rank	Opposition Score	Rank
Leonela Ayovi Parraga	Freestyle -70kg	Shisterova (RUS); L 0 – 4	Strzalka (POL)	Duisenova (KAZ)	3 Q	Keju (MHL); W 4 – 0 ^{VT}	5
