= Tennis at the 2014 Summer Youth Olympics – Boys' doubles =

Boys' doubles
- Tennis at the 2014 Summer Youth Olympics

Events
Singles	boys	girls
Doubles	boys	girls	mixed
← 2010 ·	Summer Youth Olympics	· 2018 →

These are the results for the boys' doubles event at the 2014 Summer Youth Olympics.

Orlando Luz and Marcelo Zormann of Brazil won the gold medal, defeating Karen Khachanov and Andrey Rublev of Russia in the final, 7–5, 3–6, [10–3].

Ryotaro Matsumura and Jumpei Yamasaki of Japan won the bronze medal, defeating Kamil Majchrzak and Jan Zieliński of Poland in the bronze-medal match, 6–4, 0–6, [10–4].

== Seeds ==
1. Karen Khachanov (RUS) / Andrey Rublev (RUS) (final, Silver medallists)
2. Orlando Luz (BRA) / Marcelo Zormann (BRA) (gold medallists)
3. Chung Yun-seong (KOR) / Lee Duck-hee (KOR) (quarterfinals, withdrew)
4. Francisco Bahamonde (ARG) / Matías Zukas (ARG) (quarterfinals, withdrew)

== Main draw ==
=== Key ===
- Q = Qualifier
- WC = Wild card
- LL = Lucky loser
- Alt = Alternate
- SE = Special exempt
- PR = Protected ranking
- ITF = ITF entry
- JE = Junior exempt
- w/o = Walkover
- r = Retired
- d = Defaulted
- SR = Special ranking

=== Draw ===
First round
1	K Khachanov (RUS); A Rublev (RUS)	6	6
R Carey (BAH); J Roberts (BAH)	1	3
A Biró (HUN); C Geens (BEL)	6	6^{5}	[10]
D Appelgren (SWE); P Čonkić (SRB)	1	7^{7}	[3]
3	Y-s Chung (KOR); D-h Lee (KOR)	6	6
M Blaško (SVK); A Molčan (SVK)	3	3
L Harris (RSA); GO Iradukuna (BDI)	1	4
K Majchrzak (POL); J Zieliński (POL)	6	6
R Matsumura (JPN); J Yamasaki (JPN)	6	6
P Chrysochos (CYP); N Serdarušić (CRO)	3	4
A Rybakov (USA); L Valero (COL)	6^{8}	3
4	F Bahamonde (ARG); M Zukas (ARG)	7^{10}	6
N Álvarez (PER); JJ Rosas (PER)	6	6
S Dissanayake (SRI); P Rogan (MNE)	2	3
H Bourchier (AUS); M Polmans (AUS)	4	6	[7]
2	O Luz (BRA); M Zormann (BRA)	6	1	[10]

Quarter-finals
1	K Khachanov (RUS); A Rublev (RUS)	6	6
A Biró (HUN); C Geens (BEL)	4	4
3	Y-s Chung (KOR); D-h Lee (KOR)
K Majchrzak (POL); J Zieliński (POL)	w/o
R Matsumura (JPN); J Yamasaki (JPN)	w/o
4	F Bahamonde (ARG); M Zukas (ARG)
N Álvarez (PER); JJ Rosas (PER)	4	6^{5}
2	O Luz (BRA); M Zormann (BRA)	6	7^{7}

Semi-finals
1	K Khachanov (RUS); A Rublev (RUS)	4	6	[10]
K Majchrzak (POL); J Zieliński (POL)	6	3	[8]
R Matsumura (JPN); J Yamasaki (JPN)	1	2
2	O Luz (BRA); M Zormann (BRA)	6	6

Final
1	K Khachanov (RUS); A Rublev (RUS)	5	6	[3]
2	O Luz (BRA); M Zormann (BRA)	7	3	[10]
Bronze-medal match
K Majchrzak (POL); J Zieliński (POL)	4	6	[4]
R Matsumura (JPN); J Yamasaki (JPN)	6	0	[10]
