= Paraguay at the 2014 Summer Youth Olympics =

- IOC code: PAR
- NOC: Comité Olímpico Paraguayo

in Nanjing
- Competitors: 10 in 7 sports
- Medals: Gold 0 Silver 0 Bronze 0 Total 0

Summer Youth Olympics appearances
- 2010; 2014; 2018; 2026

Paraguay competed at the 2014 Summer Youth Olympics, in Nanjing, China from 16 August to 28 August 2014.

== Medalists ==
Medals awarded to participants of mixed-NOC (Combined) teams are represented in italics. These medals are not counted towards the individual NOC medal tally.

Medal	Name	Sport	Event	Date
Silver	Valeria Jimenez Caballero	Equestrian	Team Jumping	20 Aug

== Athletics ==
Paraguay qualified one athlete.

Qualification Legend: Q=Final A (medal); qB=Final B (non-medal); qC=Final C (non-medal); qD=Final D (non-medal); qE=Final E (non-medal)

Girls
Field events

Athlete	Event	Qualification		Final	
Athlete	Event	Distance	Rank	Distance	Rank
Araceli Llanes Aquino	Javelin throw	39.65	17 qB	42.19	15

== Beach Volleyball ==
Paraguay qualified a boys' and girls' team from their performance at the 2014 CSV Youth Beach Volleyball Tour.

Athletes	Event	Preliminary round	Standing	Round of 24	Round of 16	Quarterfinals	Semifinals	Final / BM	Rank
Athletes	Event	Opposition Score	Standing	Opposition Score	Opposition Score	Opposition Score	Opposition Score	Opposition Score	Rank
Renato Bogarin Caceres; Elioth Frutos Toewn	Boys'	Siddihaluge/Mallawa (SRI); L 1 – 2	4 Q	Dmitriyev/Polichshuk (KAZ); W 2 – 1	Hernandez/Gomez (VEN); L 0 – 2	did not advance			9
Renato Bogarin Caceres; Elioth Frutos Toewn	Boys'	Flores/Alvarez (GUA); W 2 – 0	4 Q	Dmitriyev/Polichshuk (KAZ); W 2 – 1	Hernandez/Gomez (VEN); L 0 – 2	did not advance			9
Renato Bogarin Caceres; Elioth Frutos Toewn	Boys'	Stoyanovskiy/Iarzutkin (RUS); L 0 – 2	4 Q	Dmitriyev/Polichshuk (KAZ); W 2 – 1	Hernandez/Gomez (VEN); L 0 – 2	did not advance			9
Renato Bogarin Caceres; Elioth Frutos Toewn	Boys'	Ndayishimiye/Niyongabo (BDI); W 2 – 0	4 Q	Dmitriyev/Polichshuk (KAZ); W 2 – 1	Hernandez/Gomez (VEN); L 0 – 2	did not advance			9
Renato Bogarin Caceres; Elioth Frutos Toewn	Boys'	Mol/Berntsen (NOR); L 0 – 2	4 Q	Dmitriyev/Polichshuk (KAZ); W 2 – 1	Hernandez/Gomez (VEN); L 0 – 2	did not advance			9
Erika Mongelos Bobadilla; Michelle Valiente	Girls'	Tangkaeo/Kawfong (THA); W 2 – 0	1 Q	Bye	Valkova/Adamcikova (CZE); L 0 – 2	did not advance			9
Erika Mongelos Bobadilla; Michelle Valiente	Girls'	Richard/Placette (FRA); W 2 – 0	1 Q	Bye	Valkova/Adamcikova (CZE); L 0 – 2	did not advance			9
Erika Mongelos Bobadilla; Michelle Valiente	Girls'	Essumang/Douduwa (GHA); W 2 – 0	1 Q	Bye	Valkova/Adamcikova (CZE); L 0 – 2	did not advance			9
Erika Mongelos Bobadilla; Michelle Valiente	Girls'	Giron/Bethancourt (GUA); W 2 – 0	1 Q	Bye	Valkova/Adamcikova (CZE); L 0 – 2	did not advance			9
Erika Mongelos Bobadilla; Michelle Valiente	Girls'	Radl/Gesslbauer (AUT); L 1 – 2	1 Q	Bye	Valkova/Adamcikova (CZE); L 0 – 2	did not advance			9

== Equestrian ==
Paraguay qualified a rider.

Athlete	Horse	Event	Round 1		Round 2			Total	
Athlete	Horse	Event	Penalties	Rank	Penalties	Total	Rank	Penalties	Rank
Valeria Jimenez Caballero	Cenai	Individual Jumping	4	11	Eliminated				
South America; Martina Campi (ARG); Bianca de Souza Rodrigues (BRA); Antoine Porte (CHI); Valeria Jimenez Caballero (PAR); Francisco Calvelo Martinez (URU)	Darina; La Gomera; Zyralynn; Cenai; Lord Power	Team Jumping	4; ~~EL~~; ~~20~~; 0; 0	2	0; ~~20~~; ~~8~~; 0; 0	4	2	4	2nd place, silver medalist(s)

== Rowing ==
Paraguay qualified one boat based on its performance at the Latin American Qualification Regatta.

Athlete	Event	Heats		Repechage		Semifinals		Final	
Athlete	Event	Time	Rank	Time	Rank	Time	Rank	Time	Rank
Alejandra Alonso	Girls' Single Sculls	3:52.60	1 SA/B	Bye		3:55.40	3 FA	4:02.91	6

Qualification Legend: FA=Final A (medal); FB=Final B (non-medal); FC=Final C (non-medal); FD=Final D (non-medal); SA/B=Semifinals A/B; SC/D=Semifinals C/D; R=Repechage

== Table Tennis ==
Paraguay was given a quota to compete by the tripartite committee.

Singles

Athlete	Event	Group Stage	Rank	Round of 16	Quarterfinals	Semifinals	Final / BM	Rank
Athlete	Event	Opposition Score	Rank	Opposition Score	Opposition Score	Opposition Score	Opposition Score	Rank
Alejandro Toranzos	Boys	Group E M Kim (KOR); L 0 – 3	4 qB	A Szudi (HUN); L 2 – 3	did not advance			25
Alejandro Toranzos	Boys	A Ghallab (EGY); L 2 – 3	4 qB	A Szudi (HUN); L 2 – 3	did not advance			25
Alejandro Toranzos	Boys	D Chen (POR); L 0 – 3	4 qB	A Szudi (HUN); L 2 – 3	did not advance			25

Team

Athletes	Event	Group Stage	Rank	Round of 16	Quarterfinals	Semifinals	Final / BM	Rank
Athletes	Event	Opposition Score	Rank	Opposition Score	Opposition Score	Opposition Score	Opposition Score	Rank
Latin America 3 Chelsea Edghill (GUY); Alejandro Toranzos (PAR)	Mixed	Thailand; T Khetkhuan (THA); P Tanviriyavechakul (THA); L 0 – 3	4 qB	Latin America 2 G Arvelo (VEN); F Tenti (ARG); L 1 – 2	did not advance			25
Latin America 3 Chelsea Edghill (GUY); Alejandro Toranzos (PAR)	Mixed	Austria; A Levenko (AUT); K Mischek (AUT); L 0 – 3	4 qB	Latin America 2 G Arvelo (VEN); F Tenti (ARG); L 1 – 2	did not advance			25
Latin America 3 Chelsea Edghill (GUY); Alejandro Toranzos (PAR)	Mixed	Croatia; L Rakovac (CRO); T Pucar (CRO); L 0 – 3	4 qB	Latin America 2 G Arvelo (VEN); F Tenti (ARG); L 1 – 2	did not advance			25

Qualification Legend: Q=Main Bracket (medal); qB=Consolation Bracket (non-medal)

== Swimming ==
Paraguay qualified one swimmer.

Boys

Athlete	Event	Heat		Final	
Athlete	Event	Time	Rank	Time	Rank
Matias Lopez Chaparro	200 m backstroke	2:02.55	8 Q	2:01.53	8
Matias Lopez Chaparro	200 m individual medley	2:06.06	12	did not advance	

== Tennis ==
Paraguay was given a quota to compete by the tripartite committee.

Singles

Athlete	Event	Round of 32	Round of 16	Quarterfinals	Semifinals	Final / BM	Rank
Athlete	Event	Opposition Score	Opposition Score	Opposition Score	Opposition Score	Opposition Score	Rank
Camila Giangreco Campiz	Girls' Singles	Q Ye (CHN); W 6^{3} – 7, 6 – 3, 6 – 0	I Shymanovich (BLR); L 6 – 1, 1 – 6, 5 – 7	did not advance			

Doubles

Athletes	Event	Round of 32	Round of 16	Quarterfinals	Semifinals	Final / BM	Rank
Athletes	Event	Opposition Score	Opposition Score	Opposition Score	Opposition Score	Opposition Score	Rank
Camila Giangreco Campiz (PAR); Domenica Gonzalez (ECU)	Girls' Doubles	—N/a	LS Jacobs (NAM); S Samir (EGY); W 6 – 3, 7 – 5	J Ostapenko (LAT); A Paražinskaitė (LTU); L 5 – 7, 0 – 6	did not advance		
Camila Giangreco Campiz (PAR); Marcelo Zormann (BRA)	Mixed Doubles	M Vondroušová (CZE); N Álvarez (PER); W 7 – 5, 7 – 5	S Samir (EGY); L Harris (RSA); W 5 – 7, 6 – 3, [10] – [5]	F Stollár (HUN); K Majchrzak (POL); L 5 – 7, 2 – 6	did not advance		
