= Lithuania at the 2014 Summer Youth Olympics =

- IOC code: LTU
- NOC: Lithuanian National Olympic Committee
- Website: www.ltok.lt (in Lithuanian and English)

in Nanjing
- Competitors: 21 in 9 sports
- Medals Ranked 19th: Gold 3 Silver 2 Bronze 2 Total 7

Summer Youth Olympics appearances (overview)
- 2010; 2014; 2018

Lithuania competed at the 2014 Summer Youth Olympics, in Nanjing, China from 16 August to 28 August 2014.

== Medalists ==
Medal	Name	Sport	Event
Gold	Rūta Meilutytė	Swimming	Girls' 50 m breaststroke
Gold	Rūta Meilutytė	Swimming	Girls' 100 m breaststroke
Gold	Justas Vazalis; Kristupas Žemaitis; Jonas Lekšas; Martynas Sajus	Basketball	Boys' 3 x 3 Teams
Silver	Povilas Strazdas	Swimming	Boys' 200 m individual medley
Silver	Vadim Korobov	Canoeing	Boys' Head-to-head Sprint C1
Bronze	Akvilė Paražinskaitė	Tennis	Girls' Singles
Bronze	Dovidas Vaivada	Modern pentathlon	Boys' Individual
Bronze	(Lithuania) Akvilė Paražinskaitė (Latvia) Jeļena Ostapenko	Tennis	Girls' doubles

== Athletics ==
Lithuania qualified three athletes.

Qualification Legend: Q=Final A (medal); qB=Final B (non-medal); qC=Final C (non-medal); qD=Final D (non-medal); qE=Final E (non-medal)

Boys
Track & road events

Athlete	Event	Heats		Final	
Athlete	Event	Result	Rank	Result	Rank
Benediktas Mickus	800 m	1.51.54 PB	10th QB	1:52.40	9th

Field Events

Athlete	Event	Qualification		Final	
Athlete	Event	Distance	Rank	Distance	Rank
Karolis Maisuradzė	Shot put	17.58	9th QB	17.81	11th
Tomas Vasiliauskas	Hammer throw	75.06	5th QA	77.49	4th

== Basketball ==
Lithuania qualified a boys' team based on the 1 June 2014 FIBA 3x3 National Federation Rankings.

Skills Competition

Athlete	Event	Qualification				Final			
Athlete	Event	Round 1	Round 2	Total	Rank	Round 1	Round 2	Total	Rank
Kristupas Zemaitis	Boys' Dunk Contest	26	25	51	5	did not advance			

=== Boys' tournament ===
Roster

- Jonas Lekšas
- Martynas Sajus
- Justas Važalis
- Kristupas Žemaitis

Group Stage

Pos	Team	Pld	W	L	PF	PA	PD	Pts	Qualification
1	Lithuania	9	9	0	165	129	+36	18	Round of 16
2	Slovenia	9	7	2	152	120	+32	16	Round of 16
3	China	9	6	3	164	143	+21	15 (Note: CHN +1, PUR −1)	Round of 16
4	Puerto Rico	9	6	3	152	136	+16	15	Round of 16
5	Poland	9	5	4	153	127	+26	14	Round of 16
6	France	9	4	5	151	127	+24	13	Round of 16
7	Hungary	9	3	6	158	165	−7	12	Round of 16
8	Uruguay	9	2	7	103	154	−51	11 (Note: URU +1, GER −1)	Round of 16
9	Germany	9	2	7	118	149	−31	11	Eliminated
10	Indonesia	9	1	8	86	152	−66	10	Eliminated

Notes:

18 August 2014
18:00

Lithuania	17–14	Puerto Rico

Wutaishan Sports Center, Nanjing

18 August 2014
21:00

Indonesia	13–14	Lithuania

Wutaishan Sports Center, Nanjing

19 August 2014
19:20

Lithuania	18–14	China

Wutaishan Sports Center, Nanjing

20 August 2014
18:00

Hungary	13–19	Lithuania

Wutaishan Sports Center, Nanjing

20 August 2014
21:20

Lithuania	21–15	Germany

Wutaishan Sports Center, Nanjing

22 August 2014
20:00

Uruguay	12–15	Lithuania

Wutaishan Sports Center, Nanjing

23 August 2014
18:20

Lithuania	21–14	Slovenia

Wutaishan Sports Center, Nanjing

23 August 2014
21:40

Lithuania	21–17	Poland

Wutaishan Sports Center, Nanjing

24 August 2014
19:00

France	17–19	Lithuania

Wutaishan Sports Center, Nanjing

Knockout Stage

Round of 16	Quarterfinals	Semifinals	Final	Rank
Opposition Score	Opposition Score	Opposition Score	Opposition Score	Rank
Tunisia; W 22-11	Poland; W 16–12	Russia; W 13–10	France; W 18-16	1st place, gold medalist(s)

== Beach volleyball ==
Lithuania qualified a team by being the highest ranked nation not yet qualified.

Athletes	Event	Preliminary round	Standing	Round of 24	Round of 16	Quarterfinals	Semifinals	Final / BM	Rank
Athletes	Event	Opposition Score	Standing	Opposition Score	Opposition Score	Opposition Score	Opposition Score	Opposition Score	Rank
Matas Navickas; Edvinas Vaškelis	Boys'	Rudolf (GER)/ Stadie (GER); L 0–2	Q	Aulisi – Aveiro (ARG); L	did not advance				25
Matas Navickas; Edvinas Vaškelis	Boys'	Moore (NZL)/ Robinson (NZL)	Q	Aulisi – Aveiro (ARG); L	did not advance				25
Matas Navickas; Edvinas Vaškelis	Boys'	Moussa (CGO)/ Ossolo (CGO); W 2–0	Q	Aulisi – Aveiro (ARG); L	did not advance				25
Matas Navickas; Edvinas Vaškelis	Boys'	Lanci (BRA)/ Wanderley (BRA)	Q	Aulisi – Aveiro (ARG); L	did not advance				25
Matas Navickas; Edvinas Vaškelis	Boys'	Shavar (JAM)/ Hutchinson (JAM)	Q	Aulisi – Aveiro (ARG); L	did not advance				25

== Canoeing ==
Lithuania qualified one boat based on its performance at the 2013 World Junior Canoe Sprint and Slalom Championships.

Boys

Athlete	Event	Qualification		Repechage		Round of 16		Quarterfinals	Semifinals	Final / BM	Rank
Athlete	Event	Time	Rank	Time	Rank	Time	Rank	Opposition Result	Opposition Result	Opposition Result	Rank
Vadim Korobov	C1 slalom	1:51.797	10 R	1:49.510	5	—N/a		did not advance			
Vadim Korobov	C1 sprint	1:47.663	3 Q	—N/a		1:48.769	3 Q	Chaban (UKR); W 1:45.359	Guliev (UZB); W 1:47.319	Tarnovschi (MDA); L 2:01.407	2nd place, silver medalist(s)

== Cycling ==
Lithuania qualified a girls' team based on its ranking issued by the UCI.

Team

Athletes	Event	Cross-Country Eliminator		Time Trial			BMX		Cross-Country Race			Road Race			Total Pts	Rank
Athletes	Event	Rank	Points	Time	Rank	Points	Rank	Points	Time	Rank	Points	Time	Rank	Points	Total Pts	Rank
Ema Manikaite; Ernesta Strainyte	Girls' Team	11	8	6:22.76	18	0	11	16	-1 LAP	20	0	1:12:36; 1:12:36	2; 8	100	124	9

Mixed Relay

Athletes	Event	Cross-Country Girls' Race	Cross-Country Boys' Race	Boys' Road Race	Girls' Road Race	Total Time	Rank
Ema Manikaite (LTU); Jovan Jovanoski (MKD); Andrej Petrovski (MKD); Ernesta Strainyte (LTU)	Mixed Team Relay					18:16	7

== Modern pentathlon ==
Lithuania qualified one athlete based on its performance at the European YOG Qualifiers and another based on its performance at the 2014 Youth A World Championships.

Athlete	Event	Fencing Ranking Round (épée one touch)		Swimming (200 m freestyle)			Fencing Final Round (épée one touch)			Combined: Shooting/Running (10 m air pistol)/(3000 m)			Total Points	Final Rank
Athlete	Event	Results	Rank	Time	Rank	Points	Results	Rank	Points	Time	Rank	Points	Total Points	Final Rank
Dovidas Vaivada	Boys' Individual		5		4	331					3		1151	Bronze
Aurelija Tamašauskaitė	Girls' Individual												1030	4
Dovidas Vaivada (LTU); Ailén Cisneros (ARG)	Mixed Relay													
Aurelija Tamasauskaite (LTU); Unknown	Mixed Relay													

== Rowing ==
Lithuania qualified two boats based on its performance at the 2013 World Rowing Junior Championships.

Athlete	Event	Heats		Repechage		Semifinals		Final	
Athlete	Event	Time	Rank	Time	Rank	Time	Rank	Time	Rank
Andrius Lapatiukas	Boys' Single Sculls	3:39.98	5 R	3:23.95	2 SA/B	3:42.66	6 FB	3:35.88	10
Sonata Petrikaitė	Girls' Single Sculls	3:48.20	1 SA/B	—N/a		3:48.10	3 FA	3:54.06	4

Qualification Legend: FA=Final A (medal); FB=Final B (non-medal); FC=Final C (non-medal); FD=Final D (non-medal); SA/B=Semifinals A/B; SC/D=Semifinals C/D; R=Repechage

== Swimming ==
Lithuania qualified four swimmers.

Boys

Athlete	Event	Heat		Semifinal		Final	
Athlete	Event	Time	Rank	Time	Rank	Time	Rank
Povilas Strazdas	100 m freestyle	50.69 PB	10th Q	50.66 PB	11th	did not advance	
Povilas Strazdas	400 m freestyle	3:55.62	9th	—N/a		did not advance	
Povilas Strazdas	50 m butterfly	24.74 PB	8th Q	24.83	13th	did not advance	
Povilas Strazdas	200 m individual medley	2:03.50	4th Q	—N/a		2:02.32 PB	2nd place, silver medalist(s)
Paulius Grigaliūnas	100 m breaststroke	1:03.50 PB	12th Q	1:03.39 PB	13th	did not advance	
Paulius Grigaliūnas	200 m breaststroke	2:18.32 PB	17th	—N/a		did not advance	

Girls

Athlete	Event	Heat		Semifinal		Final	
Athlete	Event	Time	Rank	Time	Rank	Time	Rank
Rūta Meilutytė	100 m freestyle	56.20	9th	55.46 SB	4th	55.17 SB	5th
Rūta Meilutytė	50 m breaststroke	32.11	3rd Q	31.67	1st Q	30.14	1st place, gold medalist(s)
Rūta Meilutytė	100 m breaststroke	1:08.97	2nd Q	1:07.83	1st Q	1:05.39	1st place, gold medalist(s)
Rūta Meilutytė	200 m individual medley	DNS		—N/a		did not advance	
Ugnė Mažutaitytė	200 m backstroke	2:17.53	14th	—N/a		did not advance	

Mixed

Athlete	Event	Heat		Final	
Athlete	Event	Time	Rank	Time	Rank
Paulius Grigaliunas; Ugne Mazutaityte; Rūta Meilutytė; Povilas Strazdas	4 × 100 m freestyle relay	DNS		did not advance	

== Tennis ==
Lithuania qualified one athlete based on the 9 June 2014 ITF World Junior Rankings.

Singles

Athlete	Event	Round of 32	Round of 16	Quarterfinals	Semifinals	Final / BM	Rank
Athlete	Event	Opposition Score	Opposition Score	Opposition Score	Opposition Score	Opposition Score	Rank
Akvilė Paražinskaitė	Girls' Singles	2–6, 6–1, 6–1 def. María Herazo González (COL)	6–7^{(5–7)}, 6–2, 7–6^{(9–7)} def. [5] Jil Teichmann (SUI)	6–4, 6–4 def. [2] Daria Kasatkina (RUS)	2–6, 3-6 lost to Xu Shilin (CHN)	6–3, 7–5 def. [7] Anhelina Kalinina (UKR)	Bronze

Doubles

Athletes	Event	Round of 32	Round of 16	Quarterfinals	Semifinals	Final / BM	Rank
Athletes	Event	Opposition Score	Opposition Score	Opposition Score	Opposition Score	Opposition Score	Rank
Akvilė Paražinskaitė (LTU); Jeļena Ostapenko (LAT)	Girls' Doubles	—N/a	6–3, 6–7, [10–8] def. [1] Ivana Jorović (SRB); Jil Teichmann (SUI)	7–6, 6–0 def. Camila Giangreco Campiz (PAR); Doménica González (ECU)	1–6, 3-6 lost to [3] Anhelina Kalinina (UKR); Iryna Shymanovich (LTU)	6–3, 7-5 def. Sofia Kenin (USA); Renata Zarazúa (MEX)	Bronze
Akvilė Paražinskaitė (LTU); Nino Serarusic (CRO)	Mixed Doubles	6–3, 3–6, [8–10] lost to Greetje Minnen (BEL); Clement Geens (BEL)	did not advance				17
