= Poland at the 2014 Summer Youth Olympics =

- IOC code: POL
- NOC: Polish Olympic Committee
- Website: www.pkol.pl

in Nanjing
- Competitors: 59 in 21 sports
- Medals Ranked 12th: Gold 5 Silver 0 Bronze 1 Total 6

Summer Youth Olympics appearances
- 2010; 2014; 2018

Poland competed at the 2014 Summer Youth Olympics, in Nanjing, China from 16 August to 28 August 2014.

== Medalists ==
| Medal | Name | Sport | Event | Date |
|---|---|---|---|---|
| Gold | Agata Nowak | Shooting | 10 metre air pistol | 17 Aug |
| Gold | Andrzej Rządkowski | Fencing | Foil | 19 Aug |
| Gold | Kamil Majchrzak | Tennis | Singles | 23 Aug |
| Gold | Konrad Bukowiecki | Athletics | Shot put | 24 Aug |
| Gold | Elzbieta Wojcik | Boxing | -75 Kg | 26 Aug |
| Bronze | Natalia Strzalka | Wrestling | -70 Kg | 26 Aug |

== Archery ==
Poland qualified two archers based on its performance at the 2013 World Archery Youth Championships.

Individual

| Athlete | Event | Ranking round | | Round of 32 | Round of 16 | Quarterfinals | Semifinals | Final / BM | Rank |
| Athlete | Event | Score | Seed | Opposition Score | Opposition Score | Opposition Score | Opposition Score | Opposition Score | Rank |
|---|---|---|---|---|---|---|---|---|---|
| Marek Szafran | Boys' Individual | 662 | 15 | Peters (CAN); W 6–2 | Verma (IND); L 2–6 | Did not advance | | | 9 |
| Sylwia Zyzańska | Girls' Individual | 643 | 10 | Mugabilzada (AZE); W 7–3 | Fang (TPE); W 6–5 | Machado (BRA); L 5–6 | Did not advance | | 5 |

Team

| Athletes | Event | Ranking round | | Round of 32 | Round of 16 | Quarterfinals | Semifinals | Final / BM | Rank |
| Athletes | Event | Score | Seed | Opposition Score | Opposition Score | Opposition Score | Opposition Score | Opposition Score | Rank |
|---|---|---|---|---|---|---|---|---|---|
| Marek Szafran (POL); Ana Machado (BRA) | Mixed Team | 1289 | 7 | Capote (VEN); Giaccheri (ITA); W 5-3 | Denny (GBR); Koike (JPN); L 2-6 | Did not advance | | | 9 |
| Sylwia Zyzanska (POL); Anton Komar (UKR) | Mixed Team | 1277 | 22 | Raysin (ISR); Gazoz (TUR); L 4-5 | Did not advance | | | | 17 |

== Athletics ==
Poland qualified 16 athletes.

Qualification Legend: Q=Final A (medal); qB=Final B (non-medal); qC=Final C (non-medal); qD=Final D (non-medal); qE=Final E (non-medal)

Boys
Track & road events

| Athlete | Event | Heats | | Final | |
| Athlete | Event | Result | Rank | Result | Rank |
|---|---|---|---|---|---|
| Wojciech Kaczor | 200 m | 22.01 | 14 qB | DQ | |
| Paweł Chmiel | 400 m | 49.42 | 16 qC | DNS | |
| Mateusz Borkowski | 1500 m | 3:55.78 | 15 qB | 3:55.58 | 13 |
| Dawid Żebrowski | 110 m hurdles | 13.64 | 6 Q | 13.71 | 6 |

Field Events

| Athlete | Event | Qualification | | Final | |
| Athlete | Event | Distance | Rank | Distance | Rank |
|---|---|---|---|---|---|
| Bartosz Wójcik | Long jump | NM | qB | DNS | |
| Igor Kopala | High jump | 2.10 | 5 Q | 2.08 | 6 |
| Konrad Bukowiecki | Shot put | 22.34 | 1 Q | 23.17 PB | 1st place, gold medalist(s) |
| Mateusz Strzeszewski | Javelin throw | 70.93 | 7 Q | 64.29 | 8 |
| Adrian Muszyński | Hammer throw | 71.44 PB | 9 qB | 67.69 | 11 |

Girls
Track & road events

| Athlete | Event | Heats | | Final | |
| Athlete | Event | Result | Rank | Result | Rank |
|---|---|---|---|---|---|
| Ewa Swoboda | 100 m | 11.30 PB | 1 Q | DQ | |
| Sylwia Indeka | 1500 m | 4:30.80 | 11 qB | 4:36.33 | 11 |
| Aneta Konieczek | 2000 m steeplechase | 6:46.47 PB | 6 Q | 6:52.78 | 9 |
| Olga Niedzialek | 5 km walk | — | | 24:39.53 | 9 |

Field events

| Athlete | Event | Qualification | | Final | |
| Athlete | Event | Distance | Rank | Distance | Rank |
|---|---|---|---|---|---|
| Maja Ślepowrońska | Shot put | 16.40 PB | 4 Q | 16.62 PB | 4 |
| Aleksandra Ostrowska | Javelin throw | 52.21 | 4 Q | 51.79 | 5 |
| Magdalena Zycer | Hammer throw | 61.12 | 8 Q | 55.60 | 8 |

== Badminton ==
Poland qualified two athletes based on the 2 May 2014 BWF Junior World Rankings.

Singles

| Athlete | Event | Group stage | | | | Quarterfinal | Semifinal | Final / BM | Rank |
| Athlete | Event | Opposition Score | Opposition Score | Opposition Score | Rank | Opposition Score | Opposition Score | Opposition Score | Rank |
|---|---|---|---|---|---|---|---|---|---|
| Krzysztof Jakowczuk | Boys' Singles | Penalver (ESP); L 0-2 | Tsuneyama (JPN); L 0-2 | Mihigo (UGA); W 2-0 | 3 | did not advance | | | |
| Magda Konieczna | Girls' Singles | Gadde (IND); L 0-2 | Hartawan (INA); L 0-2 | lai (AUS); L 0-2 | 4 | did not advance | | | |

Doubles

| Athlete | Event | Group stage | | | | Quarterfinal | Semifinal | Final / BM | Rank |
| Athlete | Event | Opposition Score | Opposition Score | Opposition Score | Rank | Opposition Score | Opposition Score | Opposition Score | Rank |
|---|---|---|---|---|---|---|---|---|---|
| Clara Azurmendi (ESP); Krzysztof Jakowczuk (POL) | Mixed Doubles | Dhami (NEP); Ongbumrungpan (THA); L 1-2 | Tsuneyama (JPN); Lee (TPE); L 0-2 | Lee (HKG); Konieczna (POL); L 1-2 | 4 | did not advance | | | |
| Magdalena Konieczna (POL); Lee Cheuk Yiu (HKG) | Mixed Doubles | Tsuneyama (JPN); Lee (TPE); L 1-2 | Dhami (NEP); Ongbumrungpan (THA); W 2-1 | Jakowczuk (POL); Azurmendi (ESP); W 2-1 | 2 | did not advance | | | |

== Basketball ==
Poland qualified boys team based on its FIBA 3x3 federation ranking.

=== Boys' tournament ===
Roster

- Maciej Bojanowski
- Mateusz Fatz
- Dominik Olejniczak
- Igor Wadowski

Group stage

| Pos | Team | Pld | W | L | PF | PA | PD | Pts | Qualification |
|---|---|---|---|---|---|---|---|---|---|
| 1 | Lithuania | 9 | 9 | 0 | 165 | 129 | +36 | 18 | Round of 16 |
| 2 | Slovenia | 9 | 7 | 2 | 152 | 120 | +32 | 16 | Round of 16 |
| 3 | China | 9 | 6 | 3 | 164 | 143 | +21 | 15 (Note: CHN +1, PUR −1) | Round of 16 |
| 4 | Puerto Rico | 9 | 6 | 3 | 152 | 136 | +16 | 15 | Round of 16 |
| 5 | Poland | 9 | 5 | 4 | 153 | 127 | +26 | 14 | Round of 16 |
| 6 | France | 9 | 4 | 5 | 151 | 127 | +24 | 13 | Round of 16 |
| 7 | Hungary | 9 | 3 | 6 | 158 | 165 | −7 | 12 | Round of 16 |
| 8 | Uruguay | 9 | 2 | 7 | 103 | 154 | −51 | 11 (Note: URU +1, GER −1) | Round of 16 |
| 9 | Germany | 9 | 2 | 7 | 118 | 149 | −31 | 11 | Eliminated |
| 10 | Indonesia | 9 | 1 | 8 | 86 | 152 | −66 | 10 | Eliminated |

Notes:

18 August 2014
18:20

| Poland | 14–12 | France |

Wutaishan Sports Center, Nanjing

18 August 2014
20:40

| Puerto Rico | 22–20 | Poland |

Wutaishan Sports Center, Nanjing

19 August 2014
18:40

| Poland | 17–3 | Indonesia |

Wutaishan Sports Center, Nanjing

20 August 2014
17:00

| China | 18–15 | Poland |

Wutaishan Sports Center, Nanjing

20 August 2014
20:40

| Poland | 21–18 | Hungary |

Wutaishan Sports Center, Nanjing

22 August 2014
19:40

| Germany | 12–15 | Poland |

Wutaishan Sports Center, Nanjing

23 August 2014
17:20

| Poland | 22–5 | Uruguay |

Wutaishan Sports Center, Nanjing

23 August 2014
21:40

| Lithuania | 21–17 | Poland |

Wutaishan Sports Center, Nanjing

24 August 2014
19:20

| Poland | 12–16 | Slovenia |

Wutaishan Sports Center, Nanjing

Knockout Stage

| Round of 16 | Quarterfinals | Semifinals | Final | Rank |
| Opposition Score | Opposition Score | Opposition Score | Opposition Score | Rank |
|---|---|---|---|---|
| New Zealand; W 16-14 | Lithuania; L 12–16 | did not advance | | 5 |

== Beach volleyball ==
Poland qualified a boys' team from their performance at the 2014 CEV Youth Continental Cup Final.

| Athletes | Event | Preliminary round | Standing | Round of 24 | Round of 16 | Quarterfinals | Semifinals | Final / BM | Rank |
| Athletes | Event | Opposition Score | Standing | Opposition Score | Opposition Score | Opposition Score | Opposition Score | Opposition Score | Rank |
|---|---|---|---|---|---|---|---|---|---|
| Dominik Kmiecik; Jakub Macura | Boys' | Kratz (AUT); Pristauz (AUT); L 0 - 2 | 4 Q | Berntsen (NOR); Mol (NOR); L 1 - 2 | Did not advance | | | | 17 |
| Dominik Kmiecik; Jakub Macura | Boys' | Gomez (VEN); Hernandez (VEN); L 1 - 2 | 4 Q | Berntsen (NOR); Mol (NOR); L 1 - 2 | Did not advance | | | | 17 |
| Dominik Kmiecik; Jakub Macura | Boys' | Ndagano (RWA); Ndayisabye (RWA); W 2 - 0 | 4 Q | Berntsen (NOR); Mol (NOR); L 1 - 2 | Did not advance | | | | 17 |
| Dominik Kmiecik; Jakub Macura | Boys' | Ashfiya (INA); Licardo (INA); L 0 - 2 | 4 Q | Berntsen (NOR); Mol (NOR); L 1 - 2 | Did not advance | | | | 17 |
| Dominik Kmiecik; Jakub Macura | Boys' | DeFalco (USA); Richard (USA); W 2 - 0 | 4 Q | Berntsen (NOR); Mol (NOR); L 1 - 2 | Did not advance | | | | 17 |

== Boxing ==
Poland qualified one boxer based on its performance at the 2014 AIBA Youth World Championships

Girls

| Athlete | Event | Preliminaries | Semifinals | Final / RM | Rank |
| Athlete | Event | Opposition Result | Opposition Result | Opposition Result | Rank |
|---|---|---|---|---|---|
| Elzbieta Wojcik | -75 kg | Michel (FRA); W 3-0 | Parker (AUS); W 2-0 | Chen (TPE); W 2-1 | 1st place, gold medalist(s) |

== Canoeing ==
Poland qualified three boats based on its performance at the 2013 World Junior Canoe Sprint and Slalom Championships.

Boys

| Athlete | Event | Qualification | | Repechage | | Round of 16 | | Quarterfinals | Semifinals | Final / BM | Rank |
| Athlete | Event | Time | Rank | Time | Rank | Time | Rank | Opposition Result | Opposition Result | Opposition Result | Rank |
|---|---|---|---|---|---|---|---|---|---|---|---|
| Marcel Holdak | C1 slalom | 1:28.977 | 6 R | DSQ | | — | | Did not advance | | | |
| Marcel Holdak | C1 sprint | 1:51.845 | 8 Q | — | | 1:47.480 | 2 Q | Hajek (CZE); L 1:47.703 | Did not advance | | 6 |
| Patryk Grzelka | K1 slalom | 1:26.547 | 10 Q | — | | 1:31.689 | 14 | Did not advance | | | 14 |
| Patryk Grzelka | K1 sprint | 1:41.687 | 10 R | 1:42.653 | 2 Q | 1:38.676 | 9 | Did not advance | | | 9 |

Girls

| Athlete | Event | Qualification | | Repechage | | Round of 16 | | Quarterfinals | Semifinals | Final / BM | Rank |
| Athlete | Event | Time | Rank | Time | Rank | Time | Rank | Opposition Result | Opposition Result | Opposition Result | Rank |
|---|---|---|---|---|---|---|---|---|---|---|---|
| Klaudia Zwolinska | K1 slalom | 1:20.941 | 7 Q | — | | 1:20.381 | 7 Q | Prigent (FRA); L 1:24.114 | Did not advance | | 7 |
| Klaudia Zwolinska | K1 sprint | 2:36.067 | 18 R | 2:26.213 | 9 | Did not advance | | | | | |

== Cycling ==
Poland qualified a boys' and girls' team based on its ranking issued by the UCI.

Team

| Athletes | Event | Cross-Country Eliminator | | Time Trial | | | BMX | | Cross-Country Race | | | Road Race | | | Total Pts | Rank |
| Athletes | Event | Rank | Points | Time | Rank | Points | Rank | Points | Time | Rank | Points | Time | Rank | Points | Total Pts | Rank |
|---|---|---|---|---|---|---|---|---|---|---|---|---|---|---|---|---|
| Szymon Sajnok; Damian Slawek | Boys' Team | 3 | 65 | 5:10.12 | 2 | 80 | 23 | 0 | -3 LAP | 24 | 0 | 1:37:23; 1:37:23 | 5; 22 | 40 | 185 | 8 |
| Agata Drozdek; Natalia Nowotarska | Girls' Team | 10 | 10 | 11:58.30 | 31 | 0 | 27 | 0 | -1 LAP | 22 | 0 | 1:12:36; 1:14:14 | 19; 37 | 0 | 10 | 26 |

Mixed Relay

| Athletes | Event | Cross-Country Girls' Race | Cross-Country Boys' Race | Boys' Road Race | Girls' Road Race | Total Time | Rank |
|---|---|---|---|---|---|---|---|
| Natalia Nowotarska; Szymon Sajnok; Damian Slawek; Agata Drozdek | Mixed Team Relay | | | | | 18:20 | 8 |

== Fencing ==
Poland qualified four athletes based on its performance at the 2014 FIE Cadet World Championships.

Boys

| Athlete | Event | Pool Round | Seed | Round of 16 | Quarterfinals | Semifinals | Final / BM | Rank |
| Athlete | Event | Opposition Score | Seed | Opposition Score | Opposition Score | Opposition Score | Opposition Score | Rank |
|---|---|---|---|---|---|---|---|---|
| Andrzej Rządkowski | Foil | Heroui (ALG) Bianchi (ITA) Seo (KOR) C Choi (HKG) M Huang (CHN) El-Choueiri (LIB); W 5-1 | | | | Seo (KOR); W 15-10 | Choi (HKG); W 15-13 | 1st place, gold medalist(s) |

Girls

| Athlete | Event | Pool Round | Seed | Round of 16 | Quarterfinals | Semifinals | Final / BM | Rank |
| Athlete | Event | Opposition Score | Seed | Opposition Score | Opposition Score | Opposition Score | Opposition Score | Rank |
|---|---|---|---|---|---|---|---|---|
| Anna Mroszczak | Épée | Pool 2 Linde (SWE); W Lee (KOR) Gaber (EGY) Nagy (HUN) Alqudah (JOR); W 5-0 | 3 | Bye | de Marchi (ITA); L 10-15 | Did not advance | | 5 |
| Anna Szymczak | Foil | Zhao (CAN) Elsharkawy (EGY) Martyanova (RUS) Choi (HKG) Borella (ITA) Kontochristopoulou (GRE) | | Bye | L | Did not advance | | 5 |
| Sylwia Matuszak | Sabre | Emura (JPN) Köse (TUR) Moseyko (RUS) Gkountoura (GRE) Koutogle (TOG); W 5-0; Ciss (SEN); W 5-3 | | L | Did not advance | | | 9 |

Mixed Team

| Athletes | Event | Round of 16 | Quarterfinals | Semifinals / PM | Final / PM | Rank |
| Athletes | Event | Opposition Score | Opposition Score | Opposition Score | Opposition Score | Rank |
|---|---|---|---|---|---|---|
| Europe 2 Marios Giakoumatos (GRE); Chiara Grovari (ITA); Linus Islas (SWE); Asa Linde (SWE); Enguerand Roger (FRA); Anna Szymczak (POL) | Mixed Team | Bye | Team America 1 (MIX); W 30-24 | Team Asia-Oceania 1 (MIX); L 29-30 | Team Asia-Oceania 2 (MIX); W 30-25 | 3rd place, bronze medalist(s) |
| Europe 1 Patrik Esztergályos (HUN); Marta Martyanova (RUS); Ivan Ilin (RUS); Eleonora De Marchi (ITA); Andrzej Rządkowski (POL); Alina Moseyko (RUS) | Mixed Team | | Team Americas 2 (MIX); W 30-29 | Team Asia-Oceania 2 (MIX); W | Team Asia-Oceania 1 (MIX); L | 2nd place, silver medalist(s) |

== Gymnastics ==
=== Artistic Gymnastics ===
Poland qualified one athlete based on its performance at the 2014 European WAG Championships.

Girls

| Athlete | Event | Apparatus | | | | Total | Rank |
| Athlete | Event | F | V | UB | BB | Total | Rank |
|---|---|---|---|---|---|---|---|
| Wiktoria Łopuszańska | Qualification | DNS | | | | | |

== Judo ==
Poland qualified two athletes based on its performance at the 2013 Cadet World Judo Championships.

Individual

| Athlete | Event | Round of 32 | Round of 16 | Quarterfinals | Semifinals | Rep 1 | Rep 2 | Rep 3 | Rep 4 | Final / BM | Rank |
| Athlete | Event | Opposition Result | Opposition Result | Opposition Result | Opposition Result | Opposition Result | Opposition Result | Opposition Result | Opposition Result | Opposition Result | Rank |
|---|---|---|---|---|---|---|---|---|---|---|---|
| Pawel Wawrzyczek | Boys' -66 kg | — | Sancho (CRC); L 000-010 | Did not advance | | Rebahi (ALG); W 010-000 | Tsend-ochir (MGL); W 100-000 | Gonzalez (VEN); W 000-000 | Wu (CHN); L 000-001 | Did not advance | 7 |
| Kamila Pasternak | Girls' -78 kg | — | Rodríguez (VEN); L 000-110 | Did not advance | | — | Bye | Berger (BEL); W 100-000 | Rodríguez (VEN); L 000-100 | Did not advance | 7 |

Team

| Athletes | Event | Round of 16 | Quarterfinals | Semifinals | Final | Rank |
| Athletes | Event | Opposition Result | Opposition Result | Opposition Result | Opposition Result | Rank |
|---|---|---|---|---|---|---|
| Team Kerr; Sophie Berger (BEL); Karla Lorenzana (GUA); Saliou Ndiaye (SEN); Jennifer Schwille (GER); Oussama Snoussi (TUN); Pawel Wawrzyczek (POL); Bauyrzhan Zhauyntayev (KAZ) | Mixed Team | Team Berghmans (MIX); L 2 - 4 | Did not advance | | | 9 |
| Team Ruska; Sadjia Amrane (ALG); Jose Basile (BRA); Harutyun Dermishyan (ARM); Szabina Gercsák (HUN); Lovro Kovac (CRO); Kamila Pasternak (POL); Julian Sancho (CRC); Betina Temelkova (BUL) | Mixed Team | Bye | Team Rouge (MIX); L 2 – 5 | Did not advance | | 5 |

== Modern Pentathlon ==
Poland qualified one athlete based on its performance at the 2014 Youth A World Championships.

| Athlete | Event | Fencing Ranking Round (épée one touch) | | Swimming (200 m freestyle) | | | Fencing Final round (épée one touch) | | | Combined: Shooting/Running (10 m air pistol)/(3000 m) | | | Total Points | Final Rank |
| Athlete | Event | Results | Rank | Time | Rank | Points | Results | Rank | Points | Time | Rank | Points | Total Points | Final Rank |
|---|---|---|---|---|---|---|---|---|---|---|---|---|---|---|
| Bartosz Hoffmann | Boys' Individual | | | | | | | | | | | | 1003 | 23 |
| Unknown; Bartosz Hoffmann (POL) | Mixed Relay | | | | | | | | | | | | | |

== Rowing ==
Poland qualified two boats based on its performance at the 2013 World Rowing Junior Championships.

| Athlete | Event | Heats | | Repechage | | Semifinals | | Final | |
| Athlete | Event | Time | Rank | Time | Rank | Time | Rank | Time | Rank |
|---|---|---|---|---|---|---|---|---|---|
| Mateusz Swietek | Boys' Single Sculls | 3:29.37 | 3 R | 3:23.41 | 1 SA/B | 3:25.42 | 3 FA | 3:28.31 | 5 |
| Katarzyna Pilch; Karolina Smyrak | Girls' Pairs | 3:34.57 | 4 R | 3:36.13 | 2 FA | — | | 3:46.10 | 6 |

Qualification Legend: FA=Final A (medal); FB=Final B (non-medal); FC=Final C (non-medal); FD=Final D (non-medal); SA/B=Semifinals A/B; SC/D=Semifinals C/D; R=Repechage

== Sailing ==
Poland was given a reallocation boat based on being a top ranked nation not yet qualified.

| Athlete | Event | Race | | | | | | | | | | | Net Points | Final Rank |
| Athlete | Event | 1 | 2 | 3 | 4 | 5 | 6 | 7 | 8 | 9 | 10 | M* | Net Points | Final Rank |
|---|---|---|---|---|---|---|---|---|---|---|---|---|---|---|
| Magdalena Majewska | Girls' Techno 293 | 8 | (16) | 16 | 2 | 15 | 12 | 11 | Cancelled | | | 80.00 | 64.00 | 13 |

== Shooting ==
Poland was given a wild card to compete.

Individual

| Athlete | Event | Qualification | | Final | |
| Athlete | Event | Points | Rank | Points | Rank |
|---|---|---|---|---|---|
| Agata Nowak | Girls' 10m Air Pistol | 372 | 8 Q | 196.9 | 1st place, gold medalist(s) |

Team

| Athletes | Event | Qualification | | Round of 16 | Quarterfinals | Semifinals | Final / BM | Rank |
| Athletes | Event | Points | Rank | Opposition Result | Opposition Result | Opposition Result | Opposition Result | Rank |
|---|---|---|---|---|---|---|---|---|
| Agata Nowak (POL); Dzhafar Shermatov (TJK) | Mixed Team 10m Air Pistol | 740 | 13 Q | A Rasmane (LAT); W Madrid (GUA); L 7 – 10 | Did not advance | | | 17 |

== Swimming ==
Poland qualified four swimmers.

Boys

| Athlete | Event | Heat | | Semifinal | | Final | |
| Athlete | Event | Time | Rank | Time | Rank | Time | Rank |
|---|---|---|---|---|---|---|---|
| Jan Hołub | 50 m freestyle | 22.98Q | 5 | 22.74Q | 4 | 22.70 | 5 |
| Jan Hołub | 100 m freestyle | 50.61 | 8 Q | 50.41 | 7 Q | 50.01 | 7 |
| Wojciech Wojdak | 200 m freestyle | 1:53.02 | 19 | — | | Did not advance | |
| Wojciech Wojdak | 400 m freestyle | 3:52.80 | 2 Q | — | | 3:53.96 | 6 |
| Wojciech Wojdak | 800 m freestyle | — | | | | 8:02.38 | 4 |

Girls

| Athlete | Event | Heat | | Semifinal | | Final | |
| Athlete | Event | Time | Rank | Time | Rank | Time | Rank |
|---|---|---|---|---|---|---|---|
| Nikola Petryka | 50 m freestyle | 26.70 | 18 | Did not advance | | | |
| Nikola Petryka | 100 m freestyle | 57.67 | 20 | Did not advance | | | |
| Nikola Petryka | 50 m backstroke | 29.76 | 14 Q | 29.83 | 15 | Did not advance | |
| Dominika Sztandera | 50 m freestyle | 26.78 | 21 | Did not advance | | | |
| Dominika Sztandera | 50 m breaststroke | 32.19 | 5 Q | 32.29 | 9 | Did not advance | |
| Dominika Sztandera | 100 m breaststroke | 1:10.73 | 10 Q | 1:10.43 | 9 | Did not advance | |

== Table Tennis ==
Poland qualified two athletes based on its performance at the European Qualification Event.

Singles

| Athlete | Event | Group stage | Rank | Round of 16 | Quarterfinals | Semifinals | Final / BM | Rank |
| Athlete | Event | Opposition Score | Rank | Opposition Score | Opposition Score | Opposition Score | Opposition Score | Rank |
|---|---|---|---|---|---|---|---|---|
| Patryk Zatowka | Boys | Group F Reitspies (CZE); W 3 - 2 | 1 Q | Pucar (CRO); W 4 - 2 | Calderano (BRA); L 3 - 4 | Did not advance | | 5 |
| Patryk Zatowka | Boys | Levenko (AUT); W 3 - 2 | 1 Q | Pucar (CRO); W 4 - 2 | Calderano (BRA); L 3 - 4 | Did not advance | | 5 |
| Patryk Zatowka | Boys | Ben Yahia (TUN); W 3 - 1 | 1 Q | Pucar (CRO); W 4 - 2 | Calderano (BRA); L 3 - 4 | Did not advance | | 5 |
| Natalia Bajor | Girls | Group F Edghill (GUY); W 3 - 0 | 3 qB | Consolation; Bui (AUS); L 1 - 3 | Did not advance | | | 21 |
| Natalia Bajor | Girls | Rakovac (CRO); L 0 - 3 | 3 qB | Consolation; Bui (AUS); L 1 - 3 | Did not advance | | | 21 |
| Natalia Bajor | Girls | Mischek (AUT); W 3 - 1 | 3 qB | Consolation; Bui (AUS); L 1 - 3 | Did not advance | | | 21 |

Team

| Athletes | Event | Group stage | Rank | Round of 16 | Quarterfinals | Semifinals | Final / BM | Rank |
| Athletes | Event | Opposition Score | Rank | Opposition Score | Opposition Score | Opposition Score | Opposition Score | Rank |
|---|---|---|---|---|---|---|---|---|
| Poland; Natalia Bajor (POL); Patryk Zatowka (POL) | Mixed | Group A China; Liu (CHN); Fan (CHN); L 0 - 3 | 2 Q | Hong Kong; Hung (HKG); Doo (HKG); L 0 - 2 | Did not advance | | | 9 |
| Poland; Natalia Bajor (POL); Patryk Zatowka (POL) | Mixed | Asia 1 Kim (UZB); Al-Naggar (QAT); W 3 - 0 | 2 Q | Hong Kong; Hung (HKG); Doo (HKG); L 0 - 2 | Did not advance | | | 9 |
| Poland; Natalia Bajor (POL); Patryk Zatowka (POL) | Mixed | Latin America 2 Arvelo (VEN); Tenti (ARG); W 2 - 1 | 2 Q | Hong Kong; Hung (HKG); Doo (HKG); L 0 - 2 | Did not advance | | | 9 |

Qualification Legend: Q=Main Bracket (medal); qB=Consolation Bracket (non-medal)

== Taekwondo ==
Poland qualified one athlete based on its performance at the Taekwondo Qualification Tournament.

Girls

| Athlete | Event | Round of 16 | Quarterfinals | Semifinals | Final | Rank |
| Athlete | Event | Opposition Result | Opposition Result | Opposition Result | Opposition Result | Rank |
|---|---|---|---|---|---|---|
| Patrycja Adamkiewicz | −49 kg | Bye | Craen (BEL); L 9 - 14 | Did not advance | | 5 |

== Tennis ==
Poland qualified two athletes based on the 9 June 2014 ITF World Junior Rankings.

Singles

| Athlete | Event | Round of 32 | Round of 16 | Quarterfinals | Semifinals | Final / BM | Rank |
| Athlete | Event | Opposition Score | Opposition Score | Opposition Score | Opposition Score | Opposition Score | Rank |
|---|---|---|---|---|---|---|---|
| Kamil Majchrzak | Boys' Singles | Polmans (AUS); W 2–0 (6–3, 6–2) | Harris (RSA); W 2–0 (6–2, 6–0) | Lee (KOR); W 1–1 (3–6, 6–4, retired) | Rublev (RUS); W 2–1 (6–4, 3–6, 6–3) | Luz (BRA); W 2–0 (7–5, 6–4) | 1st place, gold medalist(s) |
| Jan Zieliński | Boys' Singles | Molčan (SVK); W 2–1 (4–6, 6–3, 6–2) | Yamasaki (JPN); L 1–2 (7–5, 1–6, 2–6) | Did not advance | | | 9 |

Doubles

| Athletes | Event | Round of 32 | Round of 16 | Quarterfinals | Semifinals | Final / BM | Rank |
| Athletes | Event | Opposition Score | Opposition Score | Opposition Score | Opposition Score | Opposition Score | Rank |
|---|---|---|---|---|---|---|---|
| Kamil Majchrzak (POL); Jan Zieliński (POL) | Boys' Doubles | — | Harris (RSA); Iradukunda (BDI); W 2–0 (6–1, 6–4) | Chung (KOR); Lee (KOR); W walkover | Khachanov (RUS); Rublev (RUS); L 1–2 (6–4, 3–6, 8–10) | Matsumura (JPN); Yamasaki (JPN); L 1–2 (4–6, 6–0, 4–10) | 4 |
| Fanni Stollár (HUN); Kamil Majchrzak (POL) | Mixed Doubles | Bains (AUS); Polmans (AUS); W 2–1 (4–6, 6–3, 11–9) | Ostapenko (LAT); Appelgren (SWE); W 2–1 (6–2, 0–6, 10–6) | Giangreco Campiz (PAR); Zormann (BRA); W 2–0 (7–5, 6–2) | Ye (CHN); Yamasaki (JPN); L 0–2 (6–7, 4–6) | Ducu (ROU); Zukas (ARG); W 2–1 (6–3, 3–6, 10–5) | 3rd place, bronze medalist(s) |
| Jil Teichmann (SUI); Jan Zieliński (POL) | Mixed Doubles | Hon (AUS); Bourchier (AUS); W 2–0 (6–3, 6–4) | Minnen (BEL); Geens (BEL); W 2–0 (7–6, 6–3) | Heinová (CZE); Carey (BAH); W 2–0 (6–3, 6–3) | Ducu (ROU); Zukas (ARG); W 2–0 (6–2, 6–1) | Ye (CHN); Yamasaki (JPN); W 2–1 (4–6, 6–3, 10–4) | 1st place, gold medalist(s) |

== Weightlifting ==
Poland qualified 1 quota in the boys' events and 1 quota in the girls' events based on the team ranking after the 2013 Weightlifting Youth World Championships.

Boys

| Athlete | Event | Snatch | | Clean & jerk | | Total | Rank |
| Athlete | Event | Result | Rank | Result | Rank | Total | Rank |
|---|---|---|---|---|---|---|---|
| Pawel Brylak | −62 kg | 109 | 5 | 141 | 3 | 250 | 5 |

Girls

| Athlete | Event | Snatch | | Clean & jerk | | Total | Rank |
| Athlete | Event | Result | Rank | Result | Rank | Total | Rank |
|---|---|---|---|---|---|---|---|
| Kinga Kaczmarczyk | +63 kg | 94 | 6 | 110 | 7 | 204 | 6 |

== Wrestling ==
Poland qualified one athlete based on its performance at the 2014 European Cadet Championships.

Key:

- VT - Victory by Fall.
- PP - Decision by Points - the loser with technical points.
- PO - Decision by Points - the loser without technical points.

Girls

| Athlete | Event | Group stage | | | | Final / RM | Rank |
| Athlete | Event | Opposition Score | Opposition Score | Opposition Score | Rank | Opposition Score | Rank |
|---|---|---|---|---|---|---|---|
| Natalia Strzalka | Freestyle -70kg | Duisenova (KAZ); W | Ayovi (ECU); W | Shisterova (RUS); L 0 - 4 ^{VT} | 2 Q | Park (KOR); W 3 - 1 ^{VT} | 3rd place, bronze medalist(s) |
