= Tennis at the Summer Youth Olympics =

- Governing body: ITF
- Events: 5 (men: 2; womens: 2; mixed: 1)

Games
- 2010; 2014; 2018

Tennis was inducted at the Youth Olympic Games at the inaugural edition in 2010. The program included four competitions: Boys' singles, Boys' doubles, Girls' singles and Girls' doubles. The 2014 edition added a Mixed doubles event. Players from different National Olympic Committees are allowed to participate in doubles events.

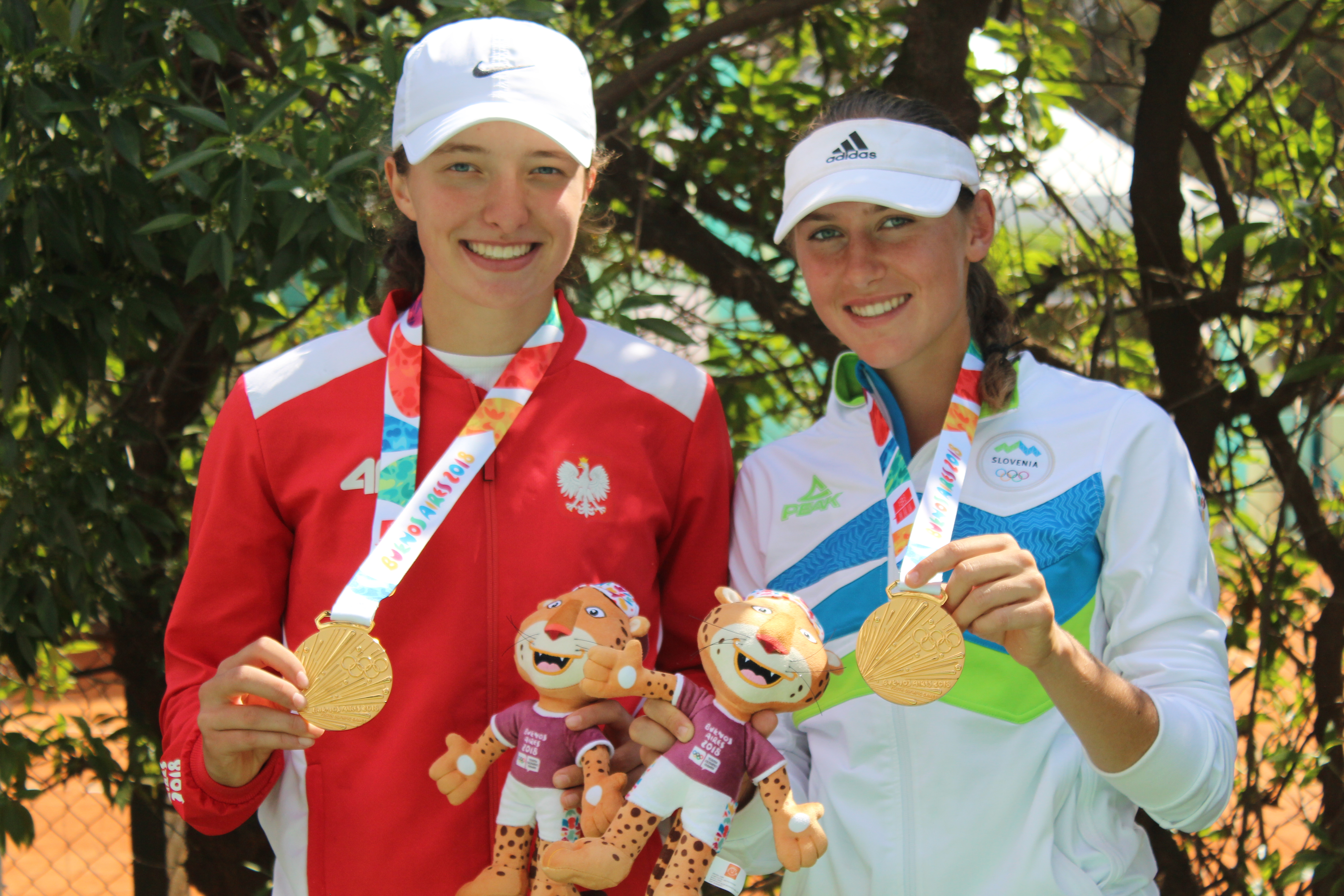
Iga Świątek (left) and Kaja Juvan, the 2018 Summer Youth Olympics gold medallists in girls' doubles

== Medal table ==
As of the 2018 Summer Youth Olympics.

Rank	Nation	Gold	Silver	Bronze	Total
–	Mixed-NOCs	4	2	3	9
1	China	2	1	1	4
2	Russia	1	3	1	5
3	France	1	1	2	4
4	Brazil	1	1	1	3
4	Colombia	1	1	1	3
4	Japan	1	1	1	3
7	Argentina	1	1	0	2
8	Poland	1	0	0	1
8	Slovenia	1	0	0	1
10	Slovakia	0	1	2	3
11	Belarus	0	1	0	1
11	India	0	1	0	1
13	Bosnia and Herzegovina	0	0	1	1
13	Lithuania	0	0	1	1
Totals (14 entries)		14	14	14	42

== Results ==
=== Current events ===
==== Boys' singles ====
Games	Gold	Silver	Bronze
2010 Singapore	Juan Sebastián Gómez; Colombia	Yuki Bhambri; India	Damir Džumhur; Bosnia and Herzegovina
2014 Nanjing	Kamil Majchrzak; Poland	Orlando Luz; Brazil	Andrey Rublev; Russia
2018 Buenos Aires	Hugo Gaston; France	Facundo Díaz Acosta; Argentina	Gilbert Soares Klier Júnior; Brazil

==== Boys' doubles ====
Games	Gold	Silver	Bronze
2010 Singapore	Oliver Golding; Great Britain; Jiří Veselý; Czech Republic	Victor Baluda; Russia; Mikhail Biryukov; Russia	Filip Horanský; Slovakia; Jozef Kovalík; Slovakia
2014 Nanjing	Orlando Luz; Brazil; Marcelo Zormann; Brazil	Karen Khachanov; Russia; Andrey Rublev; Russia	Ryotaro Matsumura; Japan; Jumpei Yamasaki; Japan
2018 Buenos Aires	Sebastián Báez; Argentina; Facundo Díaz Acosta; Argentina	Adrian Andreev; Bulgaria; Rinky Hijikata; Australia	Hugo Gaston; France; Clément Tabur; France

==== Girls' singles ====
Games	Gold	Silver	Bronze
2010 Singapore	Daria Gavrilova; Russia	Zheng Saisai; China	Jana Čepelová; Slovakia
2014 Nanjing	Xu Shilin; China	Iryna Shymanovich; Belarus	Akvilė Paražinskaitė; Lithuania
2018 Buenos Aires	Kaja Juvan; Slovenia	Clara Burel; France	Camila Osorio; Colombia

==== Girls' doubles ====
Games	Gold	Silver	Bronze
2010 Singapore	Tang Haochen; China; Zheng Saisai; China	Jana Čepelová; Slovakia; Chantal Škamlová; Slovakia	Tímea Babos; Hungary; An-Sophie Mestach; Belgium
2014 Nanjing	Anhelina Kalinina; Ukraine; Iryna Shymanovich; Belarus	Darya Kasatkina; Russia; Anastasiya Komardina; Russia	Jeļena Ostapenko; Latvia; Akvilė Paražinskaitė; Lithuania
2018 Buenos Aires	Kaja Juvan; Slovenia; Iga Świątek; Poland	Yuki Naito; Japan; Naho Sato; Japan	Wang Xinyu; China; Wang Xiyu; China

==== Mixed doubles ====
Games	Gold	Silver	Bronze
2014 Nanjing	Jil Teichmann; Switzerland; Jan Zieliński; Poland	Ye Qiuyu; China; Jumpei Yamasaki; Japan	Fanni Stollár; Hungary; Kamil Majchrzak; Poland
2018 Buenos Aires	Yuki Naito; Japan; Naoki Tajima; Japan	Camila Osorio; Colombia; Nicolás Mejía; Colombia	Clara Burel; France; Hugo Gaston; France

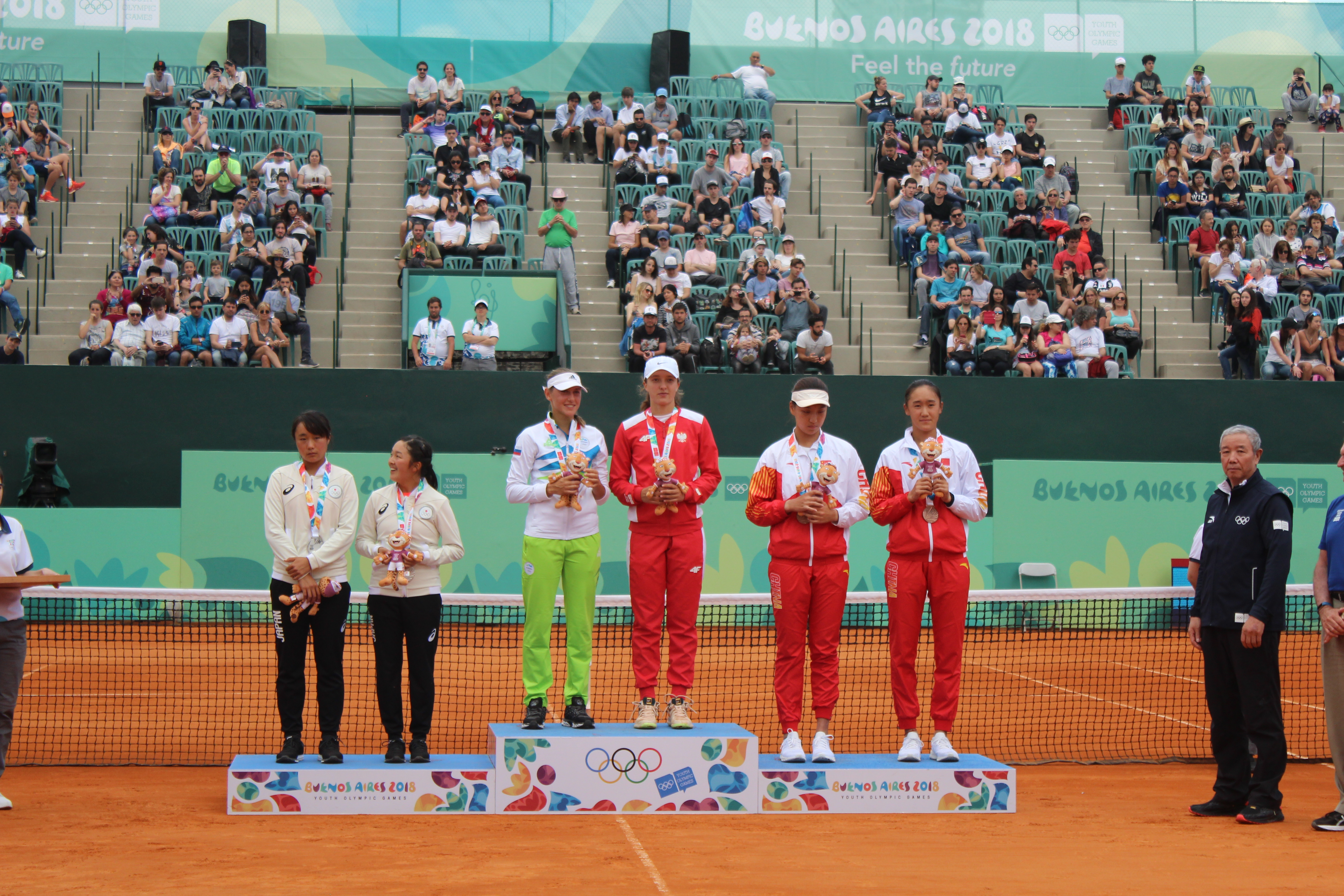
Girls doubles podium of the 2018 Summer Youth Olympics.

== See also ==
- Tennis at the Summer Olympics
