= Slovakia at the 2014 Summer Youth Olympics =

- IOC code: SVK
- NOC: Slovak Olympic and Sports Committee
- Website: www.olympic.sk

in Nanjing 16 – 28 August 2014
- Competitors: 38 in 11 sports
- Flag bearer: Jakub Grigar
- Medals Ranked 58th: Gold 0 Silver 2 Bronze 1 Total 3

Summer Youth Olympics appearances (overview)
- 2010; 2014; 2018; 2026

Slovakia competed at the 2014 Summer Youth Olympics, in Nanjing, China from 16 August to 28 August 2014.

== Medalists ==
Medal	Name	Sport	Event	Date
Silver	Michaela Peskova	Athletics	Girls' 400 m hurdles	25 Aug
Silver	Jakub Grigar	Canoeing	Boys' Obstacle Canoe Slalom K1	27 Aug
Bronze	Marko Mirgorodský	Canoeing	Boys' Obstacle Canoe Slalom C1	27 Aug

== Archery ==
Slovakia qualified a male archer from its performance at the 2013 World Archery Youth Championships.

Individual

Athlete	Event	Ranking round		Round of 32	Round of 16	Quarterfinals	Semifinals	Final / BM	Rank
Athlete	Event	Score	Seed	Opposition Score	Opposition Score	Opposition Score	Opposition Score	Opposition Score	Rank
Boris Balaz	Boys' Individual	661	16	Zolkepeli (MAS); L 2–6	Did not advance				17

Team

Athletes	Event	Ranking round		Round of 32	Round of 16	Quarterfinals	Semifinals	Final / BM	Rank
Athletes	Event	Score	Seed	Opposition Score	Opposition Score	Opposition Score	Opposition Score	Opposition Score	Rank
Boris Balaz (SVK); Verona Villegas (VEN)	Mixed Team	1289	8	Oleksiuk (UKR); Reddig (NAM); W 6–0	Jiaman (CHN); Moreno (PHI); L 2–4	Did not advance			9

== Athletics ==
Slovakia qualified three athletes.

Qualification Legend: Q=Final A (medal); qB=Final B (non-medal); qC=Final C (non-medal); qD=Final D (non-medal); qE=Final E (non-medal)

Boys
Field Events

Athlete	Event	Qualification		Final	
Athlete	Event	Distance	Rank	Distance	Rank
Pavol Ženčár	Discus throw	59.64	3 Q	NM	

Girls
Track & road events

Athlete	Event	Heats		Final	
Athlete	Event	Result	Rank	Result	Rank
Michaela Pešková	400 m hurdles	59.44	1 Q	58.26	2nd place, silver medalist(s)

Field events

Athlete	Event	Qualification		Final	
Athlete	Event	Distance	Rank	Distance	Rank
Patrícia Slošárová	Shot put	14.88	11 qB	15.11	2

== Boxing ==
Slovakia qualified one boxer based on its performance at the 2014 AIBA Youth World Championships

Boys

Athlete	Event	Preliminaries	Semifinals	Final / RM	Rank
Athlete	Event	Opposition Result	Opposition Result	Opposition Result	Rank
Michal Takacs	-56 kg	McGrail (GBR); L 1–2	Did not advance	Bout for 5th place Said (TUN); W 2–1	5

== Canoeing ==
Slovakia qualified three boats based on its performance at the 2013 World Junior Canoe Sprint and Slalom Championships.

Boys

Athlete	Event	Qualification		Repechage		Round of 16		Quarterfinals	Semifinals	Final / BM	Rank
Athlete	Event	Time	Rank	Time	Rank	Time	Rank	Opposition Result	Opposition Result	Opposition Result	Rank
Marko Mirgorodský	C1 slalom	1:16.530	2 Q	—N/a				Vasile (ROU); W 1:20.345	Roisin (FRA); L 1:19.784	Breznik (SLO); W 1:18.587	3rd place, bronze medalist(s)
Marko Mirgorodský	C1 sprint	3:36.002	15 Q	—N/a		3:12.814	13	Did not advance			13
Jakub Grigar	K1 slalom	1:08.066	2 Q	—N/a		1:05.660	1 Q	Thompson (AUS); W 1:08.584	Huang (CHN); W 1:07.997	Urankar (SLO); L 1:11.129	2nd place, silver medalist(s)
Jakub Grigar	K1 sprint	1:56.279	17 R	1:54.937	9	Did not advance					

Girls

Athlete	Event	Qualification		Repechage		Round of 16		Quarterfinals	Semifinals	Final / BM	Rank
Athlete	Event	Time	Rank	Time	Rank	Time	Rank	Opposition Result	Opposition Result	Opposition Result	Rank
Michaela Hassova	K1 slalom	1:20.057	6 Q	—N/a		1:18.698	5 Q	Yan (CHN); L 1:19.912	Did not advance		
Michaela Hassova	K1 sprint	2:22.752	15 R	2:19.756	7 Q	2:23.030	16	Did not advance			16

== Cycling ==
Slovakia qualified a girls' team based on its ranking issued by the UCI.

Team

Athletes	Event	Cross-Country Eliminator		Time Trial			BMX		Cross-Country Race			Road Race			Total Pts	Rank
Athletes	Event	Rank	Points	Time	Rank	Points	Rank	Points	Time	Rank	Points	Time	Rank	Points	Total Pts	Rank
Nina Janusikova; Tereza Medveďová	Girls' Team	13	4	5:57.95	2	80	19	0	48:18	8	20	1:27:51; 1:12:36	50; 13	4	108	11

Mixed Relay

Athletes	Event	Cross-Country Girls' Race	Cross-Country Boys' Race	Boys' Road Race	Girls' Road Race	Total Time	Rank
Nina Janusikova (SVK); Zahir Figueroa (BIZ); Delawn Abraham (BIZ); Tereza Medvenova (SVK)	Mixed Team Relay					19:47	21

== Football ==
Slovakia will compete in the girls' tournament.

=== Girls' Tournament ===
Roster

- Tamara Solárová
- Simona Čerkalová
- Nikola Vagaská
- Kristína Hrádeľová
- Lenka Kopčová
- Martina Šurnovská
- Alexandra Štrúbelová
- Timea Bochinová
- Mária Mikolajová
- Veronika Jančová
- Laura Suchá
- Denisa Mochnacká
- Tamara Gmitterová
- Katarína Májovská
- Denisa Mráziková
- Bianka Brúniková
- Andrea Herbríková
- Barbara Rigó

Group stage

Team	Pld	W	D	L	GF	GA	GD	Pts
Venezuela	2	2	0	0	13	2	+11	6
Slovakia	2	1	0	1	6	6	0	3
Papua New Guinea	2	0	0	2	0	11	−11	0

17 August 2014
18:00

Venezuela	6–2	Slovakia
Deyna Castellanos 10', 13', 33'; Nathalie Pasquel 45', 72'; Yuleisi Rivero 61'	Report	Martina Surnovska 40', 58'

Wutaishan Stadium, Nanjing
Attendance: 4,503
Referee: Christina Unkel (United States)

20 August 2014
18:00

Slovakia	4–0	Papua New Guinea
Laura Sucha 11'; Martina Surnovska 35', 54'; Veronika Jancova 68'	Report

Wutaishan Stadium, Nanjing
Attendance: 4,350
Referee: Gladys Lengwe (Zambia)

Semi-final

23 August 2014
20:45

China	0–0	Slovakia
	Report
Penalties
Zhao Yujie (penalty scored); Ma Xiaolan (penalty scored); Zhang Jiayun (penalty scored); Fang Jie (penalty scored)	4–2	(penalty missed) Martina Surnovska; (penalty missed) Tamara Gmitterova; (penalty scored) Maria Mikolajova; (penalty scored) Veronika Jancova

Wutaishan Stadium, Nanjing
Attendance: 4,690
Referee: Marilin Miranda (Paraguay)

Bronze medal match

26 August 2014
18:00

Mexico	3–1	Slovakia
Andrea Herbrikova 10' (o.g.); Montserrat Hernandez 15'; Daniela Garcia 79'	Report	Diana Anguiano 43' (o.g.)

Wutaishan Stadium, Nanjing
Attendance: 11,678
Referee: Anna-Marie Keighley (New Zealand)

== Gymnastics ==
=== Artistic Gymnastics ===
Slovakia qualified one athlete based on its performance at the 2014 European MAG Championships.

Boys

Athlete	Event	Qualification								Final							
Athlete	Event	Apparatus						Total	Rank	Apparatus						Total	Rank
Athlete	Event	F	PH	R	V	PB	HB	Total	Rank	F	PH	R	V	PB	HB	Total	Rank
Igor Takac	All-around	12.950	13.100	13.200	12.550	12.500	12.950	77.250	15 Q	13.150	12.800	13.050	12.800	13.550	12.900	78.250	11

== Sailing ==
Slovakia was given a reallocation boat based on being a top ranked nation not yet qualified.

Athlete	Event	Race											Net Points	Final Rank
Athlete	Event	1	2	3	4	5	6	7	8	9	10	M*	Net Points	Final Rank
Martin Beranek	Boys' Techno 293	20	18	20	20	20	19	CAN				19	116	20

== Shooting ==
Slovakia was given a wild card to compete.

Individual

Athlete	Event	Qualification		Final	
Athlete	Event	Points	Rank	Points	Rank
Samuela Ernstova	Girls' 10m Air Pistol	356	19	Did not advance	

Team

Athletes	Event	Qualification		Round of 16	Quarterfinals	Semifinals	Final / BM	Rank
Athletes	Event	Points	Rank	Opposition Result	Opposition Result	Opposition Result	Opposition Result	Rank
Samuela Ernstova (SVK); Kim Cheongyong (KOR)	Mixed Team 10m Air Pistol							

== Swimming ==
Slovakia qualified three swimmers.

Boys

Athlete	Event	Heat		Semifinal		Final	
Athlete	Event	Time	Rank	Time	Rank	Time	Rank
Tomas Puchly	50 m freestyle	23.42	14 Q	23.43	16	Did not advance	
Tomas Puchly	100 m butterfly	56.11	17	Did not advance			

Girls

Athlete	Event	Heat		Semifinal		Final	
Athlete	Event	Time	Rank	Time	Rank	Time	Rank
Barbora Misendova	50 m freestyle	26.25	9 Q	26.05	11	Did not advance	
Barbora Misendova	50 m butterfly	27.29	8 Q	27.17	8 Q	26.95	7
Karolina Hajkova	50 m backstroke	29.99	20	Did not advance			
Karolina Hajkova	100 m backstroke	1:03.29	14 Q	1:03.56	16	Did not advance	

== Tennis ==
Slovakia qualified three athletes based on the 9 June 2014 ITF World Junior Rankings.

Singles

Athlete	Event	Round of 32	Round of 16	Quarterfinals	Semifinals	Final / BM	Rank
Athlete	Event	Opposition Score	Opposition Score	Opposition Score	Opposition Score	Opposition Score	Rank
Martin Blaško	Boys' Singles	Iradukunda (BDI); W 6–3, 6–3	Rublev (RUS); L 7–5, 2–6, 2–6	Did not advance			
Alex Molčan	Boys' Singles	Zieliński (POL); L 6–4, 3–6, 2–6	Did not advance				
Viktória Kužmová	Girls' Singles	Ostapenko (LAT); L 6–3, 0–6, 2–6	Did not advance				
Kristína Schmiedlová	Girls' Singles	Hon (AUS); W 6–3, 6–2	Kim D (KOR); W 6–2, 1–1^{r}	Xu S (CHN); L 1–6, 1–6	Did not advance		

Doubles

Athletes	Event	Round of 32	Round of 16	Quarterfinals	Semifinals	Final / BM	Rank
Athletes	Event	Opposition Score	Opposition Score	Opposition Score	Opposition Score	Opposition Score	Rank
Martin Blaško (SVK); Alex Molčan (SVK)	Boys' Doubles	—N/a	Chung Y-s / Lee D-h (KOR); L 3–6, 3–6	Did not advance			
Viktória Kužmová (SVK); Kristína Schmiedlová (SVK)	Girls' Doubles	—N/a	Bondár / Stollár (HUN); L 6–3, 3–6, 5–11	Did not advance			
Kristína Schmiedlová (SVK); Alex Molčan (SVK)	Mixed doubles	Kasatkina / Rublev (RUS); L 2–6, 4–6	Did not advance				
Viktória Kužmová (SVK); Martin Blaško (SVK)	Mixed doubles	González (ECU) / Rosas (PER); W 7–5, 6–2	Komardina / Khachanov (RUS); L 3–6, 1–6	Did not advance			
