= Montenegro at the 2014 Summer Youth Olympics =

- IOC code: MNE
- NOC: Montenegrin Olympic Committee
- Website: www.cokcg.org

in Nanjing
- Competitors: 5 in 4 sports
- Medals: Gold 0 Silver 0 Bronze 0 Total 0

Summer Youth Olympics appearances
- 2010; 2014; 2018

Montenegro competed at the 2014 Summer Youth Olympics, in Nanjing, China from 16 August to 28 August 2014.

== Medalists ==
Medals awarded to participants of mixed-NOC (Combined) teams are represented in italics. These medals are not counted towards the individual NOC medal tally.

Medal	Name	Sport	Event	Date
Silver	Ivana Sunjević	Judo	Mixed Team	21 Aug

== Athletics ==
Montenegro qualified one athlete.

Qualification Legend: Q=Final A (medal); qB=Final B (non-medal); qC=Final C (non-medal); qD=Final D (non-medal); qE=Final E (non-medal)

Girls
Field events

Athlete	Event	Qualification		Final	
Athlete	Event	Distance	Rank	Distance	Rank
Kristina Rakočević	Discus throw	47.28	4 Q	47.55	4

== Judo ==
Montenegro qualified two athletes based on its performance at the 2013 Cadet World Judo Championships.

Individual

Athlete	Event	Round of 32	Round of 16	Quarterfinals	Semifinals	Rep 1	Rep 2	Rep 3	Rep 4	Final / BM	Rank
Athlete	Event	Opposition Result	Opposition Result	Opposition Result	Opposition Result	Opposition Result	Opposition Result	Opposition Result	Opposition Result	Opposition Result	Rank
Arso Milić	Boys' -81 kg	Bye	Kussik (EST); W 0103 – 0002	Igolinikov (RUS); L 0000 – 1000	Did not advance	Bye		Snoussi (TUN); W 0002 – 0001	Krieber (CAN); W 1000 – 0000	de Wit (NED); L 0000 – 1000	5
Ivana Sunjević	Girls' -63 kg	—N/a	Klimkait (CAN); L 0000 – 0023	Did not advance		Szarzecova (CZE); W 1011 – 0110	Drozdova (UKR); W 1010 – 0001	Schwille (GER); L 0002 – 0110	—N/a	Did not advance	7

Team

Athletes	Event	Round of 16	Quarterfinals	Semifinals	Final	Rank
Athletes	Event	Opposition Result	Opposition Result	Opposition Result	Opposition Result	Rank
Team Kano; Melisa Çakmaklı (TUR); Salim Darukhi (TJK); Mariam Janashvili (GEO); Arso Milic (MNE); Gavin Mogopa (BOT); Elvismar Rodriguez (VEN); Stoyan Tarapanov (BUL); Tea Tintor (SRB)	Mixed Team	Team Rouge (MIX); L 2 – 5	Did not advance			9
Team Geesink; Layana Colman (BRA); Nemanja Majdov (SRB); Dzmitry Minkou (BLR); Ryu Seunghwan (KOR); Ivana Sunjevic (MNE); Anastasya Turcheva (RUS); Yu-Jyun Wang (TPE)	Mixed Team	Team Chochishvili (MIX); W 4 – 3	Team Van De Walle (MIX); W 4 – 3	Team Douillet (MIX); W 3^{202} – 3^{111}	Team Rouge (MIX); L 2 – 4	2nd place, silver medalist(s)

== Taekwondo ==
Montenegro was given a wild card to compete.

Boys

Athlete	Event	Round of 16	Quarterfinals	Semifinals	Final	Rank
Athlete	Event	Opposition Result	Opposition Result	Opposition Result	Opposition Result	Rank
Mario Gegaj	+73 kg	J Liu (CHN); L 4 – 12	Did not advance			9

== Tennis ==
Montenegro was given a quota to compete by the tripartite committee.

Singles

Athlete	Event	Round of 32	Round of 16	Quarterfinals	Semifinals	Final / BM	Rank
Athlete	Event	Opposition Score	Opposition Score	Opposition Score	Opposition Score	Opposition Score	Rank
Pavle Rogan	Boys' Singles	J Yamasaki (JPN); L 1 – 6, 3 – 6	Did not advance				

Doubles

Athletes	Event	Round of 32	Round of 16	Quarterfinals	Semifinals	Final / BM	Rank
Athletes	Event	Opposition Score	Opposition Score	Opposition Score	Opposition Score	Opposition Score	Rank
Pavle Rogan (MNE); Sharmal Dissanayake (SRI)	Boys' Doubles	—N/a	N Álvarez (PER); JJ Rosas (PER); L 2 – 6, 3 – 6	Did not advance			
Anhelina Kalinina (UKR); Pavle Rogan (MNE)	Mixed Doubles	S Samir (EGY); L Harris (RSA); L 2 – 6, 4 – 6	Did not advance				
