= Latvia at the 2014 Summer Youth Olympics =

- IOC code: LAT
- NOC: Latvian Olympic Committee
- Website: www.olimpiade.lv

in Nanjing
- Competitors: 13 in 8 sports
- Medals Ranked 80th: Gold 0 Silver 0 Bronze 1 Total 1

Summer Youth Olympics appearances
- 2010; 2014; 2018

Latvia competed at the 2014 Summer Youth Olympics, in Nanjing, China from 16 August to 28 August 2014.

== Medalists ==
Medal	Name	Sport	Event	Date
Bronze	Rebeka Koha	Weightlifting	Girls' 48 kg	17 August

== Athletics ==
Latvia qualified four athletes.

Qualification Legend: Q=Final A (medal); qB=Final B (non-medal); qC=Final C (non-medal); qD=Final D (non-medal); qE=Final E (non-medal)

Boys
Track & road events

Athlete	Event	Final	
Athlete	Event	Result	Rank
Arturs Makars	10 km walk	46:29.07	8

Field Events

Athlete	Event	Qualification		Final	
Athlete	Event	Distance	Rank	Distance	Rank
Jazeps Groza	Javelin throw	66.36	13 qB	70.31	9

Girls
Field events

Athlete	Event	Qualification		Final	
Athlete	Event	Distance	Rank	Distance	Rank
Julija Tarvide	High jump	1.74	11qB	1.73	13
Laine Donane	Javelin throw	48.94	8 Q	51.90	4

== Beach Volleyball ==
Latvia qualified a team by being the highest ranked nation not yet qualified.

Athletes	Event	Preliminary round	Standing	Round of 24	Round of 16	Quarterfinals	Semifinals	Final / BM	Rank
Athletes	Event	Opposition Score	Standing	Opposition Score	Opposition Score	Opposition Score	Opposition Score	Opposition Score	Rank
Tina Graudina; Anastasija Kravčenoka	Girls'	Lassyuta – Pimenova (KAZ); W 2-0 (21-12, 21-8)	2 Q	Bye	Muno – Caputo (USA); L 1-2 (14-21, 21-19, 13-15)	did not advance			17
Tina Graudina; Anastasija Kravčenoka	Girls'	Pacheco – Ocampo (ECU); W 2-0 (21-16, 21-18)	2 Q	Bye	Muno – Caputo (USA); L 1-2 (14-21, 21-19, 13-15)	did not advance			17
Tina Graudina; Anastasija Kravčenoka	Girls'	M. McNamara – N. McNamara (CAN); L 1-2 (19-21, 21-14, 9-15)	2 Q	Bye	Muno – Caputo (USA); L 1-2 (14-21, 21-19, 13-15)	did not advance			17
Tina Graudina; Anastasija Kravčenoka	Girls'	Enzo – Lantignotti (ITA); W 2-0 (21-15, 21-17)	2 Q	Bye	Muno – Caputo (USA); L 1-2 (14-21, 21-19, 13-15)	did not advance			17
Tina Graudina; Anastasija Kravčenoka	Girls'	Seebach – Palmhert (NAM); W 2-0 (21-9, 21-10)	2 Q	Bye	Muno – Caputo (USA); L 1-2 (14-21, 21-19, 13-15)	did not advance			17

== Modern Pentathlon ==
Latvia qualified one athlete based on the 1 June 2014 Olympic Youth A Pentathlon World Rankings.

Athlete	Event	Fencing Ranking Round (épée one touch)		Swimming (200 m freestyle)			Fencing Final Round (épée one touch)			Combined: Shooting/Running (10 m air pistol)/(3000 m)			Total Points	Final Rank
Athlete	Event	Results	Rank	Time	Rank	Points	Results	Rank	Points	Time	Rank	Points	Total Points	Final Rank
Nikita Bistrovs	Boys' Individual	218	11	2:07.63	13	318		255	11	12:36.00	9	544	1117	8
Nikita Bistrovs (LAT); Kali Sayers (CAN)	Mixed Relay	200	14	1:03.56; 0:56.73 (2:00.29)	4	340		267	17	13:49.26	24	471	1078	22

== Sailing ==
Latvia was given a reallocation boat based on being a top ranked nation not yet qualified.

Athlete	Event	Race											Net Points	Final Rank
Athlete	Event	1	2	3	4	5	6	7	8	9	10	M*	Net Points	Final Rank
Ketija Birzule	Girls' Techno 293	(16)	11	13	15	10	4	7	Cancelled			76.00	60.00	12

== Shooting ==
Latvia qualified one shooter based on its performance at the 2014 European Shooting Championships.

Individual

Athlete	Event	Qualification		Final	
Athlete	Event	Points	Rank	Points	Rank
Agate Rašmane	Girls' 10m Air Pistol	370	10	did not advance	

Team

Athletes	Event	Qualification		Round of 16	Quarterfinals	Semifinals	Final / BM	Rank
Athletes	Event	Points	Rank	Opposition Result	Opposition Result	Opposition Result	Opposition Result	Rank
Agate Rašmane (LAT); Wilmar Madrid (GUA)	Mixed Team 10m Air Pistol	753	4 Q	Nowak (POL) / Shermatov (TJK); W 10-7	Elhodhod (EGY) / Akhundov (AZE); W 10-6	Teh (SIN) / Mohamed (EGY); L 9-10	Chung (TPE) / Igitiyan (ARM); W 10-8	3rd place, bronze medalist(s)

== Swimming ==
Latvia qualified two swimmers.

Boys

Athlete	Event	Heat		Semifinal		Final	
Athlete	Event	Time	Rank	Time	Rank	Time	Rank
Janis Saltans	50 m freestyle	23.22	11 Q	23.14	10	did not advance	
Janis Saltans	100 m freestyle	51.57	18	did not advance			
Janis Saltans	50 m backstroke	26.03	5 Q	26.06	9	did not advance	
Janis Saltans	100 m backstroke	57.00	17	did not advance			
Janis Saltans	50 m butterfly	24.68	6 Q	24.58	7 Q	24.66	8

Girls

Athlete	Event	Heat		Semifinal		Final	
Athlete	Event	Time	Rank	Time	Rank	Time	Rank
Dana Kolidzeja	50 m breaststroke	33.28	21	did not advance			
Dana Kolidzeja	100 m breaststroke	1:13.79	22	did not advance			

== Tennis ==
Latvia qualified one athlete based on the 9 June 2014 ITF World Junior Rankings.

Singles

Athlete	Event	Round of 32	Round of 16	Quarterfinals	Semifinals	Final / BM	Rank
Athlete	Event	Opposition Score	Opposition Score	Opposition Score	Opposition Score	Opposition Score	Rank
Jeļena Ostapenko	Girls' Singles	Kuzmova (SVK); W 3–6, 6–0, 6-2	Bauyam (THA); L 6–1, 4–6, 4-6	did not advance			9

Doubles

Athletes	Event	Round of 32	Round of 16	Quarterfinals	Semifinals	Final / BM	Rank
Athletes	Event	Opposition Score	Opposition Score	Opposition Score	Opposition Score	Opposition Score	Rank
Jeļena Ostapenko (LAT); Akvile Parazinskaite (LTU)	Girls' Doubles	—	Jorović (SRB) / Teichmann (SUI); W 6–3, 6–7, 10-8	Campiz (PAR) / Palau (ECU); W 7–5, 6-0	Kalinina (UKR) / Shymanovich (BLR); L 1–6, 3-6	Kenin (USA) / Ruckstuhl (MEX); W 6–3, 7-5	3rd place, bronze medalist(s)
Jeļena Ostapenko (LAT); Daniel Appelgren (SWE)	Mixed Doubles	Jorović/Čonkić (SRB); W 6–1, 2–6, 10-5	Stollár (HUN) / Majchrzak (POL); L 2–6, 6–0, 6-10	did not advance			9

== Weightlifting ==
Latvia was given a reallocation spot to compete.

Girls

Athlete	Event	Snatch		Clean & jerk		Total	Rank
Athlete	Event	Result	Rank	Result	Rank	Total	Rank
Rebeka Koha	−48 kg	75	2	90	3	165	3rd place, bronze medalist(s)
