= Akvilė Paražinskaitė =

Lithuanian tennis player (born 1996)

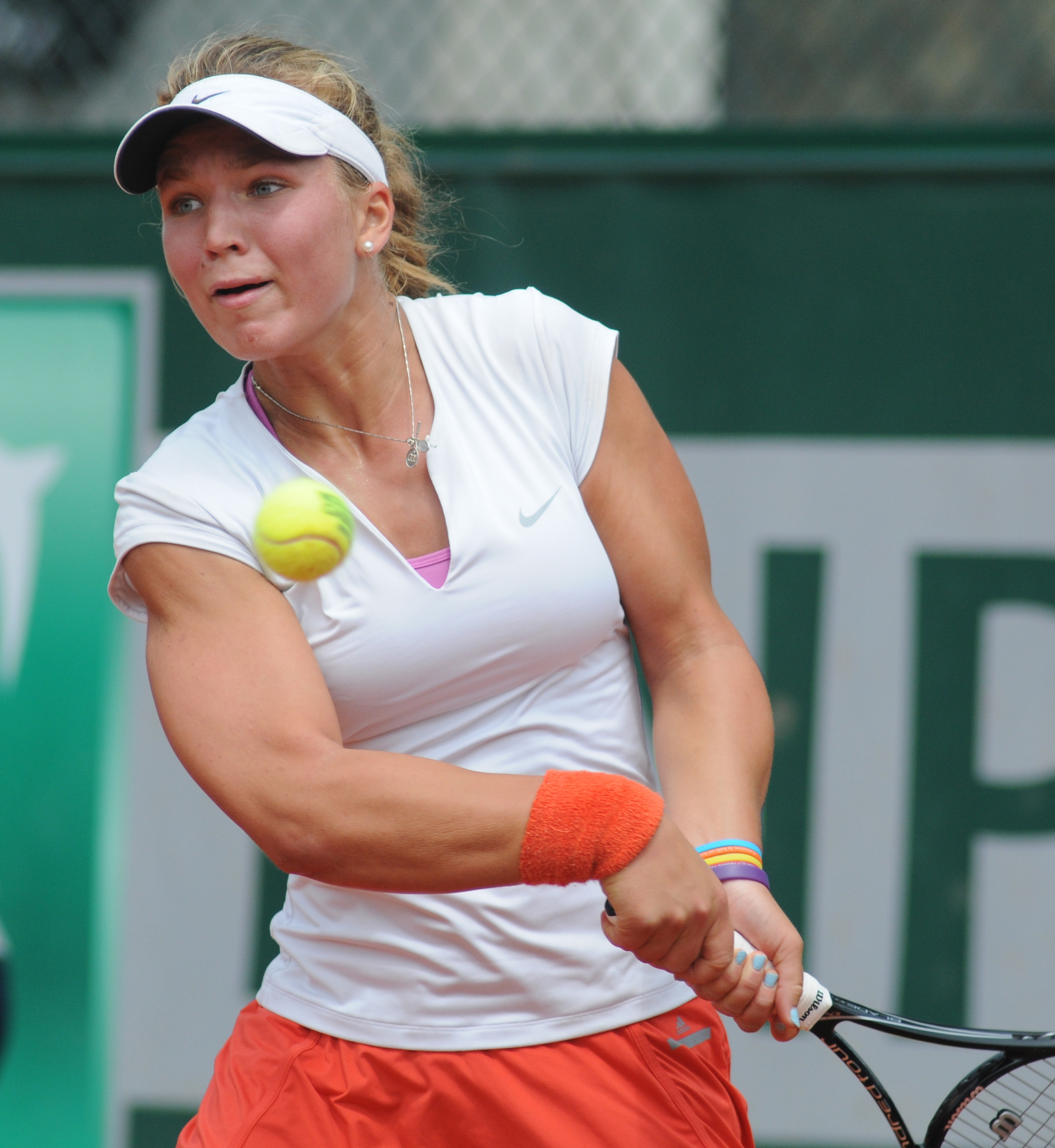
- Paražinskaitė at the 2014 French Open
- Country (sports): Lithuania
- Born: 29 November 1996 (age 29) Vilnius
- Prize money: $28,929

Singles
- Career record: 112–78
- Career titles: 1 ITF
- Highest ranking: No. 491 (18 July 2022)

Doubles
- Career record: 64–35
- Career titles: 5 ITF
- Highest ranking: No. 356 (18 July 2022)

Team competitions
- Fed Cup: 13–4
Medal record
Representing Lithuania
Youth Olympic Games
Bronze medal – third place	2014 Nanjing	Girls' singles
Representing a Mixed-NOCs team
Youth Olympic Games
Bronze medal – third place	2014 Nanjing	Girls' doubles

Akvilė Paražinskaitė (born 29 November 1996) is a Lithuanian former tennis player.

In her career, she won one singles title and five doubles titles on the ITF Women's Circuit. On 18 July 2022, she achieved both her best singles ranking of world No. 491 and her best doubles ranking of 356.

Paražinskaitė was a Division 1 College Tennis Player at the University of Kentucky from 2015 to 2021.

Playing for Lithuania Fed Cup team, she has a 13–4 win–loss record.

== ITF Circuit finals ==
=== Singles: 3 (1 title, 2 runner-ups) ===
Legend $10/15,000 tournaments (0–1)	Finals by surface Hard (1–2)

Result	W–L	Date	Tournament	Tier	Surface	Opponent	Score
Loss	0–1	Feb 2014	ITF Tinajo, Spain	10,000	Hard	(United Kingdom) Eleanor Dean	1–6, 7–6^{(2)}, 6–7^{(3)}
Loss	0–2	Aug 2021	ITF Monastir, Tunisia	15,000	Hard	(Denmark) Olga Helmi	0–6, 3–6
Win	1–2	Dec 2021	ITF Monastir, Tunisia	15,000	Hard	(Belgium) Sofia Costoulas	7–5, 6–2

=== Doubles: 10 (5 titles, 5 runner-ups) ===
Legend $25,000 tournaments (1–0) $10/15,000 tournaments (4–5)	Finals by surface Hard (4–3) Clay (1–2)

Result	W–L	Date	Tournament	Tier	Surface	Partner	Opponents	Score
Loss	0–1	Aug 2013	ITF Savitaipale, Finland	10,000	Clay	(Russia) Anastasiya Komardina	(Finland) Emma Laine (Finland) Piia Suomalainen	4–6, 4–6
Loss	0–2	Jan 2014	ITF Fort-de-France, Martinique	10,000	Hard	(Netherlands) Rosalie van der Hoek	(France) Manon Peral (Italy) Camilla Rosatello	4–6, 4–6
Win	1–2	Mar 2014	ITF Heraklion, Greece	10,000	Hard	(Russia) Alina Silich	(Czech Republic) Denisa Kulhánková (Czech Republic) Petra Melounová	6–2, 6–0
Loss	1–3	Jul 2014	ITF Sharm El Sheikh, Egypt	10,000	Hard	(Romania) Jaqueline Cristian	(United States) Jan Abaza (Russia) Anastasia Shaulskaya	4–6, 3–6
Loss	1–4	Feb 2015	ITF Palma Nova, Spain	10,000	Clay	(Germany) Kim Grajdek	(Romania) Irina Bara (Hungary) Ágnes Bukta	2–6, 4–6
Loss	1–5	Jun 2021	ITF Vilnius, Lithuania	15,000	Hard	(Lithuania) Justina Mikulskytė	(Russia) Ekaterina Makarova (Russia) Anna Morgina	2–6, 3–6, [2–10]
Win	2–5	Jul 2021	ITF Monastir, Tunisia	15,000	Hard	(France) Tiphanie Fiquet	(Croatia) Mariana Dražić (United States) Anastasia Nefedova	7–5, 4–6, [10–8]
Win	3–5	Aug 2021	ITF Monastir, Tunisia	15,000	Hard	(France) Tiphanie Fiquet	(Spain) Noelia Bouzó Zanotti (Bolivia) Noelia Zeballos	6–2, 6–1
Win	4–5	Aug 2021	ITF Monastir, Tunisia	15,000	Hard	(France) Tiphanie Fiquet	(Japan) Ayumi Koshiishi (United States) Anastasia Nefedova	4–6, 6–1, [10–6]
Win	5–5	May 2022	ITF Sarasota, United States	25,000	Clay	(China) Ma Yexin	(Chinese Taipei) Hsieh Yu-chieh (Chinese Taipei) Hsu Chieh-yu	6–2, 7–5
