= Camila Giangreco Campiz =

Paraguayan tennis player

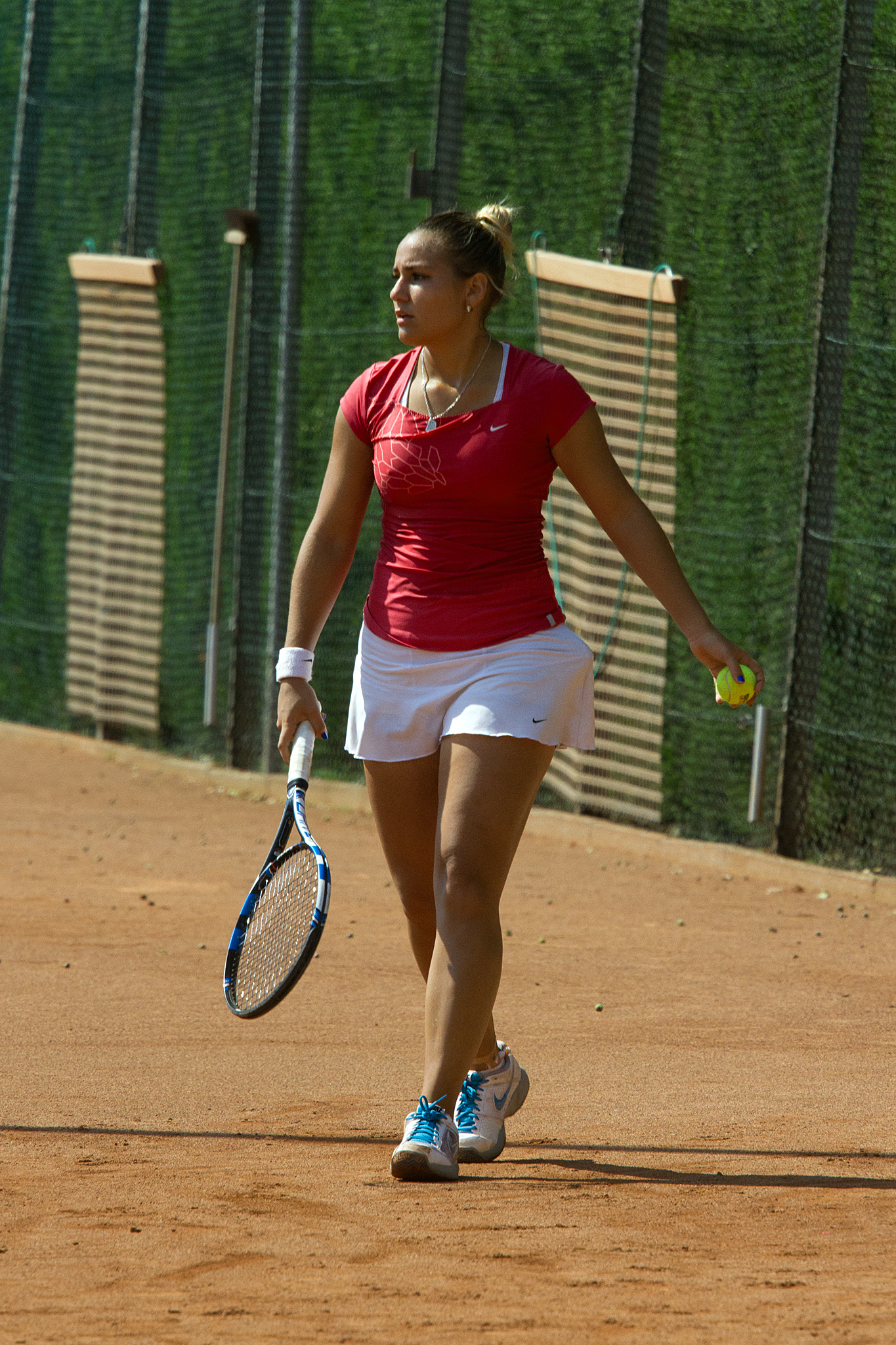
- Giangreco Campiz, August 2015
- Full name: Liz Camila Giangreco Campiz
- Country (sports): Paraguay
- Born: 24 August 1996 (age 29) Asunción
- Prize money: $48,363

Singles
- Career record: 144–109
- Career titles: 2 ITF
- Highest ranking: No. 500 (20 November 2017)

Grand Slam singles results
- French Open Junior: 1R (2013)
- Wimbledon Junior: 2R (2013)
- US Open Junior: 3R (2013)

Doubles
- Career record: 143–63
- Career titles: 20 ITF
- Highest ranking: No. 403 (1 October 2018)

Grand Slam doubles results
- French Open Junior: 2R (2013)
- Wimbledon Junior: 1R (2013)
- US Open Junior: 1R (2013)
Medal record
Representing Paraguay
Women's Tennis
South American Games
Silver medal – second place	2018 Cochabamba	Women's doubles

Liz Camila Giangreco Campiz (born 24 August 1996) is a Paraguayan former professional tennis player.

In her career, she won two singles and 20 doubles titles on the ITF Women's Circuit. On 20 November 2017, she reached her best singles ranking of world No. 500. On 1 October 2018, she peaked at No. 403 in the doubles rankings.

Playing for the Paraguay Fed Cup team, Giangreco Campiz has a win–loss record of 4–8; she also represented her country at the 2014 Summer Youth Olympics.

She was coached by Alfredo de Brix. Her last match on the pro circuit took place in November 2018.

Giangreco Campiz is married to fellow tennis player Hugo Dellien.

== ITF Circuit finals ==
=== Singles (2–2) ===
Legend $25,000 tournaments $15,000 tournaments $10,000 tournaments	Finals by surface Hard (0–0) Clay (2–2)

Result	No.	Date	Tournament	Surface	Opponent	Score
Win	1.	Oct 2012	ITF Luque, Paraguay	Clay	(United States) Anamika Bhargava	7–5, 6–4
Loss	1.	Oct 2014	ITF Lima, Peru	Clay	(Peru) Bianca Botto	3–6, 4–6
Loss	2.	May 2017	ITF Cairo, Egypt	Clay	(Georgia (country)) Mariam Bolkvadze	3–6, 6–3, 6–7^{(4)}
Win	2.	Nov 2017	ITF Encarnación, Paraguay	Clay	(Brazil) Nathaly Kurata	6–4, 6–2

=== Doubles (20–5) ===
Legend $100,000 tournaments $75,000 tournaments $50,000 tournaments $25,000 tournaments $15,000 tournaments $10,000 tournaments	Finals by surface Hard (0–1) Clay (20–4)

Result	No.	Date	Tournament	Surface	Partner	Opponents	Score
Loss	1.	Aug 2013	ITF Santa Cruz, Bolivia	Clay	(Chile) Cecilia Costa Melgar	(Bolivia) María Fernanda Álvarez Terán (Bolivia) Daniela Ruiz	5–7, 3–6
Win	1.	Apr 2015	Villa del Dique, Argentina	Clay	(Chile) Fernanda Brito	(Argentina) Ana Victoria Gobbi Monllau (Argentina) Constanza Vega	6–3, 6–7^{(4)}, [10–6]
Win	2.	Aug 2015	Duino-Aurisina, Italy	Clay	(Netherlands) Erika Vogelsang	(Slovenia) Pia Brglez (Slovenia) Sara Palčič	6–2, 7–5
Win	3.	Mar 2016	São José do Rio Preto, Brazil	Clay	(Brazil) Carolina Alves	(Colombia) María Fernanda Herazo (Bolivia) Noelia Zeballos	6–3, 6–4
Win	4.	Mar 2016	São José dos Campos, Brazil	Clay	(Argentina) Constanza Vega	(Argentina) Guadalupe Pérez Rojas (Argentina) Nadia Podoroska	6–7^{(5)}, 7–6^{(5)}, [10–8]
Win	5.	Apr 2016	Villa del Dique, Argentina	Clay	(Chile) Fernanda Brito	(Brazil) Nathaly Kurata (Brazil) Eduarda Piai	6–3, 7–5
Win	6.	Jun 2016	Buenos Aires, Argentina	Clay	(Brazil) Carolina Alves	(Argentina) Sofía Blanco (Argentina) Constanza Vega	2–6, 6–2, [11–9]
Win	7.	Aug 2016	Medellín, Colombia	Clay	(Chile) Fernanda Brito	(Colombia) María Fernanda Herazo (Argentina) Carla Lucero	6–4, 6–2
Win	8.	Aug 2016	Cali, Colombia	Clay	(Chile) Fernanda Brito	(United Kingdom) Emily Appleton (Hungary) Naomi Totka	6–1, 6–4
Win	9.	Oct 2016	Pereira, Colombia	Clay	(Chile) Fernanda Brito	(Colombia) María Paulina Pérez (Colombia) Paula Andrea Pérez	6–1, 6–2
Loss	2.	Nov 2016	Santiago, Chile	Clay	(Chile) Fernanda Brito	(Mexico) Victoria Rodríguez (Mexico) Ana Sofía Sánchez	5–7, 5–7
Win	10.	Dec 2016	Santa Cruz, Bolivia	Clay	(Chile) Fernanda Brito	(Argentina) Victoria Bosio (Mexico) Victoria Rodríguez	6–2, 7–5
Loss	3.	Apr 2017	Heraklion, Greece	Clay	(Serbia) Tamara Čurović	(Slovenia) Nastja Kolar (Bosnia and Herzegovina) Jasmina Tinjić	1–6, 1–6
Win	11.	Jul 2017	Campos do Jordão, Brazil	Clay	(Brazil) Ingrid Martins	(Brazil) Nathaly Kurata (Brazil) Rebeca Pereira	6–3, 7–6^{(1)}
Win	12.	Oct 2017	Villa del Dique, Argentina	Clay	(Chile) Fernanda Brito	(Ecuador) Mariana Correa (Brazil) Flávia Guimarães Bueno	6–3, 6–3
Win	13.	Oct 2017	Buenos Aires, Argentina	Clay	(Chile) Fernanda Brito	(Chile) Bárbara Gatica (Argentina) Guillermina Naya	7–5, 0–6, [10–5]
Win	14.	Oct 2017	Lambaré, Paraguay	Clay	(Chile) Fernanda Brito	(Brazil) Thaisa Grana Pedretti (Bolivia) Noelia Zeballos	w/o
Win	15.	Nov 2017	Asunción, Paraguay	Clay	(Chile) Fernanda Brito	(Brazil) Thaisa Grana Pedretti (Brazil) Nathaly Kurata	7–6^{(7)}, 6–4
Loss	4.	Dec 2017	Santa Cruz, Bolivia	Clay	(Chile) Fernanda Brito	(Argentina) Victoria Bosio (Argentina) Stephanie Mariel Petit	5–7, 6–2, [8–10]
Win	16.	Mar 2018	Campinas, Brazil	Clay	(Chile) Fernanda Brito	(Paraguay) Lara Escauriza (Mexico) Marcela Zacarías	6–4, 4–6, [10–4]
Win	17.	Jul 2018	Tampere Open, Finland	Clay	(Serbia) Bojana Marinković	(Russia) Polina Bakhmutkina (Estonia) Elena Malygina	1–6, 6–4, [10–7]
Win	18.	Aug 2018	ITF Lambaré, Paraguay	Clay	(Chile) Fernanda Brito	(Chile) Bárbara Gatica (Brazil) Rebeca Pereira	6–4, 4–6, [10–3]
Win	19.	Sep 2018	ITF Asunción, Paraguay	Clay	(Chile) Fernanda Brito	(Brazil) Marcela Guimaraes Bueno (Russia) Anastasia Shaulskaya	6–0, 6–2
Loss	5.	Sep 2018	ITF Luque, Paraguay	Hard	(Paraguay) Sarah Tami-Masi	(Guatemala) Melissa Morales (Guatemala) Kirsten-Andrea Weedon	5–7, 4–6
Win	20.	Sep 2018	ITF Buenos Aires, Argentina	Clay	(Chile) Fernanda Brito	(Argentina) Julieta Lara Estable (Argentina) Catalina Pella	7–5, 7–6^{(2)}
