= Sweden at the Youth Olympics =

- IOC code: SWE
- NOC: Swedish Olympic Committee
- Website: www.sok.se (in Swedish and English)
- Medals Ranked 12th: Gold 21 Silver 16 Bronze 17 Total 54

Summer appearances
- 2010; 2014; 2018

Winter appearances
- 2012; 2016; 2020; 2024

Sweden has participated at the Youth Olympic Games in every edition since the inaugural 2010 Games and has earned medals from every edition. Sweden has never hosted the Youth Olympics, but showed interest to bid for the 2018 Summer Games.

== Medalists ==
=== Summer Youth Olympic Games ===
Medal	Name	Games	Sport	Event
Gold	Angelica Bengtsson	2010 Singapore	Athletics	Girls' pole vault
Gold	Khaddi Sagnia	2010 Singapore	Athletics	Girls' triple jump
Bronze	Jennifer Ågren	2010 Singapore	Taekwondo	Girls' 55 kg
Bronze	Heidi Schmidt	2010 Singapore	Athletics	Girls' discus throw
Bronze	Jonna Adlerteg	2010 Singapore	Gymnstics	Girls' uneven bars
Gold	Marcus Kinhult; Linnea Ström	2014 Nanjing	Golf	Mixed team
Silver	Linus Islas Flygare	2014 Nanjing	Fencing	Boys' épée
Silver	Marcus Kinhult	2014 Nanjing	Golf	Boys' individual
Bronze	Åsa Linde	2014 Nanjing	Fencing	Girls' épée
Bronze	Women's national U18 team: Albana Arifi; Julia Bardis; Hanna Blomstrand; Joumana Chaddad; Emma Ekenman-Fernis; Sofia Hvenfelt; Anna Johansson; Thess Krönell; Emma Lindqvist; Olivia Mellegård; Isabella Mouratidou; Emma Rask; Julia Sandell; Lina Wessberg	2014 Nanjing	Handball	Girls' tournament
Bronze	Agnes Alexiusson	2014 Nanjing	Boxing	Girls' 60 kg
Gold	Sara Junevik	2018 Buenos Aires	Swimming	Girls' 50 m butterfly
Gold	Jonna Malmgren	2018 Buenos Aires	Wrestling	Girls' freestyle 49 kg
Gold	Jonatan Hellvig; David Åhman	2018 Buenos Aires	Beach volleyball	Boys' tournament
Silver	Robin Hanson	2018 Buenos Aires	Swimming	Boys' 200 m freestyle
Silver	Elin Lindroth	2018 Buenos Aires	Rowing	Girls' single sculls
Bronze	Robin Hanson	2018 Buenos Aires	Swimming	Boys' 100 m freestyle

=== Winter Youth Olympic Games ===
Medal	Name	Games	Sport	Event
Gold	Magdalena Fjällström	2012 Innsbruck	Alpine skiing	Girls' combined
Gold	Women's national U18 team: Emmy Alasalmi; Kristin Andersson; Matildah Andersson; Sara Besseling; Lina Bäcklin; Johanna Eidensten; Wilma Ekström; Maria Fuhrberg; Jessica Hjort; Rebecca Höglund; Anna Johansson; Anna Kjellbin; Sabina Küller; Cajsa Lillbäck; Amanda Lindberg; Linn Petersson; Malin Wong	2012 Innsbruck	Ice hockey	Girls' tournament
Silver	Fredrik Bauer	2012 Innsbruck	Alpine skiing	Boys' super-G
Silver	Jonna Sundling	2012 Innsbruck	Cross-country skiing	Girls' sprint
Gold	Moa Lundgren	2016 Lillehammer	Cross-country skiing	Girls' cross
Gold	Johanna Hagström	2016 Lillehammer	Cross-country skiing	Girls' sprint
Gold	Women's national U16 team: Anna Amholt; Josefin Bouveng; Fanny Brolin; Jennifer Carlsson; Wilma Carlsson; Julia Gustafsson; Therese Järnkrok; Lina Ljungblom; Sofie Lundin; Ronja Mogren; Maja Nylén Persson; Linnéa Sjölund; Madelene Strömgren; Mina Waxin; Madelen Westerlund; Agnes Wilhelmsson; Ethel Wilhelmsson	2016 Lillehammer	Ice hockey	Girls' tournament
Silver	Johanna Hagström	2016 Lillehammer	Cross-country skiing	Girls' cross
Silver	Filip Vennerström	2016 Lillehammer	Alpine skiing	Boys' slalom
Gold	Adam Hofstedt	2020 Lausanne	Alpine skiing	Boys' super-G
Gold	Emma Sahlin	2020 Lausanne	Alpine skiing	Girls' slalom
Gold	Adam Hofstedt	2020 Lausanne	Alpine skiing	Boys' slalom
Gold	Erik Wahlberg	2020 Lausanne	Freestyle skiing	Boys' ski cross
Gold	Edvin Anger	2020 Lausanne	Cross-country skiing	Boys' sprint
Gold	Märta Rosenberg	2020 Lausanne	Cross-country skiing	Girls' 5 km classic
Silver	Märta Rosenberg	2020 Lausanne	Cross-country skiing	Girls' cross
Silver	Edvin Anger	2020 Lausanne	Cross-country skiing	Boys' cross
Silver	Melvin Morén	2020 Lausanne	Freestyle skiing	Boys' slopestyle
Silver	Women's national U16 team: Linnea Adelbertsson; Anna Andersson; Pulse Dyring-Andersen; Nicole Hall; Beatrice Hjälm; Ella Jämsén; Tuva Kandell; Ida Karlsson; Klara Kenttälä; Pandora Nåtby; Tindra Oknefjell; Julia Perjus; Linnea Pettersson Dove; Frida Simonsen; Ebba Svensson Träff; Alice Wallin	2020 Lausanne	Ice hockey	Girls' tournament
Bronze	Adam Hofstedt	2020 Lausanne	Alpine skiing	Boys' combined
Bronze	Sara Andersson; Oscar Andersson	2020 Lausanne	Biathlon	Single mixed relay
Bronze	Jennie-Lee Burmansson	2020 Lausanne	Freestyle skiing	Girls' slopestyle
Bronze	Tove Ericsson	2020 Lausanne	Cross-country skiing	Girls' cross
Bronze	Albin Åström	2020 Lausanne	Cross-country skiing	Boys' cross
Bronze	Märta Rosenberg	2020 Lausanne	Cross-country skiing	Girls' sprint
Bronze	Jennie-Lee Burmansson	2020 Lausanne	Freestyle skiing	Girls' big air
Gold	Uma Kruse Een	2024 Gangwon	Freestyle skiing	Women's ski cross
Gold	William Young Shing; Alexandra Nilsson	2024 Gangwon	Freestyle skiing	Mixed team ski cross
Gold	Elsa Tänglander	2024 Gangwon	Cross-country skiing	Women's sprint
Gold	Women's national U16 team	2024 Gangwon	Ice hockey	Women's tournament
Silver	Alexander Ax Swartz	2024 Gangwon	Alpine skiing	Men's combined
Silver	Elliot Westlund	2024 Gangwon	Alpine skiing	Men's slalom
Silver	Astrid Hedin; Elliot Westlund	2024 Gangwon	Alpine skiing	Parallel mixed team
Silver	Kajsa Johansson	2024 Gangwon	Cross-country skiing	Women's sprint
Bronze	Liam Liljenborg	2024 Gangwon	Alpine skiing	Men's combined
Bronze	Astrid Hedin	2024 Gangwon	Alpine skiing	Women's giant slalom
Bronze	Måns Abersten	2024 Gangwon	Freestyle skiing	Men's ski cross

=== Mixed-NOC's teams ===
Note: Medals awarded in mixed NOC's are not counted for the respective country in the overall medal table.

Medal	Name	Games	Sport	Event
Gold	Filip Ågren	2014 Nanjing	Equestrian	Team jumping
Bronze	Linus Islas Flygare	2014 Nanjing	Fencing	Mixed team
Bronze	Åsa Linde	2014 Nanjing	Fencing	Mixed team
Bronze	Veronica Edebo	2016 Lillehammer	Freestyle skiing/ Snowboarding	Team snowboard ski cross
Bronze	David Mobärg	2016 Lillehammer	Freestyle skiing/ Snowboarding	Team snowboard ski cross
Gold	Ashwathi Pillai	2018 Buenos Aires	Badminton	Mixed team
Bronze	Tonya Paulsson	2018 Buenos Aires	Gymnastics	Mixed multi-discipline team

== Medal tables ==
=== Medals by Summer Games ===
Games	Gold	Silver	Bronze	Total	Rank
2010 Singapore	2	0	3	5	28
(China) 2014 Nanjing	1	2	3	6	42
(Argentina) 2018 Buenos Aires	3	2	1	6	23
(Senegal) 2026 Dakar					
Total	6	4	7	17	29

=== Medals by Winter Games ===
Games	Gold	Silver	Bronze	Total	Rank
(Austria) 2012 Innsbruck	2	2	0	4	13
(Norway) 2016 Lillehammer	3	2	0	5	9
(Switzerland) 2020 Lausanne	6	4	7	17	4
(South Korea) 2024 Gangwon	4	4	3	11	8
Total	15	12	10	37	10

=== Medals by summer sport ===
Sport	Gold	Silver	Bronze	Total
Athletics	2	0	1	3
Swimming	1	1	1	3
Golf	1	1	0	2
Beach volleyball	1	0	0	1
Wrestling	1	0	0	1
Fencing	0	1	1	2
Rowing	0	1	0	1
Boxing	0	0	1	1
Gymnastics	0	0	1	1
Handball	0	0	1	1
Taekwondo	0	0	1	1
Totals (11 entries)	6	4	7	17

=== Medals by winter sport ===
Sport	Gold	Silver	Bronze	Total
Cross-country skiing	5	5	3	13
Alpine skiing	4	5	3	12
Freestyle skiing	3	1	3	7
Ice hockey	3	1	0	4
Biathlon	0	0	1	1
Totals (5 entries)	15	12	10	37

== Competitors ==
Summer Games

Sport	2010	2014	2018	Total
Athletics	5			5
Badminton	1		1	2
Beach volleyball	—N/a		2	2
Boxing		1		1
Diving		1		1
Equestrian		1		1
Fencing		2		2
Golf		2	2	4
Gymnastics	1	1	2	4
Handball		14	—N/a	14
Judo		1		1
Rowing	1		1	2
Sailing		1		1
Swimming	4	6	5	15
Table tennis	1	1	1	3
Taekwondo	1	1	1	3
Tennis		1		1
Triathlon	1		1	2
Wrestling			2	2
Total	15	33	18	64

Winter Games

Sport	2012	2016	2020	2024	Total
Alpine skiing	2	2	6	6	16
Biathlon	4	4	6	8	22
Bobsleigh			1		1
Cross-country skiing	2	4	4	4	12
Curling	4	4	4	6	18
Figure skating	2			1	3
Freestyle skiing	2	3	8	8	21
Ice hockey	17	17	19	18	71
Luge		2		1	3
Skeleton		2	2		4
Snowboarding	1		1		2
Speed skating	1	1		1	3
Total	35	39	51	53	173

== Flag bearers ==
#	Games	Season	Flag bearer	Sport
7	2024 Gangwon	Winter	Anon Modigs	Biathlon
7	2024 Gangwon	Winter	Louise Lundquist	Alpine skiing
6	2020 Lausanne	Winter	Lisa Norrlander	Curling (Lausanne)
6	2020 Lausanne	Winter	Lovisa Ewald	Skeleton (St. Moritz)
5	2018 Buenos Aires	Summer	Ludvig Eriksson	Golf
4	2016 Lillehammer	Winter	Erika Lindgren	Speed skating
3	2014 Nanjing	Summer	Emma Rask	Handball
2	2012 Innsbruck	Winter	Linn Peterson	Ice hockey
1	2010 Singapore	Summer	Angelica Bengtsson	Athletics

== See also ==
- Sweden at the Olympics
- Sweden at the Paralympics
