= Fencing at the 2014 Summer Youth Olympics =

Fencing at the II Summer Youth Olympic Games
- Venue: Nanjing International Expo Center
- Dates: 17–20 August

Fencing at the 2014 Summer Youth Olympics was held from 17 to 20 August at the Nanjing International Expo Center in Nanjing, China.

== Qualification ==
Each National Olympic Committee (NOC) can enter a maximum of 6 competitors, 3 per each gender and 1 per each weapon. 60 places will be decided at the 2014 Cadet World Championships held in Plovdiv, Bulgaria from 3–12 April 2014. The top 4 European, top 2 American, top 2 Asian/Oceania and top African fencers from each event will qualify. Furthermore, the top 2 Oceania fencers and the top fencer from Africa, Americas, Asia and Europe across all events not yet qualified will also qualify. As hosts, China was given the maximum quota should they not qualify, but declined to use those extra spots and a further 12, 6 in each gender was initially given by the Tripartite Commission, but only nine spots were used.

To be eligible to participate at the Youth Olympics athletes must have been born between 1 January 1997 and 31 December 1999.

NOC	Boys			Girls			Total
NOC	Épée	Foil	Sabre	Épée	Foil	Sabre	Total
Algeria		X				X	2
Argentina			X				1
Australia		X					1
Bolivia					X		1
Brazil		X			X		2
Brunei			X				1
Canada	X				X		2
China		X	X		X		3
Croatia		X					1
Egypt	X		X	X	X		4
France		X			X		2
Georgia			X				1
Germany	X	X					2
Greece			X		X	X	3
Hong Kong	X	X			X		3
Hungary	X			X	X	X	4
Iraq			X				1
Italy	X	X		X	X	X	5
Jamaica				X			1
Japan				X	X	X	3
Jordan				X			1
Kazakhstan			X				1
South Korea	X	X	X	X		X	5
Kuwait			X				1
Lebanon		X					1
Mexico						X	1
New Zealand	X						1
Niger	X						1
Poland		X		X	X	X	4
Puerto Rico						X	1
Romania			X				1
Russia	X		X		X	X	4
Senegal						X	1
Sweden	X			X			2
Syria	X						1
Togo						X	1
Tunisia			X				1
Turkey						X	1
Ukraine				X			1
United States	X	X	X	X	X		5
40 NOCs	13	13	14	11	14	13	78

== Schedule ==
The schedule was released by the Nanjing Youth Olympic Games Organizing Committee.

All times are CST (UTC+8)

Event date	Event day	Starting time	Event details
August 17	Sunday	09:30	Girls' Foil
August 17	Sunday	13:15	Boys' Sabre
August 18	Monday	09:30	Girls' Épée
August 18	Monday	13:15	Boys' Épée
August 19	Tuesday	09:30	Boys' Foil
August 19	Tuesday	13:15	Girls' Sabre
August 20	Wednesday	09:30	Mixed Team

== Medal summary ==
=== Medal table ===
Rank	Nation	Gold	Silver	Bronze	Total
1	Russia	2	0	1	3
2	South Korea	1	1	0	2
3	Hungary	1	0	1	2
4	Poland	1	0	0	1
4	United States	1	0	0	1
6	Italy	0	2	0	2
7	Sweden	0	1	1	2
8	Hong Kong	0	1	0	1
8	Japan	0	1	0	1
10	China	0	0	2	2
11	France	0	0	1	1
Totals (11 entries)		6	6	6	18

=== Events ===
Event	Gold	Silver	Bronze
Boys' Épée	Patrik Esztergályos; Hungary	Linus Islas Flygare; Sweden	Ivan Limarev; Russia
Boys' Foil	Andrzej Rządkowski; Poland	Choi Chun Yin Ryan; Hong Kong	Enguerand Roger; France
Boys' Sabre	Ivan Ilin; Russia	Kim Dong-ju; South Korea	Yan Yinghui; China
Girls' Épée	Lee Sin-hee; South Korea	Eleonora De Marchi; Italy	Åsa Linde; Sweden
Girls' Foil	Sabrina Massialas; United States	Karin Miyawaki; Japan	Huang Ali; China
Girls' Sabre	Alina Moseyko; Russia	Chiara Crovari; Italy	Petra Záhonyi; Hungary
Mixed Team Event	Team Asia-Oceania 1 Chien Kei Hsu Albert; Hong Kong; Choi Chun Yin Ryan; Hong Kong; Misaki Emura; Japan; Kim Dong-ju; South Korea; Lee Sin-hee; South Korea; Karin Miyawaki; Japan	Team Europe 1 Patrik Esztergályos; Hungary; Marta Martyanova; Russia; Ivan Ilin; Russia; Eleonora De Marchi; Italy; Andrzej Rządkowski; Poland; Alina Moseyko; Russia	Team Europe 2 Chiara Crovari; Italy; Marios Giakoumatos; Greece; Linus Islas Flygare; Sweden; Åsa Linde; Sweden; Enguerand Roger; France; Anna Szymczak; Poland
