= Sweden at the 2014 Summer Youth Olympics =

- IOC code: SWE
- NOC: Swedish Olympic Committee
- Website: www.sok.se (in Swedish and English)

in Nanjing
- Competitors: 33 in 13 sports
- Flag bearer: Emma Rask
- Medals Ranked 42nd: Gold 1 Silver 2 Bronze 3 Total 6

Summer Youth Olympics appearances (overview)
- 2010; 2014; 2018; 2026

Sweden participated at the 2014 Summer Youth Olympics in Nanjing from 16 to 28 August 2014. 32 athletes have been selected to compete at the games.

== Medalists ==
Medal	Name	Sport	Event	Date
Gold	Marcus Kinhult; Linnea Ström	Golf	Mixed team	26 August
Silver	Linus Islas Flygare	Fencing	Boys' épée	18 August
Silver	Marcus Kinhult	Golf	Boys' individual	21 August
Bronze	Åsa Linde	Fencing	Girls' épée	18 August
Bronze	Sweden women's national under-18 handball team: Albana Arifi; Julia Bardis; Hanna Blomstrand; Joumana Chaddad; Emma Ekenman-Fernis; Sofia Hvenfelt; Anna Johansson; Thess Krönell; Emma Lindqvist; Olivia Mellegård; Isabella Mouratidou; Emma Rask; Julia Sandell; Lina Wessberg	Handball	Girls' tournament	25 August
Bronze	Agnes Alexiusson	Boxing	Girls' 60 kg	25 August

=== Medalists in mixed NOCs events ===
Medal	Name	Sport	Event	Date
Gold	Filip Ågren	Equestrian	Team jumping	20 August
Bronze	Linus Islas Flygare; Åsa Linde	Fencing	Mixed team	20 August

== Boxing ==
One boxer will compete for Sweden at the games after her performance at the 2014 AIBA Youth World Championships.

Athlete	Event	Preliminaries	Semifinals	Final / RM	Rank
Athlete	Event	Opposition Result	Opposition Result	Opposition Result	Rank
Agnes Alexiusson	Girls' 60 kg	Bye	Jajaira Gonzalez (USA); L 0–2	Bronze Medal Bout Esra Yildiz (TUR); W 3–0	3rd place, bronze medalist(s)

== Diving ==
Sweden secured a quota place at the qualifying event in Guadalajara at 2 March 2014.

Athlete	Event	Preliminary		Final	
Athlete	Event	Points	Rank	Points	Rank
Veronica Lindahl	Girls' 3 m springboard	386.10	9 Q	374.05	11
Veronica Lindahl (SWE); Yang Hao (CHN)	Mixed team	—N/a		299.85	9

== Equestrian ==
One athlete are qualified for the equestrian events.

Athlete	Horse	Event	Round 1			Round 2			Total	Rank
Athlete	Horse	Event	Penalties		Rank	Penalties		Rank	Total	Rank
Athlete	Horse	Event	Jump	Time	Rank	Jump	Time	Rank	Total	Rank
Filip Ågren	Abel	Individual jumping	4	4	=16	Did not start			—	—
Europe; Jake Saywell (GBR); Michael Duffy (IRL); Matias Alvaro (ITA); Lisa Nooren (NED); Filip Ågren (SWE)	Galaxy; Commander; Montelini; For The Sun; Abel	Team Jumping	(8); 0; 0 (8); 0	(0); 0; 0 (0); 0	1	(4); 0; 0 (0); 0	(0); 0; 0 (0); 0	1	0	1st place, gold medalist(s)

== Fencing ==
Two fencers have qualified based on the result from the 2014 Cadet World Championships.

Athlete	Event	Pool Round	Seed	Round of 16	Quarterfinals	Semifinals	Final / BM	Rank
Athlete	Event	Opposition Score	Seed	Opposition Score	Opposition Score	Opposition Score	Opposition Score	Rank
Linus Islas Flygare	Boys' épée	Ivan Limarev (RUS); W	3	Mohammad Shaheen (SYR); W 15–4	Kei Hsu Chien (HKG); W 15–6	Justin Yoo (USA); W 15–9	Patrik Esztergalyos (HUN); L 8–15	2nd place, silver medalist(s)
Linus Islas Flygare	Boys' épée	Patrik Esztergalyos (HUN); L	3	Mohammad Shaheen (SYR); W 15–4	Kei Hsu Chien (HKG); W 15–6	Justin Yoo (USA); W 15–9	Patrik Esztergalyos (HUN); L 8–15	2nd place, silver medalist(s)
Linus Islas Flygare	Boys' épée	Samuel Unterhauser (GER); W	3	Mohammad Shaheen (SYR); W 15–4	Kei Hsu Chien (HKG); W 15–6	Justin Yoo (USA); W 15–9	Patrik Esztergalyos (HUN); L 8–15	2nd place, silver medalist(s)
Linus Islas Flygare	Boys' épée	Mohammad Shaheen (SYR); W	3	Mohammad Shaheen (SYR); W 15–4	Kei Hsu Chien (HKG); W 15–6	Justin Yoo (USA); W 15–9	Patrik Esztergalyos (HUN); L 8–15	2nd place, silver medalist(s)
Linus Islas Flygare	Boys' épée	Kei Hsu Chien (HKG); L	3	Mohammad Shaheen (SYR); W 15–4	Kei Hsu Chien (HKG); W 15–6	Justin Yoo (USA); W 15–9	Patrik Esztergalyos (HUN); L 8–15	2nd place, silver medalist(s)
Linus Islas Flygare	Boys' épée	Ibrahim Djibo Hassane (NIG); W	3	Mohammad Shaheen (SYR); W 15–4	Kei Hsu Chien (HKG); W 15–6	Justin Yoo (USA); W 15–9	Patrik Esztergalyos (HUN); L 8–15	2nd place, silver medalist(s)
Åsa Linde	Girls' épée	Shirwit Gaber (EGY); W	1	BYE	Inna Brovko (UKR); W 15–14	Sinhee Lee (KOR); L 10–15	Catherine Nixon (USA); W 15–8	3rd place, bronze medalist(s)
Åsa Linde	Girls' épée	Kinka Nagy (HUN); W	1	BYE	Inna Brovko (UKR); W 15–14	Sinhee Lee (KOR); L 10–15	Catherine Nixon (USA); W 15–8	3rd place, bronze medalist(s)
Åsa Linde	Girls' épée	Anna Maria Mroszczak (POL); L	1	BYE	Inna Brovko (UKR); W 15–14	Sinhee Lee (KOR); L 10–15	Catherine Nixon (USA); W 15–8	3rd place, bronze medalist(s)
Åsa Linde	Girls' épée	Sinhee Lee (KOR); W	1	BYE	Inna Brovko (UKR); W 15–14	Sinhee Lee (KOR); L 10–15	Catherine Nixon (USA); W 15–8	3rd place, bronze medalist(s)
Åsa Linde	Girls' épée	Balqis Alqudah (JOR); W	1	BYE	Inna Brovko (UKR); W 15–14	Sinhee Lee (KOR); L 10–15	Catherine Nixon (USA); W 15–8	3rd place, bronze medalist(s)
Europe 2 Åsa Linde (SWE); Anna Szymczak (POL); Chiara Crovari (ITA); Linus Islas Flygare (SWE); Enguerand Roger (FRA); Marios Giakoumatos (GRE)	Mixed Team	—N/a		BYE	Americas 1 (MIX); W 30–24	Asia-Oceania 1 (MIX); L 29–30	Asia-Oceania 2 (MIX); W 30–25	3rd place, bronze medalist(s)

== Golf ==
Sweden qualified one team of two athletes based on the 8 June 2014 IGF Combined World Amateur Golf Rankings.

Individual

Athlete	Event	Round 1		Round 2			Round 3			Total	
Athlete	Event	Score	Rank	Score	Total	Rank	Score	Total	Rank	Score	Rank
Marcus Kinhult	Boys	66	=1	72	138	=3	69	207	2	207 (–9)	2nd place, silver medalist(s)
Linnea Ström	Girls	75	=19	73	148	=13	73	221	=12	221 (5)	=12

Team

Athletes	Event	Round 1 (Foursome)		Round 2 (Fourball)			Round 3 (Individual Stroke)				Total	
Athletes	Event	Score	Rank	Score	Total	Rank	Boy	Girl	Total	Rank	Score	Rank
Marcus Kinhult; Linnea Ström	Mixed	65	=6	67	132	=2	70	70	140	=5	272 (–16)	1st place, gold medalist(s)

== Gymnastics ==
Athlete	Event	Floor		Pommel Horse		Rings		Vault		Parallel Bars		Horizontal Bar		Total	
Athlete	Event	Score	Rank	Score	Rank	Score	Rank	Score	Rank	Score	Rank	Score	Rank	Score	Rank
Kim Wanström	Boys' qualification	12.550	31	11.850	26	12.150	28	13.400	–	12.950	16	12.350	23	75.250	22

== Handball ==
Sweden won the 2013 European Women's Youth Championships and qualified for the Youth Olympic Games.

=== Girls' tournament ===
Roster

- Joumana Chaddad
- Thess Krönell
- Emma Ekenman-Fernis
- Albana Arifi
- Sofia Hvenfelt
- Emma Lindqvist
- Julia Bardis
- Lina Wessberg
- Olivia Mellegård
- Anna Johansson
- Hanna Blomstrand
- Isabella Mouratidou
- Julia Sandell
- Emma Rask

Group stage

Pos	Team	Pld	W	D	L	GF	GA	GD	Pts	Qualification
1	Sweden	2	2	0	0	71	38	+33	4	Semifinals
2	Brazil	2	1	0	1	56	50	+6	2	Semifinals
3	China (H)	2	0	0	2	32	71	−39	0	5th place game

Source: Nanjing 2014
Rules for classification: 1) points; 2) head-to-head points; 3) head-to-head goal difference; 4) head-to-head number of goals scored; 5) goal difference.
(H) Hosts

20 August; 16:00	China	14–39	Sweden	Jiangning Sports Centre Gymnasium, Nanjing; Referees: Karim Gasmi, Raof Gasmi (France)
20 August; 16:00	Shanshan (5)	(8–20)	Fernis, Mellegård, Blomstrand (7)	Jiangning Sports Centre Gymnasium, Nanjing; Referees: Karim Gasmi, Raof Gasmi (France)
20 August; 16:00		Report		Jiangning Sports Centre Gymnasium, Nanjing; Referees: Karim Gasmi, Raof Gasmi (France)

22 August; 16:00	Sweden	32–24	Brazil	Jiangning Sports Centre Gymnasium, Nanjing; Referees: Mariko Shimajiri, Tomoko Ota (Japan)
22 August; 16:00	Mellegård (7)	(16–11)	de Paula, Carneiro (6)	Jiangning Sports Centre Gymnasium, Nanjing; Referees: Mariko Shimajiri, Tomoko Ota (Japan)
22 August; 16:00		Report		Jiangning Sports Centre Gymnasium, Nanjing; Referees: Mariko Shimajiri, Tomoko Ota (Japan)

Semifinal

24 August; 13:00	Sweden	24–25	South Korea	Jiangning Sports Centre Gymnasium, Nanjing; Referees: Arthur Brunner, Morad Salah (Switzerland)
24 August; 13:00	Ekenman-Fernis (10)	(10–11)	Kang (6)	Jiangning Sports Centre Gymnasium, Nanjing; Referees: Arthur Brunner, Morad Salah (Switzerland)
24 August; 13:00		Report		Jiangning Sports Centre Gymnasium, Nanjing; Referees: Arthur Brunner, Morad Salah (Switzerland)

Bronze medal game

25 August; 13:00	Brazil	16–23	Sweden (bronze)	Jiangning Sports Centre Gymnasium, Nanjing; Referees: Mariko Shimajiri, Tomoko Ota (Japan)
25 August; 13:00	Rodrigues Arruda (5)	(5–11)	Blomstrand, Bardis, Rask (4)	Jiangning Sports Centre Gymnasium, Nanjing; Referees: Mariko Shimajiri, Tomoko Ota (Japan)
25 August; 13:00		Report		Jiangning Sports Centre Gymnasium, Nanjing; Referees: Mariko Shimajiri, Tomoko Ota (Japan)

== Judo ==
Individual

Athlete	Event	Round of 32	Round of 16	Quarterfinals	Semifinals	Rep 1	Rep 2	Final / BM	Rank
Athlete	Event	Opposition Result	Opposition Result	Opposition Result	Opposition Result	Opposition Result	Opposition Result	Opposition Result	Rank
Nellie Einstein	Girls' 52 kg	Liu Xiaoyu (CHN); W 011–001	Khulan Tseregbaatar (MGL); W 000S1–000	Layana Colman (BRA); L 000S2–010	Did not advance	Liu Xiaoyu (CHN); L 000–001	Did not advance		11

Team

Athletes	Event	Round of 16	Quarterfinals	Semifinals	Final	Rank
Athletes	Event	Opposition Result	Opposition Result	Opposition Result	Opposition Result	Rank
Team Yamashita; Frank de Wit (NED); Nellie Einstein (SWE); Sandrine Mbazoghe Endamne (GAB); Lubjana Piovesana (GBR); Sara Rodriguez (ESP); Tsogtbaatar Tsend-Ochir (MGL); Jorre Verstraeten (BEL)	Mixed Team	Team Douillet (MIX); L 3^{112} – 3^{200}	Did not advance			9

== Sailing ==
Sweden qualified one boat based on its performance at the Byte CII European Continental Qualifiers.

Athlete	Event	Race								Net Points	Final Rank
Athlete	Event	1	2	3	4	5	6	7	M*	Net Points	Final Rank
Arvid Nordquist	Boys' Byte CII	(23)	9	17	15	17	20	5	18	101	16

== Swimming ==
Sweden has been assigned eight quota places by FINA, but decided to compete with only six athletes.

Athletes	Event	Heat		Semifinal		Final	
Athletes	Event	Time	Position	Time	Position	Time	Position
Isak Eliasson	Boys’ 50 m freestyle	23.37	12 Q	23.40	15	Did not advance	
Isak Eliasson	Boys’ 100 m freestyle	51.96	24	Did not advance			
Petter Fredriksson	Boys’ 50 m backstroke	26.72	15 Q	26.36	13	Did not advance	
Petter Fredriksson	Boys’ 100 m backstroke	56.96	16 Q	57.11	15	Did not advance	
Petter Fredriksson	Boys’ 200 m backstroke	2:06.48	21	—N/a		Did not advance	
Jessica Billquist	Girls’ 50 m breaststroke	32.55	13 Q	32.73	13	Did not advance	
Jessica Billquist	Girls’ 100 m breaststroke	1:12.06	17	Did not advance			
Sophie Hansson	Girls’ 50 m breaststroke	32.38	8 Q	32.02	4 Q	32.01	5
Sophie Hansson	Girls’ 100 m breaststroke	1:11.32	13 Q	1:10.49	11	Did not advance	
Jaqueline Hippi	Girls’ 100 m freestyle	57.67	20	Did not advance			
Jaqueline Hippi	Girls’ 200 m freestyle	2:06.59	26	—N/a		Did not advance	
Jaqueline Hippi	Girls’ 200 m individual medley	2:20.84	17	—N/a		Did not advance	
Sara Wallberg	Girls’ 200 m breaststroke	2:34.00	9	—N/a		Did not advance	
Isak Eliasson; Petter Fredriksson; Sophie Hansson; Jaqueline Hippi	Mixed 4 × 100 m medley relay	4:03.09	14	—N/a		Did not advance	

== Table tennis ==
Elias Ranefur secured a quota place at the Road to Nanjing Series in Avarua.

Singles

Athlete	Event	Group Stage	Rank	Round of 16	Quarterfinals	Semifinals	Final / BM	Rank
Athlete	Event	Opposition Score	Rank	Opposition Score	Opposition Score	Opposition Score	Opposition Score	Rank
Elias Ranefur	Boys	Group C Dominic Huang (AUS); W 3–0	3 qB	Krishnateja Avvari (USA); W 3–1	Kerem Ben Yahia (TUN); W 3–0	Yin Jing Yuan (SIN); W 3–2	Abhishek Yadav (IND); W 3–1	17
Elias Ranefur	Boys	Hugo Calderano (BRA); L 1–3	3 qB	Krishnateja Avvari (USA); W 3–1	Kerem Ben Yahia (TUN); W 3–0	Yin Jing Yuan (SIN); W 3–2	Abhishek Yadav (IND); W 3–1	17
Elias Ranefur	Boys	Fermin Tenti (ARG); L 2–3	3 qB	Krishnateja Avvari (USA); W 3–1	Kerem Ben Yahia (TUN); W 3–0	Yin Jing Yuan (SIN); W 3–2	Abhishek Yadav (IND); W 3–1	17

Team

Athletes	Event	Group Stage	Rank	Round of 16	Quarterfinals	Semifinals	Final / BM	Rank
Athletes	Event	Opposition Score	Rank	Opposition Score	Opposition Score	Opposition Score	Opposition Score	Rank
Europe 2 Nicole Trosman (ISR); Elias Ranefur (SWE)	Mixed	Florence Seera (UGA); Christ Bienatiki (CGO); W 3–0 (WO)	2 Q	Maria Lorenzotti (URU); Hugo Calderano (BRA); W 2–1	Miyu Kato (JPN); Yuto Muramatsu (JPN); L 0–2	Did not advance		=5
Europe 2 Nicole Trosman (ISR); Elias Ranefur (SWE)	Mixed	Chiu Ssu-Hua (TPE); Yang Heng-Wei (TPE); L 0–3	2 Q	Maria Lorenzotti (URU); Hugo Calderano (BRA); W 2–1	Miyu Kato (JPN); Yuto Muramatsu (JPN); L 0–2	Did not advance		=5
Europe 2 Nicole Trosman (ISR); Elias Ranefur (SWE)	Mixed	Lily Zhang (USA); Krishnateja Avvari (USA); W 2–1	2 Q	Maria Lorenzotti (URU); Hugo Calderano (BRA); W 2–1	Miyu Kato (JPN); Yuto Muramatsu (JPN); L 0–2	Did not advance		=5

Qualification Legend: Q=Main Bracket (medal); qB=Consolation Bracket (non-medal)

== Taekwondo ==
At the YOG qualifying event in Taipei at 20 March 2014, Patricia Stirner secured a quota place for Sweden after finishing in sixth place in girls' 49 kg event.

Athlete	Event	Round of 16	Quarterfinals	Semifinals	Final	Rank
Athlete	Event	Opposition Result	Opposition Result	Opposition Result	Opposition Result	Rank
Patricia Striner	Girls' 49 kg	Mitzi Carrillo (MEX); L 1 – 13 (PTG)	Did not advance			9

== Tennis ==
Sweden qualified one athlete based on the 9 June 2014 ITF World Junior Rankings.

Singles

Athlete	Event	Round of 32	Round of 16	Quarterfinals	Semifinals	Final / BM	Rank
Athlete	Event	Opposition Score	Opposition Score	Opposition Score	Opposition Score	Opposition Score	Rank
Daniel Appelgren	Boys' singles	Francisco Bahamonde (ARG); L 1–2	Did not advance				

Doubles

Athletes	Event	Round of 32	Round of 16	Quarterfinals	Semifinals	Final / BM	Rank
Athletes	Event	Opposition Score	Opposition Score	Opposition Score	Opposition Score	Opposition Score	Rank
Daniel Appelgren (SWE); Petar Čonkić (SRB)	Boys' doubles	—N/a	André Bíró (HUN); Clement Geens (BEL); L 1–2	Did not advance			
Jeļena Ostapenko (LAT); Daniel Appelgren (SWE)	Mixed doubles	Ivana Jorović (SRB); Petar Čonkić (SRB); W 2–1	Fanni Stollár (HUN); Kamil Majchrzak (POL); L 1–2	Did not advance			
