= Golf at the 2014 Summer Youth Olympics =

Golf at the II Summer Youth Olympic Games
- Venue: Zhongshan International Golf Club
- Dates: 19–26 August
- Competitors: 64 from 34 nations

Golf at the 2014 Summer Youth Olympics was held from 19 August to 26 August at the Zhongshan International Golf Club in Nanjing, China. This marked the debut of golf at the Youth Olympics as it was voted an Olympic sport for the 2016 Summer Olympics.

== Qualification ==
Each National Olympic Committee (NOC) entered a maximum of 2 athletes, 1 male and 1 female. As hosts, China was initially given the maximum quota, but only selected a male athlete and a further 10 athletes were to be decided by the Tripartite Commission, but only seven were used, the rest were reallocated. The remaining 26 teams were decided by adding the ranking place of the top ranked eligible male and female golfers on the World Amateur Golf Rankings released on 8 June 2014. The 26 NOCs with the lowest combined rankings qualified.

To be eligible to participate at the Youth Olympics athletes must have been born between 1 January 1996 and 31 December 1998. Furthermore, all athletes must be amateur golfers who hold a recognised handicap index not exceeding 6.4.

Event	Date	Total places	Qualified boys	Qualified girls
Host nation	–	1/0	China	
Combined World Amateur Golf Rankings	8 June 2014	26	Australia; Austria; Belgium; Canada; Denmark; Finland; France; Germany; Great Britain; Hong Kong; India; Ireland; Italy; Japan; South Korea; Mexico; Netherlands; New Zealand; Norway; Slovenia; South Africa; Spain; Sweden; Chinese Taipei; Thailand; Venezuela	Australia; Austria; Belgium; Canada; Denmark; Finland; France; Germany; Great Britain; Hong Kong; India; Ireland; Italy; Japan; South Korea; Mexico; Netherlands; New Zealand; Norway; Slovenia; South Africa; Spain; Sweden; Chinese Taipei; Thailand; Venezuela
Tripartite invitation	–	4/3	Cook Islands; Guam; Panama; Swaziland	Cook Islands; Guam; Swaziland
Reallocation	–	1/3	Malaysia	Argentina; Malaysia; Switzerland
Total		32		

== Schedule ==
The schedule was released by the Nanjing Youth Olympic Games Organizing Committee.

All times are CST (UTC+8)

Event date	Event day	Starting time	Event details
19 August	Tuesday	08:30	Boys' Individual: 1st Round; Girls' Individual: 1st Round
20 August	Wednesday	08:30	Boys' Individual: 2nd Round; Girls' Individual: 2nd Round
21 August	Thursday	08:30	Boys' Individual: Final Round; Girls' Individual: Final Round
24 August	Sunday	08:30	Mixed Team: Foursome
25 August	Monday	08:30	Mixed Team: Fourball
26 August	Tuesday	08:30	Mixed Team: Individual Stroke Play

== Medal summary ==
=== Medal table ===
Rank	Nation	Gold	Silver	Bronze	Total
1	South Korea	1	1	0	2
1	Sweden	1	1	0	2
3	Italy	1	0	1	2
4	Chinese Taipei	0	1	0	1
5	Thailand	0	0	2	2
Totals (5 entries)		3	3	3	9

=== Events ===
Event	Gold	Silver	Bronze
Boys' individual	Renato Paratore; Italy	Marcus Kinhult; Sweden	Danthai Boonma; Thailand
Girls' individual	Lee So-young; South Korea	Cheng Ssu-Chia; Chinese Taipei	Supamas Sangchan; Thailand
Mixed team	Sweden; Marcus Kinhult; Linnea Ström	South Korea; Lee So-young; Youm Eun-ho	Italy; Renato Paratore; Virginia Elena Carta
