= Hungary at the 2014 Summer Youth Olympics =

- IOC code: HUN
- NOC: Hungarian Olympic Committee
- Website: www.olympic-hun.org

in Nanjing
- Competitors: 57 in 16 sports
- Medals Ranked 8th: Gold 6 Silver 6 Bronze 11 Total 23

Summer Youth Olympics appearances (overview)
- 2010; 2014; 2018

Hungary competed at the 2014 Summer Youth Olympics, in Nanjing, China from 16 August to 28 August 2014.

== Medalists ==
Medal	Name	Sport	Event	Date
Gold	Patrik Esztergályos	Fencing	Boys' épée	18 August
Gold	Szabina Gercsák	Judo	Girls' -63 kg	18 August
Gold	Benjámin Grátz	Swimming	Boys' 200 metre individual medley	18 August
Gold	Liliána Szilágyi	Swimming	Girls' 200 metre butterfly	18 August
Gold	István Péni	Shooting	Mixed teams 10 m air rifle (in mixed-NOC team with EGY)	22 August
Gold	Tamás Kenderesi	Swimming	Boys' 200 metre butterfly	22 August
Gold	Liliána Szilágyi	Swimming	Girls' 100 metre butterfly	22 August
Silver	Patrik Esztergályos	Fencing	Mixed team (in mixed-NOC team with Europe 1)	20 August
Silver	Bence Lehmann	Triathlon	Mixed relay (in mixed-NOC team with Europe 3)	21 August
Silver	Benjámin Grátz	Swimming	Boys' 200 metre butterfly	22 August
Silver	Botond Kardos	Gymnastics	Boys' parallel bars	24 August
Silver	Bence Halász	Athletics	Boys' hammer throw	24 August
Silver	Milán Mozgi	Canoeing	Boys' K1 sprint	24 August
Silver	Luca Homonnai	Canoeing	Girls' K1 sprint	24 August
Silver	Gergely Regős	Modern pentathlon	Boys' individual	24 August
Silver	Anna Zs.Tóth	Modern pentathlon	Mixed relay (in mixed-NOC team with MEX)	26 August
Bronze	Norbert Szabó	Swimming	Boys' 200 metre individual medley	18 August
Bronze	Anna Sztankovics	Swimming	Girls' 50 metre breaststroke	18 August
Bronze	Petra Záhonyi	Fencing	Girls' Sabre	19 August
Bronze	István Péni	Shooting	Boys' 10m air rifle	20 August
Bronze	Anna Sztankovics	Swimming	Girls' 200 metre breaststroke	22 August
Bronze	Zsófia Matild Bacskay	Athletics	Girls' hammer throw	24 August
Bronze	Jonatán Vadnai	Sailing	Boys' Byte CII	24 August
Bronze	Fanni Stollár	Tennis	Mixed doubles (in mixed-NOC team with POL)	24 August
Bronze	Márk Xavér Schmölcz	Athletics	Boys' javelin throw	25 August
Bronze	Lili Anna Toth	Athletics	Girls' 2000 metre Steeplechase	25 August
Bronze	Eszter Bajnok	Athletics	Girls' triple jump	25 August
Bronze	Richárd Könnyű	Boxing	Boys' 60 kg	25 August

== Athletics ==
Hungary qualified ten athletes.

Qualification Legend: Q=Final A (medal); qB=Final B (non-medal); qC=Final C (non-medal); qD=Final D (non-medal); qE=Final E (non-medal)

Boys
Field events

Athlete	Event	Qualification		Final	
Athlete	Event	Distance	Rank	Distance	Rank
Márk Schmölcz	Javelin throw	75.99 PB	4 Q	72.40	3rd place, bronze medalist(s)
Bence Halász	Hammer throw	83.68	1 Q	81.90	2nd place, silver medalist(s)

Girls
Track & road events

Athlete	Event	Heats		Final	
Athlete	Event	Result	Rank	Result	Rank
Melinda Ferenczi	200 m	24.73	7 Q	24.79	8
Klaudia Sorok	100 m hurdles	13.66	5 Q	13.66	4
Lili Anna Toth	2000 m steeplechase	6:40.00 PB	3 Q	6:31.92 PB	3rd place, bronze medalist(s)

Field events

Athlete	Event	Qualification		Final	
Athlete	Event	Distance	Rank	Distance	Rank
Eszter Bajnok	Triple jump	12.84	4 Q	13.01 PB	3rd place, bronze medalist(s)
Petra Luterán	High jump	1.78	4 Q	1.81	4
Réka Kiss	Pole vault	3.55	8 Q	3.70	7
Alexandra Kálmán	Discus throw	40.76	10 qB	42.05	2
Zsofia Matild Bacskay	Hammer throw	69.35	3 Q	67.35	3rd place, bronze medalist(s)

== Basketball ==
Hungary qualified a boys' and girls' team based on the 1 June 2014 FIBA 3x3 National Federation Rankings.

Skills Competition

Athlete	Event	Qualification				Final			
Athlete	Event	Round 1	Round 2	Total	Rank	Round 1	Round 2	Total	Rank
Attila Kis	Boys' Dunk Contest	0	20	20	16	Did not advance			

Athlete	Event	Qualification			Final		
Athlete	Event	Points	Time	Rank	Points	Time	Rank
Nina Aho	Girls' Shoot-out Contest	3	27.0	40	Did not advance		
Dorottya Nagy	Girls' Shoot-out Contest	5	28.4	16	Did not advance		
Cintia Simon	Girls' Shoot-out Contest	4	23.7	22	Did not advance		
Tímea Tóth	Girls' Shoot-out Contest	5	24.2	10	Did not advance		

=== Boys' tournament ===
Roster

- Kristóf Horváth
- Attila Kis
- Gergely Major
- János Mike

Group stage

Pos	Team	Pld	W	L	PF	PA	PD	Pts	Qualification
1	Lithuania	9	9	0	165	129	+36	18	Round of 16
2	Slovenia	9	7	2	152	120	+32	16	Round of 16
3	China	9	6	3	164	143	+21	15 (Note: CHN +1, PUR −1)	Round of 16
4	Puerto Rico	9	6	3	152	136	+16	15	Round of 16
5	Poland	9	5	4	153	127	+26	14	Round of 16
6	France	9	4	5	151	127	+24	13	Round of 16
7	Hungary	9	3	6	158	165	−7	12	Round of 16
8	Uruguay	9	2	7	103	154	−51	11 (Note: URU +1, GER −1)	Round of 16
9	Germany	9	2	7	118	149	−31	11	Eliminated
10	Indonesia	9	1	8	86	152	−66	10	Eliminated

Notes:

18 August 2014
17:00

Hungary	19–21	Slovenia

Wutaishan Sports Center, Nanjing

18 August 2014
21:40

Hungary	13–18	Germany

Wutaishan Sports Center, Nanjing

19 August 2014
19:00

Uruguay	12–21	Hungary

Wutaishan Sports Center, Nanjing

20 August 2014
18:00

Hungary	13–19	Lithuania

Wutaishan Sports Center, Nanjing

20 August 2014
20:40

Poland	21–18	Hungary

Wutaishan Sports Center, Nanjing

22 August 2014
18:40

Hungary	21–20	France

Wutaishan Sports Center, Nanjing

23 August 2014
18:00

Puerto Rico	19–15	Hungary

Wutaishan Sports Center, Nanjing

23 August 2014
20:40

Hungary	22–14	Indonesia

Wutaishan Sports Center, Nanjing

24 August 2014
20:00

China	21–16	Hungary

Wutaishan Sports Center, Nanjing

Knockout Stage

Round of 16	Quarterfinals	Semifinals	Final	Rank
Opposition Score	Opposition Score	Opposition Score	Opposition Score	Rank
Russia; L 12-17	did not advance			14

=== Girls' tournament ===
Roster

- Nina Aho
- Dorottya Nagy
- Cintia Simon
- Tímea Tóth

Group stage

Pos	Team	Pld	W	D	L	PF	PA	PD	Pts	Qualification
1	Netherlands	9	8	0	1	164	87	+77	24	Round of 16
2	Hungary	9	8	0	1	146	91	+55	24	Round of 16
3	Spain	9	7	0	2	151	95	+56	21	Round of 16
4	Estonia	9	5	0	4	130	109	+21	15	Round of 16
5	China	9	5	0	4	128	103	+25	15	Round of 16
6	Germany	9	4	0	5	111	133	−22	12	Round of 16
7	Brazil	9	3	0	6	101	123	−22	9	Round of 16
8	Venezuela	9	2	0	7	101	153	−52	6	Round of 16
9	Slovenia	9	2	0	7	120	156	−36	6	Eliminated
10	Syria	9	1	0	8	68	170	−102	3	Eliminated

18 August 2014
18:40

Hungary	18–12	Slovenia

Wutaishan Sports Center, Nanjing

19 August 2014
18:20

Hungary	16–11	Spain

Wutaishan Sports Center, Nanjing

19 August 2014
20:40

Germany	7–15	Hungary

Wutaishan Sports Center, Nanjing

20 August 2014
19:40

Hungary	21–12	Brazil

Wutaishan Sports Center, Nanjing

22 August 2014
17:40

Netherlands	18–8	Hungary

Wutaishan Sports Center, Nanjing

22 August 2014
20:40

Hungary	vs.	China

Wutaishan Sports Center, Nanjing

23 August 2014
19:40

Estonia	10–12	Hungary

Wutaishan Sports Center, Nanjing

24 August 2014
17:20

Hungary	vs.	Venezuela

Wutaishan Sports Center, Nanjing

24 August 2014
21:40

Syria	5–21	Hungary

Wutaishan Sports Center, Nanjing

Knockout Stage

Round of 16	Quarterfinals	Semifinals	Final	Rank
Opposition Score	Opposition Score	Opposition Score	Opposition Score	Rank
Egypt; W 20-18	Germany; W 20–13	United States; L 14–21	Spain; L 11-12	4

== Boxing ==
Hungary qualified three boxers based on its performance at the 2014 AIBA Youth World Championships

Boys

Athlete	Event	Preliminaries	Semifinals	Final / RM	Rank
Athlete	Event	Opposition Result	Opposition Result	Opposition Result	Rank
Richárd Könnyű	-60 kg	Segura (MEX); W 3-0	Zhussupov (KAZ); L 0-3	Bronze medal Bout Hosaka (JPN); W 3-0	3rd place, bronze medalist(s)
Richárd Tóth	-64 kg	Avcı (TUR); L 0-3	Did not advance	Bout for 5th place Petrov (UKR); L 0-3	6
László Komor	+91 kg	Kerimkhanov (RUS); L 0-3	Did not advance	Bout for 5th place Espíndola (ARG); W w/o	5

== Canoeing ==
Hungary qualified three boats based on its performance at the 2013 World Junior Canoe Sprint and Slalom Championships.

Boys

Athlete	Event	Qualification		Repechage		Round of 16		Quarterfinals	Semifinals	Final / BM	Rank
Athlete	Event	Time	Rank	Time	Rank	Time	Rank	Opposition Result	Opposition Result	Opposition Result	Rank
Zoltán Koleszár	C1 slalom	1:30.064	7 R	1:47.848	3 Q	—		Hendrick (IRL); L 1:41.600	Did not advance		7
Zoltán Koleszár	C1 sprint	1:48.800	4 Q	—		1:49.801	5 Q	Tarnovschi (MDA); L 1:52.240	Did not advance		8
Milán Mozgi	K1 slalom	1:32.435	12 Q	—		1:21.934	9	Did not advance			9
Milán Mozgi	K1 sprint	1:35.154	3 Q	—		1:33.873	2 Q	Weiß (GER); W 1:32.712	Milinković (SRB); W 1:33.633	Daineka (BLR); L 1:37.336	2nd place, silver medalist(s)

Girls

Athlete	Event	Qualification		Repechage		Round of 16		Quarterfinals	Semifinals	Final / BM	Rank
Athlete	Event	Time	Rank	Time	Rank	Time	Rank	Opposition Result	Opposition Result	Opposition Result	Rank
Luca Homonnai	K1 slalom	1:25.779	10 R	1:29.064	2 q	1:26.743	10	Did not advance			10
Luca Homonnai	K1 sprint	1:46.186	2 Q	—		1:46.729	2 Q	Iversen (DEN); W 1:43.872	Morison Rey (ESP); W 1:44.467	Nikitina (RUS); L 1:51.425	2nd place, silver medalist(s)

== Cycling ==
Hungary qualified a boys' and girls' team based on its ranking issued by the UCI.

Team

Athletes	Event	Cross-country eliminator		Time trial			BMX		Cross-country race			Road race			Total pts	Rank
Athletes	Event	Rank	Points	Time	Rank	Points	Rank	Points	Time	Rank	Points	Time	Rank	Points	Total pts	Rank
Attila Erdélyi; Dániel Móricz	Boys' team	7	25	5:23.69	15	2	21	0	1:01:07	14	3	DNF; 1:37:29	31	0	30	19
Lilla Megyaszai; Zsanett Tolnai	Girls' team	4	50	6:43.37	24	0	10	20	49:19	13	4	1:12:36; 1:18:07	18; 38	0	74	16

Mixed relay

Athletes	Event	Cross-country girls' race	Cross-country boys' race	Boys' road race	Girls' road race	Total time	Rank
Lilla Megyaszai; Attila Erdélyi; Dániel Móricz; Zsanett Tolnai	Mixed Team relay					18:53	16

== Fencing ==
Hungary qualified four athletes based on its performance at the 2014 FIE Cadet World Championships.

Boys

Athlete	Event	Pool round	Seed	Round of 16	Quarterfinals	Semifinals	Final / BM	Rank
Athlete	Event	Opposition Score	Seed	Opposition Score	Opposition Score	Opposition Score	Opposition Score	Rank
Patrik Esztergályos	Épée	Pool 1 Limarev (RUS) Flygare (SWE); W Shaheen (SYR); W 5-2; Chien (HKG) Hassane (NIG); W 5-2; Unterhauser (GER)	5	Abate (ITA); W 13-12	Unterhauser (GER); W 15-10	Limarev (RUS); W 15-5	Flygare (SWE); W 15-8	1st place, gold medalist(s)

Girls

Athlete	Event	Pool Round	Seed	Round of 16	Quarterfinals	Semifinals	Final / BM	Rank
Athlete	Event	Opposition Score	Seed	Opposition Score	Opposition Score	Opposition Score	Opposition Score	Rank
Kinga Nagy	Épée	Pool 2 Linde (SWE) Lee (KOR) Mroszczak (POL) Gaber (EGY) Alqudah (JOR); W 5-2	4	Brovko (UKR); L 9-15	Did not advance			9
Flóra Pásztor	Foil	Massialas (USA); W 5-3; Miyawaki (JPN) Huang (CHN) Cecchini (BRA) Guillaume (FRA) Clavijo (BOL); W 5-1		Clavijo (BOL); W 15-5	Massialas (USA); L 9-15	Did not advance		
Petra Záhonyi	Sabre	Crovari (ITA) Jeon (KOR) Toledo (MEX) Colon (PUR) Boungab (ALG)				Moseyko (RUS); L 12-15	Emura (JPN); W 15-13	3rd place, bronze medalist(s)

Mixed team

Athletes	Event	Round of 16	Quarterfinals	Semifinals / PM	Final / PM	Rank
Athletes	Event	Opposition Score	Opposition Score	Opposition Score	Opposition Score	Rank
Europe 1 Patrik Esztergályos (HUN); Marta Martyanova (RUS); Ivan Ilin (RUS); Eleonora De Marchi (ITA); Andrzej Rządkowski (POL); Alina Moseyko (RUS)	Mixed Team		Americas 2 W 30-29	Asia-Oceania 2 W	Asia-Oceania 1 L	2nd place, silver medalist(s)

== Gymnastics ==
=== Artistic gymnastics ===
Hungary qualified one athlete based on its performance at the 2014 European MAG Championships and another athlete based on its performance at the 2014 European WAG Championships.

Boys

Athlete	Event	Apparatus						Total	Rank
Athlete	Event	F	PH	R	V	PB	HB	Total	Rank
Botond Kardos	Qualification	14.050 2 Q	13.775 4 Q	13.450 5 Q	14.550 3	14.050 2 Q	13.400 7 Q	83.250	3 Q
Botond Kardos	All-around	14.300	13.900	12.850	14.500	14.100	13.000	82.650	4
Botond Kardos	Floor exercise	—						13.433	6
Botond Kardos	Pommel horse	—						13.566	4
Botond Kardos	Rings	—						13.366	5
Botond Kardos	Parallel bars	—						14.016	2nd place, silver medalist(s)
Botond Kardos	Horizontal bar	—						13.166	6

Girls

Athlete	Event	Apparatus				Total	Rank
Athlete	Event	F	V	UB	BB	Total	Rank
Boglárka Dévai	Qualification	13.650 13	12.000 11 Q	11.150 25	12.800 18	48.900	16 Q
Boglárka Dévai	All-around	12.100	13.400	11.550	10.400	47.450	16
Boglárka Dévai	Vault	—				13.766	6

== Judo ==
Hungary qualified two athletes based on its performance at the 2013 Cadet World Judo Championships.

Individual

Athlete	Event	Round of 32	Round of 16	Quarterfinals	Semifinals	Rep 1	Rep 2	Rep 3	Rep 4	Final / BM	Rank
Athlete	Event	Opposition Result	Opposition Result	Opposition Result	Opposition Result	Opposition Result	Opposition Result	Opposition Result	Opposition Result	Opposition Result	Rank
Márton Sárecz	Boys' -66 kg	—	Diaz (USA); L 000-100	Did not advance		Bye	Minkou (BLR); L 000-001	Did not advance			11
Szabina Gercsák	Girls' -63 kg	—	Banda (ZAM); W 100-000	Carabalí (COL); W 100-000	Mullenberg (NED); W 100-000	—				Dobre (ROU); W 102-000	1st place, gold medalist(s)

Team

Athletes	Event	Round of 16	Quarterfinals	Semifinals	Final	Rank
Athletes	Event	Opposition Result	Opposition Result	Opposition Result	Opposition Result	Rank
Team Chochishvili; Stefania Adelina Dobre (ROU); Fatim Fofana (CIV); Bogdan Iadov (UKR); Louis Krieber-Gagnon (CAN); Liu Xiaoyu (CHN); Yu-Hsuan Lo (TPE); Márton Sárecz (HUN); Estefania Soriano (DOM)	Mixed Team	Team Kerr (MIX); L 3 – 4	Did not advance			9
Team Ruska; Sadjia Amrane (ALG); Jose Basile (BRA); Harutyun Dermishyan (ARM); Szabina Gercsák (HUN); Lovro Kovac (CRO); Kamila Pasternak (POL); Julian Sancho (CRC); Betina Temelkova (BUL)	Mixed Team	Bye	Team Rouge (MIX); L 2 – 5	Did not advance		5

== Modern pentathlon ==
Hungary qualified one athlete based on its performance at the European YOG Qualifiers and another based on its performance at the 2014 Youth A World Championships.

Athlete	Event	Fencing Ranking Round (épée one touch)		Swimming (200 m freestyle)			Fencing Final round (épée one touch)			combined: Shooting/Running (10 m air pistol)/(3000 m)			Total Points	Final Rank
Athlete	Event	Results	Rank	Time	Rank	Points	Results	Rank	Points	Time	Rank	Points	Total Points	Final Rank
Gergely Regős	Boys' individual		4								2		1175	2nd place, silver medalist(s)
Anna Zs Tóth	Girls' individual		5		3	291			280					9
Gergely Regős (HUN); Marina Carrier (AUS)	Mixed relay													
Anna Zs Tóth (HUN); Ricardo Vera (MEX)	Mixed relay										2			2nd place, silver medalist(s)

== Sailing ==
Hungary qualified two boats based on its performance at the 2013 Byte CII World Championships.

Athlete	Event	Race											Net points	Final rank
Athlete	Event	1	2	3	4	5	6	7	8	9	10	M*	Net points	Final rank
Jonatán Vadnai	Boys' Byte CII	(22)	5	11	10	8	11	1	4	Cancelled		72.00	50.00	3rd place, bronze medalist(s)
Mária Érdi	Girls' Byte CII	19	26	4	10	6	6	(31); DNF	3	Cancelled		105.00	74.00	11

== Shooting ==
Hungary qualified one shooter based on its performance at the 2014 European Shooting Championships.

Individual

Athlete	Event	Qualification		Final	
Athlete	Event	Points	Rank	Points	Rank
István Péni	Boys' 10m air rifle	624.2	3 Q	183.5	3rd place, bronze medalist(s)

Team

Athletes	Event	Qualification		Round of 16	Quarterfinals	Semifinals	Final / BM	Rank
Athletes	Event	Points	Rank	Opposition Result	Opposition Result	Opposition Result	Opposition Result	Rank
István Péni (HUN); Hadir Mekhimar (EGY)	Mixed team 10m air rifle		2 Q	Babic (SRB); Arellano (PHI); W 10 – 3	Akter (BAN); Babayan (ARM); W 10 – 4	Riccardi (SMR); Milovanović (SRB); W 10 – 5	Russo (ARG); Santos Valdés (MEX); W 10 – 2	1st place, gold medalist(s)

== Swimming ==
Hungary qualified eight swimmers.

Boys

Athlete	Event	Heat		Semifinal		Final	
Athlete	Event	Time	Rank	Time	Rank	Time	Rank
Benjámin Grátz	200 m freestyle	—					
Benjámin Grátz	400 m freestyle	—					
Benjámin Grátz	200 m butterfly	1:59.31	2 Q	—		1:57.71	2nd place, silver medalist(s)
Benjámin Grátz	200 m individual medley	2:02.06	1 Q	—		2:01.08	1st place, gold medalist(s)
Dávid Horváth	50 m breaststroke	28.97	13 Q	28.66	5 Q	28.67	5
Dávid Horváth	100 m breaststroke	1:03.27	9 Q	1:02.63	6 Q	1:02.38	7
Dávid Horváth	200 m breaststroke	2:15.69	5 Q	—		2:12.39	5
Norbert Szabó	50 m butterfly	25.07	16 Q	24.93	14	Did not advance	
Norbert Szabó	200 m individual medley	2:02.95	3 Q	—		2:02.47	3rd place, bronze medalist(s)
Tamás Kenderesi	50 m butterfly	25.92	30	Did not advance			
Tamás Kenderesi	100 m butterfly	55.20	12 Q	53.94	6 Q	54.30	7
Tamás Kenderesi	200 m butterfly	2:01.26	6 Q	—		1:55.95 WJR	1st place, gold medalist(s)

Girls

Athlete	Event	Heat		Semifinal		Final	
Athlete	Event	Time	Rank	Time	Rank	Time	Rank
Melinda Novoszáth	200 m freestyle	2:03.35	16	—		Did not advance	
Melinda Novoszáth	400 m freestyle	4:14.14	2 Q	—		4:12.09	4
Melinda Novoszáth	800 m freestyle	—				8:44.61	7
Anna Sztankovics	50 m breaststroke	32.02	1 Q	32.01	3 Q	31.84	3rd place, bronze medalist(s)
Anna Sztankovics	100 m breaststroke	1:09.68	6 Q	1:09.84	8 Q	1:08.66	4
Anna Sztankovics	200 m breaststroke	2:29.89	1 Q	—		2:27.66	3rd place, bronze medalist(s)
Dalma Sebestyén	50 m breaststroke	32.09	2 Q	32.27	7 Q	32.42	8
Dalma Sebestyén	100 m breaststroke	1:10.44	8 Q	1:09.58	5 Q	1:09.71	7
Dalma Sebestyén	200 m breaststroke	2:30.90	3 Q	—		2:29.80	5
Dalma Sebestyén	200 m butterfly	2:12.14	4 Q	—		2:10.34	5
Dalma Sebestyén	200 m individual medley	2:15.99	5 Q	—		2:14.66	6
Liliána Szilágyi	50 m butterfly	27.11	6 Q	27.04	6 Q	26.82	5
Liliána Szilágyi	100 m butterfly	58.91	1 Q	58.50	1 Q	57.67	1st place, gold medalist(s)
Liliána Szilágyi	200 m butterfly	2:09.44	1 Q	—		2:06.59	1st place, gold medalist(s)

== Table tennis ==
Hungary qualified one athlete based on its performance at the 2014 world qualification event and another based on its performance at the European qualification tournament.

Singles

Athlete	Event	Group stage	Rank	Round of 16	Quarterfinals	Semifinals	Final / BM	Rank
Athlete	Event	Opposition Score	Rank	Opposition Score	Opposition Score	Opposition Score	Opposition Score	Rank
Ádám Szudi	Boys	Group A Bienatiki (CGO); W 3 – 0	3 qB	Consolation; Toranzos (PAR); W 3 – 2	Consolation; Schmid (SUI); W 3 – 2	Consolation; Yadav (IND); L 2 – 3	Did not advance	19
Ádám Szudi	Boys	Fan (CHN); L 0 – 3	3 qB	Consolation; Toranzos (PAR); W 3 – 2	Consolation; Schmid (SUI); W 3 – 2	Consolation; Yadav (IND); L 2 – 3	Did not advance	19
Ádám Szudi	Boys	Afanador (PUR); L 0 – 3	3 qB	Consolation; Toranzos (PAR); W 3 – 2	Consolation; Schmid (SUI); W 3 – 2	Consolation; Yadav (IND); L 2 – 3	Did not advance	19
Leila Imre	Girls	Kato (JPN); L 0 – 3	3 qB	Consolation; Ryabova (KAZ); W 3 – 0	Consolation; Lagsir (ALG); W 3 – 1	Consolation; Piccolin (ITA); L 2 – 3	Did not advance	19
Leila Imre	Girls	Dong (NZL); W 3 – 0	3 qB	Consolation; Ryabova (KAZ); W 3 – 0	Consolation; Lagsir (ALG); W 3 – 1	Consolation; Piccolin (ITA); L 2 – 3	Did not advance	19
Leila Imre	Girls	Ort (BEL); L 0 – 3	3 qB	Consolation; Ryabova (KAZ); W 3 – 0	Consolation; Lagsir (ALG); W 3 – 1	Consolation; Piccolin (ITA); L 2 – 3	Did not advance	19

Team

Athletes	Event	Group stage	Rank	Round of 16	Quarterfinals	Semifinals	Final / BM	Rank
Athletes	Event	Opposition Score	Rank	Opposition Score	Opposition Score	Opposition Score	Opposition Score	Rank
Hungary; Leila Imre (HUN); Ádám Szudi (HUN)	Mixed	Intercontinental 2 Dong (NZL); Johnson (SKN); W 3 – 0	3 qB	Consolation; Africa 1 Lagsir (ALG); Yahia (TUN); W 2-0	Consolation; Austria; Mischek (AUT); Levenko (AUT); W 2-0	—		17
Hungary; Leila Imre (HUN); Ádám Szudi (HUN)	Mixed	Hong Kong; Doo (HKG); Hung (HKG); L 0 – 3	3 qB	Consolation; Africa 1 Lagsir (ALG); Yahia (TUN); W 2-0	Consolation; Austria; Mischek (AUT); Levenko (AUT); W 2-0	—		17
Hungary; Leila Imre (HUN); Ádám Szudi (HUN)	Mixed	Belgium; Lung (BEL); Allegro (BEL); L 1 – 2	3 qB	Consolation; Africa 1 Lagsir (ALG); Yahia (TUN); W 2-0	Consolation; Austria; Mischek (AUT); Levenko (AUT); W 2-0	—		17

Qualification legend: Q=main bracket (medal); qB=consolation bracket (non-medal)

== Tennis ==
Hungary qualified three athletes based on the 9 June 2014 ITF world junior rankings.

Singles

Athlete	Event	Round of 32	Round of 16	Quarterfinals	Semifinals	Final / BM	Rank
Athlete	Event	Opposition Score	Opposition Score	Opposition Score	Opposition Score	Opposition Score	Rank
André Bíró	Boys' singles	Valero (COL); W 2-0; 6-3, 6-4	Lee (KOR); L 0-2; 2-6, 0-6	Did not advance			9
Anna Bondár	Girls' singles	Xu (CHN); L 0-2; 2-6, 1-6	Did not advance				17
Fanni Stollár	Girls' singles	Roșca (ROU); W 2-0; 7^{7}-6^{5}, 6-2	Heinová (CZE); W 2-1; 6-4, 2-6, 6-0	Kalinina (UKR); L 0-2; 1-6, 5-7	Did not advance		5

Doubles

Athletes	Event	Round of 32	Round of 16	Quarterfinals	Semifinals	Final / BM	Rank
Athletes	Event	Opposition Score	Opposition Score	Opposition Score	Opposition Score	Opposition Score	Rank
André Bíró (HUN); Clement Geens (BEL)	Boys' doubles	—	Appelgren (SWE); Čonkić (SRB); W 2-1; 6-1, 6^{5}-7^{7}, [10]-[3]	Khachanov (RUS); Rublev (RUS); L 0-2; 4-6, 4-6	Did not advance		5
Anna Bondár (HUN); Fanni Stollár (HUN)	Girls' doubles	—	Kužmová (SVK); Schmiedlová (SVK); W 2-1; 3-6, 6-3, [10]-[5]	Kasatkina (RUS); Komardina (RUS); L 0-2; 6^{2}-7^{7}, 4-6	Did not advance		5
Fanni Stollár (HUN); Kamil Majchrzak (POL)	Mixed Doubles	Bains (AUS); Polmans (AUS); W 2-1; 4-6, 6-3, [11]-[9]	Ostapenko (LAT); Appelgren (SWE); W 2-1; 6-2, 0-6, [10]-[6]	Giangreco Campiz (PAR); Zormann (BRA); W 2-0; 7-5, 6-2	Ye (CHN); Yamasaki (JPN); L 0-2; 6^{5}-7^{7}, 4-6	Ducu (ROU); Zukas (ARG); W 2-1; 6-3, 3-6, [10]-[5]	3rd place, bronze medalist(s)
Anna Bondár (HUN); André Bíró (HUN)	Mixed doubles	Roșca (ROU); Bahamonde (ARG); L 0-2; 6^{4}-7^{7}, 3-6	Did not advance				17

== Triathlon ==
Hungary qualified two athletes based on its performance at the 2014 European Youth Olympic Games qualifier.

Individual

Athlete	Event	Swim (750m)	Trans 1	Bike (20 km)	Trans 2	Run (5 km)	Total Time	Rank
Bence Lehmann	Boys	09:19	00:42	29:01	00:23	16:15	0:55:40	8
Flóra Bicsák	Girls	11:24	00:44	34:01	00:25	17:53	1:04:27	16

Relay

Athlete	Event	Total Times per Athlete (swim 250m, bike 6.6 km, run 1.8 km)	Total Group Time	Rank
Europe 3 Sian Rainsley (GBR); Giulio Soldati (ITA); Carmen Gomez Cortes (ESP); Bence Lehmann (HUN)	Mixed relay	21:23; 20:01; 21:23; 19:43	1:22:30	2nd place, silver medalist(s)
Europe 5 Sara Skardelly (AUT); Romain Loop (BEL); Flora Bicsak (HUN); Dmitry Efimov (RUS)	Mixed relay	22:33; 20:42; 23:20; 20:11	1:26:46	9

== Weightlifting ==
Hungary was given a reallocation spot for being a top ranked nation not yet qualified.

Girls

Athlete	Event	Snatch		Clean & jerk		Total	Rank
Athlete	Event	Result	Rank	Result	Rank	Total	Rank
Boglárka Molnár	+63 kg	71	11	NL		---	---
