= Athletics at the 2014 Summer Youth Olympics – Girls' triple jump =

Athletics – Girls' triple jump at the II Summer Youth Olympic Games
- Venue: Nanjing Olympic Sports Centre
- Date: August 22–25
- Competitors: 15 from 15 nations

Medalists
1st place, gold medalist(s)		Yanis David	France
2nd place, silver medalist(s)		Tay-Leiha Clark	Australia
3rd place, bronze medalist(s)		Eszter Bajnok	Hungary

The girls’ triple jump competition at the 2014 Summer Youth Olympics was held on 22–25 August 2014 in Nanjing Olympic Sports Center.

== Schedule ==
Date	Time	Round
22 August 2014	20:25	Qualification
25 August 2014	09:35	Final

== Results ==
=== Qualification ===
First 50% of the athletes from the Qualification round progress to the A Final and the remaining athletes to the B Final.

Rank	Athlete	1	2	3	4	Result	Notes	Q
1	Yanis David (FRA)	x	12.80	13.06	-	13.06		FA
2	Tay-Leiha Clark (AUS)	x	13.00	-	-	13.00	PB	FA
3	Tatyana Blagoveshchenskaya (RUS)	12.86	x	12.43	x	12.86		FA
4	Eszter Bajnok (HUN)	12.84	12.76	12.73	-	12.84		FA
5	Valentina Kalmykova (ITA)	12.16	12.27	12.26	12.72	12.72	PB	FA
6	Kirthana Ramasamy (MAS)	x	12.49	12.47	11.04	12.49		FA
7	Lee Hyeon-jeong (KOR)	11.63	12.08	11.94	12.44	12.44		FA
8	Konstadína Roméou (GRE)	12.31	x	12.35	11.96	12.35		FB
9	Nhayilla Rentería (COL)	x	12.31	x	11.87	12.31		FB
10	Tina Božic (SLO)	12.22	11.86	x	x	12.22		FB
11	Jessica Barreira (POR)	x	x	11.90	12.15	12.15		FB
12	Ana Garijo (ESP)	x	11.87	12.09	x	12.09		FB
13	Chinne Okoronkwo (USA)	x	12.02	12.03	x	12.03		FB
14	Nyebolo Ugada (ETH)	11.98	12.01	11.93	11.90	12.01		FB
	Gamze Simsek (TUR)					DNS		

=== Finals ===
==== Final A ====
Rank	Final Placing	Athlete	1	2	3	4	Result	Notes
1st place, gold medalist(s)	1	Yanis David (FRA)	12.78	x	13.18	13.33	13.33	PB
2nd place, silver medalist(s)	2	Tay-Leiha Clark (AUS)	12.69	13.06	12.71	12.95	13.06	PB
3rd place, bronze medalist(s)	3	Eszter Bajnok (HUN)	12.34	12.75	13.01	12.66	13.01	PB
4	4	Tatyana Blagoveshchenskaya (RUS)	x	12.83	x	12.61	12.83	
5	4	Kirthana Ramasamy (MAS)	12.35	12.39	12.37	12.64	12.64	
6	6	Lee Hyeon-jeong (KOR)	12.06	12.11	12.32	12.00	12.32	
7	7	Valentina Kalmykova (ITA)	x	x	12.16	12.18	12.18	

==== Final B ====
Rank	Final Placing	Athlete	1	2	3	4	Result	Notes
1	9	Nhayilla Rentería (COL)	11.62	12.29	11.33	x	12.29	
2	10	Chinne Okoronkwo (USA)	x	12.08	12.21	x	12.21	
2	10	Konstadína Roméou (GRE)	12.05	x	11.72	12.21	12.21	
4	12	Jessica Barreira (POR)	12.13	x	x	x	12.13	
5	13	Ana Garijo (ESP)	x	11.86	x	12.04	12.04	
6	14	Nyebolo Ugada (ETH)	11.96	11.85	11.84	x	11.96	
		Tina Božic (SLO)					DNS	
