= Swimming at the 2014 Summer Youth Olympics – Boys' 200 metre backstroke =

Boys' 200 metre backstroke at the 2014 Summer Youth Olympics
- Venue: Nanjing Olympic Sports Centre
- Dates: 22 August (heats & final)
- Competitors: 30 from 29 nations
- Winning time: 1:56.94

Medalists
gold medal	Li Guangyuan	China
silver medal	Evgeny Rylov	Russia
bronze medal	Luke Greenbank	Great Britain

The boys' 200 metre backstroke event in swimming at the 2014 Summer Youth Olympics took place on 22 August at the Nanjing Olympic Sports Centre in Nanjing, China.

== Results ==
=== Heats ===
The heats were held at 10:00.

Rank	Heat	Lane	Name	Nationality	Time	Notes
1	4	4	Evgeny Rylov	Russia	2:00.74	Q
2	2	4	Luke Greenbank	Great Britain	2:00.83	Q
3	4	5	Christopher Reid	South Africa	2:00.93	Q
4	3	4	Li Guangyuan	China	2:01.00	Q
5	4	2	Patrick Mulcare	United States	2:01.79	Q
6	3	3	Nic Groenewald	Australia	2:01.82	Q
7	2	5	Simone Sabbioni	Italy	2:02.51	Q
8	4	6	Matías López	Paraguay	2:02.55	Q
9	4	1	Žan Pogačar	Slovenia	2:02.84	
10	1	5	Robert Glință	Romania	2:03.11	
11	2	3	Patrick Conaton	United States	2:03.92	
12	3	8	Armin Porobic	Norway	2:04.29	
13	3	5	Apostolos Christou	Greece	2:04.45	
14	3	6	Geoffroy Mathieu	France	2:04.61	
15	2	2	Song Suk-gyu	South Korea	2:05.08	
16	2	1	Trần Duy Khôi	Vietnam	2:05.50	
17	3	2	Ricky Anggawidjaja	Indonesia	2:05.72	
18	1	4	Lushano Lamprecht	Namibia	2:05.80	
19	4	3	Vuk Čelić	Serbia	2:05.99	
20	1	7	Berk Özkul	Turkey	2:06.29	
21	4	7	Petter Fredriksson	Sweden	2:06.48	
22	2	8	Raham Peiravani	Iran	2:06.81	
23	3	7	Matthew Mac	Canada	2:07.24	
24	2	6	Marek Ulrich	Germany	2:07.45	
25	4	8	Kristinn Þórarinsson	Iceland	2:07.53	
26	2	7	Vitor Guaraldo	Brazil	2:08.89	
27	3	1	Yeziel Miranda	Puerto Rico	2:08.92	
28	1	3	Lau Shiu Yue	Hong Kong	2:10.70	
29	1	2	Lalalomena Andrianirina	Madagascar	2:19.68	
	1	6	Timothy Wynter	Jamaica	DNS	

=== Final ===
The final was held at 18:04.

Rank	Lane	Name	Nationality	Time	Notes
1st place, gold medalist(s)	6	Li Guangyuan	China	1:56.94	WJR
2nd place, silver medalist(s)	4	Evgeny Rylov	Russia	1:57.08	
3rd place, bronze medalist(s)	5	Luke Greenbank	Great Britain	1:59.03	
4	2	Patrick Mulcare	United States	1:59.65	
5	3	Christopher Reid	South Africa	1:59.77	
6	1	Simone Sabbioni	Italy	2:00.33	
7	7	Nic Groenewald	Australia	2:01.18	
8	8	Matías López	Paraguay	2:01.53	NR
