= Athletics at the 2014 Summer Youth Olympics – Girls' 2000 metre steeplechase =

Athletics – Girls' 2000 metres steeplechase at the II Summer Youth Olympic Games
- Venue: Nanjing Olympic Sports Centre
- Date: August 21–25
- Competitors: 17 from 17 nations

Medalists
1st place, gold medalist(s)		Rosefline Chepngetich	Kenya
2nd place, silver medalist(s)		Zewdenish Teklemaream	Ethiopia
3rd place, bronze medalist(s)		Lili Anna Toth	Hungary

The girls’ 2000 metres steeplechase competition at the 2014 Summer Youth Olympics was held on 21–25 August 2014 in Nanjing Olympic Sports Center.

== Schedule ==
Date	Time	Round
21 August 2014	19:20	Heat
25 August 2014	20:25	Final

== Results ==
=== Heat ===
First 50% of the athletes from the Qualification round progress to the A Final and the remaining athletes to the B Final.

Rank	Lane	Athlete	Result	Notes	Q
1	5	Rosefline Chepngetich (KEN)	6:20.10	SB	FA
2	4	Zewdenish Teklemaream (ETH)	6:37.65		FA
3	7	Lili Anna Toth (HUN)	6:40.00	PB	FA
4	13	Nicole Reina (ITA)	6:41.64		FA
5	10	Marwa Bouzayani (TUN)	6:45.37	PB	FA
6	16	Aneta Konieczek (POL)	6:46.47	PB	FA
7	9	Alondra Negron (PUR)	6:46.98	PB	FA
8	17	Lea Navarro (FRA)	6:48.42		FA
9	11	Rosie-May Davidson (AUS)	6:58.35		FA
10	6	Luz Karen Olivera (PER)	7:07.21		FB
11	15	Kadra Dembil (DJI)	7:07.33	PB	FB
12	1	Fatima Raya (SYR)	7:11.52	SB	FB
13	14	Nadia El Hakouni (MAR)	7:16.92		FB
14	2	Hnin Yu Soe (MYA)	7:19.47	PB	FB
15	8	Jasmina Pruginic (SRB)	7:25.93		FB
16	3	Ilham Zenati (ALG)	7:30.59		FB
17	12	Thakane Mapoho (LES)	7:40.11	PB	FB

=== Finals ===
==== Final A ====
Rank	Final Placing	Lane	Athlete	Result	Notes
1st place, gold medalist(s)	1	3	Rosefline Chepngetich (KEN)	6:22.67	
2nd place, silver medalist(s)	2	8	Zewdenish Teklemaream (ETH)	6:26.02	
3rd place, bronze medalist(s)	3	2	Lili Anna Toth (HUN)	6:31.92	PB
4	4	7	Nicole Reina (ITA)	6:38.68	
5	5	6	Marwa Bouzayani (TUN)	6:44.29	PB
6	6	5	Alondra Negron (PUR)	6:44.46	PB
7	7	9	Lea Navarro (FRA)	6:45.30	
8	8	4	Rosie-May Davidson (AUS)	6:50.62	
9	9	1	Aneta Konieczek (POL)	6:52.78	

==== Final B ====
Rank	Final Placing	Lane	Athlete	Result	Notes
1	10	1	Fatima Raya (SYR)	6:58.65	PB
2	11	3	Jasmina Pruginic (SRB)	7:04.70	
3	12	4	Luz Karen Olivera (PER)	7:05.32	
4	13	5	Nadia El Hakouni (MAR)	7:05.39	
5	14	7	Kadra Dembil (DJI)	7:13.44	
6	15	8	Thakane Mapoho (LES)	7:19.43	PB
7	16	2	Hnin Yu Soe (MYA)	7:19.47	=PB
8	17	6	Ilham Zenati (ALG)	7:29.17	
