= Swimming at the 2014 Summer Youth Olympics – Girls' 200 metre freestyle =

Girls' 200 metre freestyle at the 2014 Summer Youth Olympics
- Venue: Nanjing Olympic Sports Centre
- Dates: 20 August (heats, final)
- Competitors: 36 from 31 nations
- Winning time: 1:56.12

Medalists
gold medal	Shen Duo	China
silver medal	Qiu Yuhan	China
bronze medal	Brianna Throssell	Australia

The girls' 200 metre freestyle event in swimming at the 2014 Summer Youth Olympics took place on 20 August at the Nanjing Olympic Sports Centre in Nanjing, China.

== Results ==
=== Heats ===
The heats were held at 10:31.

Rank	Heat	Lane	Name	Nationality	Time	Notes
1	5	3	Shen Duo	China	1:59.72	Q
2	5	4	Qiu Yuhan	China	1:59.73	Q
3	5	5	Brianna Throssell	Australia	2:00.60	Q
4	4	3	Daria Mullakaeva	Russia	2:01.06	Q
5	4	4	Ami Matsuo	Australia	2:01.29	Q
6	4	6	Rachele Ceracchi	Italy	2:01.32	Q
7	3	4	Amelia Maughan	Great Britain	2:01.39	Q
8	4	5	Siobhán Haughey	Hong Kong	2:01.44	Q
9	3	5	Tjaša Pintar	Slovenia	2:01.56	
10	3	3	Kathrin Demler	Germany	2:01.86	
11	3	6	África Zamorano	Spain	2:02.26	
12	2	6	Claudia Hufnagl	Austria	2:02.49	
13	5	2	Meghan Small	United States	2:02.50	
14	2	5	Elisbet Gámez	Cuba	2:02.73	
15	3	7	Sarisa Suwannachet	Thailand	2:02.77	
16	3	2	Melinda Novoszáth	Hungary	2:03.35	
17	3	8	Monique Olivier	Luxembourg	2:03.59	
18	5	7	Patricia Wartenberg	Germany	2:03.71	
19	4	7	Marlies Ross	South Africa	2:03.73	
20	5	6	Giovanna Diamante	Brazil	2:03.75	
21	4	2	Daria S. Ustinova	Russia	2:04.14	
22	5	8	Branka Vranjes	Bosnia and Herzegovina	2:04.85	
23	5	1	Sandra Pallarés	Spain	2:05.05	
24	3	1	Natalia Jaspeado	Mexico	2:05.24	
25	2	3	Kataria Shivani	India	2:06.44	
26	2	4	Jaqueline Hippi	Sweden	2:06.59	
27	4	8	Marina Chan	Singapore	2:06.63	
28	2	2	Tamila Holub	Portugal	2:06.91	
29	4	1	Iryna Hlavnyk	Ukraine	2:07.26	
30	2	8	Lydia Musleh	Jordan	2:07.96	
31	1	5	Elena Giovannini	San Marino	2:08.27	
32	2	1	Laoise Fleming	Ireland	2:08.93	
33	1	4	Sonja Adelaar	Namibia	2:09.58	
34	2	7	Rina Yoshimura	Japan	2:10.35	
35	1	3	Nermeen Jirdy	Syria	2:14.87	
36	1	6	Dirngulbai Misech	Palau	2:33.57	

=== Final ===
The final was held at 18:58.

Rank	Lane	Name	Nationality	Time	Notes
1st place, gold medalist(s)	4	Shen Duo	China	1:56.12	
2nd place, silver medalist(s)	5	Qiu Yuhan	China	1:56.82	
3rd place, bronze medalist(s)	3	Brianna Throssell	Australia	1:58.57	
4	1	Amelia Maughan	Great Britain	1:59.41	
5	2	Ami Matsuo	Australia	1:59.63	
6	8	Siobhán Haughey	Hong Kong	2:00.08	
7	6	Daria Mullakaeva	Russia	2:01.32	
7	7	Rachele Ceracchi	Italy	2:01.32	
