= Jamaica at the 2014 Summer Youth Olympics =

- IOC code: JAM
- NOC: Jamaica Olympic Association

in Nanjing
- Competitors: 20 in 4 sports
- Medals Ranked 23rd: Gold 3 Silver 1 Bronze 0 Total 4

Summer Youth Olympics appearances
- 2010; 2014; 2018

Jamaica competed at the 2014 Summer Youth Olympics, in Nanjing, China from 16 August to 28 August 2014.

== Athletics ==
Jamaica qualified 15 athletes.

Qualification Legend: Q=Final A (medal); qB=Final B (non-medal); qC=Final C (non-medal); qD=Final D (non-medal); qE=Final E (non-medal)

Boys
Track & road events

Athlete	Event	Heats		Final	
Athlete	Event	Result	Rank	Result	Rank
Raheem Chambers	100 m	10.68	4 Q	DNS	
Chad Walker	200 m	21.17	5 Q	DQ	
Martin Manley	400 m	47.14	1 Q	46.31	1st place, gold medalist(s)
Jaheel Hyde	110 m hurdles	13.16 PB	1 Q	12.96 PB	1st place, gold medalist(s)

Field Events

Athlete	Event	Qualification		Final	
Athlete	Event	Distance	Rank	Distance	Rank
Obrien Wasome	Long jump	7.13	7 Q	7.44 PB	2nd place, silver medalist(s)
Jordon Scott	Triple jump	15.36 PB	4 Q	15.20	5
Lushane Wilson	High jump	2.07 PB	6 Q	2.08 PB	5
Vashon Mccarty	Discus throw	53.85	11 qB	55.63 PB	10

Girls
Track & road events

Athlete	Event	Heats		Final	
Athlete	Event	Result	Rank	Result	Rank
Shanice Reid	100 m	11.86	9 qB	11.97	9
Natalliah Whyte	200 m	23.79	1 Q	23.55	1st place, gold medalist(s)
Tiffany James	400 m	54.54	9 qB	54.54	10
Junelle Bromfield	800 m	2:13.22	15 qB	2:13.01	15
Janeek Brown	100 m hurdles	13.66	5 Q	13.91	6
Shanice Cohen	400 m hurdles	1:00.24	5 Q	1:03.06	7

Field events

Athlete	Event	Qualification		Final	
Athlete	Event	Distance	Rank	Distance	Rank
Janell Fullerton	Discus throw	43.23	9 qB	43.36	9

== Beach Volleyball ==
Jamaica qualified a boys' team by winning the NORCECA CAZOVA Zone Qualifier.

Athletes	Event	Preliminary round	Standing	Round of 24	Round of 16	Quarterfinals	Semifinals	Final / BM	Rank
Athletes	Event	Opposition Score	Standing	Opposition Score	Opposition Score	Opposition Score	Opposition Score	Opposition Score	Rank
Bryan Shavar; Rojey Hutchinson	Boys'	Lanci (BRA)/ Wanderley (BRA); L 0–2	6	did not advance					
Bryan Shavar; Rojey Hutchinson	Boys'	Moussa (CGO)/ Ossolo (CGO); L 0–2	6	did not advance					
Bryan Shavar; Rojey Hutchinson	Boys'	Rudolf (GER)/ Stadie (GER); L 0–2	6	did not advance					
Bryan Shavar; Rojey Hutchinson	Boys'	Moore (NZL)/ Robinson (NZL)	6	did not advance					
Bryan Shavar; Rojey Hutchinson	Boys'	Navickas (LTU)/ Vaskelis (LTU)	6	did not advance					

== Fencing ==
Jamaica qualified one athlete based on its performance at the 2014 FIE Cadet World Championships.

Girls

Athlete	Event	Pool Round	Seed	Round of 16	Quarterfinals	Semifinals	Final / BM	Rank
Athlete	Event	Opposition Score	Seed	Opposition Score	Opposition Score	Opposition Score	Opposition Score	Rank
Tia Simms-Lymn	Épée	Pool 1 Nixon (USA) de Marchi (ITA); Yoshimura (JPN); Brovko (UKR)	4	Gaber (EGY); W 15-5	Nixon (USA); L 10-15	did not advance		7

Mixed Team

Athletes	Event	Round of 16	Quarterfinals	Semifinals / PM	Final / PM	Rank
Athletes	Event	Opposition Score	Opposition Score	Opposition Score	Opposition Score	Rank
Americas 2 Dylan French (CAN); Gabriela Cecchini (BRA); Karol Metryka (USA); Tia Simms-Lymn (JAM); Pedro Marostega (BRA); Aydill-Marie Colon Quinones (PUR)	Mixed Team	Africa; W 30–20	Europe 1 L 29–30	Europe 3 W 30–29	Europe 4 W 30–28	5

== Swimming ==
Jamaica qualified two swimmers.

Boys

Athlete	Event	Heat		Semifinal		Final	
Athlete	Event	Time	Rank	Time	Rank	Time	Rank
Sidrell Williams	50 m freestyle	24.40	29	did not advance			
Sidrell Williams	50 m butterfly	26.29	35	did not advance			
Sidrell Williams	100 m butterfly	57.40	22	did not advance			
Timothy Wynter	50 m backstroke	27.61	26	did not advance			
Timothy Wynter	100 m backstroke	59.21	33	did not advance			
Timothy Wynter	200 m backstroke	DNS		—		did not advance	
