= Fencing at the 2014 Summer Youth Olympics – Girls' épée =

The girls' épée competition at the 2014 Summer Youth Olympics were held in the Nanjing International Expo Center on 18 August.

== Results ==
=== Pool Round ===
==== Pool 1 ====
Rank	Name	V#	Diff
1	Catherine Nixon (USA)	4	11
2	Eleonora de Marchi (ITA)	2	0
3	Miho Yoshimura (JPN)	2	–3
4	Tia Simms-Lymn (JAM)	1	–1
5	Inna Brovko (UKR)	1	–7

==== Pool 2 ====
Rank	Name	V#	Diff
1	Åsa Linde (SWE)	4	12
2	Lee Sin-hee (KOR)	4	8
3	Anna Maria Mroszczak (POL)	3	8
4	Kinka Nagy (HUN)	2	–1
5	Shirwit Gaber (EGY)	2	–8
6	Balqis Alqudah (JOR)	0	–19

=== Bracket ===
Round of 16
1	Catherine Nixon (USA)
16	BYE
9	Tia Simms-Lymn (JAM)	15
8	Shirwit Gaber (EGY)	5
5	Eleonora de Marchi (ITA)
12	BYE
13	BYE
4	A. M. Mroszczak (POL)
3	Lee Sin-hee (KOR)
14	BYE
11	Balqis Alqudah (JOR)	9
6	Miho Yoshimura (JPN)	15
7	Kinka Nagy (HUN)	9
10	Inna Brovko (UKR)	15
15	BYE
2	Åsa Linde (SWE)

Quarterfinals
1	Catherine Nixon (USA)	15
9	Tia Simms-Lymn (JAM)	10
5	Eleonora de Marchi (ITA)	15
4	A. M. Mroszczak (POL)	10
3	Lee Sin-hee (KOR)	15
6	Miho Yoshimura (JPN)	14
10	Inna Brovko (UKR)	14
2	Åsa Linde (SWE)	15

Semifinals
1	Catherine Nixon (USA)	11
5	Eleonora de Marchi (ITA)	15
3	Lee Sin-hee (KOR)	15
2	Åsa Linde (SWE)	10

Final
5	Eleonora de Marchi (ITA)	13
3	Lee Sin-hee (KOR)	15

Bronze Medal
1	Catherine Nixon (USA)	9
2	Åsa Linde (SWE)	15

== Final standings ==
Rank	Name	NOC
1st place, gold medalist(s)	Lee Sin-hee	South Korea
2nd place, silver medalist(s)	Eleonora de Marchi	Italy
3rd place, bronze medalist(s)	Åsa Linde	Sweden
4	Cathrine Nixon	United States
5	Anna Maria Mroszczak	Poland
6	Miho Yoshimura	Japan
7	Tia Simms-Lymn	Jamaica
8	Inna Brovko	Ukraine
9	Kinka Nagy	Hungary
10	Shirwit Gaber	Egypt
11	Balqis Alqudah	Jordan
