= Fencing at the 2014 Summer Youth Olympics – Boys' épée =

The boys' épée competition at the 2014 Summer Youth Olympics were held in the Nanjing International Expo Center on 18 August in Nanjing, China.

== Results ==
=== Pool Round ===
==== Pool 1 ====
Rank	Name	V#	Diff
1	Samuel Unterhauser (GER)	5	14
2	Ivan Limarev (RUS)	4	8
3	Linus Islas Flygare (SWE)	4	7
4	Kei Hsu Chien (HKG)	4	6
5	Patrik Esztergalyos (HUN)	3	1
6	Ibrahim Djibo Hassane (NIG)	1	–16
5	Mohammad Shaheen (SYR)	0	–20

==== Pool 2 ====
Rank	Name	V#	Diff
1	Justin Yoo (USA)	5	11
2	Sheldon Ogilvie (NZL)	3	3
3	Myeongki Kim (KOR)	2	–1
4	Ahmed Elsayed (EGY)	2	–2
5	Riccardo Abate (ITA)	2	–6
6	Dylan French (CAN)	1	–5

=== Bracket ===
Round of 16
1	Justin Yoo (USA)
16	BYE
9	Ahmed Elsayed (EGY)	12
8	Myeongki Kim (KOR)	15
5	Kei Hsu Chien (HKG)	15
12	I. Djibo Hassane (NIG)	7
13	M. Shaheen (SYR)	4
4	L. Islas Flygare (SWE)	15
3	Ivan Limarev (RUS)
14	BYE
11	Dylan French (CAN)	15
6	Sheldon Ogilvie (NZL)	14
7	P. Esztergalyos (HUN)	13
10	Riccardo Abate (ITA)	12
15	BYE
2	S. Unterhauser (GER)

Quarterfinals
1	Justin Yoo (USA)	15
8	Myeongki Kim (KOR)	12
5	Kei Hsu Chien (HKG)	6
4	L. Islas Flygare (SWE)	15
3	Ivan Limarev (RUS)	15
11	Dylan French (CAN)	5
7	P. Esztergalyos (HUN)	15
2	S. Unterhauser (GER)	10

Semifinals
1	Justin Yoo (USA)	9
4	Linus Islas Flygare (SWE)	15
3	Ivan Limarev (RUS)	5
7	P. Esztergalyos (HUN)	15

Final
4	Linus Islas Flygare (SWE)	8
7	P. Esztergalyos (HUN)	15

Bronze Medal
1	Justin Yoo (USA)	14
3	Ivan Limarev (RUS)	15

== Final standings ==
Rank	Name	NOC
1st place, gold medalist(s)	Patrik Esztergalyos	Hungary
2nd place, silver medalist(s)	Linus Islas Flygare	Sweden
3rd place, bronze medalist(s)	Ivan Limarev	Russia
4	Justin Yoo	United States
5	Samuel Unterhauser	Germany
6	Kei Hsu Chien	Hong Kong
7	Myeongki Kim	South Korea
8	Dylan French	Canada
9	Sheldon Ogilvie	New Zealand
10	Ahmed Elsayed	Egypt
11	Riccardo Abate	Italy
11	Ibrahim Djibo Hassane	Niger
11	Mohammad Shaheen	Syria
