= Syria at the 2014 Summer Youth Olympics =

- IOC code: SYR
- NOC: Syrian Olympic Committee

in Nanjing
- Competitors: 9 in 4 sports
- Medals: Gold 0 Silver 0 Bronze 0 Total 0

Summer Youth Olympics appearances
- 2010; 2014; 2018

Syria competed at the 2014 Summer Youth Olympics, in Nanjing, China from 16 August to 28 August 2014.

== Athletics ==
Syria qualified two athletes.

Qualification legend: Q=Final A (medal); qB=Final B (non-medal); qC=Final C (non-medal); qD=Final D (non-medal); qE=Final E (non-medal)

Girls
Track & road events

Athlete	Event	Heats		Final	
Athlete	Event	Result	Rank	Result	Rank
Fatima Raya	2000 m steeplechase	7:11.52	12 qB	6:58.65	10

Field events

Athlete	Event	Qualification		Final	
Athlete	Event	Distance	Rank	Distance	Rank
Mais Barhoum	Discus throw	36.62	16 qB	DNS	

== Basketball ==
Syria qualified a girls' team based on the 1 June 2014 FIBA 3x3 National Federation Rankings.

Skills competition

Athlete	Event	Qualification			Final		
Athlete	Event	Points	Time	Rank	Points	Time	Rank
Farah Assad	Girls' Shoot-out Contest	5	25.2	12	did not advance		
Sarah Sinjar	Girls' Shoot-out Contest	1	24.5	56	did not advance		

=== Girls' tournament ===
Roster

- Minerva Ajjan
- Sara Allaw
- Farah Assad
- Sarah Sinjar

Group stage

Pos	Team	Pld	W	D	L	PF	PA	PD	Pts	Qualification
1	Netherlands	9	8	0	1	164	87	+77	24	Round of 16
2	Hungary	9	8	0	1	146	91	+55	24	Round of 16
3	Spain	9	7	0	2	151	95	+56	21	Round of 16
4	Estonia	9	5	0	4	130	109	+21	15	Round of 16
5	China	9	5	0	4	128	103	+25	15	Round of 16
6	Germany	9	4	0	5	111	133	−22	12	Round of 16
7	Brazil	9	3	0	6	101	123	−22	9	Round of 16
8	Venezuela	9	2	0	7	101	153	−52	6	Round of 16
9	Slovenia	9	2	0	7	120	156	−36	6	Eliminated
10	Syria	9	1	0	8	68	170	−102	3	Eliminated

18 August 2014
19:00

Report

Spain	21–4	Syria

Wutaishan Sports Center, Nanjing

19 August 2014
17:00

Report

Syria	9–17	Germany

Wutaishan Sports Center, Nanjing

19 August 2014
21:00

Report

Brazil	19–7	Syria

Wutaishan Sports Center, Nanjing

20 August 2014
18:40

Report

Syria	4–21	Netherlands

Wutaishan Sports Center, Nanjing

22 August 2014
17:00

Report

China	20–7	Syria

Wutaishan Sports Center, Nanjing

22 August 2014
20:40

Report

Syria	5–21	Estonia

Wutaishan Sports Center, Nanjing

23 August 2014
18:40

Report

Venezuela	16–17	Syria

Wutaishan Sports Center, Nanjing

24 August 2014
18:00

Report

Slovenia	14–11	Syria

Wutaishan Sports Center, Nanjing

24 August 2014
21:40

Report

Syria	5–21	Hungary

Wutaishan Sports Center, Nanjing

== Fencing ==
Syria was given a quota to compete by the tripartite committee.

Boys

Athlete	Event	Pool Round	Seed	Round of 16	Quarterfinals	Semifinals	Final / BM	Rank
Athlete	Event	Opposition Score	Seed	Opposition Score	Opposition Score	Opposition Score	Opposition Score	Rank
Mohammad Shaheen	Épée	I Limarev (RUS); L 1 – 5 P Esztergalyos (HUN); L 2 – 5 L Islas (SWE); L 0 – 5 S Unterhauser (GER); L 1 – 5 K Chien (HKG); L 2 – 5 I Djibo (NIG); L 4 – 5	13	K Chien (HKG); L 7 – 15	did not advance			13

== Swimming ==
Syria qualified two swimmers.

Boys

Athlete	Event	Heat		Final	
Athlete	Event	Time	Rank	Time	Rank
Lorance Alsabee	200 m freestyle	2:00.07	31	did not advance	

Girls

Athlete	Event	Heat		Final	
Athlete	Event	Time	Rank	Time	Rank
Nermeen Jirdy	200 m freestyle	2:14.87	35	did not advance	
