= Jordan at the 2014 Summer Youth Olympics =

- IOC code: JOR
- NOC: Jordan Olympic Committee

in Nanjing
- Competitors: 6 in 4 sports
- Medals: Gold 0 Silver 0 Bronze 0 Total 0

Summer Youth Olympics appearances
- 2010; 2014; 2018

Jordan competed at the 2014 Summer Youth Olympics, in Nanjing, China from 16 August to 28 August 2014.

== Fencing ==
Jordan was given a quota to compete by the tripartite committee.

Girls

Athlete	Event	Pool Round	Seed	Round of 16	Quarterfinals	Semifinals	Final / BM	Rank
Athlete	Event	Opposition Score	Seed	Opposition Score	Opposition Score	Opposition Score	Opposition Score	Rank
Alqudah Balqis	Épée	S Gaber (EGY); L 3 – 5 A Linde (SWE); L 0 – 5 K Nagy (HUN); L 2 – 5 A Mroszczak (POL); L 0 – 5 S Lee (KOR); L 1 – 5	11	M Yoshimura (JPN); L 9 – 15	did not advance			11

== Gymnastics ==
=== Artistic Gymnastics ===
Jordan was given a quota to compete by the tripartite committee.

Boys

Athlete	Event	Apparatus						Total	Rank
Athlete	Event	F	PH	R	V	PB	HB	Total	Rank
Yazan Abandeh	Qualification	12.650	11.750	11.000	13.650	12.400	11.050	72.500	33

== Swimming ==
Jordan qualified two swimmers.

Boys

Athlete	Event	Heat		Semifinal		Final	
Athlete	Event	Time	Rank	Time	Rank	Time	Rank
Khader Baqlah	100 m freestyle	51.73	20	did not advance			
Khader Baqlah	200 m freestyle	1:53.28	21	—		did not advance	

Girls

Athlete	Event	Heat		Semifinal		Final	
Athlete	Event	Time	Rank	Time	Rank	Time	Rank
Lydia Musleh	50 m freestyle	27.66	34	did not advance			
Lydia Musleh	200 m freestyle	2:07.96	30	—		did not advance	

== Taekwondo ==
Jordan qualified two athletes based on its performance at the Taekwondo Qualification Tournament.

Girls

Athlete	Event	Round of 16	Quarterfinals	Semifinals	Final	Rank
Athlete	Event	Opposition Result	Opposition Result	Opposition Result	Opposition Result	Rank
Eman Aladaileh	−44 kg	Bye	A Stones (GBR); L 2 – 5	did not advance		5
Taima Hbowal	−63 kg	Bye	C Zhang (CHN); L 2 – 5	did not advance		5
