= Ireland at the 2014 Summer Youth Olympics =

- IOC code: IRL
- NOC: Olympic Council of Ireland
- Website: www.olympicsport.ie

in Nanjing
- Competitors: 16 in 7 sports
- Medals Ranked 58th: Gold 0 Silver 2 Bronze 1 Total 3

Summer Youth Olympics appearances
- 2010; 2014; 2018

Ireland competed at the 2014 Summer Youth Olympics, in Nanjing, China from 16 August to 28 August 2014.

== Medalists ==
Medal	Name	Sport	Event	Date
Gold	Michael Duffy	Equestrian	Team Jumping (part of a Mixed-NOC team Europe)	20 Aug
Silver	Ciara Ginty	Boxing	Women's Light 60kg	26 Aug
Silver	Robert Hendrick	Canoeing	Boys' C1 slalom	27 Aug
Bronze	Michael Gallagher	Boxing	Men's Heavy 91kg	25 Aug

== Athletics ==
Ireland qualified five athletes.

Qualification Legend: Q=Final A (medal); qB=Final B (non-medal); qC=Final C (non-medal); qD=Final D (non-medal); qE=Final E (non-medal)

Boys
Field Events

Athlete	Event	Qualification		Final	
Athlete	Event	Distance	Rank	Distance	Rank
Eoin Sheridan	Discus throw	53.63	12 qB	51.19	5
Adam King	Hammer throw	71.91 PB	8 Q	71.49	8

Girls
Track & road events

Athlete	Event	Heats		Final	
Athlete	Event	Result	Rank	Result	Rank
Roseanna McGuckian	200 m	24.77	3 qB	25.15	5
Louise Shanahan	800 m	2:09.58	2 Q	2:08.29 PB	6

Field events

Athlete	Event	Qualification		Final	
Athlete	Event	Distance	Rank	Distance	Rank
Michaela Walsh	Shot put	15.59	7 Q	15.69 PB	6

== Boxing ==
Ireland qualified three boxers based on its performance at the 2014 AIBA Youth World Championships

Boys

Athlete	Event	Preliminaries	Semifinals	Final / RM	Rank
Athlete	Event	Opposition Result	Opposition Result	Opposition Result	Rank
Michael Gallagher	-91 kg	Maksim Kazlou (BLR); W 3-0	Yordan Hernández (CUB); L 0-3	Bronze Medal Bout Kim Jin-nyong (KOR); W 3-0	3rd place, bronze medalist(s)

Girls

Athlete	Event	Preliminaries	Semifinals	Final / RM	Rank
Athlete	Event	Opposition Result	Opposition Result	Opposition Result	Rank
Ciara Ginty	-60 kg	Monica Floridia (ITA); W 3-0	Esra Yıldız (TUR); W 2-0	Jajaira Gonzalez (USA); L 0-3	2nd place, silver medalist(s)
Christine Desmond	-75 kg	bye	Chen Nien-Chin (TPE); L 0-3	Bronze Medal Bout Caitlin Parker (AUS); L 0-3	4

== Canoeing ==
Ireland qualified one boat based on its performance at the 2013 World Junior Canoe Sprint and Slalom Championships.

Boys

Athlete	Event	Qualification		Round of 16		Quarterfinals	Semifinals	Final / BM	Rank
Athlete	Event	Time	Rank	Time	Rank	Opposition Result	Opposition Result	Opposition Result	Rank
Robert Hendrick	C1 slalom	1:19.667	3 Q	—		Zoltán Koleszár (HUN); 1:21.403 W	Leon Breznik (SLO); 1:18.752 W	Lucas Roisin (FRA); 1:19.047 L	2nd place, silver medalist(s)
Robert Hendrick	C1 sprint	2:14.219	12 Q	2:14.706	12	did not advance			

== Equestrian ==
Ireland qualified a rider.

Athlete	Horse	Event	Round 1		Round 2			Total	
Athlete	Horse	Event	Penalties	Rank	Penalties	Total	Rank	Penalties	Rank
Michael Duffy	Commander	Individual Jumping	0	1	4	4	5	4	5
Europe; Jake Saywell (GBR); Michael Duffy (IRL); Matias Alvaro (ITA); Lisa Nooren (NED); Filip Agren (SWE)	Galaxy; Commander; Montelini; For The Sun; Abel	Team Jumping	(8); 0; 0 (8); 0	1	(4); 0; 0 (0); 0	0	1	0	1st place, gold medalist(s)

== Golf ==
Ireland qualified one team of two athletes based on the 8 June 2014 IGF Combined World Amateur Golf Rankings.

Individual

Athlete	Event	Round 1		Round 2			Round 3			Total	
Athlete	Event	Score	Rank	Score	Total	Rank	Score	Total	Rank	Score	Rank
Kevin le Blanc	Boys	73 (+1)	19	71 (-1)	144 (PAR)		73 (+1)	217 (+1)		217	16
Olivia Mehaffey	Girls	73 (+1)	11	75 (+3)	148 (+4)		79 (+7)	227 (+11)		227	20

Team

Athletes	Event	Round 1 (Foursome)		Round 2 (Fourball)			Round 3 (Individual Stroke)				Total	
Athletes	Event	Score	Rank	Score	Total	Rank	Boy	Girl	Total	Rank	Score	Rank
Kevin le Blanc; Olivia Mehaffey	Mixed	72 (PAR)	25	77 (+5)	149 (+5)		71 (-1)	80 (+8)	300 (+12)		300	27

== Rowing ==
Ireland qualified one boat based on its performance at the 2013 World Rowing Junior Championships.

Athlete	Event	Heats		Repechage		Semifinals		Final	
Athlete	Event	Time	Rank	Time	Rank	Time	Rank	Time	Rank
Eimear Lambe	Girls' Single Sculls	3:57.00	5 R	3:55.00	2 SA/B	4:02.39	6 FB	4:03.82	11

Qualification Legend: FA=Final A (medal); FB=Final B (non-medal); FC=Final C (non-medal); FD=Final D (non-medal); SA/B=Semifinals A/B; SC/D=Semifinals C/D; R=Repechage

== Swimming ==
Ireland qualified three swimmers.

Boys

Athlete	Event	Heat		Semifinal		Final	
Athlete	Event	Time	Rank	Time	Rank	Time	Rank
Calum Bain	50 m freestyle	23.57	17	did not advance			
Calum Bain	100 m freestyle	52.51	29	did not advance			
Calum Bain	50 m butterfly	25.69	27	did not advance			

Girls

Athlete	Event	Heat		Semifinal		Final	
Athlete	Event	Time	Rank	Time	Rank	Time	Rank
Laoise Fleming	200 m freestyle	2:08.93	32	—		did not advance	
Laoise Fleming	50 m backstroke	31.64	37	did not advance			
Laoise Fleming	100 m backstroke	1:06.21	30	did not advance			
Laoise Fleming	200 m backstroke	2:21.89	24	—		did not advance	
Dearbhail McNamara	50 m breaststroke	35.17	27	did not advance			
Dearbhail McNamara	100 m breaststroke	1:13.79	23	did not advance			
Dearbhail McNamara	200 m breaststroke	2:34.39	10	—		did not advance	
