= Niger at the 2014 Summer Youth Olympics =

- IOC code: NIG
- NOC: Nigerien Olympic and National Sports Committee

in Nanjing
- Competitors: 4 in 4 sports

Summer Youth Olympics appearances
- 2010; 2014; 2018

Niger competed at the 2014 Summer Youth Olympics, in Nanjing, China from 16 August to 28 August 2014.

== Athletics ==
Niger qualified one athlete.

Qualification Legend: Q=Final A (medal); qB=Final B (non-medal); qC=Final C (non-medal); qD=Final D (non-medal); qE=Final E (non-medal)

Girls
Track & road events

Athlete	Event	Heats		Final	
Athlete	Event	Result	Rank	Result	Rank
Mariama Mamoudou Ittatou	800 m	DNS qC		DNS	

== Fencing ==
Niger was given a quota to compete by the tripartite committee.

Boys

Athlete	Event	Pool Round	Seed	Round of 16	Quarterfinals	Semifinals	Final / BM	Rank
Athlete	Event	Opposition Score	Seed	Opposition Score	Opposition Score	Opposition Score	Opposition Score	Rank
Ibrahim Djibo Hassane	Épée	I Limarev (RUS); L 1 – 5 P Esztergalyos (HUN); L 2 – 5 L Islas (SWE); L 2 – 5 S Unterhauser (GER); L 1 – 5 M Shaheen (SYR); W 5 – 4 K Chien (HKG); L 2 – 5	12	L Islas (SWE); L 4 – 15	did not advance			12

== Judo ==
Niger was given a quota to compete by the tripartite committee.

Individual

Athlete	Event	Round of 16	Quarterfinals	Semifinals	Rep 1	Rep 2	Rep 3	Final / BM	Rank
Athlete	Event	Opposition Result	Opposition Result	Opposition Result	Opposition Result	Opposition Result	Opposition Result	Opposition Result	Rank
Hassiatou Yahaya Aboubacar	Girls' -63 kg	L Mullenberg (NED); L 0000 – 1000	did not advance		Fofana (CIV); L 0000 – 1000	did not advance			13

Team

Athletes	Event	Round of 16	Quarterfinals	Semifinals	Final	Rank
Athletes	Event	Opposition Result	Opposition Result	Opposition Result	Opposition Result	Rank
Team Tani; Francesco Aufieri (MLT); Rostislav Dashkov (KGZ); Luis Gonzalez (VEN); Natig Gurbanli (AZE); Ulyana Minenkova (BLR); Khulan Tseregbaatar (MGL); Hassiatou Yahaya Aboubacar (NIG)	Mixed Team	Team Xian (MIX); L 0 – 7	did not advance			9

== Taekwondo ==
Niger was given a wild card to compete.

Boys

Athlete	Event	Round of 16	Quarterfinals	Semifinals	Final	Rank
Athlete	Event	Opposition Result	Opposition Result	Opposition Result	Opposition Result	Rank
Bachirou Tourey Gabey Mahamadou	−55 kg	E Arevalo (ECU); L 4 – 16 (PTG)	did not advance			9
