= Italy at the 2014 Summer Youth Olympics =

- IOC code: ITA
- NOC: Italian National Olympic Committee
- Website: www.coni.it

in Nanjing
- Competitors: 68 in 20 sports
- Flag bearer: Aurora Tognetti
- Medals Ranked 7th: Gold 7 Silver 8 Bronze 6 Total 21

Summer Youth Olympics appearances
- 2010; 2014; 2018; 2026

Italy competed at the 2014 Summer Youth Olympics, in Nanjing, China from 16 August to 28 August 2014.

== Archery ==
Italy qualified a male and female archer from its performance at the 2013 World Archery Youth Championships.

Individual

Athlete	Event	Ranking round		Round of 32	Round of 16	Quarterfinals	Semifinals	Final / BM	Rank
Athlete	Event	Score	Seed	Opposition Score	Opposition Score	Opposition Score	Opposition Score	Opposition Score	Rank
Elia Fregnan	Boys' Individual	667	13	Rodriguez Sas (ARG); L 0–6	did not advance				17
Tanya Giaccheri	Girls' Individual	650	8	Kazanskaya (BLR); W 6–2	Anagoz (TUR); L 2–6	did not advance			9

Team

Athletes	Event	Ranking round		Round of 32	Round of 16	Quarterfinals	Semifinals	Final / BM	Rank
Athletes	Event	Score	Seed	Opposition Score	Opposition Score	Opposition Score	Opposition Score	Opposition Score	Rank
Elia Fregnan (ITA); Jessica Sutton (AUS)	Mixed Team	1291	5	Kyaw (MYA); Choirunisa (INA); W 5-3	Peters (CAN); Tuokkola (FIN); L 0-6	did not advance			9
Tanya Giaccheri (ITA); Jose Capote (VEN)	Mixed Team	1270	26	Machado (BRA); Szafran (POL); L 3-5	did not advance				17

== Athletics ==
Italy qualified 18 athletes.

Qualification Legend: Q=Final A (medal); qB=Final B (non-medal); qC=Final C (non-medal); qD=Final D (non-medal); qE=Final E (non-medal)

Boys
Track & road events

Athlete	Event	Heats		Final	
Athlete	Event	Result	Rank	Result	Rank
Filippo Tortu	200 m	21.38 PB	6 Q	DNS	
Giacomo Brandi	10 km walk	—N/a		DNF	

Field Events

Athlete	Event	Qualification		Final	
Athlete	Event	Distance	Rank	Distance	Rank
Tobia Bocchi	Triple jump	15.37	3 Q	16.01	2nd place, silver medalist(s)
Stefano Sottile	High jump	2.03	13 qB	2.02	14
Matteo Cristoforo Capello	Pole vault	NM	qB	4.30	15
Leonardo Fabbri	Shot put	19.17 PB	6 Q	18.96	7
Jordan Zinelli	Javelin throw	64.45	14 qB	53.30	14
Tiziano di Blasio	Hammer throw	70.08	10 qB	69.58	9

Girls
Track & road events

Athlete	Event	Heats		Final	
Athlete	Event	Result	Rank	Result	Rank
Alessia Pavese	200 m	DNS		Did not advance	
Ilaria Verderio	400 m	54.18	5 Q	54.43	7
Elena Bellò	800 m	2:08.99	4 Q	2:06.31 PB	4
Chiara Ferdani	1500 m	4:25.93 PB	5 Q	4:39.88	10
Martina Millo	100 m hurdles	13.93	11 qB	14.67	12
Nicole Reina	2000 m steeplechase	6:41.64	4 Q	6:38.68	4
Noemi Stella	5 km walk	—N/a		23:38.10	3rd place, bronze medalist(s)

Field events

Athlete	Event	Qualification		Final	
Athlete	Event	Distance	Rank	Distance	Rank
Beatrice Fiorese	Long jump	6.26 PB	1 Q	6.21	2nd place, silver medalist(s)
Valentina Kalmykova	Triple jump	12.72 PB	5 Q	12.18	7
Lucia Prinetti Anzalapaya	Hammer throw	70.27 PB	2 Q	65.86	4

== Beach Volleyball ==
Italy qualified a girls' team from their performance at the 2014 CEV Youth Continental Cup Final.

Athletes	Event	Preliminary round	Standing	Round of 24	Round of 16	Quarterfinals	Semifinals	Final / BM	Rank
Athletes	Event	Opposition Score	Standing	Opposition Score	Opposition Score	Opposition Score	Opposition Score	Opposition Score	Rank
Irene Enzo; Michela Lantignotti	Girls'	Ocampo/Pacheco (ECU)	Q	Maida/Vargas (BOL); W 2 – 0	Makroguzova/Rugykh (RUS); L 0 – 2	did not advance			17
Irene Enzo; Michela Lantignotti	Girls'	Palmhert/Seebach (NAM)	Q	Maida/Vargas (BOL); W 2 – 0	Makroguzova/Rugykh (RUS); L 0 – 2	did not advance			17
Irene Enzo; Michela Lantignotti	Girls'	Lassyuta/Pimenova (KAZ)	Q	Maida/Vargas (BOL); W 2 – 0	Makroguzova/Rugykh (RUS); L 0 – 2	did not advance			17
Irene Enzo; Michela Lantignotti	Girls'	Graudina/Kravcenoka (LAT); L 0 – 2	Q	Maida/Vargas (BOL); W 2 – 0	Makroguzova/Rugykh (RUS); L 0 – 2	did not advance			17
Irene Enzo; Michela Lantignotti	Girls'	McNamara/McNamara (CAN)	Q	Maida/Vargas (BOL); W 2 – 0	Makroguzova/Rugykh (RUS); L 0 – 2	did not advance			17

== Boxing ==
Italy qualified four boxers based on its performance at the 2014 AIBA Youth World Championships

Boys

Athlete	Event	Preliminaries	Semifinals	Final / RM	Rank
Athlete	Event	Opposition Result	Opposition Result	Opposition Result	Rank
Vincenzo Arecchia	-64 kg	Petrov (UKR); W 2–1	Avcı (TUR); W 3–0	Suzuki (JPN); W w/o	1st place, gold medalist(s)
Vincenzo Lizzi	-69 kg	Kharabadze (GEO); W 2–1	Solano (DOM); L 0–3	Bronze Medal Bout Adzinayeu (BLR); W TKO	3rd place, bronze medalist(s)

Girls

Athlete	Event	Preliminaries	Semifinals	Final / RM	Rank
Athlete	Event	Opposition Result	Opposition Result	Opposition Result	Rank
Irma Testa	-51 kg	Bye	Istik (TUR); W 3–0	Chang (CHN); L 0–3	2nd place, silver medalist(s)
Monica Floridia	-60 kg	Ginty (IRL); L 0–3	Did not advance	Bout for 5th Place Bondarenko (UKR); W 2–0	5

== Canoeing ==
Italy qualified one boat based on its performance at the 2013 World Junior Canoe Sprint and Slalom Championships.

Boys

Athlete	Event	Qualification		Repechage		Round of 16		Quarterfinals	Semifinals	Final / BM	Rank
Athlete	Event	Time	Rank	Time	Rank	Time	Rank	Opposition Result	Opposition Result	Opposition Result	Rank
Luigi Ruggiero	C1 slalom	1:26.405	5 R	1:28.180	1 Q	—N/a		Roisin (FRA); L 1:31.924	did not advance		5
Luigi Ruggiero	C1 sprint	2:01.000	11 Q	—N/a		2:00.910	10	did not advance			10

== Cycling ==
Italy qualified a boys' and girls' team based on its ranking issued by the UCI.

Team

Athletes	Event	Cross-Country Eliminator		Time Trial			BMX		Cross-Country Race			Road Race			Total Pts	Rank
Athletes	Event	Rank	Points	Time	Rank	Points	Rank	Points	Time	Rank	Points	Time	Rank	Points	Total Pts	Rank
Federico Mandelli; Manuel Todaro	Boys' Team	4	50	5:20.91	13	4	6	60	58:27	8	20	1:37:42; 1:37:29	39; 23	0	134	10
Sofia Beggin; Chiara Teocchi	Girls' Team	5	40	6:03.70	4	50	12	12	45:19	2	80	1:12:36; 1:12:36	3; 16	66	248	1st place, gold medalist(s)

Mixed Relay

Athletes	Event	Cross-Country Girls' Race	Cross-Country Boys' Race	Boys' Road Race	Girls' Road Race	Total Time	Rank
Chiara Teocchi; Federico Mandelli; Manuel Todaro; Sofia Beggin	Mixed Team Relay					17:31	2nd place, silver medalist(s)

== Diving ==
Italy qualified two quotas based on its performance at the Nanjing 2014 Diving Qualifying Event.

Athlete	Event	Preliminary		Final	
Athlete	Event	Points	Rank	Points	Rank
Giacomo Ciammarughi	Boys' 3 m springboard	443.10	12	448.20	11
Laura Bilotta	Girls' 3 m springboard	400.50	6	409.60	5
Laura Bilotta (ITA); Lev Sargsyan (ARM)	Mixed team	—N/a		348.60	4

== Equestrian ==
Italy qualified a rider.

Athlete	Horse	Event	Round 1		Round 2			Total	
Athlete	Horse	Event	Penalties	Rank	Penalties	Total	Rank	Penalties	Rank
Matias Alvaro	Montelini	Individual Jumping	1	10					
Europe; Jake Saywell (GBR); Michael Duffy (IRL); Matias Alvaro (ITA); Lisa Nooren (NED); Filip Agren (SWE)	Galaxy; Commander; Montelini; For The Sun; Abel	Team Jumping	(8); 0; 0 (8); 0 (0); 0; 0 (0); 0	1	(4); 0; 0 (0); 0 (0); 0; 0 (0); 0		1	0	1st place, gold medalist(s)

== Fencing ==
Italy qualified five athletes based on its performance at the 2014 FIE Cadet World Championships.

Boys

Athlete	Event	Pool Round	Seed	Round of 16	Quarterfinals	Semifinals	Final / BM	Rank
Athlete	Event	Opposition Score	Seed	Opposition Score	Opposition Score	Opposition Score	Opposition Score	Rank
Riccardo Abate	Épée	Pool 2 Yoo (USA); L 0–5; Ogilvie (NZL) Kim (KOR) Elsayed (EGY) French (CAN)	5	Esztergalyos (HUN); L 12–13	did not advance			11
Guillaume Bianchi	Foil	Heroui (ALG) El-Choueiri (LIB); W 5–1; M Seo (KOR) C Choi (HKG) M Huang (CHN) A Rzadkowski (POL)		Heroui (ALG); W 15–6				

Girls

Athlete	Event	Pool Round	Seed	Round of 16	Quarterfinals	Semifinals	Final / BM	Rank
Athlete	Event	Opposition Score	Seed	Opposition Score	Opposition Score	Opposition Score	Opposition Score	Rank
Eleonora De Marchi	Épée	Pool 1 Nixon (USA); L 4–5; Simms-Lymn (JAM) Yoshimura (JPN) Brovko (UKR)	2	Bye	Mroszczak (POL); W 15–10	Nixon (USA); W 15–11	Lee (KOR); L 13–15	2nd place, silver medalist(s)
Claudia Borella	Foil	Zhao (CAN) Elsharkawy (EGY) Martyanova (RUS) Choi (HKG) Szymczak (POL) Kontochristopoulou (GRE)						
Chiara Crovari	Sabre	Záhonyi (HUN) Jeon (KOR) Toledo (MEX) Colon (PUR) Boungab (ALG)		Boungab (ALG); W 15–10			Moseyko (RUS); L	2nd place, silver medalist(s)

Mixed Team

Athletes	Event	Round of 16	Quarterfinals	Semifinals / PM	Final / PM	Rank
Athletes	Event	Opposition Score	Opposition Score	Opposition Score	Opposition Score	Rank
Europe 1 Patrik Esztergályos; Hungary; Marta Martyanova; Russia; Ivan Ilin; Russia; Eleonora De Marchi; Italy; Andrzej Rządkowski; Poland; Alina Moseyko; Russia	Mixed Team		Americas 2 W 30–29	Asia-Oceania 2 W	Asia-Oceania 1 L	2nd place, silver medalist(s)
Europe 2 Chiara Crovari; Italy; Marios Giakoumatos; Greece; Linus Islas Flygare; Sweden; Åsa Linde; Sweden; Enguerand Roger; France; Anna Szymczak; Poland	Mixed Team	Bye	Americas 1 W 30–24	Asia-Oceania 1 L 29–30	Asia-Oceania 2 W 30–25	3rd place, bronze medalist(s)
Europe 4 Theodora Gkountoura (GRE); Claudia Borella (ITA); Inna Brovko (UKR); Tudor Cucu (ROU); Petar Files (CRO); Samuel Unterhauser (GER)	Team	Bye	Asia-Oceania 1 L 22–30	America 1 W 30–27	America 2 L 28–30	6

== Golf ==
Italy qualified one team of two athletes based on the 8 June 2014 IGF Combined World Amateur Golf Rankings.

Individual

Athlete	Event	Round 1		Round 2			Round 3			Total	
Athlete	Event	Score	Rank	Score	Total	Rank	Score	Total	Rank	Score	Rank
Renato Paratore	Boys	72	17	67	139	5	66	205	1	205 (-6)	1st place, gold medalist(s)
Virginia Carta	Girls	69	1	75	144	6	70	214	4	214 (-2)	=4

Team

Athletes	Event	Round 1 (Foursome)		Round 2 (Fourball)			Round 3 (Individual Stroke)				Total	
Athletes	Event	Score	Rank	Score	Total	Rank	Boy	Girl	Total	Rank	Score	Rank
Renato Paratore; Virginia Carta	Mixed	62 (-10)	2	72 (PAR)	134 (-10)	6	70	70	140 (-4)	3	274 (-14)	3rd place, bronze medalist(s)

== Gymnastics ==
=== Artistic Gymnastics ===
Italy qualified athlete based on its performance at the 2014 European WAG Championships.

Girls

Athlete	Event	Apparatus				Total	Rank
Athlete	Event	V	UB	BB	F	Total	Rank
Iosra Abdelaziz	Qualification	14.000 6 Q	13.100 2 Q	13.250 4 Q	12.800 4 Q	53.150	5 Q
Iosra Abdelaziz	All-Around	13.750	13.350	12.500	12.950	52.550	6
Iosra Abdelaziz	Uneven Bars	—N/a				13.366	2nd place, silver medalist(s)
Iosra Abdelaziz	Balance Beam	—N/a				12.933	4
Iosra Abdelaziz	Floor	—N/a				12.933	6

== Judo ==
Italy qualified two athletes based on its performance at the 2013 Cadet World Judo Championships.

Individual

Athlete	Event	Round of 32	Round of 16	Quarterfinals	Semifinals	Rep 1	Rep 2	Rep 3	Rep 4	Final / BM	Rank
Athlete	Event	Opposition Result	Opposition Result	Opposition Result	Opposition Result	Opposition Result	Opposition Result	Opposition Result	Opposition Result	Opposition Result	Rank
Elios Manzi	Boys' -66 kg	Rebahi (ALG); W 000-000	Gonzalez (VEN); L 000-010	did not advance		Miles (GBR); W 000-000	Florimont (FRA); W 100-000	Wu (CHN); L 000-010	did not advance		11
Chiara Carminucci	Girls' -63 kg	—N/a	Carabalí (COL); L 000-001	did not advance		—N/a	Banda (ZAM); L 000-010	did not advance			15

Team

Athletes	Event	Round of 16	Quarterfinals	Semifinals	Final	Rank
Athletes	Event	Opposition Result	Opposition Result	Opposition Result	Opposition Result	Rank
Team Xian; Hifumi Abe (JPN); Chiara Carminucci (ITA); Naomi de Brune (AUS); Jolan Florimont (FRA); Brillith Gamarra (PER); Felix Penning (LUX); Marusa Stangar (SLO); Idan Vardi (ISR)	Mixed Team	Team Tani (MIX); W 7 – 0	Team Berghmans (MIX); W 4 – 3	Team Rouge (MIX); L 3 – 4	Did not advance	3rd place, bronze medalist(s)

== Modern Pentathlon ==
Italy qualified one athlete based on its performance at the European YOG Qualifiers and another based on its performance at the 2014 Youth A World Championships.

Athlete	Event	Fencing Ranking Round (épée one touch)		Swimming (200 m freestyle)			Fencing Final Round (épée one touch)			Combined: Shooting/Running (10 m air pistol)/(3000 m)			Total Points	Final Rank
Athlete	Event	Results	Rank	Time	Rank	Points	Results	Rank	Points	Time	Rank	Points	Total Points	Final Rank
Gianluca Micozzi	Boys' Individual		3										1123	7
Aurora Tognetti	Girls' Individual				2	292								10
Unknown; Gianluca Micozzi (ITA)	Mixed Relay													
Aurora Tognetti (ITA); Gilung Park (KOR)	Mixed Relay				8	335					3			3rd place, bronze medalist(s)

== Rowing ==
Italy qualified two boats based on its performance at the 2013 World Rowing Junior Championships.

Athlete	Event	Heats		Repechage		Semifinals		Final	
Athlete	Event	Time	Rank	Time	Rank	Time	Rank	Time	Rank
Riccardo Mager; Riccardo Peretti	Boys' Pairs	3:16.01	4 R	3:15.93	4 FB	—N/a		3:21.87	9
Arianna Mazzoni	Girls' Single Sculls	3:56.16	3 R	3:58.44	3 SC/D	3:55.69	1 FC	4:03.20	16

Qualification Legend: FA=Final A (medal); FB=Final B (non-medal); FC=Final C (non-medal); FD=Final D (non-medal); SA/B=Semifinals A/B; SC/D=Semifinals C/D; R=Repechage

== Sailing ==
Italy qualified four boats based on its performance at the Byte CII European Continental Qualifiers and Techno 293 European Continental Qualifiers.

Athlete	Event	Race											Net Points	Final Rank
Athlete	Event	1	2	3	4	5	6	7	8	9	10	M*	Net Points	Final Rank
Vittorio Gallinaro	Boys' Byte CII	17	23	6	19	22	(24)	8	10	Cancelled		129.00	105.00	18
Ruggero Lo Mauro	Boys' Techno 293	(14)	8	8	10	8	9	13	Cancelled			70.00	56.00	9
Carolina Albano	Girls' Byte CII	5	7	12	8	3	9	(31); DNS	25	Cancelled		100.00	69.00	8
Giulia Alagna	Girls' Techno 293	10	1	9	7	(11)	10	16	Cancelled			64.00	53.00	11

== Shooting ==
Italy was given a wild card to compete.

Individual

Athlete	Event	Qualification		Final	
Athlete	Event	Points	Rank	Points	Rank
Marco Suppini	Boys' 10m Air Rifle	614.9	6 Q	122.2	6

Team

Athletes	Event	Qualification		Round of 16	Quarterfinals	Semifinals	Final / BM	Rank
Athletes	Event	Points	Rank	Opposition Result	Opposition Result	Opposition Result	Opposition Result	Rank
Marco Suppini (ITA); Yasmin Tahlak (UAE)	Mixed Team 10m Air Rifle	817.2	8 Q	L Decicilia (ARG); J Budde (GER); L 4 – 10	did not advance			17

== Swimming ==
Italy qualified eight swimmers.

Boys

Athlete	Event	Heat		Semifinal		Final	
Athlete	Event	Time	Rank	Time	Rank	Time	Rank
Alessandro Bori	50 m freestyle	22.93	4 Q	22.87	8 Q	22.66	4
Alessandro Bori	100 m freestyle	50.35	3 Q	49.91	3 Q	49.65	4
Nicolangelo Di Fabio	100 m freestyle	50.83	12 Q	50.64	10	did not advance	
Nicolangelo Di Fabio	200 m freestyle	1:50.08	1 Q	—N/a		1:48.45	1st place, gold medalist(s)
Nicolangelo Di Fabio	400 m freestyle	—N/a					
Simone Sabbioni	50 m backstroke	25.90	3 Q	25.40	1 Q	25.47	3rd place, bronze medalist(s)
Simone Sabbioni	100 m backstroke	55.47	3 Q	54.48	1 Q	54.24	1st place, gold medalist(s)
Simone Sabbioni	200 m backstroke	2:02.51	7 Q	—N/a		2:00.33	6
Giacomo Carini	50 m butterfly	25.74	28	did not advance			
Giacomo Carini	100 m butterfly	55.01	10 Q	54.69	11	did not advance	
Giacomo Carini	200 m butterfly	1:59.83	4 Q	—N/a		1:58.14	3rd place, bronze medalist(s)
Giacomo Carini	200 m individual medley	DNS		—N/a		did not advance	
Alessandro Bori; Giacomo Carini; Nicolangelo di Fabio; Simone Sabbioni	4 × 100 m freestyle relay	3:24.98	2 Q	—N/a		3:22.29	2nd place, silver medalist(s)

Girls

Athlete	Event	Heat		Semifinal		Final	
Athlete	Event	Time	Rank	Time	Rank	Time	Rank
Rachele Ceracchi	50 m freestyle	26.46	16 Q	26.20	14	did not advance	
Rachele Ceracchi	100 m freestyle	55.81	4 Q	56.22	12	did not advance	
Rachele Ceracchi	200 m freestyle	2:01.32	6 Q	—N/a		2:01.32	7
Simona Quadarella	400 m freestyle	4:15.40	7 Q	—N/a		4:15.05	6
Simona Quadarella	800 m freestyle	—N/a				8:35.39	1st place, gold medalist(s)
Ambra Esposito	50 m backstroke	30.47	29	did not advance			
Ambra Esposito	100 m backstroke	1:02.37	6 Q	1:02.22	6 Q	1:02.55	8
Ambra Esposito	200 m backstroke	2:13.00	3 Q	—N/a		2:10.42	1st place, gold medalist(s)
Claudia Tarzia	50 m butterfly	28.10	17	did not advance			
Claudia Tarzia	100 m butterfly	1:00.08	3 Q	1:00.26	5 Q	59.38	4
Claudia Tarzia	200 m butterfly	2:15.32	11	—N/a		did not advance	

Mixed

Athlete	Event	Heat		Final	
Athlete	Event	Time	Rank	Time	Rank
Alessandro Bori; Rachele Ceracchi; Nicolangelo di Fabio; Claudia Tarzia	4 × 100 m freestyle relay	—N/a			

== Table Tennis ==
Italy qualified one athlete based on its performance at the Road to Nanjing series.

Singles

Athlete	Event	Group Stage	Rank	Round of 16	Quarterfinals	Semifinals	Final / BM	Rank
Athlete	Event	Opposition Score	Rank	Opposition Score	Opposition Score	Opposition Score	Opposition Score	Rank
Giorgia Piccolin	Girls	Group B Liu (CHN); L 0 - 3	3 qB	Seera (UGA); W w/o			Wan (GER); L 0 - 3	18
Giorgia Piccolin	Girls	Salah (DJI); W 3 – 0	3 qB	Seera (UGA); W w/o			Wan (GER); L 0 - 3	18
Giorgia Piccolin	Girls	Mukherjee (IND); L 1 – 3	3 qB	Seera (UGA); W w/o			Wan (GER); L 0 - 3	18

Team

Athletes	Event	Group Stage	Rank	Round of 16	Quarterfinals	Semifinals	Final / BM	Rank
Athletes	Event	Opposition Score	Rank	Opposition Score	Opposition Score	Opposition Score	Opposition Score	Rank
Europe 3 Giorgia Piccolin (ITA); Elia Schmid (SUI)	Mixed	Latin America 1 Lorenzotti (URU); Calderano (BRA); L 1–3	3 qB	Intercontinental 2 Dong (NZL); Johnson (SKN); W 2–0				
Europe 3 Giorgia Piccolin (ITA); Elia Schmid (SUI)	Mixed	Africa 1 Lagsir (ALG); Yahia (TUN); W 3–0	3 qB	Intercontinental 2 Dong (NZL); Johnson (SKN); W 2–0				
Europe 3 Giorgia Piccolin (ITA); Elia Schmid (SUI)	Mixed	Germany; Wan (GER); Ort (GER); L 0–3	3 qB	Intercontinental 2 Dong (NZL); Johnson (SKN); W 2–0				

Qualification Legend: Q=Main Bracket (medal); qB=Consolation Bracket (non-medal)

== Taekwondo ==
Italy qualified two athletes based on its performance at the Taekwondo Qualification Tournament.

Girls

Athlete	Event	Round of 16	Quarterfinals	Semifinals	Final	Rank
Athlete	Event	Opposition Result	Opposition Result	Opposition Result	Opposition Result	Rank
Licia Martignani	−55 kg	Yeşildaş (AZE); W 0 (SUP) - 0	Roebben (BEL); L 7 - 8	did not advance		5
Marina Rizzelli	+63 kg	Yount (USA); L 3 - 4	did not advance			9

== Triathlon ==
Italy qualified one athlete based on its performance at the 2014 European Youth Olympic Games Qualifier.

Individual

Athlete	Event	Swim (750m)	Trans 1	Bike (20km)	Trans 2	Run (5km)	Total Time	Rank
Giulio Soldati	Boys	09:20	00:40	29:02	00:25	16:13	0:55:40	7

Relay

Athlete	Event	Total Times per Athlete (Swim 250m, Bike 6.6km, Run 1.8km)	Total Group Time	Rank
Europe 3 Sian Rainsley (GBR); Giulio Soldati (ITA); Carmen Gomez Cortes (ESP); Bence Lehmann (HUN)	Mixed Relay	21:23; 20:01; 21:23; 19:43	1:22:30	2nd place, silver medalist(s)

== Weightlifting ==
Italy qualified 1 quota in the boys' and girls' events based on the team ranking after the 2014 Weightlifting Youth European Championships.

Boys

Athlete	Event	Snatch		Clean & jerk		Total	Rank
Athlete	Event	Result	Rank	Result	Rank	Total	Rank
Mirko Zanni	−62 kg	120	1	135	6	255	3rd place, bronze medalist(s)

Girls

Athlete	Event	Snatch		Clean & jerk		Total	Rank
Athlete	Event	Result	Rank	Result	Rank	Total	Rank
Alessandra Pagliaro	−48 kg	61	8	72	9	133	9
