= Emma Ekenman-Fernis =

Swedish handball player (born 1996)

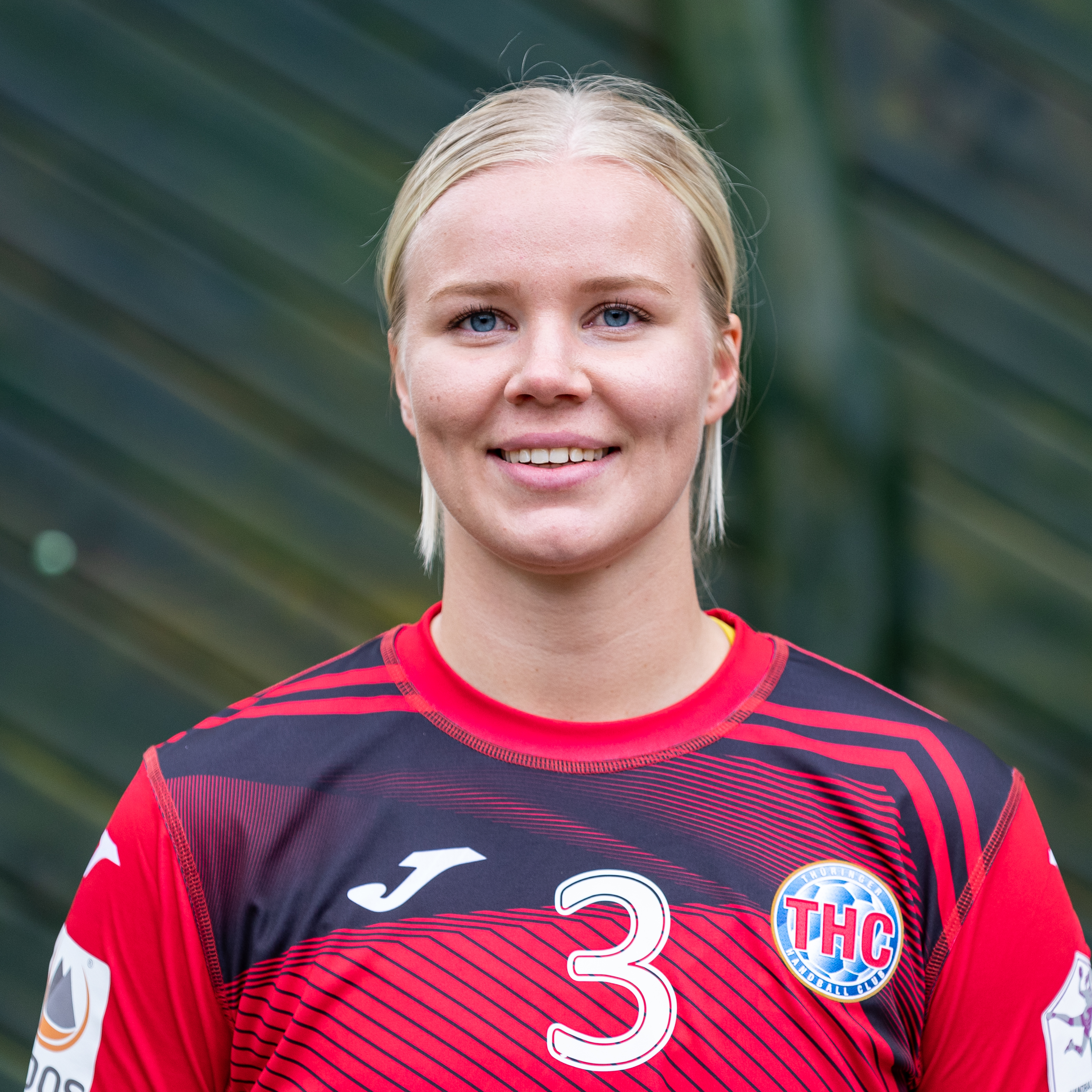

Personal information
- Nationality: Swedish
- Born: 24 July 1996 (age 30) Stockholm, Sweden
- Height: 1.72 m (5 ft 8 in)

Sport
- Sport: Handball
- Position: Right wing
- Current club: Lugi HF
- Number: 5

Senior clubs
- Years: Team
- 2015–2020: IK Sävehof
- 2020–2022: Thüringer HC
- 2022–: Lugi HF
National team
Years	Team	Apps	(Gls)
2016–	Sweden	28	(39)
Medal record
Youth European Championship
Gold medal – first place	2013 Poland
Youth Olympic Games
Bronze medal – third place	2014 Nanjing

Emma Ekenman-Fernis (born 24 July 1996) is a Swedish handball player for Lugi HF and the Swedish national team.

== Individual awards ==
- All-Star Team as best Right wing at the Youth European Championship 2013
