= Emma Rask =

Swedish handball player (born 1996)

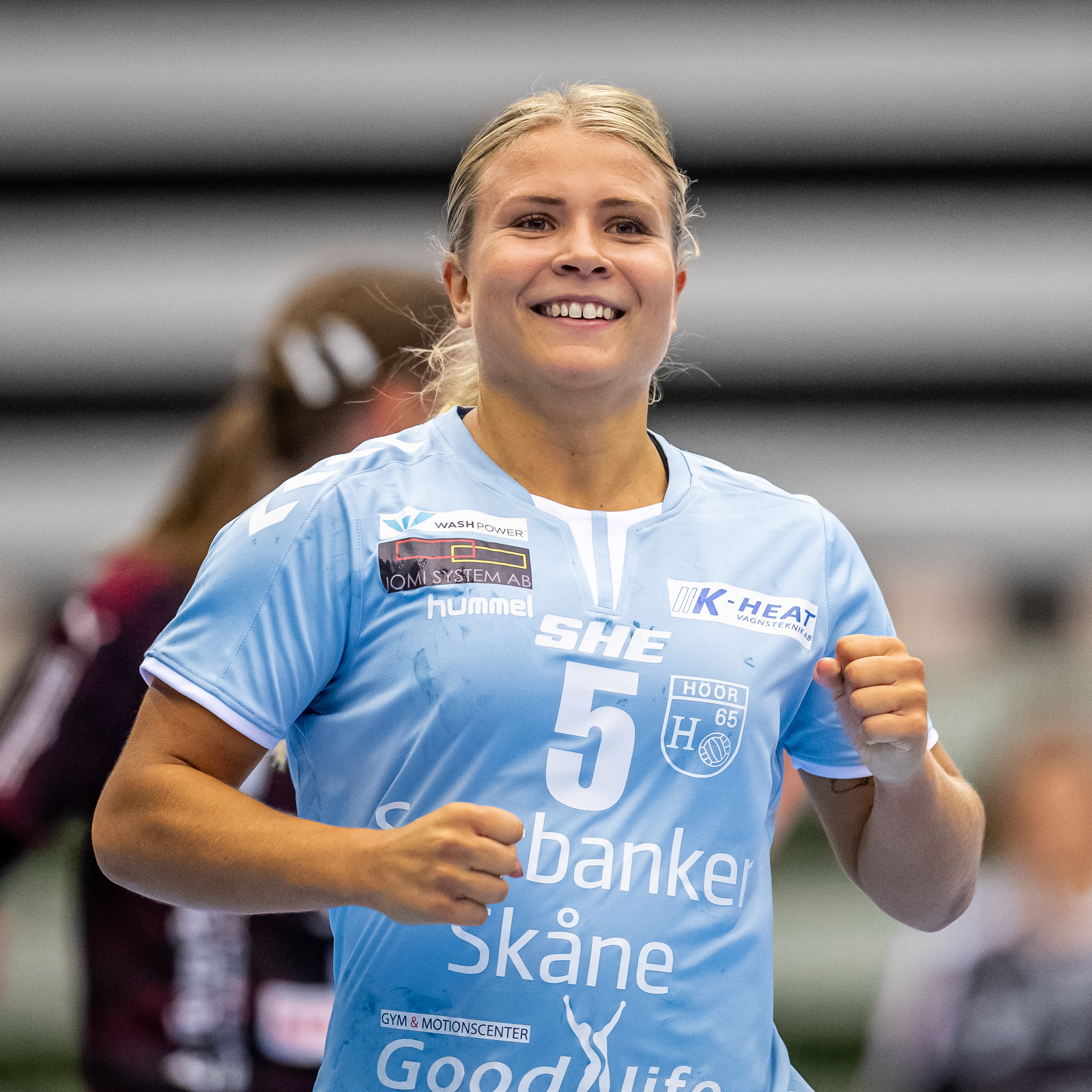

Personal information
- Nationality: Swedish
- Born: 17 January 1996 (age 30) Höör, Sweden
- Height: 1.61 m (5 ft 3 in)

Sport
- Sport: Handball
- Position: Left wing
- Current club: H 65 Höör

Senior clubs
- Years: Team
- 2015–2022: H 65 Höör
- 2023–: H 65 Höör
National team
Years	Team	Apps	(Gls)
2019–2021	Sweden	14	(21)
Medal record
Youth Olympic Games
Bronze medal – third place	2014 Nanjing

Emma Rask (born 1 January 1996) is a Swedish handballer for H 65 Höör and the Swedish national team. She announced she's taking a break from handball in 2022. In september 2023 she made a comeback in H65 Höör after multiple injuries in the squad.

She represented Sweden at the 2020 European Women's Handball Championship.

== Achievements ==
- Swedish League:
  - Winner: 2017
- EHF Challenge Cup:
  - Finalist: 2017
