= Hanna Blomstrand =

Swedish handball player (born 1996)

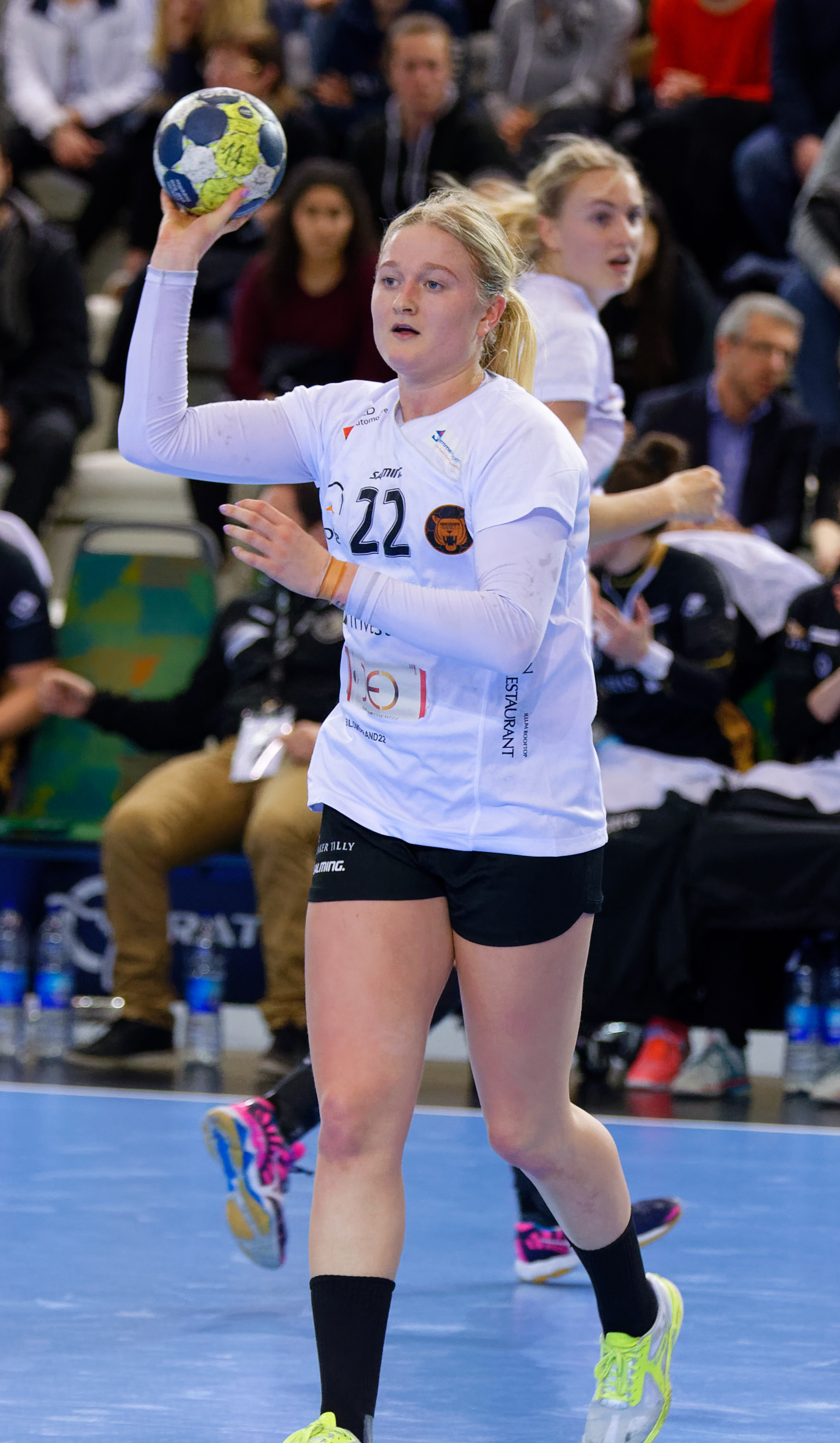
- Blomstrand in 2018

Personal information
- Nationality: Swedish
- Born: 25 August 1996 (age 30) Bosjökloster, Sweden
- Height: 1.73 m (5 ft 8 in)

Sport
- Sport: Handball
- Position: Right back

Senior clubs
- Years: Team
- 2012: H 65 Höör
- 2012–2017: Lugi HF
- 2017–2022: København Håndbold
National team
| Years | Team | Apps | (Gls) |
| 2016–2022 | Sweden | 62 | (96) |
Medal record
Youth Olympic Games
| Bronze medal – third place | 2014 Nanjing |

Hanna Blomstrand (born 25 August 1996) is a Swedish former handball player for København Håndbold and the Swedish national team.

== Career ==
She began playing handball in H 65 Höör, a Swedish club which won the national championship 2016. In the Swedish championship for youth, she won the title for girls born 1996, 16 years old. After that she moved to Lugi HF 2012, where she played to 2017. In 2017, she became professional handball player in the Danish club København Håndbold. In her first season, she won the Danish Championship, which was the first in club history. In 2022 she had to retire at the age of only 25 due to injuries.

=== National teams ===
She has been playing for the national youth team in Sweden and won a gold medal in 2013 EM and the next year bronze medal in youth Olympics in China. In 2015, she won bronze in U-19 team in EM. In season 2015–2016, she was second in list of goal-scorers, and in summer 2016, she began playing for the national team instead of the youth team. In the summer Olympics 2016, she only played one match after an injury of another player. But she was also playing in EM 2016 in Sweden where she played in several matches. In the 2017 World Championship, she was a more important player, and in quarterfinal against Denmark, she became player of the match after 7 goals on seven shots.

== Achievements ==
- Swedish championship: 2013 Silver with Lugi HF
- Danish Championship: 2018 with København Håndbold
- U-17 EM 2013 Gold with Swedish team
- Youth OS 2014 Brons with Swedish team
- U-19 EM 2015 Brons with Swedish team
