= Taekwondo at the 2014 Summer Youth Olympics =

Taekwondo at the II Summer Youth Olympic Games
- Venue: Nanjing International Expo Center
- Dates: 17–21 August
- No. of events: 10 (5 boys, 5 girls)

Taekwondo at the 2014 Summer Youth Olympics was held from 17 to 21 August at the Nanjing International Expo Center in Nanjing, China. There will be five weight classes for each gender.

== Qualification ==
Each National Olympic Committee (NOC) can enter a maximum of 6 competitors, 3 per each gender. 74 places will be decided in a qualification tournament held in Taipei at 20–21 March 2014. The top 7 of each weight category and the eighth places in the events China did not choose to participate in will qualify. As hosts, China was initially given the maximum quota, but has chosen to participate only in the boys' +73 kg and girls' -49 kg, -63 kg, +63 kg weight categories. A further 20, 10 in each gender will be decided by the Tripartite Commission.

To be eligible to participate at the Youth Olympics athletes must have been born between 1 January 1997 and 31 December 1999. Furthermore, all athletes must be a Kukkiwon Dan or Poom certificate holder.

NOC	Boys					Girls					Total
NOC	48 kg	55 kg	63 kg	73 kg	+73 kg	44 kg	49 kg	55 kg	63 kg	+63 kg	Total
Afghanistan						X					1
Argentina	X										1
Austria			X								1
Azerbaijan				X		X	X	X			4
Belgium		X					X	X	X		4
Bosnia and Herzegovina							X				1
Brazil			X							X	2
Cameroon									X		1
Canada				X							1
Cape Verde										X	1
Chile		X									1
China					X		X		X	X	4
Colombia				X					X		2
Democratic Republic of the Congo								X			1
Croatia								X	X		2
Czech Republic								X			1
Ecuador		X									1
Egypt		X		X	X				X		4
Equatorial Guinea		X									1
France	X				X						2
Gabon		X									1
Germany	X			X		X		X			4
Great Britain			X			X					2
Iran	X			X					X		3
Italy								X		X	2
Ivory Coast	X										1
Jordan						X			X		2
Kazakhstan	X										1
South Korea		X									1
Lebanon		X									1
Malaysia									X		1
Mali								X			1
Mauritania		X									1
Mexico			X			X	X			X	4
Montenegro					X						1
Morocco				X							1
Netherlands	X	X	X								3
Niger		X									1
Poland							X				1
Puerto Rico										X	1
Romania					X						1
Russia			X					X	X		3
Saudi Arabia	X										1
Senegal										X	1
Serbia			X		X			X			3
Slovenia					X						1
Spain		X									1
Suriname			X								1
Swaziland										X	1
Sweden							X				1
Chinese Taipei	X	X	X			X	X				5
Thailand	X					X					2
Turkey					X		X	X			3
Ukraine				X	X					X	3
United States										X	1
Uzbekistan										X	1
Vietnam						X					1
Yemen	X										1
58 NOCs	11	13	9	8	9	9	9	11	10	11	100

== Schedule ==
The schedule was released by the Nanjing Youth Olympic Games Organizing Committee.

All times are CST (UTC+8)

Event date	Event day	Starting time	Event details
August 17	Sunday	14:00	Girls' -44 kg Preliminaries & Quarterfinals; Boys' -48 kg Preliminaries & Quarterfinals
August 17	Sunday	19:00	Girls' -44 kg Semifinals & Finals; Boys' -48 kg Semifinals & Finals
August 18	Monday	14:00	Girls' -49 kg Preliminaries & Quarterfinals; Boys' -55 kg Preliminaries & Quarterfinals
August 18	Monday	19:00	Girls' -49 kg Semifinals & Finals; Boys' -55 kg Semifinals & Finals
August 19	Tuesday	14:00	Girls' -55 kg Preliminaries & Quarterfinals; Boys' -63 kg Preliminaries & Quarterfinals
August 19	Tuesday	19:00	Girls' -55 kg Semifinals & Finals; Boys' -63 kg Semifinals & Finals
August 20	Wednesday	14:00	Girls' -63 kg Preliminaries & Quarterfinals; Boys' -73 kg Preliminaries & Quarterfinals
August 20	Wednesday	19:00	Girls' -63 kg Semifinals & Finals; Boys' -73 kg Semifinals & Finals
August 21	Thursday	14:00	Girls' +63 kg Preliminaries & Quarterfinals; Boys' +73 kg Preliminaries & Quarterfinals
August 21	Thursday	19:00	Girls' +63 kg Semifinals & Finals; Boys' +73 kg Semifinals & Finals

== Medal summary ==
=== Medal table ===
* Host nation (China)

Rank	Nation	Gold	Silver	Bronze	Total
1	Chinese Taipei	2	1	1	4
2	Iran	2	0	1	3
3	Azerbaijan	1	1	0	2
4	France	1	0	1	2
5	Brazil	1	0	0	1
5	Croatia	1	0	0	1
5	Thailand	1	0	0	1
5	United States	1	0	0	1
9	Belgium	0	1	2	3
10	Germany	0	1	1	2
10	Mexico	0	1	1	2
10	Russia	0	1	1	2
10	Turkey	0	1	1	2
10	Ukraine	0	1	1	2
15	South Korea	0	1	0	1
15	Uzbekistan	0	1	0	1
17	China*	0	0	4	4
18	Great Britain	0	0	2	2
19	Colombia	0	0	1	1
19	Egypt	0	0	1	1
19	Netherlands	0	0	1	1
19	Spain	0	0	1	1
Totals (22 entries)		10	10	20	40

=== Boys' events ===
Event	Gold	Silver	Bronze
48 kg	Mehdi Eshaghi; Iran	Wang Chen-yu; Chinese Taipei	Daniel Chiovetta; Germany
48 kg	Mehdi Eshaghi; Iran	Wang Chen-yu; Chinese Taipei	Stéphane Audibert; France
55 kg	Huang Yu-jen; Chinese Taipei	Joo Dong-hun; South Korea	Si Mohamed Ketbi; Belgium
55 kg	Huang Yu-jen; Chinese Taipei	Joo Dong-hun; South Korea	Jesús Tortosa; Spain
63 kg	Edival Pontes; Brazil	José Rubén Nava; Mexico	Nabil Ennadiri; Netherlands
63 kg	Edival Pontes; Brazil	José Rubén Nava; Mexico	Christian McNeish; Great Britain
73 kg	Said Guliyev; Azerbaijan	Hamza Adnan-Karim; Germany	Seif Eissa; Egypt
73 kg	Said Guliyev; Azerbaijan	Hamza Adnan-Karim; Germany	Danial Salehimehr; Iran
+73 kg	Yoann Miangué; France	Denys Voronovskyy; Ukraine	Talha Bayram; Turkey
+73 kg	Yoann Miangué; France	Denys Voronovskyy; Ukraine	Liun Jintao; China

=== Girls' events ===
Event	Gold	Silver	Bronze
44 kg	Panipak Wongpattanakit; Thailand	Ceren Ozbek; Azerbaijan	Chen Zih-ting; Chinese Taipei
44 kg	Panipak Wongpattanakit; Thailand	Ceren Ozbek; Azerbaijan	Abigail Stones; Great Britain
49 kg	Huang Huai-hsuan; Chinese Taipei	Indra Craen; Belgium	Zhan Tianrui; China
49 kg	Huang Huai-hsuan; Chinese Taipei	Indra Craen; Belgium	Mitzi Carrillo; Mexico
55 kg	Ivana Babić; Croatia	Fatma Sarıdoğan; Turkey	Tatiana Kudashova; Russia
55 kg	Ivana Babić; Croatia	Fatma Sarıdoğan; Turkey	Laura Roebben; Belgium
63 kg	Kimia Alizadeh; Iran	Yulia Turutina; Russia	Zhang Chen; China
63 kg	Kimia Alizadeh; Iran	Yulia Turutina; Russia	Debbie Yopasa; Colombia
+63 kg	Kendall Yount; United States	Umida Abdullaeva; Uzbekistan	Li Chen; China
+63 kg	Kendall Yount; United States	Umida Abdullaeva; Uzbekistan	Yulia Miiuts; Ukraine
