= Athletics at the 2014 Summer Youth Olympics – Girls' 400 metre hurdles =

Athletics – Girls' 400 metres hurdles at the II Summer Youth Olympic Games
- Venue: Nanjing Olympic Sports Centre
- Date: August 22–25
- Competitors: 16 from 16 nations

Medalists
1st place, gold medalist(s)		Gezelle Magerman	South Africa
2nd place, silver medalist(s)		Michaela Peskova	Slovakia
3rd place, bronze medalist(s)		Anne Sofie Kirkegaard	Denmark

The girls’ 400 metre hurdles competition at the 2014 Summer Youth Olympics was held on 22–25 August 2014 in Nanjing Olympic Sports Center.

== Schedule ==
Date	Time	Round
22 August 2014	18:55	Heats
25 August 2014	19:20	Final

== Results ==
=== Heats ===
Eight fastest athletes advanced to Final A, the others advanced to Final B according to their times.

Rank	Heat	Lane	Athlete	Result	Notes	Q
1	2	7	Gezelle Magerman (RSA)	58.57	PB	FA
2	2	2	Eileen Demes (GER)	58.68	PB	FA
3	1	2	Michaela Peskova (SVK)	59.44		FA
4	2	4	Anne Sofie Kirkegaard (DEN)	59.92		FA
5	1	9	Shanice Cohen (JAM)	1:00.24		FA
6	2	3	Tereza Vokálová (CZE)	1:00.36		FA
7	1	8	Alexandra Aitken (CAN)	1:00.41		FA
8	1	4	Michelle Müller (SUI)	1:00.60		FA
9	1	5	Paola Morán (MEX)	1:00.93	PB	FB
10	1	6	Coralie Gassama (FRA)	1:01.03		FB
11	1	3	Maria Letícia Peres (BRA)	1:01.52	PB	FB
12	2	5	Dreshannae Rolle (BAH)	1:02.01		FB
13	2	9	Keysha Dumeng (PUR)	1:02.21	PB	FB
14	2	8	Anastasiya Sergeyeva (KAZ)	1:02.95	PB	FB
15	2	6	Safa Malik (SUD)	1:03.02		FB
16	1	7	Leyka Itzel Archibold (PAN)	1:04.51	SB	FB

=== Finals ===
==== Final A ====
Rank	Final Placing	Lane	Athlete	Result	Notes
1st place, gold medalist(s)	1	4	Gezelle Magerman (RSA)	57.91	PB
2nd place, silver medalist(s)	2	5	Michaela Peskova (SVK)	58.26	PB
3rd place, bronze medalist(s)	3	6	Anne Sofie Kirkegaard (DEN)	58.60	PB
4	4	8	Tereza Vokálová (CZE)	59.76	PB
5	5	3	Michelle Müller (SUI)	59.86	
6	6	2	Alexandra Aitken (CAN)	1:00.27	
7	7	9	Shanice Cohen (JAM)	1:03.06	
8	8	7	Eileen Demes (GER)	1:10.21	

==== Final B ====
Rank	Final Placing	Lane	Athlete	Result	Notes
1	9	4	Paola Morán (MEX)	59.74	PB
2	10	6	Coralie Gassama (FRA)	1:00.87	
3	11	7	Maria Letícia Peres (BRA)	1:02.28	
4	12	5	Dreshannae Rolle (BAH)	1:02.34	
5	13	8	Keysha Dumeng (PUR)	1:02.63	
6	14	9	Anastasiya Sergeyeva (KAZ)	1:02.66	PB
7	15	2	Leyka Itzel Archibold (PAN)	1:04.13	SB
8	16	3	Safa Malik (SUD)	1:04.18	
