= Athletics at the 2014 Summer Youth Olympics – Boys' 2000 metre steeplechase =

Athletics – Boys' 2000 metres steeplechase at the II Summer Youth Olympic Games
- Venue: Nanjing Olympic Sports Centre
- Date: August 21–25
- Competitors: 15 from 15 nations

Medalists
| 1st place, gold medalist(s) | | Wogene Sidamo | Ethiopia |
| 2nd place, silver medalist(s) | | Amos Kirui | Kenya |
| 3rd place, bronze medalist(s) | | Hicham Chemlal | Morocco |

The boys’ 2000 metres steeplechase competition at the 2014 Summer Youth Olympics was held on 21–25 August 2014 in Nanjing Olympic Sports Center.

== Schedule ==
| Date | Time | Round |
|---|---|---|
| 21 August 2014 | 19:00 | Heat |
| 25 August 2014 | 20:50 | Final |

== Results ==
=== Heat ===
First 50% of the athletes from the Qualification round progress to the A Final and the remaining athletes to the B Final.

| Rank | Lane | Athlete | Result | Notes | Q |
|---|---|---|---|---|---|
| 1 | 1 | Wegene Sidamo (ETH) | 5:34.24 | PB | FA |
| 2 | 9 | Hicham Chemlal (MAR) | 5:39.60 | | FA |
| 3 | 12 | Amos Kirui (KEN) | 5:41.70 | | FA |
| 4 | 5 | Ahmed Saidia (ALG) | 5:41.73 | PB | FA |
| 5 | 8 | Soufien Cherni (TUN) | 5:41.81 | PB | FA |
| 6 | 7 | Anthony Pontier (FRA) | 5:45.35 | PB | FA |
| 7 | 6 | Amedee Manirakiza (BDI) | 5:45.54 | PB | FA |
| 8 | 15 | Ivo Balabanov (BUL) | 5:45.87 | | FA |
| 9 | 11 | Daniel Do Nascimento (BRA) | 5:46.92 | PB | FB |
| 10 | 13 | Hossny Eisa (SUD) | 5:49.41 | PB | FB |
| 11 | 10 | Tsepo Ramashamole (LES) | 5:54.43 | PB | FB |
| 12 | 2 | Zeng Ting-Wei (TPE) | 5:58.21 | PB | FB |
| 13 | 4 | Diego Patricio Arévalo (ECU) | 6:07.43 | | FB |
| 14 | 14 | Hussein Sabbah (EGY) | 6:12.71 | SB | FB |
| 15 | 3 | Bader Alamrani (KSA) | 6:20.66 | | FB |

=== Finals ===
==== Final A ====
| Rank | Final Placing | Lane | Athlete | Result | Notes |
|---|---|---|---|---|---|
| 1st place, gold medalist(s) | 1 | 1 | Wegene Sidamo (ETH) | 5:38.42 | |
| 2nd place, silver medalist(s) | 2 | 3 | Amos Kirui (KEN) | 5:40.29 | |
| 3rd place, bronze medalist(s) | 3 | 5 | Hicham Chemlal (MAR) | 5:40.94 | |
| 4 | 4 | 2 | Amedee Manirakiza (BDI) | 5:47.52 | |
| 5 | 5 | 4 | Anthony Pontier (FRA) | 5:48.69 | |
| 6 | 6 | 8 | Ahmed Saidia (ALG) | 5:49.22 | |
| 7 | 7 | 6 | Ivo Balabanov (BUL) | 5:49.64 | |
| 8 | 8 | 7 | Soufien Cherni (TUN) | 5:51.41 | |

==== Final B ====
| Rank | Final Placing | Lane | Athlete | Result | Notes |
|---|---|---|---|---|---|
| 1 | 9 | 6 | Hossny Eisa (SUD) | 5:59.65 | |
| 2 | 10 | 3 | Daniel Do Nascimento (BRA) | 6:01.84 | |
| 3 | 11 | 2 | Tsepo Ramashamole (LES) | 6:02.83 | |
| 4 | 12 | 7 | Zeng Ting-Wei (TPE) | 6:10.36 | |
| 5 | 13 | 1 | Diego Patricio Arévalo (ECU) | 6:11.75 | |
| 6 | 14 | 5 | Hussein Sabbah (EGY) | 6:14.93 | |
| 7 | 15 | 4 | Bader Alamrani (KSA) | 6:18.52 | |
