= Athletics at the 2014 Summer Youth Olympics – Boys' 100 metres =

Athletics – Boys' 100 metres at the II Summer Youth Olympic Games
- Venue: Nanjing Olympic Sports Centre
- Date: August 21–23
- Competitors: 33 from 33 nations

Medalists
1st place, gold medalist(s)		Sydney Siame	Zambia
2nd place, silver medalist(s)		Kenta Oshima	Japan
3rd place, bronze medalist(s)		Trae Williams	Australia

The boys’ 100 m competition at the 2014 Summer Youth Olympics was held on 21–23 August 2014 in Nanjing Olympic Sports Center.

== Schedule ==
Date	Time	Round
21 August 2014	20:45	Heats
23 August 2014	21:20	Final

== Results ==
=== Heats ===
Eight fastest athletes advanced to Final A, the others advanced to Final B, C, or D according to their times.

Rank	Heat	Lane	Athlete	Result	Notes	Q
1	4	6	Trae Williams (AUS)	10.51	PB	FA
2	4	8	Sydney Siame (ZAM)	10.58		FA
3	1	4	Kenta Oshima (JPN)	10.62		FA
4	2	5	Raheem Chambers (JAM)	10.68		FA
5	3	2	Aitor Same Ekobo (ESP)	10.73		FA
6	4	9	Tyler Bowe (BAH)	10.78		FA
7	2	1	Meshaal Almutairi (KUW)	10.82		FA
7	3	6	Kristoffer Hari (DEN)	10.82		FA
7	1	7	Josneyber Ramírez (VEN)	10.82		FA
10	3	7	Cheng Po-yu (TPE)	10.84		FB
11	2	9	Alieu Joof (GAM)	11.00		FB
12	2	2	Arturo Deliser (PAN)	11.03		FB
13	2	7	Daniel Londero (ARG)	11.04		FB
14	1	5	Sergio Becerra (COL)	11.09		FB
15	1	2	Keasi Naidroka (FIJ)	11.23		FB
16	4	3	Dius Clauzema (LCA)	11.24		FB
16	2	8	Lekhotso Letlala (LES)	11.24		FB
16	1	9	Sekou Traore (MLI)	11.24		FB
19	1	8	Jeffrey Uzzell (USA)	11.27		FC
20	4	2	Mohamed Saad Ghali (BRN)	11.29		FC
21	1	6	Gwynn Uehara (PLW)	11.51	PB	FC
22	4	7	Moussa Abdoulaye (BEN)	11.52		FC
23	3	3	Cheick Camara (GUI)	11.60		FC
24	3	9	Nanthavat Khentanone (LAO)	11.67	PB	FC
25	3	5	Ronald Rakaku (RSA)	11.72		FC
26	4	4	Jean Daniel Lozereau (MRI)	11.76		FC
27	4	5	Kimwaua Makin (KIR)	11.77	PB	FD
28	2	4	Venancio Caculama (ANG)	12.00	PB	FD
29	3	8	Christian Charles (HAI)	12.01		FD
30	2	6	Faresa Kapisi (ASA)	12.03		FD
31	3	4	Reginald Koc (ARU)	12.10		FD
32	1	3	Cheikh Beya (MTN)	14.29		FD
33	2	3	Hussain Fahumee (MDV)	26.89		FD

=== Finals ===
==== Final A ====
Rank	Final Placing	Lane	Athlete	Result	Notes
1st place, gold medalist(s)	1	7	Sydney Siame (ZAM)	10.56	
2nd place, silver medalist(s)	2	4	Kenta Oshima (JPN)	10.57	
3rd place, bronze medalist(s)	3	6	Trae Williams (AUS)	10.60	
4	4	9	Aitor Same Ekobo (ESP)	10.71	=SB
5	5	1	Meshaal Almutairi (KUW)	10.80	
5	5	2	Kristoffer Hari (DEN)	10.80	
7	7	3	Josneyber Ramírez (VEN)	10.82	
8	8	8	Tyler Bowe (BAH)	10.96	
		3	Raheem Chambers (JAM)	DNS	

==== Final B ====
Rank	Final Placing	Lane	Athlete	Result	Notes
1	9	4	Cheng Po-yu (TPE)	10.83	
2	10	7	Arturo Deliser (PAN)	10.91	=SB
3	11	5	Alieu Joof (GAM)	10.96	
4	12	6	Daniel Londero (ARG)	11.02	
5	13	8	Sergio Becerra (COL)	11.11	
6	14	1	Dius Clauzema (LCA)	11.19	PB
7	15	2	Sekou Traore (MLI)	11.20	
8	16	3	Lekhotso Letlala (LES)	11.22	
9	17	9	Keasi Naidroka (FIJ)	11.44	

==== Final C ====
Rank	Final Placing	Lane	Athlete	Result	Notes
1	18	5	Jeffrey Uzzell (USA)	11.04	
2	19	4	Mohamed Saad Ghali (BRN)	11.27	
3	20	6	Moussa Abdoulaye (BEN)	11.43	PB
4	21	8	Cheick Camara (GUI)	11.48	
5	22	9	Nanthavat Khentanone (LAO)	11.79	
		7	Gwynn Uehara (PLW)	DNS	
		2	Jean Daniel Lozereau (MRI)	DNS	
		3	Ronald Rakaku (RSA)	DNS	

==== Final D ====
Rank	Final Placing	Lane	Athlete	Result	Notes
1	23	5	Venancio Caculama (ANG)	12.00	
		6	Christian Charles (HAI)	DNS	
		7	Reginald Koc (ARU)	DNS	
		8	Cheikh Beya (MTN)	DNS	
		2	Hussain Fahumee (MDV)	DNS	
		3	Kimwaua Makin (KIR)	DNS	
		4	Faresa Kapisi (ASA)	DNS	
