= Athletics at the 2014 Summer Youth Olympics – Girls' 3000 metres =

Athletics – Girls' 3000 metres at the II Summer Youth Olympic Games
- Venue: Nanjing Olympic Sports Centre
- Date: August 20–24
- Competitors: 20 from 20 nations

Medalists
1st place, gold medalist(s)		Nozomi Musembi Takamatsu	Japan
2nd place, silver medalist(s)		Alina Reh	Germany
3rd place, bronze medalist(s)		Berhan Demiesa Asgedom	Ethiopia

The girls’ 3000 m competition at the 2014 Summer Youth Olympics was held on 20–24 August 2014 in Nanjing Olympic Sports Center.

== Schedule ==
Date	Time	Round
20 August 2014	18:35	Heat
24 August 2014	20:05	Final

== Results ==
=== Heat ===
First 50% of the athletes from the Qualification round progress to the A Final and the remaining athletes to the B Final.

Rank	Lane	Athlete	Result	Notes	Q
1	2	Fatuma Chebsi (BRN)	9:06.87	PB	FA
2	1	Berhan Demiesa Asgedom (ETH)	9:07.05	PB	FA
3	20	Cavaline Nahimana (BDI)	9:07.23	PB	FA
4	5	Nozomi Musembi Takamatsu (JPN)	9:08.01		FA
5	14	Jackline Chepkoech (KEN)	9:08.54	PB	FA
6	13	Alina Reh (GER)	9:08.70		FA
7	15	Janat Chemusto (UGA)	9:10.74	PB	FA
8	3	Behafeta Hadiyes (AZE)	9:14.06	PB	FA
9	17	Maria Ifteni (ROU)	9:15.00	PB	FA
10	8	Simret Weldeghabr (ERI)	9:34.73	PB	FA
11	11	Enlitha Ncube (ZIM)	9:44.24	SB	FB
12	18	Soukaina Belil (MAR)	9:45.70		FB
13	12	Tsepang Sello (LES)	10:08.03	PB	FB
14	7	Noura Kherroubi (ALG)	10:08.86		FB
15	4	Mekhrangez Nazarova (TJK)	10:11.06	PB	FB
16	9	Judith Huaman (PER)	10:26.57		FB
17	16	Nalicy Chirwa (MAW)	10:34.27	PB	FB
18	19	Carine Wiysenyuy Tatah (CMR)	10:34.86		FB
19	10	Inesse Kazadi Tshinguta (COD)	10:53.66	PB	FB
20	6	Sangita Khadka (NEP)	11:16.29		FB

=== Finals ===
==== Final A ====
Rank	Final Placing	Lane	Athlete	Result	Notes
1st place, gold medalist(s)	1	9	Nozomi Musembi Takamatsu (JPN)	9:01.58	PB
2nd place, silver medalist(s)	2	7	Alina Reh (GER)	9:05.07	
3rd place, bronze medalist(s)	3	1	Berhan Demiesa Asgedom (ETH)	9:06.10	PB
4	4	6	Fatuma Chebsi (BRN)	9:12.66	
5	5	10	Cavaline Nahimana (BDI)	9:14.45	
6	6	8	Jackline Chepkoech (KEN)	9:20.43	
7	7	2	Janat Chemusto (UGA)	9:22.42	
8	8	5	Behafeta Hadiyes (AZE)	9:22.60	
9	9	4	Maria Ifteni (ROU)	9:29.53	
10	10	3	Simret Weldeghabr (ERI)	9:30.65	PB

==== Final B ====
Rank	Final Placing	Lane	Athlete	Result	Notes
1	11	1	Soukaina Belil (MAR)	9:44.90	
2	12	6	Enlitha Ncube (ZIM)	9:51.06	
3	13	9	Tsepang Sello (LES)	9:59.47	PB
4	14	2	Mekhrangez Nazarova (TJK)	9:59.84	PB
5	15	3	Noura Kherroubi (ALG)	10:11.15	
6	16	7	Judith Huaman (PER)	10:25.57	
7	17	10	Nalicy Chirwa (MAW)	10:35.98	
8	18	5	Inesse Kazadi Tshinguta (COD)	10:52.09	PB
9	19	8	Sangita Khadka (NEP)	10:52.15	PB
		4	Carine Wiysenyuy Tatah (CMR)	DNS	
