= Athletics at the 2014 Summer Youth Olympics – Boys' triple jump =

Athletics – Boys' triple jump at the II Summer Youth Olympic Games
- Venue: Nanjing Olympic Sports Centre
- Date: August 22–25
- Competitors: 17 from 17 nations

Medalists
1st place, gold medalist(s)		Miguel van Assen	Suriname
2nd place, silver medalist(s)		Tobia Bocchi	Italy
3rd place, bronze medalist(s)		Nazim Babayev	Azerbaijan

The boys’ triple jump competition at the 2014 Summer Youth Olympics was held on 22–25 August 2014 in Nanjing Olympic Sports Center.

== Schedule ==
Date	Time	Round
22 August 2014	18:30	Qualification
25 August 2014	19:35	Final

== Results ==
=== Qualification ===
First 50% of the athletes from the Qualification round progress to the A Final and the remaining athletes to the B Final.

Rank	Athlete	1	2	3	4	Result	Notes	Q
1	Miguel van Assen (SUR)	16.29	-	-	x	16.29		FA
2	Nazim Babayev (AZE)	15.65	x	x	-	15.65		FA
3	Tobia Bocchi (ITA)	13.84	15.37	-	-	15.37		FA
4	Jordon Scott (JAM)	15.19	15.07	15.36	15.05	15.36	PB	FA
5	Gal Sinai (ISR)	x	14.79	15.06	15.35	15.35	PB	FA
6	Oleksandr Malosilov (UKR)	14.77	15.28	15.31	14.87	15.31		FA
7	Ivan Solovyev (KAZ)	13.84	15.31	x	13.70	15.31	PB	FA
8	Precious Attipoe (GHA)	15.08	14.79	14.95	14.83	15.08		FA
9	Goga Maglakelidze (GEO)	15.01	14.78	14.74	15.07	15.07	PB	FA
10	Alejandro Kedar (ESP)	14.87	14.98	14.49	14.75	14.98		FB
11	Philipp Kronsteiner (AUT)	14.65	x	14.64	14.89	14.89		FB
12	Chakkrit Panthasa (THA)	14.42	13.79	14.34	14.68	14.68		FB
13	Akeem Bradshaw (IVB)	14.33	x	14.07	14.22	14.33		FB
14	Mohamed Sory Quattara (BUR)	14.08	13.62	13.54	14.12	14.12	PB	FB
15	Edison Luna (VEN)	x	13.90	13.47	13.97	13.97		FB
16	Suad Bashku (ALB)	x	13.54	x	13.69	13.69	PB	FB
17	Lansana Marico (SEN)	x	x	13.41	13.48	13.48		FB

=== Finals ===
==== Final A ====
Rank	Final Placing	Athlete	1	2	3	4	Result	Notes
1st place, gold medalist(s)	1	Miguel van Assen (SUR)	16.15	16.09	x	15.76	16.15	
2nd place, silver medalist(s)	2	Tobia Bocchi (ITA)	15.50	16.01	x	x	16.01	
3rd place, bronze medalist(s)	3	Nazim Babayev (AZE)	15.96	x	15.80	15.78	15.96	
4	4	Oleksandr Malosilov (UKR)	14.65	15.41	15.25	15.22	15.41	
5	5	Jordon Scott (JAM)	14.65	15.13	13.56	15.20	15.20	
6	6	Ivan Solovyev (KAZ)	14.71	14.76	14.96	13.62	14.96	
7	7	Goga Maglakelidze (GEO)	x	14.82	x	14.68	14.82	
8	8	Precious Attipoe (GHA)	14.64	14.32	14.16	-	14.64	
		Gal Sinai (ISR)	x	-	x	x	NM	

==== Final B ====
Rank	Final Placing	Athlete	1	2	3	4	Result	Notes
1	9	Philipp Kronsteiner (AUT)	14.66	x	14.62	15.18	15.18	PB
2	10	Alejandro Kedar (ESP)	14.63	14.89	14.96	14.88	14.96	
3	11	Chakkrit Panthasa (THA)	x	14.75	14.86	14.61	14.86	
4	12	Lansana Marico (SEN)	x	13.96	x	r	13.96	PB
5	13	Akeem Bradshaw (IVB)	13.90	x	x	13.60	13.90	
6	14	Mohamed Sory Quattara (BUR)	13.72	x	x	13.48	13.72	
		Suad Bashku (ALB)					DNS	
		Edison Luna (VEN)					DNS	
