= Weightlifting at the 2014 Summer Youth Olympics – Boys' 56 kg =

Boys' 56 at the II Summer Youth Olympic Games
- Venue: Nanjing International Expo Center
- Dates: August 17, 2014
- Competitors: 12 from 12 nations
- Winning total weight: 283kg

Medalists
1st place, gold medalist(s)		Meng Cheng	China
2nd place, silver medalist(s)		Nguyễn Trần Anh Tuấn	Vietnam
3rd place, bronze medalist(s)		Adkhamjon Ergashev	Uzbekistan

The boys' 56 kg weightlifting event was the first men's event at the weightlifting competition at the 2014 Summer Youth Olympics, with competitors limited to a maximum of 56 kilograms of body mass.

Each lifter performed in both the snatch and clean and jerk lifts, with the final score being the sum of the lifter's best result in each. The athlete received three attempts in each of the two lifts; the score for the lift was the heaviest weight successfully lifted.

== Results ==
Rank	Name	Body Weight	Snatch (kg)				Clean & Jerk (kg)				Total (kg)
Rank	Name	Body Weight	1	2	3	Res	1	2	3	Res	Total (kg)
1st place, gold medalist(s)	Meng Cheng (CHN)	55.81	120	~~128~~	128	128	140	155	~~160~~	155	283
2nd place, silver medalist(s)	Nguyễn Trần Anh Tuấn (VIE)	55.54	~~108~~	108	~~111~~	108	135	~~141~~	~~141~~	135	243
3rd place, bronze medalist(s)	Adkhamjon Ergashev (UZB)	55.92	105	~~110~~	110	110	128	133	~~136~~	133	243
4	Robert Ştefan Manea (ROU)	55.73	103	~~107~~	107	107	131	~~136~~	~~136~~	131	238
5	Faouzi Kraydi (TUN)	55.33	104	108	~~110~~	108	127	~~131~~	~~131~~	127	235
6	Lai Yung-en (TPE)	55.77	98	~~102~~	~~102~~	98	118	125	127	127	225
7	Victor Garrido Buenaire (ECU)	55.78	~~97~~	97	102	102	117	121	123	123	225
8	Karrar Al-Badri (IRQ)	55.24	88	93	~~97~~	93	117	121	~~125~~	121	214
9	Orlando Vasquez Morales (NCA)	55.22	~~82~~	82	87	87	~~102~~	102	~~110~~	102	189
10	Ruben Katoatau (KIR)	55.78	60	68	73	73	95	100	103	103	176
11	Rayvon Dekarube (NRU)	55.23	55	60	65	65	75	80	85	85	150
	Lalchhanhima (IND)	55.93	~~103~~	~~103~~	~~103~~	–	–	–	–	–	–
