= Guinea at the 2014 Summer Youth Olympics =

- IOC code: GUI
- NOC: Comité National Olympique et Sportif Guinéen

in Nanjing
- Competitors: 4 in 3 sports
- Medals: Gold 0 Silver 0 Bronze 0 Total 0

Summer Youth Olympics appearances
- 2010; 2014; 2018; 2026

Guinea competed at the 2014 Summer Youth Olympics, in Nanjing, China from 16 August to 28 August 2014.

== Athletics ==
Guinea qualified two athletes.

Qualification Legend: Q=Final A (medal); qB=Final B (non-medal); qC=Final C (non-medal); qD=Final D (non-medal); qE=Final E (non-medal)

Boys
Track & road events

Athlete	Event	Heats		Final	
Athlete	Event	Result	Rank	Result	Rank
Cheick Camara	100 m	11.60	23 qC	11.48	21

Girls
Track & road events

Athlete	Event	Heats		Final	
Athlete	Event	Result	Rank	Result	Rank
Fatoumata Bangoura	200 m	26.61	17 qC	26.67	17

== Judo ==
Guinea was given a quota to compete by the tripartite committee. However the athlete was barred from competing by the International Olympic Committee due to the Ebola outbreak in Guinea and the potential risk to other athletes.

Individual

Athlete	Event	Round of 32	Round of 16	Quarterfinals	Semifinals	Rep 1	Rep 2	Rep 3	Rep 4	Final / BM	Rank
Athlete	Event	Opposition Result	Opposition Result	Opposition Result	Opposition Result	Opposition Result	Opposition Result	Opposition Result	Opposition Result	Opposition Result	Rank
Mamadama Bangoura	Girls' -63 kg	Barred from Competing									

Team

Athletes	Event	Round of 16	Quarterfinals	Semifinals	Final	Rank
Athletes	Event	Opposition Result	Opposition Result	Opposition Result	Opposition Result	Rank
	Mixed Team	Barred from Competing				

== Swimming ==
Guinea qualified one swimmer. However the athlete was barred from competing by the International Olympic Committee due to the Ebola outbreak in Guinea and the potential risk to other athletes.

Boys

Athlete	Event	Heat		Semifinal		Final	
Athlete	Event	Time	Rank	Time	Rank	Time	Rank
Alhoussene Sylla	50 m freestyle	Barred from Competing					
