= Athletics at the 2014 Summer Youth Olympics – Girls' 200 metres =

Athletics – Girls' 200 metres at the II Summer Youth Olympic Games
- Venue: Nanjing Olympic Sports Centre
- Date: August 22–24
- Competitors: 24 from 24 nations

Medalists
1st place, gold medalist(s)		Natalliah Whyte	Jamaica
2nd place, silver medalist(s)		Dzhois Koba	Ukraine
3rd place, bronze medalist(s)		Brandee Johnson	United States

The Girls’ 200 m competition at the 2014 Summer Youth Olympics was held on 22–24 August 2014 in Nanjing Olympic Sports Center.

== Schedule ==
Date	Time	Round
22 August 2014	20:35	Heats
24 August 2014	10:49	Final

== Results ==
=== Heats ===
Eight fastest athletes advanced to Final A, the others advanced to Final B, or C according to their times.

Rank	Heat	Lane	Athlete	Result	Notes	Q
1	3	6	Natalliah Whyte (JAM)	23.79		FA
2	2	6	Dzhois Koba (UKR)	23.88		FA
3	1	6	Maureen Nyatichi Thomas (KEN)	24.33		FA
4	1	2	Brandee Johnson (USA)	24.41		FA
5	2	7	Fanny Peltier (FRA)	24.47		FA
6	1	5	Daysiellen Dias (BRA)	24.70		FA
7	1	9	Melinda Ferenczi (HUN)	24.73		FA
8	3	7	Ina Huemer (AUT)	24.74		FA
9	3	3	Kelly Lady Barona (ECU)	24.75		FB
10	2	5	Roseanna Mcguckian (IRL)	24.77		FB
11	2	3	Ioana Gheorghe (ROU)	24.80		FB
12	3	5	Tomomi Kawamura (JPN)	25.10		FB
13	1	7	Tegan Wilson (CAN)	25.12		FB
14	1	4	Deophister Chongo (ZAM)	25.99	YC	FB
15	2	9	Zhanae Elaine Jex (BIZ)	26.25		FB
16	2	4	Fanta Mbaye (GAM)	26.31	PB	FB
17	3	4	Fatoumata Bangoura (GUI)	26.61		FC
18	3	9	Pearl Morgan (CAY)	26.98		FC
19	1	3	Eneda Deliu (ALB)	27.31		FC
20	2	8	Isabel Mate (MOZ)	27.62		FC
21	2	2	Leandry-Celeste Digombou (GAB)	29.74		FC
22	3	8	Maryan Muse (SOM)	30.35	PB	FC
23	1	8	Sangay Wangmo (BHU)	30.87		FC
	3	2	Alessia Pavese (ITA)	DNS		

=== Finals ===
==== Final A ====
Rank	Final Placing	Lane	Athlete	Result	Notes
1st place, gold medalist(s)	1	4	Natalliah Whyte (JAM)	23.55	
2nd place, silver medalist(s)	2	6	Dzhois Koba (UKR)	23.94	
3rd place, bronze medalist(s)	3	5	Brandee Johnson (USA)	24.28	
4	4	7	Maureen Nyatichi Thomas (KEN)	24.43	
5	5	8	Fanny Peltier (FRA)	24.46	
6	6	9	Daysiellen Dias (BRA)	24.73	
7	7	3	Ina Huemer (AUT)	24.74	
8	8	2	Melinda Ferenczi (HUN)	24.79	

==== Final B ====
Rank	Final Placing	Lane	Athlete	Result	Notes
1	9	6	Kelly Lady Barona (ECU)	24.74	
2	10	7	Ioana Gheorghe (ROU)	24.81	
3	11	4	Roseanna Mcguckian (IRL)	25.15	
4	12	9	Tegan Wilson (CAN)	25.18	
5	13	5	Tomomi Kawamura (JPN)	25.18	
6	14	8	Deophister Chongo (ZAM)	25.59	PB
7	15	3	Zhanae Elaine Jex (BIZ)	26.40	
8	16	2	Fanta Mbaye (GAM)	26.65	

==== Final C ====
Rank	Final Placing	Lane	Athlete	Result	Notes
1	17	3	Fatoumata Bangoura (GUI)	26.67	
2	18	6	Pearl Morgan (CAY)	27.32	
3	19	5	Isabel Mate (MOZ)	27.52	
4	20	8	Leandry-Celeste Digombou (GAB)	29.94	
5	21	2	Sangay Wangmo (BHU)	30.91	
		4	Eneda Deliu (ALB)	DNS	
		7	Maryan Muse (SOM)	DNS	
