= Kiribati at the 2014 Summer Youth Olympics =

- IOC code: KIR
- NOC: Kiribati National Olympic Committee

in Nanjing
- Competitors: 3 in 2 sports
- Medals: Gold 0 Silver 0 Bronze 0 Total 0

Summer Youth Olympics appearances
- 2010; 2014; 2018

Kiribati competed at the 2014 Summer Youth Olympics, in Nanjing, China from 16 August to 28 August 2014.

== Athletics ==
Kiribati qualified two athletes.

Qualification Legend: Q=Final A (medal); qB=Final B (non-medal); qC=Final C (non-medal); qD=Final D (non-medal); qE=Final E (non-medal)

Boys
Track & road events

Athlete	Event	Heats		Final	
Athlete	Event	Result	Rank	Result	Rank
Kimwaua Makin	100 m	11.77	27 qD	DNS	

Girls
Track & road events

Athlete	Event	Heats		Final	
Athlete	Event	Result	Rank	Result	Rank
Margaret Beetaa	100 m	15.04	30 qD	DNS	

== Weightlifting ==
Kiribati was given a quota to compete in a boys' event by the tripartite committee.

Boys

Athlete	Event	Snatch		Clean & jerk		Total	Rank
Athlete	Event	Result	Rank	Result	Rank	Total	Rank
Ruben Katoatau	−56 kg	73	10	103	9	176	10
