= Angola at the 2014 Summer Youth Olympics =

- IOC code: ANG
- NOC: Comité Olímpico Angolano

in Nanjing
- Competitors: 15 in 2 sports

Summer Youth Olympics appearances
- 2010; 2014; 2018

Angola competed at the 2014 Summer Youth Olympics, in Nanjing, China from 16 August to 28 August 2014.

== Athletics ==
Angola qualified one athlete.

Qualification Legend: Q=Final A (medal); qB=Final B (non-medal); qC=Final C (non-medal); qD=Final D (non-medal); qE=Final E (non-medal)

Boys
Track & road events

Athlete	Event	Heats		Final	
Athlete	Event	Result	Rank	Result	Rank
Venancio Caculama	100 m	12.00	28 qD	12.00	23

== Handball ==
Angola qualified a girls' team based on its performance at the 2013 African Women's Youth Handball Championship.

=== Girls' tournament ===
Roster

- Amelia Caluyombo
- Alexandra Chaca
- Alcina Chitangueleca
- Joana Costa
- Nicol da Costa
- Fernanda Cungulo
- Lucinda Ganga
- Vilma Menganga
- Manuela Paulino
- Dalva Peres
- Marila Quizelete
- Vilma Silva
- Swelly Simao
- Jocelina Yanda

Group stage

Pos	Team	Pld	W	D	L	GF	GA	GD	Pts	Qualification
1	Russia	2	2	0	0	70	52	+18	4	Semifinals
2	South Korea	2	1	0	1	70	59	+11	2	Semifinals
3	Angola	2	0	0	2	44	73	−29	0	5th place game

Source: Nanjing 2014
Rules for classification: 1) points; 2) head-to-head points; 3) head-to-head goal difference; 4) head-to-head number of goals scored; 5) goal difference.

20 August; 14:00	Angola	21 – 34	Russia	Jiangning Sports Centre Gymnasium, Nanjing; Referees: Natasha Engberg, Alexandra Laurell (SWE)
20 August; 14:00	Paulino 8	(12 – 20)	3 players 4	Jiangning Sports Centre Gymnasium, Nanjing; Referees: Natasha Engberg, Alexandra Laurell (SWE)
20 August; 14:00	1× (yellow card) 1× (suspension)	Report	3× (yellow card) 3× (suspension)	Jiangning Sports Centre Gymnasium, Nanjing; Referees: Natasha Engberg, Alexandra Laurell (SWE)

21 August; 14:00	South Korea	39 – 23	Angola	Jiangning Sports Centre Gymnasium, Nanjing; Referees: Tomoko Ota, Mariko Shimajiri (JPN)
21 August; 14:00	Kang D-h 7	(20 – 11)	da Costa 6	Jiangning Sports Centre Gymnasium, Nanjing; Referees: Tomoko Ota, Mariko Shimajiri (JPN)
21 August; 14:00	2× (yellow card) 3× (suspension)	Report	3× (yellow card) 4× (suspension)	Jiangning Sports Centre Gymnasium, Nanjing; Referees: Tomoko Ota, Mariko Shimajiri (JPN)

5th Place Playoff

24 August; 9:00	Angola	31 – 18	China	Jiangning Sports Centre Gymnasium, Nanjing; Referees: Tomoko Ota, Mariko Shimajiri (JPN)
24 August; 9:00	Paulino 8	(14 – 6)	Shi 5	Jiangning Sports Centre Gymnasium, Nanjing; Referees: Tomoko Ota, Mariko Shimajiri (JPN)
24 August; 9:00		Report	2× (yellow card) 4× (suspension)	Jiangning Sports Centre Gymnasium, Nanjing; Referees: Tomoko Ota, Mariko Shimajiri (JPN)

25 August; 9:00	China	22 – 22	Angola	Jiangning Sports Centre Gymnasium, Nanjing; Referees: Wang Ke, Li Gang (CHN)
25 August; 9:00	Lin 7	(9 – 11)	Paulino 9	Jiangning Sports Centre Gymnasium, Nanjing; Referees: Wang Ke, Li Gang (CHN)
25 August; 9:00	3× (yellow card) 1× (suspension)	Report	3× (yellow card) 1× (suspension)	Jiangning Sports Centre Gymnasium, Nanjing; Referees: Wang Ke, Li Gang (CHN)
