= Saint Lucia at the 2014 Summer Youth Olympics =

- IOC code: LCA
- NOC: St. Lucia Olympic Committee

in Nanjing
- Competitors: 6 in 4 sports
- Medals: Gold 0 Silver 0 Bronze 0 Total 0

Summer Youth Olympics appearances
- 2010; 2014; 2018; 2026

Saint Lucia competed at the 2014 Summer Youth Olympics, in Nanjing, China from 16 August to 28 August 2014.

== Athletics ==
Saint Lucia qualified two athletes.

Qualification Legend: Q=Final A (medal); qB=Final B (non-medal); qC=Final C (non-medal); qD=Final D (non-medal); qE=Final E (non-medal)

Boys
Track & road events

Athlete	Event	Heats		Final	
Athlete	Event	Result	Rank	Result	Rank
Dius Clauzelma	100 m	11.24	16 qB	11.19	14

Girls
Field events

Athlete	Event	Qualification		Final	
Athlete	Event	Distance	Rank	Distance	Rank
Rochelle Etienne	Javelin throw	34.40	18 qB	37.41	17

== Beach Volleyball ==
St. Lucia qualified a girls' team by winning the NORCECA ECVA Zone Qualifier.

Athletes	Event	Preliminary round	Standing	Round of 24	Round of 16	Quarterfinals	Semifinals	Final / BM	Rank
Athletes	Event	Opposition Score	Standing	Opposition Score	Opposition Score	Opposition Score	Opposition Score	Opposition Score	Rank
Skye Faucher Mondesir; Dala Noel	Girls'	Sakalia/Eti (TUV); W 2 – 0	4 Q	Gerson/Rohrer (SUI); L 0 – 2	did not advance				17
Skye Faucher Mondesir; Dala Noel	Girls'	Bitrus/Audu (NGR); W w/o	4 Q	Gerson/Rohrer (SUI); L 0 – 2	did not advance				17
Skye Faucher Mondesir; Dala Noel	Girls'	Fortunati/Rotti (URU); L 0 – 2	4 Q	Gerson/Rohrer (SUI); L 0 – 2	did not advance				17
Skye Faucher Mondesir; Dala Noel	Girls'	Cetin/Yurtsever (TUR); L 0 – 2	4 Q	Gerson/Rohrer (SUI); L 0 – 2	did not advance				17
Skye Faucher Mondesir; Dala Noel	Girls'	Song/Pan (TPE); L 1 – 2	4 Q	Gerson/Rohrer (SUI); L 0 – 2	did not advance				17

== Sailing ==
St. Lucia was given a boat to compete by the tripartite committee.

Athlete	Event	Race											Net Points	Final Rank
Athlete	Event	1	2	3	4	5	6	7	8	9	10	M*	Net Points	Final Rank
Luc Chevrier	Boys' Byte CII	13	17	12	14	14	16	~~25~~	CAN			24	110	20

== Swimming ==
Saint Lucia qualified one swimmer.

Girls

Athlete	Event	Heat		Semifinal		Final	
Athlete	Event	Time	Rank	Time	Rank	Time	Rank
Thalia Bergasse	100 m freestyle	1:04.34	34	did not advance			
Thalia Bergasse	200 m backstroke	2:35.62	28	—N/a		did not advance	
