= Myanmar at the 2014 Summer Youth Olympics =

- IOC code: MYA
- NOC: Myanmar Olympic Committee

in Nanjing
- Competitors: 4 in 4 sports
- Medals: Gold 0 Silver 0 Bronze 0 Total 0

Summer Youth Olympics appearances
- 2010; 2014; 2018; 2026

Myanmar competed at the 2014 Summer Youth Olympics, in Nanjing, China from 16 August to 28 August 2014.

== Archery ==
Myanmar was given a quota to compete by the tripartite committee.

Individual

Athlete	Event	Ranking round		Round of 32	Round of 16	Quarterfinals	Semifinals	Final / BM	Rank
Athlete	Event	Score	Seed	Opposition Score	Opposition Score	Opposition Score	Opposition Score	Opposition Score	Rank
Min Kyaw	Boys' Individual	595	31	A Verma (IND); L 0 – 6	did not advance				17

Team

Athletes	Event	Ranking round		Round of 32	Round of 16	Quarterfinals	Semifinals	Final / BM	Rank
Athletes	Event	Score	Seed	Opposition Score	Opposition Score	Opposition Score	Opposition Score	Opposition Score	Rank
Diananda Choirunisa (INA); Min Kyaw (MYA)	Mixed Team	1268	28	J Sutton (AUS); E Fregnan (ITA); L 3 – 5	did not advance				17

== Athletics ==
Myanmar qualified one athlete.

Qualification Legend: Q=Final A (medal); qB=Final B (non-medal); qC=Final C (non-medal); qD=Final D (non-medal); qE=Final E (non-medal)

Girls
Track & road events

Athlete	Event	Heats		Final	
Athlete	Event	Result	Rank	Result	Rank
Hnin Yu Soe	2000 m steeplechase	7:19.47	14 qB	7:19.47	16

== Sailing ==
Myanmar qualified one boat based on its performance at the Techno 293 Asian Continental Qualifiers.

Athlete	Event	Race											Net Points	Final Rank
Athlete	Event	1	2	3	4	5	6	7	8	9	10	M*	Net Points	Final Rank
Set Naing Aung	Boys' Techno 293	7	~~19~~	16	5	16	14	CAN				15	73	13

== Weightlifting ==
Myanmar qualified 1 quota in the girls' events based on the team ranking after the 2013 Weightlifting Youth World Championships.

Girls

Athlete	Event	Snatch		Clean & jerk		Total	Rank
Athlete	Event	Result	Rank	Result	Rank	Total	Rank
Zin May Oo	−48 kg	63	6	85	4	148	6
