= Sudan at the 2014 Summer Youth Olympics =

- IOC code: SUD
- NOC: Sudan Olympic Committee

in Nanjing
- Competitors: 5 in 1 sport
- Medals: Gold 0 Silver 0 Bronze 0 Total 0

Summer Youth Olympics appearances
- 2010; 2014; 2018

Sudan competed at the 2014 Summer Youth Olympics, in Nanjing, China from 16 August to 28 August 2014.

== Athletics ==
Sudan qualified five athletes.

Qualification Legend: Q=Final A (medal); qB=Final B (non-medal); qC=Final C (non-medal); qD=Final D (non-medal); qE=Final E (non-medal)

Boys
Track & road events

Athlete	Event	Heats		Final	
Athlete	Event	Result	Rank	Result	Rank
Ibrahim Adam	800 m	1:56.44	15 qB	1:56.26	12
Adam Abdelwahab	1500 m	3:49.45 PB	5 Q	3:51.61	9
Adam Mohamed	3000 m	8:46.65 PB	15 qB	8:37.11	11
Hossny Eisa	2000 m steeplechase	5:49.41	10 qB	5:59.65	9

Girls
Track & road events

Athlete	Event	Heats		Final	
Athlete	Event	Result	Rank	Result	Rank
Safa Malik	400 m hurdles	1:03.02	15 qB	1:04.18	16
