= Somalia at the 2014 Summer Youth Olympics =

- IOC code: SOM
- NOC: Somali Olympic Committee

in Nanjing
- Competitors: 2 in 1 sport
- Medals: Gold 0 Silver 0 Bronze 0 Total 0

Summer Youth Olympics appearances
- 2010; 2014; 2018

Somalia competed at the 2014 Summer Youth Olympics, in Nanjing, China from 16 August to 28 August, 2014.

== Athletics ==
Somalia qualified two athletes.

Qualification Legend: Q=Final A (medal); qB=Final B (non-medal); qC=Final C (non-medal); qD=Final D (non-medal); qE=Final E (non-medal)

Boys
Track & road events

| Athlete | Event | Heats | | Final | |
| Athlete | Event | Result | Rank | Result | Rank |
|---|---|---|---|---|---|
| Ahmed Hassan | 800 m | DSQ qC | | DNS | |

Girls
Track & road events

| Athlete | Event | Heats | | Final | |
| Athlete | Event | Result | Rank | Result | Rank |
|---|---|---|---|---|---|
| Maryan Muse | 200 m | 30.35 | 22 qC | DNS | |
