= Aruba at the 2014 Summer Youth Olympics =

- IOC code: ARU
- NOC: Aruban Olympic Committee

in Nanjing
- Competitors: 4 in 3 sports
- Medals: Gold 0 Silver 0 Bronze 0 Total 0

Summer Youth Olympics appearances
- 2010; 2014; 2018

Aruba competed at the 2014 Summer Youth Olympics, in Nanjing, China from 16 August to 28 August 2014.

== Athletics ==
Aruba qualified one athlete.

Qualification Legend: Q=Final A (medal); qB=Final B (non-medal); qC=Final C (non-medal); qD=Final D (non-medal); qE=Final E (non-medal)

Boys
Track & road events

Athlete	Event	Heats		Final	
Athlete	Event	Result	Rank	Result	Rank
Reginald Koc	100 m	12.10	31 qD	DNS	

== Sailing ==
Aruba qualified a boat based on its performance at the North American & Caribbean Continental Qualifiers.

Athlete	Event	Race											Net Points	Final Rank
Athlete	Event	1	2	3	4	5	6	7	8	9	10	M*	Net Points	Final Rank
Mack van den Eerenbeemt	Boys' Techno 293	16	10	~~18~~	18	11	15	CAN				12	82	14

== Swimming ==
Aruba qualified two swimmers.

Boys

Athlete	Event	Heat		Semifinal		Final	
Athlete	Event	Time	Rank	Time	Rank	Time	Rank
Jordy Groters	50 m breaststroke	29.03	16 Q	28.90	11	did not advance	
Jordy Groters	100 m breaststroke	1:03.96	20	did not advance			

Girls

Athlete	Event	Heat		Final	
Athlete	Event	Time	Rank	Time	Rank
Daniella van den Berg	400 m freestyle	4:26.14	22	did not advance	
Daniella van den Berg	800 m freestyle	—N/a		8:59.38	15
