= Iraq at the 2014 Summer Youth Olympics =

- IOC code: IRQ
- NOC: National Olympic Committee of Iraq

in Nanjing
- Competitors: 5 in 4 sports
- Medals Ranked 80th: Gold 0 Silver 0 Bronze 1 Total 1

Summer Youth Olympics appearances (overview)
- 2010; 2014; 2018

Iraq competed at the 2014 Summer Youth Olympics, in Nanjing, China from 16 August to 28 August 2014.

== Medalists ==
Medal	Name	Sport	Event	Date
Bronze	Muntadher Abdulwahid	Athletics	Boys' Pole vault	25 August

== Athletics ==
Iraq qualified two athletes.

Qualification Legend: Q=Final A (medal); qB=Final B (non-medal); qC=Final C (non-medal); qD=Final D (non-medal); qE=Final E (non-medal)

Boys
Field Events

Athlete	Event	Qualification		Final	
Athlete	Event	Distance	Rank	Distance	Rank
Muntadher Abdulwahid	Pole vault	4.90	3 Q	5.05	3rd place, bronze medalist(s)
Hussein Al-Bayati	Hammer throw	67.73	12 qB	68.01	10

== Fencing ==
Iraq was given a quota to compete by the tripartite committee.

Boys

Athlete	Event	Pool Round	Seed	Round of 16	Quarterfinals	Semifinals	Final / BM	Rank
Athlete	Event	Opposition Score	Seed	Opposition Score	Opposition Score	Opposition Score	Opposition Score	Rank
Muradha Al-Musawi	Sabre	Y Yan (CHN); L 2 – 5 T Cucu (ROU); L 0 – 5 K Dongju (KOR); L 1 – 5 M Ayman (EGY); W 5 – 3 I Ilin (RUS); L 1 – 5 B Alshamlan (KUW); L 4 – 5	12	N Kassymov (KAZ); L 10 – 15	did not advance			13

== Gymnastics ==
=== Artistic Gymnastics ===
Iraq qualified one athlete based on its performance at the 2014 Asian Artistic Gymnastics Championships.

Girls

Athlete	Event	Apparatus				Total	Rank
Athlete	Event	F	V	UB	BB	Total	Rank
Fatimah Al-Tameemi	Qualification	10.000	12.350	7.400	10.200	39.950	38

== Weightlifting ==
Iraq was given a quota to compete in a boys' event by the tripartite committee.

Boys

Athlete	Event	Snatch		Clean & jerk		Total	Rank
Athlete	Event	Result	Rank	Result	Rank	Total	Rank
Karrar Al-Badri	−56 kg	93	8	121	8	214	8
