= Nicaragua at the 2014 Summer Youth Olympics =

- IOC code: NCA
- NOC: Comité Olímpico Nicaragüense

in Nanjing
- Competitors: 4 in 4 sports
- Medals: Gold 0 Silver 0 Bronze 0 Total 0

Summer Youth Olympics appearances
- 2010; 2014; 2018

Nicaragua competed at the 2014 Summer Youth Olympics, in Nanjing, China from 16 August to 28 August 2014.

== Athletics ==
Nicaragua qualified one athlete.

Qualification Legend: Q=Final A (medal); qB=Final B (non-medal); qC=Final C (non-medal); qD=Final D (non-medal); qE=Final E (non-medal)

Girls
Track & road events

Athlete	Event	Heats		Final	
Athlete	Event	Result	Rank	Result	Rank
Jahoska Espinales Delgado	800 m	DNF qC		DNS	

== Swimming ==
Nicaragua qualified one swimmer.

Girls

Athlete	Event	Heat		Semifinal		Final	
Athlete	Event	Time	Rank	Time	Rank	Time	Rank
Carmen Guerra	50 m breaststroke	35.37	29	did not advance			
Carmen Guerra	100 m breaststroke	1:18.09	27	did not advance			

== Weightlifting ==
Nicaragua was given a quota to compete in a boys' event by the tripartite committee.

Boys

Athlete	Event	Snatch		Clean & jerk		Total	Rank
Athlete	Event	Result	Rank	Result	Rank	Total	Rank
Orlando Vasquez Morales	−56 kg	87	9	102	10	189	9

== Wrestling ==
Nicaragua was given a spot to compete from the Tripartite Commission.

Key:
- VT - Victory by Fall.
- PP - Decision by Points - the loser with technical points.
- PO - Decision by Points - the loser without technical points.

Boys

Athlete	Event	Group stage				Final / RM	Rank
Athlete	Event	Opposition Score	Opposition Score	Opposition Score	Rank	Opposition Score	Rank
Miguel Gurdian Lopez	Freestyle -46kg	M Hegab (EGY); L 1 – 3	C Olivas (USA); L 1 – 4	C Duyum (TUR); L 1 – 3	4 Q	F Ipolito (ASA); W 4 – 0	7
