= Judo at the 2014 Summer Youth Olympics – Girls' 63 kg =

Judo competition

Girls' 63 kg at the II Summer Youth Olympic Games
- Venue: Longjiang Gymnasium
- Date: August 18
- Competitors: 16 from 16 nations

Medalists
| 1st place, gold medalist(s) | | Szabina Gercsák | Hungary |
| 2nd place, silver medalist(s) | | Stefania Adelina Dobre | Romania |
| 3rd place, bronze medalist(s) | | Jennifer Schwille | Germany |
| 3rd place, bronze medalist(s) | | Michaela Polleres | Austria |

The Girls' 63 kg tournament in Judo at the 2014 Summer Youth Olympics was held on August 18 at the Longjiang Gymnasium.

This event was the second heaviest of the girl's judo weight classes, limiting competitors to a maximum of 63 kilograms of body mass. The tournament bracket consisted of a single-elimination contest culminating in a gold medal match. There was also a repechage to determine the winners of the two bronze medals. Each judoka who had lost before the finals competed in the repechage with the two finalists getting bronze medals.

== Results ==
=== Main Bracket ===
Round of 16
Jennifer Schwille (GER) | 101
Adela Szarzecova (CZE) | 000
Ivana Sunjevic (MNE) | 000
Jessica Klimkait (CAN) | 002
Lubjana Piovesana (GBR) | 000
Stefania Adelina Dobre (ROU) | 000
Tea Tintor (SRB) | 000
Liudmyla Drozdova (UKR) | 110
Szabina Gercsák (HUN) | 100
Nokutula Banda (ZAM) | 000
Brigitte Carabalí (COL) | 001
Chiara Carminucci (ITA) | 000
Lisa Mullenberg (NED) | 100
Hassiatou Yahaya Aboubacar (NIG) | 000
Michaela Polleres (AUT) | 100
Fatim Fofana (CIV) | 000

Quarterfinals
Jennifer Schwille (GER) | 000
Jessica Klimkait (CAN) | 001
Stefania Adelina Dobre (ROU) | 100
Liudmyla Drozdova (UKR) | 000
Szabina Gercsák (HUN) | 100
Brigitte Carabalí (COL) | 000
Lisa Mullenberg (NED) | 100
Michaela Polleres (AUT) | 000

Semifinals
Jessica Klimkait (CAN) | 010
Stefania Adelina Dobre (ROU) | 100
Szabina Gercsák (HUN) | 100
Lisa Mullenberg (NED) | 000

Finals
Stefania Adelina Dobre (ROU) | 000
Szabina Gercsák (HUN) | 102

=== Repechage ===
Repechage 1
Adela Szarzecova (CZE) | 011
Ivana Sunjevic (MNE) | 101
Lubjana Piovesana (GBR) | 101
Tea Tintor (SRB) | 000
Nokutula Banda (ZAM) | 010
Chiara Carminucci (ITA) | 000
Hassiatou Yahaya Aboubacar (NIG) | 000
Fatim Fofana (CIV) | 110

Repechage 2
Ivana Sunjevic (MNE) | 101
Liudmyla Drozdova (UKR) | 000
Lubjana Piovesana (GBR) | 000
Jennifer Schwille (GER) | 100
Nokutula Banda (ZAM) | 000
Michaela Polleres (AUT) | 100
Fatim Fofana (CIV) | 000
Brigitte Carabalí (COL) | 010

Repechage 3
Ivana Sunjevic (MNE) | 000
Jennifer Schwille (GER) | 011
Michaela Polleres (AUT) | 011
Brigitte Carabalí (COL) | 000

Bronze Medal Finals
Jennifer Schwille (GER) | 101
Lisa Mullenberg (NED) | 000
Michaela Polleres (AUT) | 000
Jessica Klimkait (CAN) | 000
