= Panama at the 2014 Summer Youth Olympics =

- IOC code: PAN
- NOC: Comité Olímpico Nacional De Panamá

in Nanjing
- Competitors: 8 in 4 sports
- Medals: Gold 0 Silver 0 Bronze 0 Total 0

Summer Youth Olympics appearances
- 2010; 2014; 2018; 2026

Panama competed at the 2014 Summer Youth Olympics, in Nanjing, China from 16 August to 28 August 2014.

== Athletics ==
Panama qualified three athletes.

Qualification Legend: Q=Final A (medal); qB=Final B (non-medal); qC=Final C (non-medal); qD=Final D (non-medal); qE=Final E (non-medal)

Boys
Track & road events

Athlete	Event	Heats		Final	
Athlete	Event	Result	Rank	Result	Rank
Arturo Deliser	100 m	11.03	12 qB	10.91	10

Field Events

Athlete	Event	Qualification		Final	
Athlete	Event	Distance	Rank	Distance	Rank
Jaime Escobar	High jump	2.03 SB	10 qB	2.05 SB	9

Girls
Track & road events

Athlete	Event	Heats		Final	
Athlete	Event	Result	Rank	Result	Rank
Leyka Archibold	400 m hurdles	1:04.51	16 qB	1:04.13	15

== Golf ==
Panama was given one spot to compete from the Tripartite Commission.

Individual

Athlete	Event	Round 1		Round 2			Round 3			Total	
Athlete	Event	Score	Rank	Score	Total	Rank	Score	Total	Rank	Score	Rank
Marcos Cabarcos	Boys	+8	28	+2	+10	25	+2	+12	26	+12	26

Team

Athletes	Event	Round 1 (Foursome)		Round 2 (Fourball)			Round 3 (Individual Stroke)				Total	
Athletes	Event	Score	Rank	Score	Total	Rank	Boy	Girl	Total	Rank	Score	Rank
Marcos Cabarcos (PAN); Sofia Goicoechea Ruiz (ARG)	Mixed	+1	28	+5	+6	28	+2	+5	+13	28	+13	28

== Gymnastics ==
=== Artistic Gymnastics ===
Panama was given a quota to compete by the tripartite committee.

Boys

Athlete	Event	Apparatus						Total	Rank
Athlete	Event	F	PH	R	V	PB	HB	Total	Rank
Kevin Espinosa	Qualification	10.650	10.800	11.450	12.200	11.250	11.500	67.850	37

== Swimming ==
Panama qualified three swimmers.

Boys

Athlete	Event	Heat		Semifinal		Final	
Athlete	Event	Time	Rank	Time	Rank	Time	Rank
Manuel Gonzalez	50 m freestyle	23.86	23	did not advance			
Franco Reyes	50 m butterfly	25.17	20	did not advance			

Girls

Athlete	Event	Heat		Final	
Athlete	Event	Time	Rank	Time	Rank
Maria Fernanda Far	200 m butterfly	2:18.96	21	did not advance	
