= Belize at the 2014 Summer Youth Olympics =

- IOC code: BIZ
- NOC: Belize Olympic and Commonwealth Games Association
- Website: www.olympic.org/belize

in Nanjing
- Competitors: 3 in 2 sports

Summer Youth Olympics appearances
- 2010; 2014; 2018

Belize competed at the 2014 Summer Youth Olympics, in Nanjing, China from 16 August to 28 August 2014.

== Athletics ==
Belize qualified one athlete.

Qualification Legend: Q=Final A (medal); qB=Final B (non-medal); qC=Final C (non-medal); qD=Final D (non-medal); qE=Final E (non-medal)

Girls
Track & road events

Athlete	Event	Heats		Final	
Athlete	Event	Result	Rank	Result	Rank
Zhanae Jex	200 m	26.25	15 qB	26.40	15

== Cycling ==
Belize was given an invitation by the tripartite commission.

Team

Athletes	Event	Cross-Country Eliminator		Time Trial			BMX		Cross-Country Race			Road Race			Total Pts	Rank
Athletes	Event	Rank	Points	Time	Rank	Points	Rank	Points	Time	Rank	Points	Time	Rank	Points	Total Pts	Rank
Delawn Abraham; Zahir Figueroa	Boys' Team	31	0	6:06.91	31	0	DNS	0	-4 LAP	30	0	DNF; 1:46:27	50	0	0	32

Mixed Relay

Athletes	Event	Cross-Country Girls' Race	Cross-Country Boys' Race	Boys' Road Race	Girls' Road Race	Total Time	Rank
Nina Janusikova (SVK); Zahir Figueroa (BIZ); Delawn Abraham (BIZ); Tereza Medvenova (SVK)	Mixed Team Relay	3:52	3:30	6:10	6:15	19:47	21
