= Lesotho at the 2014 Summer Youth Olympics =

- IOC code: LES
- NOC: Lesotho National Olympic Committee

in Nanjing
- Competitors: 7 in 2 sports
- Medals: Gold 0 Silver 0 Bronze 0 Total 0

Summer Youth Olympics appearances
- 2010; 2014; 2018

Lesotho competed at the 2014 Summer Youth Olympics, in Nanjing, China from 16 August to 28 August 2014.

== Athletics ==
Lesotho qualified five athletes.

Qualification Legend: Q=Final A (medal); qB=Final B (non-medal); qC=Final C (non-medal); qD=Final D (non-medal); qE=Final E (non-medal)

Boys
Track & road events

Athlete	Event	Heats		Final	
Athlete	Event	Result	Rank	Result	Rank
Lekhotso Letlala	100 m	11.24	=16 qB	11.22	16
Tsepo Ramashamole	2000 m steeplechase	5:54.43 PB	11 qB	6:02.83	11

Girls
Track & road events

Athlete	Event	Heats		Final	
Athlete	Event	Result	Rank	Result	Rank
Mathapelo Molapo	100 m	13.44	22 qC	DSQ	
Tsepang Sello	3000 m	10:08.03 PB	13 qB	9:59.47	13
Thakane Mapoho	2000 m steeplechase	7:40.11 PB	17 qB	7:19.43	15

== Cycling ==
Lesotho qualified a boys' team based on its ranking issued by the UCI.

Team

Athletes	Event	Cross-Country Eliminator		Time Trial			BMX		Cross-Country Race			Road Race			Total Pts	Rank
Athletes	Event	Rank	Points	Time	Rank	Points	Rank	Points	Time	Rank	Points	Time	Rank	Points	Total Pts	Rank
Malefetsane Lesofe; Tumelo Makae	Boys' Team	21	0	6:05.32	30	0	DNS	0	-4 LAP	27	0	1:59:31; DNF	55	0	0	29

Mixed Relay

Athletes	Event	Cross-Country Girls' Race	Cross-Country Boys' Race	Boys' Road Race	Girls' Road Race	Total Time	Rank
Sun Jiajun (CHN); Tumelo Makae (LES); Malefetsane Lesofe (LES); TAN Jiale (CHN)	Mixed Team Relay	4:05	3:13	6:32	5:13	20:03	24
