= Namibia at the 2014 Summer Youth Olympics =

- IOC code: NAM
- NOC: Namibian National Olympic Committee

in Nanjing
- Competitors: 30 in 8 sports
- Medals: Gold 0 Silver 0 Bronze 0 Total 0

Summer Youth Olympics appearances
- 2010; 2014; 2018; 2026

Namibia competed at the 2014 Summer Youth Olympics, in Nanjing, China from 16 August to 28 August 2014.

== Archery ==
Namibia was given a quota to compete by the tripartite committee.

Individual

Athlete	Event	Ranking round		Round of 32	Round of 16	Quarterfinals	Semifinals	Final / BM	Rank
Athlete	Event	Score	Seed	Opposition Score	Opposition Score	Opposition Score	Opposition Score	Opposition Score	Rank
Xander Reddig	Boys' Individual	616	27	Koenig (FRA); L 0–6	did not advance				17

Team

Athletes	Event	Ranking round		Round of 32	Round of 16	Quarterfinals	Semifinals	Final / BM	Rank
Athletes	Event	Score	Seed	Opposition Score	Opposition Score	Opposition Score	Opposition Score	Opposition Score	Rank
Xander Reddig (NAM); Viktoriia Oleksiuk (UKR)	Mixed Team	1271	25	Villegas (VEN); Balaz (SVK); L 0–6	did not advance				17

== Athletics ==
Namibia qualified one athlete.

Qualification Legend: Q=Final A (medal); qB=Final B (non-medal); qC=Final C (non-medal); qD=Final D (non-medal); qE=Final E (non-medal)

Boys
Field Events

Athlete	Event	Qualification		Final	
Athlete	Event	Distance	Rank	Distance	Rank
Eugene Niemann	Javelin throw	55.40	15 qB	55.58	13

== Beach Volleyball ==
Namibia qualified a girls' team by their performance at the CAVB Qualification Tournament.

Athletes	Event	Preliminary round	Standing	Round of 24	Round of 16	Quarterfinals	Semifinals	Final / BM	Rank
Athletes	Event	Opposition Score	Standing	Opposition Score	Opposition Score	Opposition Score	Opposition Score	Opposition Score	Rank
Stephanie Palmhert; Kim Seebach	Girls'	Enzo – Lantignotti (ITA); L 0–2	6	did not advance					31
Stephanie Palmhert; Kim Seebach	Girls'	McNamara – McNamara (CAN); L 0–2	6	did not advance					31
Stephanie Palmhert; Kim Seebach	Girls'	Ocampo – Pacheco (ECU); L 0–2	6	did not advance					31
Stephanie Palmhert; Kim Seebach	Girls'	Lassyuta – Pimenova (KAZ); L 0–2	6	did not advance					31
Stephanie Palmhert; Kim Seebach	Girls'	Graudina – Kravcenoka (LAT); L 0–2 (9–21, 10–21)	6	did not advance					31

== Cycling ==
Namibia qualified a boys' team based on its ranking issued by the UCI.

Team

Athletes	Event	Cross-Country Eliminator		Time Trial			BMX		Cross-Country Race			Road Race			Total Pts	Rank
Athletes	Event	Rank	Points	Time	Rank	Points	Rank	Points	Time	Rank	Points	Time	Rank	Points	Total Pts	Rank
Tristan de Lange; Pascal Marggraff	Boys' Team	9	15	5:40.65	28	0	25	0	58:18	7	25	1:42:39; 1:37:29	48; 29	0	40	16

Mixed Relay

Athletes	Event	Cross-Country Girls' Race	Cross-Country Boys' Race	Boys' Road Race	Girls' Road Race	Total Time	Rank
Kimberley le Court de Billot (MRI); Tristan de Lange (NAM); Pascal Marggraff (NAM); Milena Wong Wing Wah (MRI)	Mixed Team Relay	3:28	2:57	5:51	8:05	20:21	25

== Football ==
Namibia has been selected to represent Africa.

=== Girls' Tournament ===
Roster

- Asteria Angula
- Jasmine Baas
- Chaan Beukes
- Chelsea de Gouveia
- Luzane de Wee
- Revival Gawanas
- Christophine Hanse
- Ignacia Haoses
- Queandra Kasume Batista
- Ivone Kooper
- Mbitjitandjambi Mungunda
- Nondiyo Noreses
- Tarakuje Rukero
- Anna Shaende
- Ashley Solomons
- Vetjiwa Tjivau
- Beverly Uueziua
- Bianca van Wyk

Group stage

Team	Pld	W	D	L	GF	GA	GD	Pts
China	2	2	0	0	12	0	+12	6
Mexico	2	1	0	1	9	2	+7	3
Namibia	2	0	0	2	0	19	−19	0

17 August 2014
20:45

Mexico	9–0	Namibia
Montserrat Hernandez 19', 59'; Daniela Garcia 21', 44'; Alejandra Zaragoza 30', 55', 76'; Dayana Cazares 72'; Maria Acedo 79'	Report

Wutaishan Stadium, Nanjing
Attendance: 4,503
Referee: Marilin Miranda (Paraguay)

20 August 2014
20:45

Namibia	0–10	China
	Report	Wan Wenting 9'; Zhang Jiayun 13', 62'; Ma Xiaolan 19', 24', 30', 45'; Jin Kun 43'; Wang Yanwen 54'; Fang Jie 66'

Wutaishan Stadium, Nanjing
Attendance: 4,350
Referee: Anna-Marie Keighley (New Zealand)

Fifth place match

25 August 2014
20:45

Papua New Guinea	3–2	Namibia
Bellinda Giada 1', 29'; Marity Sep 34'	Report	Ignacia Haoses 16'; Ivone Kooper 40+1'

Jiangning Sports Center, Nanjing
Attendance: 8,102
Referee: He Jin (China)

== Gymnastics ==
=== Trampoline ===
Namibia qualified one athlete based on its performance at the 2014 African Trampoline Championships. Later Namibia was given a quota to compete by the tripartite committee.

Athlete	Event	Qualification		Final	
Athlete	Event	Score	Rank	Score	Rank
Reinhardt van Zyl	Boys	53.570	12	Did not advance	
Jivanka Kruger	Girls	80.710	11	Did not advance	

== Swimming ==
Namibia qualified three swimmers.

Boys

Athlete	Event	Heat		Semifinal		Final	
Athlete	Event	Time	Rank	Time	Rank	Time	Rank
Lushano Lamprecht	100 m backstroke	58.94	31	did not advance			
Lushano Lamprecht	200 m backstroke	2:05.80	18	—N/a		did not advance	

Girls

Athlete	Event	Heat		Semifinal		Final	
Athlete	Event	Time	Rank	Time	Rank	Time	Rank
Sonja Adbelaar	200 m freestyle	2:09.58	33	—N/a		did not advance	
Sonja Adbelaar	200 m individual medley	2:22.54	19	—N/a		did not advance	
Zanre Oberholzer	50 m backstroke	30.39	27	did not advance			
Zanre Oberholzer	100 m backstroke	1:04.52	21	did not advance			
Zanre Oberholzer	200 m backstroke	2:18.36	18	—N/a		did not advance	

== Tennis ==
Namibia was given a quota to compete by the tripartite committee.

Singles

Athlete	Event	Round of 32	Round of 16	Quarterfinals	Semifinals	Final / BM	Rank
Athlete	Event	Opposition Score	Opposition Score	Opposition Score	Opposition Score	Opposition Score	Rank
Lesedi Sheya Jacobs	Girls' Singles	Vondroušová (CZE); L 1–2; 6–4, 1–6, 0–6	did not advance				17

Doubles

Athletes	Event	Round of 32	Round of 16	Quarterfinals	Semifinals	Final / BM	Rank
Athletes	Event	Opposition Score	Opposition Score	Opposition Score	Opposition Score	Opposition Score	Rank
Lesedi Sheya Jacobs (NAM); Sandra Samir (EGY)	Girls' Doubles	—N/a	Giangreco Campiz (PAR); González (ECU); L 0–2; 3–6, 5–7	did not advance			9
Lesedi Sheya Jacobs (NAM); Guy Orly Iradukunda (BDI)	Mixed Doubles	Ducu (ROU); Zukas (ARG); L 0–2; 3–6, 1–6	did not advance				17
