= Eritrea at the 2014 Summer Youth Olympics =

- IOC code: ERI
- NOC: Eritrean National Olympic Committee

in Nanjing
- Competitors: 3 in 2 sports
- Medals: Gold 0 Silver 0 Bronze 0 Total 0

Summer Youth Olympics appearances
- 2010; 2014; 2018

Eritrea competed at the 2014 Summer Youth Olympics, in Nanjing, China from 16 August to 28 August 2014.

== Athletics ==
Eritrea qualified one athlete.

Qualification Legend: Q=Final A (medal); qB=Final B (non-medal); qC=Final C (non-medal); qD=Final D (non-medal); qE=Final E (non-medal)

Girls
Track & road events

Athlete	Event	Heats		Final	
Athlete	Event	Result	Rank	Result	Rank
Simret Weldeghabr Gebrekestos	3000 m	9:34.73	10 Q	9:30.65	10

== Cycling ==
Eritrea was given an invitation by the tripartite commission.

Team

Athletes	Event	Cross-Country Eliminator		Time Trial			BMX		Cross-Country Race			Road Race			Total Pts	Rank
Athletes	Event	Rank	Points	Time	Rank	Points	Rank	Points	Time	Rank	Points	Time	Rank	Points	Total Pts	Rank
Abraham Mehari Tekle; Abel Teweldemedhn Kifle	Boys' Team	DNS	0	5:35.29	26	0	DNS	0	DNS		0	1:37:42; 1:43:55	35; 49	0	0	31
