= Kuwait at the 2014 Summer Youth Olympics =

- IOC code: KUW
- NOC: Kuwait Olympic Committee

in Nanjing
- Competitors: 5 in 4 sports
- Medals: Gold 0 Silver 0 Bronze 0 Total 0

Summer Youth Olympics appearances
- 2010; 2014; 2018

Kuwait competed at the 2014 Summer Youth Olympics, in Nanjing, China from 16 August to 28 August 2014.

== Athletics ==
Kuwait qualified two athletes.

Qualification Legend: Q=Final A (medal); qB=Final B (non-medal); qC=Final C (non-medal); qD=Final D (non-medal); qE=Final E (non-medal)

Boys
Track & road events

Athlete	Event	Heats		Final	
Athlete	Event	Result	Rank	Result	Rank
Meshaal Almutairi	100 m	10.82	7 Q	10.80	5

Field Events

Athlete	Event	Qualification		Final	
Athlete	Event	Distance	Rank	Distance	Rank
Mobarak Qambar	Long jump	6.71	11 qB	6.50	11

== Fencing ==
Kuwait qualified one athlete based on its performance at the 2014 FIE Cadet World Championships.

Boys

Athlete	Event	Pool Round	Seed	Round of 16	Quarterfinals	Semifinals	Final / BM	Rank
Athlete	Event	Opposition Score	Seed	Opposition Score	Opposition Score	Opposition Score	Opposition Score	Rank
Bandar Alshamlan	Sabre	Y Yan (CHN); L 2 – 5 T Cucu (ROU); L 2 – 5 K Dongju (KOR); L 3 – 5 M Almusawi (IRQ); W 5 – 4 M Ayman (EGY); W 5 – 1 I Ilin (RUS); L 4 – 5	11	K Dongju (KOR); L 12 – 15	did not advance			12

== Shooting ==
Kuwait was given a quota to compete by the tripartite committee.

Individual

Athlete	Event	Qualification		Final	
Athlete	Event	Points	Rank	Points	Rank
Hebah Arzouqi	Girls' 10m Air Rifle	408.6	11	did not advance	

Team

Athletes	Event	Qualification		Round of 16	Quarterfinals	Semifinals	Final / BM	Rank
Athletes	Event	Points	Rank	Opposition Result	Opposition Result	Opposition Result	Opposition Result	Rank
Hebah Arzouqi (KUW); Tomohiko Hasegawa (JPN)	Mixed Team 10m Air Rifle	802.4	19	did not advance				

== Swimming ==
Kuwait qualified one swimmer.

Boys

Athlete	Event	Heat		Semifinal		Final	
Athlete	Event	Time	Rank	Time	Rank	Time	Rank
Waleed Abdulrazzaq	50 m butterfly	26.62	38	did not advance			
