= Albania at the 2014 Summer Youth Olympics =

- IOC code: ALB
- NOC: Albanian National Olympic Committee
- Website: nocalbania.org.al

in Nanjing
- Competitors: 5 in 3 sports
- Flag bearer: Noel Borshi
- Medals: Gold 0 Silver 0 Bronze 0 Total 0

Summer Youth Olympics appearances (overview)
- 2010; 2014; 2018

Albania competed at the 2014 Summer Youth Olympics, in Nanjing, China from 16 August to 28 August 2014.

== Athletics ==
Albania qualified two athletes.

Qualification Legend: Q=Final A (medal); qB=Final B (non-medal); qC=Final C (non-medal); qD=Final D (non-medal); qE=Final E (non-medal)

Boys
Field Events

Athlete	Event	Qualification		Final	
Athlete	Event	Distance	Rank	Distance	Rank
Saud Bashku	Triple jump	13.69	16 qB	DNS	

Girls
Track & road events

Athlete	Event	Heats		Final	
Athlete	Event	Result	Rank	Result	Rank
Eneda Deliu	200 m	27.31	19 qC	DNS	

== Cycling ==
Albania qualified a boys' team based on its ranking issued by the UCI.

Team

Athletes	Event	Cross-Country Eliminator		Time Trial			BMX		Cross-Country Race			Road Race			Total Pts	Rank
Athletes	Event	Rank	Points	Time	Rank	Points	Rank	Points	Time	Rank	Points	Time	Rank	Points	Total Pts	Rank
Ridion Kopshti; Realdo Ramaliu	Boys' team	28	0	5:27.95	21	0	24	0	-4 LAP	28	0	1:37:23; 1:37:54	17; 42	0	0	27

Mixed relay

Athletes	Event	Cross-Country Girls' Race	Cross-Country Boys' Race	Boys' Road Race	Girls' Road Race	Total Time	Rank
Maria Rodriguez Navarrete (ESP); Realdo Ramaliu (ALB); Ridion Kopshti (ALB); Elisabet Escursell Valero (ESP)	Mixed team relay	3:31	3:29	5:52	6:41	19:33	18

== Swimming ==
Albania qualified one swimmer.

Girls

Athlete	Event	Heat		Final	
Athlete	Event	Time	Rank	Time	Rank
Noel Borshi	200 m butterfly	2:23.13	26	did not advance	
