= Mauritius at the 2014 Summer Youth Olympics =

- IOC code: MRI
- NOC: Mauritius Olympic Committee

in Nanjing
- Competitors: 4 in 3 sports
- Medals: Gold 0 Silver 0 Bronze 0 Total 0

Summer Youth Olympics appearances
- 2010; 2014; 2018

Mauritius competed at the 2014 Summer Youth Olympics, in Nanjing, China from 16 August to 28 August 2014.

== Athletics ==
Mauritius qualified one athlete.

Qualification Legend: Q=Final A (medal); qB=Final B (non-medal); qC=Final C (non-medal); qD=Final D (non-medal); qE=Final E (non-medal)

Boys
Track & road events

Athlete	Event	Heats		Final	
Athlete	Event	Result	Rank	Result	Rank
Jean Lozereau	100 m	11.76	26 qC	DNS	

== Cycling ==
Mauritius qualified a girls' team based on its ranking issued by the UCI.

Team

Athletes	Event	Cross-Country Eliminator		Time Trial			BMX		Cross-Country Race			Road Race			Total Pts	Rank
Athletes	Event	Rank	Points	Time	Rank	Points	Rank	Points	Time	Rank	Points	Time	Rank	Points	Total Pts	Rank
Kimberley le Court de Billot; Milena Wong Wing Wah	Girls' Team	28	0	6:12.30	11	8	30	0	47:58	7	25	1:12:36; 1:33:02	5; 55	40	73	17

Mixed Relay

Athletes	Event	Cross-Country Girls' Race	Cross-Country Boys' Race	Boys' Road Race	Girls' Road Race	Total Time	Rank
Kimberley le Court de Billot (MRI); Tristan de Lange (NAM); Pascal Marggraff (NAM); Milena Wong Wing Wah (MRI)	Mixed Team Relay	3:28	2:57	5:51	8:05	20:21	25

== Swimming ==
Mauritius qualified one swimmer.

Girls

Athlete	Event	Heat		Semifinal		Final	
Athlete	Event	Time	Rank	Time	Rank	Time	Rank
Elodie Poo Cheong	50 m butterfly	29.07	25	did not advance			
Elodie Poo Cheong	100 m butterfly	1:04.42	23	did not advance			
