= Gezelle Magerman =

South African hurdler (born 1997)

Personal information
- Born: 21 April 1997 (age 29) Darling, Western Cape, South Africa

Sport
- Country: South Africa
- Sport: Track and field
- Event: 400 metre hurdles
- Coached by: Zeney van der Walt; Maritza Coetzee
Medal record
Track and field
Representing South Africa
Youth Olympic Games
Gold medal – first place	2014 Nanjing	Girls' 400m hurdles
African U20 Championships
Gold medal – first place	2015 Addis Abeba	Women's 400m hurdles

Gezelle Magerman (born 21 April 1997) is a South African hurdler who competes in international elite competition. She is a former Youth Olympic Games champion and an African U20 champion in the 400 metre hurdles.

Magerman matriculated from La Rochelle Girls' High School and attended the University of Pretoria.
