= Bhutan at the 2014 Summer Youth Olympics =

- IOC code: BHU
- NOC: Bhutan Olympic Committee

in Nanjing
- Competitors: 2 in 2 sports
- Medals: Gold 0 Silver 0 Bronze 0 Total 0

Summer Youth Olympics appearances
- 2010; 2014; 2018

Bhutan competed at the 2014 Summer Youth Olympics, in Nanjing, China from 16 August to 28 August 2014.

== Athletics ==
Bhutan qualified one athlete.

Qualification Legend: Q=Final A (medal); qB=Final B (non-medal); qC=Final C (non-medal); qD=Final D (non-medal); qE=Final E (non-medal)

Girls
Track & road events

Athlete	Event	Heats		Final	
Athlete	Event	Result	Rank	Result	Rank
Sangay Wangmo	200 m	30.87	23 qC	30.91	21

== Shooting ==
Bhutan was given a quota to compete by the tripartite committee.

Individual

Athlete	Event	Qualification		Final	
Athlete	Event	Points	Rank	Points	Rank
Chimi Rinzin	Boys' 10m Air Rifle	581.3	20	did not advance	

Team

Athletes	Event	Qualification		Round of 16	Quarterfinals	Semifinals	Final / BM	Rank
Athletes	Event	Points	Rank	Opposition Result	Opposition Result	Opposition Result	Opposition Result	Rank
Chimi Rinzin (BHU); Sarah Hornung (SUI)	Mixed Team 10m Air Rifle	793.1	20	did not advance				
