= Zambia at the 2014 Summer Youth Olympics =

- IOC code: ZAM
- NOC: National Olympic Committee of Zambia
- Website: www.nocz.co.zm

in Nanjing
- Competitors: 24 in 4 sports
- Medals Ranked 49th: Gold 1 Silver 0 Bronze 0 Total 1

Summer Youth Olympics appearances
- 2010; 2014; 2018

Zambia competed at the 2014 Summer Youth Olympics, in Nanjing, China from 16 August to 28 August 2014.

== Athletics ==
Zambia qualified four athletes.

Qualification Legend: Q=Final A (medal); qB=Final B (non-medal); qC=Final C (non-medal); qD=Final D (non-medal); qE=Final E (non-medal)

Boys
Track & road events

Athlete	Event	Heats		Final	
Athlete	Event	Result	Rank	Result	Rank
Sydney Siame	100 m	10.58	2 Q	10.56	1st place, gold medalist(s)
Brian Kasinda	200 m	21.40	7 Q	21.61	5
Godfrey Chama	800 m	1:51.29 PB	8 Q	1:52.42	7

Girls
Track & road events

Athlete	Event	Heats		Final	
Athlete	Event	Result	Rank	Result	Rank
Deophister Chongo	200 m	25.99 YC	14	25.59 PB	6

== Field hockey ==
Zambia qualified a boys' and girls' team based on its performance at the African Qualification Tournament.

=== Boys' tournament ===
Roster

- Lombe Bwalya
- Shadrick Katele
- Blessing Lowole
- Richard Lungu
- Alfred Mpande
- Victor Mwansa
- Brighton Siwale
- Samuel Tagwireyi
- Samson Tembo

Group Stage

Pos	Team	Pld	W	D	L	GF	GA	GD	Pts	Qualification
1	New Zealand	4	3	1	0	28	12	+16	10	Quarterfinals
2	Pakistan	4	3	1	0	27	12	+15	10	Quarterfinals
3	Mexico	4	1	0	3	11	20	−9	3	Quarterfinals
4	Zambia	4	1	0	3	14	24	−10	3	Quarterfinals
5	Germany	4	1	0	3	10	22	−12	3	

Source: FIH
Rules for classification: 1) points; 2) goal difference; 3) goals scored; 4) head-to-head result.

17 August 2014
18:00

New Zealand	8–2	Zambia
Phillips 5', 10', 36'; Capizzi 8'; Brydon 14'; Sarikaya 24'; Newman 26', 33'	Report	Lowole 12'; Bwalya 19'

Umpires:
Sompop Boonsong (THA)
Oliver Tarnoczi (AUT)

18 August 2014
17:30

Germany	1–8	Zambia
Grossmann 36'	Report	Mpande 1', 5', 34', 36'; Tembo 18', 28'; Lowole 31', 32'

Umpires:
Epeli Tukuca (FIJ)
Paul Walker (GBR)

19 August 2014
21:00

Mexico	6–2	Zambia
Salas 7', 8', 11'; Gomez 18'; Falcon 31'; Martinez 34'	Report	Lowole 5'; Mpande 35'

Umpires:
Scott Embry (AUS)
Duvaughn Henlon (JAM)

20 August 2014
20:30

Zambia	2–9	Pakistan
Lowole 5'; Mpande 8'	Report	Malid 2', 5', 23'; Kamal 12'; Atiq 13', 30', 36'; Mahmood 17'; Ali 22'

Umpires:
Aziz Adimah (GHA)
Epeli Tukuca (FIJ)

Quarterfinals

23 August 2014
19:00

Spain	10–1	Zambia
Suarez 3', 20'; Rosell 4', 29'; Fabregas 7'; Grau 19'; Fortuny 21', 30'; Castejon 34'; Alcalde 36'	Report	Tagwireyi 26'

Umpires:
Epeli Tukuca (FIJ)
Scott Embry (AUS)

Crossover

25 August 2014
16:30

Zambia	2–5	Pakistan
Bwalya 10'; Lowole 22'	Report	Malik 13'; Ali 23'; Yaqoob 26'; Irshad 29'; Mahmood 33'

Umpires:
Sherif Elamari (EGY)
Sompop Boonsong (THA)

Seventh and eighth place

27 August 2014
16:00

Zambia	7–4	Mexico
Mpande 4', 30'; Mwansa 11'; Katele 18'; Lowole 23', 24', 36'	Report	Diaz 12', 24'; Martinez 28'; Falcon 36'

Umpires:
Oliver Tarnoczi (AUT)
Scott Embry (AUS)

=== Girls' tournament ===
Roster

- Catherine Kalomo
- Eniless Mambwe
- Loveness Mudenda
- Angel Muswema
- Esther Mwale
- Tionge Mwale
- Carol Nakombe
- Martha Nankala
- Comfort Phiri

Group Stage

Pos	Team	Pld	W	D	L	GF	GA	GD	Pts	Qualification
1	China	4	4	0	0	29	3	+26	12	Quarterfinals
2	Uruguay	4	3	0	1	19	8	+11	9	Quarterfinals
3	New Zealand	4	2	0	2	20	20	0	6	Quarterfinals
4	Germany	4	1	0	3	8	23	−15	3	Quarterfinals
5	Zambia	4	0	0	4	8	30	−22	0	

Source: FIH
Rules for classification: 1) points; 2) goal difference; 3) goals scored; 4) head-to-head result.

17 August 2014
16:00

China	8–0	Zambia
Zhang Xindan 4', 16', 25'; Zhang Jinrong 18'; Tu Yidan 32'; Chen Yang 34'; Zhang Lijia 35'; Zhong Jiaqi 36'	Report

Umpires:
Toh Li Min (SIN)
Lucy Townend (NZL)

18 August 2014
20:30

New Zealand	10–5	Zambia
Tinning 5', 17'; Kwek 9', 24'; Brown 11', 34'; Waddell 22'; White 24'; Davies 28'; Kiddle 36'	Report	Kalomo 15', 16', 21'; Nakombe 20'; Mudenda 32'

Umpires:
Denise Pelletier (CAN)
Ivona Makar (CRO)

19 August 2014
20:30

Uruguay	7–1	Zambia
Gaminara 5', 20', 30'; Saenz 13', 18', 27', 32'	Report	Mudenda 31'

Umpires:
Emily Carroll (AUS)
Denise Pelletier (CAN)

20 August 2014
21:00

Zambia	2–5	Germany
Kalomo 2'; Mambwe 33'	Report	Angerer 9'; Hohenhovel 14'; Jeltsch 29'; Baumgarten 31'; Scheidl 34'

Umpires:
Liu Lijie (CHN)
Toh Li Min (SIN)

Ninth and tenth place

24 August 2014
16:00

Fiji	1–6	Zambia
Dutta 22'	Report	Mudenda 7', 29', 32'; Mambwe 9'; Phiri 27'; Nankala 34'

Umpires:
Emily Carroll (AUS)
Toh Li Min (SIN)

== Judo ==
Zambia was given a quota to compete by the tripartite committee.

Individual

Athlete	Event	Round of 32	Round of 16	Quarterfinals	Semifinals	Rep 1	Rep 2	Rep 3	Rep 4	Final / BM	Rank
Athlete	Event	Opposition Result	Opposition Result	Opposition Result	Opposition Result	Opposition Result	Opposition Result	Opposition Result	Opposition Result	Opposition Result	Rank
Nokutula Banda	Girls' -63 kg	—	Gercsák (HUN); L 000-100	did not advance		—	Carminucci (ITA); W 010-000	Polleres (AUT); L 000-100	did not advance		11

Team

Athletes	Event	Round of 16	Quarterfinals	Semifinals	Final	Rank
Athletes	Event	Opposition Result	Opposition Result	Opposition Result	Opposition Result	Rank
Team Van De Walle; Paola Acevedo (PUR); Leyla Aliyeva (AZE); Nokutula Banda (ZAM); Marco Montoya (COL); Ivan Silva Morales (CUB); Unelle Snyman (RSA); Peta Zadro (BIH)	Mixed Team	Bye	Team Geesink (MIX); L 3 – 4	did not advance		5

== Swimming ==
Zambia qualified one swimmer.

Boys

Athlete	Event	Heat		Semifinal		Final	
Athlete	Event	Time	Rank	Time	Rank	Time	Rank
Ralph Goveia	50 m butterfly	25.33	22	did not advance			
Ralph Goveia	100 m butterfly	56.16	18	did not advance			
