= Bhutan at the 2010 Summer Youth Olympics =

- IOC code: BHU
- NOC: Bhutan Olympic Committee

in Singapore
- Competitors: 1 in 1 sport
- Flag bearer: Chimi Wangmo

Summer Youth Olympics appearances
- 2010; 2014; 2018

The following is a summary of the participation of Bhutan at the 2010 Summer Youth Olympics, held in Singapore between 14–26 August 2010.

Chimi Wangmo in Taekwondo was the only athlete to represent Bhutan. She was also the flag bearer in the Opening ceremony. She lost in the quarterfinal round of the Women's 49 kg Taekwondo event against American Jessie Bates, who later won Bronze in the event.

== Taekwondo ==
Athlete	Event	Preliminary	Quarterfinal	Semifinal	Final	Rank
Chimi Wangmo	Girls' -49kg	BYE	Jessie Bates (USA); L RSC R2 0:25	did not advance		5
