= American Samoa at the 2014 Summer Youth Olympics =

- IOC code: ASA
- NOC: American Samoa National Olympic Committee

in Nanjing
- Competitors: 5 in 2 sports
- Medals: Gold 0 Silver 0 Bronze 0 Total 0

Summer Youth Olympics appearances
- 2010; 2014; 2018; 2026

American Samoa competed at the 2014 Summer Youth Olympics in Nanjing, China from 16 August to 28 August 2014.

== Athletics ==
American Samoa qualified one athlete.

Qualification Legend: Q=Final A (medal); qB=Final B (non-medal); qC=Final C (non-medal); qD=Final D (non-medal); qE=Final E (non-medal)

Boys
Track & road events

Athlete	Event	Heats		Final	
Athlete	Event	Result	Rank	Result	Rank
Faresa Kapisi	100 m	12.03	30 qD	DNS	

== Wrestling ==
American Samoa qualified four athletes based on its performance at the 2014 Oceania Cadet Championships.

Boys

Athlete	Event	Group stage				Final / RM	Rank
Athlete	Event	Opposition Score	Opposition Score	Opposition Score	Rank	Opposition Score	Rank
Faifua Ipolito	Freestyle -46kg	P Kolekar (IND); L 0 – 4	I Gadzhiev (RUS); L 0 – 4	O Tigreros (COL); L 0 – 4	4 Q	M Gurdian (NCA); L 0 – 4	8
Iafeta Vou	Freestyle -76kg	A Gurm (CAN); L 0 – 4	S Hovsepyan (ARM); L 0 – 4	Y Yamasaki (JPN); L 0 – 4	4 Q	C Rivera (HON); L 0 – 4	8
Jordan Leilua	Greco-Roman -42kg	H Belghelam (ALG); L 0 – 4	F Aslan (TUR); L 1 – 4	O Masyk (UKR); L 0 – 4	4	—N/a	7
Schey-Xyong McMoore	Greco-Roman -85kg	T Okhonov (TJK); L 0 – 4	R Khehira (CAN); L 0 – 4	M Bemalian (RUS); L 0 – 4	4 Q	J Kalaba (SRB); L 0 – 4	8
