= Pakistan at the 2014 Summer Youth Olympics =

- IOC code: PAK
- NOC: Pakistan Olympic Association

in Nanjing
- Competitors: 12 in 4 sports
- Medals: Gold 0 Silver 0 Bronze 0 Total 0

Summer Youth Olympics appearances
- 2010; 2014; 2018; 2026

Pakistan competed at the 2014 Summer Youth Olympics, in Nanjing, China from 16 August to 28 August 2014. The country did not win any medals at the Games.

== Field hockey ==
Pakistan qualified a boys team by winning the Boys U16 Asia Cup.

=== Boys' tournament ===
Roster

- Mubashar Ali
- Muhammad Atiq
- Muhammad Sheraz Hafeez
- Shan Irshad
- Muhammad Junaid Kamal
- Muhammad Bilal Mahmood
- Nohaiz Malik
- Sikandar Mustafa
- Mohammad Azfar Yaqoob

Group Stage

Pos	Team	Pld	W	D	L	GF	GA	GD	Pts	Qualification
1	New Zealand	4	3	1	0	28	12	+16	10	Quarterfinals
2	Pakistan	4	3	1	0	27	12	+15	10	Quarterfinals
3	Mexico	4	1	0	3	11	20	−9	3	Quarterfinals
4	Zambia	4	1	0	3	14	24	−10	3	Quarterfinals
5	Germany	4	1	0	3	10	22	−12	3	

Source: FIH
Rules for classification: 1) points; 2) goal difference; 3) goals scored; 4) head-to-head result.

17 August 2014
21:00

Pakistan	6–2	Mexico
Atiq 3'; Ali 6'; Irshad 8', 26'; Yaqoob 30'; Mahmood 34'	Report	Jacobo 23'; Gomez 35'

Umpires:
Sherif Elamari (EGY)
Donovan Simmons (BER)

19 August 2014
18:00

Pakistan	6–2	Germany
Atiq 6'; Ali 8', 29'; Irshad 12'; Mahmood 16'; Malik 18'	Report	Schneider 9'; Grossmann 21'

Umpires:
Paul Walker (GBR)
Aziz Adimah (GHA)

20 August 2014
20:30

Zambia	2–9	Pakistan
Lowole 5'; Mpande 8'	Report	Malid 2', 5', 23'; Kamal 12'; Atiq 13', 30', 36'; Mahmood 17'; Ali 22'

Umpires:
Aziz Adimah (GHA)
Epeli Tukuca (FIJ)

21 August 2014
19:00

Pakistan	6–6	New Zealand
Atiq 15', 27'; Irshad 18', 30'; Ali 29'; Kamal 31'	Report	Brydon 2'; Sarikaya 7'; Capizzi 12'; Newman 13'; Thomas 14', 22'

Umpires:
Donovan Simmons (BER)
Duvaughn Henlon (JAM)

Quarterfinal

23 August 2014
19:30

Pakistan	7–7	Canada
Mahmood 10'; Atiq 23', 36'; Irshad 23'; Malik 25', 34'; Ali 32'	Report	A. Sidhu 4', 13'; Sandhu 6'; Pereira 16', 22'; H. Sidhu 30', 35'
Penalties
Irshad (penalty shoot-out missed); Atiq (penalty shoot-out scored); Mahmood (penalty shoot-out scored); Atiq (penalty shoot-out missed); Irshad (penalty shoot-out missed)	2–3	(penalty shoot-out missed) A. Sidhu; (penalty shoot-out scored) Panesar; (penalty shoot-out scored) Sandhu; (penalty shoot-out missed) Panesar; (penalty shoot-out scored) Sandhu

Umpires:
Paul Walker (GBR)
Rawi Anbananthan (MAS)

Crossover

25 August 2014
16:30

Zambia	2–5	Pakistan
Bwalya 10'; Lowole 22'	Report	Malik 13'; Ali 23'; Yaqoob 26'; Irshad 29'; Mahmood 33'

Umpires:
Sherif Elamari (EGY)
Sompop Boonsong (THA)

Fifth and sixth place

27 August 2014
17:30

Pakistan	4–3	New Zealand
Ali 14'; Yaqoob 15'; Irshad 22', 27'	Report	Capizzi 8'; Wilcox 18'; Newman 19'

Umpires:
Duvaughn Henlon (JAM)
Sherif Elamari (EGY)

== Shooting ==
Pakistan was given a quota to compete by the tripartite committee.

Individual

Athlete	Event	Qualification		Final	
Athlete	Event	Points	Rank	Points	Rank
Javeria Shafqat	Girls' 10m Air Pistol	355	20	did not advance	

Team

Athletes	Event	Qualification		Round of 16	Quarterfinals	Semifinals	Final / BM	Rank
Athletes	Event	Points	Rank	Opposition Result	Opposition Result	Opposition Result	Opposition Result	Rank
Javeria Shafqat (PAK); Pavlo Korostylov (UKR)	Mixed Team 10m Air Pistol		Q	Downing (AUS)- Todorov (BUL); L	did not advance			17

== Swimming ==
Pakistan qualified one swimmer.

Boys

Athlete	Event	Heat		Semifinal		Final	
Athlete	Event	Time	Rank	Time	Rank	Time	Rank
Haris Bandey	100 m butterfly	1:05.03	25	did not advance			

== Weightlifting ==
Pakistan has received tripartite invitation.

Boys

Athlete	Event	Snatch		Clean & jerk		Total	Rank
Athlete	Event	Result	Rank	Result	Rank	Total	Rank
Abdur Rehman	−77 kg	106	8	133	7	239	8
