= Burkina Faso at the 2014 Summer Youth Olympics =

- IOC code: BUR
- NOC: Burkinabé National Olympic and Sports Committee

in Nanjing
- Competitors: 3 in 2 sports

Summer Youth Olympics appearances
- 2010; 2014; 2018

Burkina Faso competed at the 2014 Summer Youth Olympics, in Nanjing, China from 16 August to 28 August 2014.

== Athletics ==
Burkina Faso qualified two athletes.

Qualification Legend: Q=Final A (medal); qB=Final B (non-medal); qC=Final C (non-medal); qD=Final D (non-medal); qE=Final E (non-medal)

Boys
Field Events

Athlete	Event	Qualification		Final	
Athlete	Event	Distance	Rank	Distance	Rank
Mohamed Ouayyara	Triple jump	14.12	14 qB	13.72	14

Girls
Track & road events

Athlete	Event	Heats		Final	
Athlete	Event	Result	Rank	Result	Rank
Arzita Nimi	100 m	13.10	20 qC	DNS	

== Swimming ==
Burkina Faso qualified one swimmer.

Boys

Athlete	Event	Heat		Semifinal		Final	
Athlete	Event	Time	Rank	Time	Rank	Time	Rank
Abdoul Nignan	50 m breaststroke	40.08	38	did not advance			
