= Suriname at the 2014 Summer Youth Olympics =

- IOC code: SUR
- NOC: Suriname Olympic Committee

in Nanjing
- Competitors: 6 in 4 sports
- Medals Ranked 49th: Gold 1 Silver 0 Bronze 0 Total 1

Summer Youth Olympics appearances
- 2010; 2014; 2018; 2026

Suriname competed at the 2014 Summer Youth Olympics, in Nanjing, China that transpired between 16 August and 28 August 2014.

== Medalists ==
Medal	Name	Sport	Event	Date
Gold	Miguel van Assen	Athletics	Boys' Triple jump	25 August

== Athletics ==
Suriname qualified two athletes.

Qualification Legend: Q=Final A (medal); qB=Final B (non-medal); qC=Final C (non-medal); qD=Final D (non-medal); qE=Final E (non-medal)

Boys
Field Events

Athlete	Event	Qualification		Final	
Athlete	Event	Distance	Rank	Distance	Rank
Dave Pika	Long jump	6.85	10 qB	6.70	10
Miguel van Assen	Triple jump	16.29	1 Q	16.15	1st place, gold medalist(s)

== Badminton ==
Suriname was given a quota to compete by the tripartite committee.

Singles

Athlete	Event	Group stage				Quarterfinal	Semifinal	Final / BM	Rank
Athlete	Event	Opposition Score	Opposition Score	Opposition Score	Rank	Opposition Score	Opposition Score	Opposition Score	Rank
Rugshaar Ishaak	Girls' Singles	B Ongbumrungpan (THA); L 0 – 2	A Chen (NED); L 0 – 2	L Courtois (FRA); L 0 – 2	4	did not advance			

Doubles

Athlete	Event	Group stage				Quarterfinal	Semifinal	Final / BM	Rank
Athlete	Event	Opposition Score	Opposition Score	Opposition Score	Rank	Opposition Score	Opposition Score	Opposition Score	Rank
Rugshaar Ishaak (SUR); Max Weisskirchen (GER)	Mixed Doubles	K Beton (SLO); A Ginting (INA); L 0 – 2	L Heim (GER); V Shishkov (BUL); W 2 – 0	M Pavlinic (CRO); M Kurt (TUR); L 0 – 2	3	did not advance			

== Swimming ==
Suriname qualified two swimmers.

Boys

Athlete	Event	Heat		Semifinal		Final	
Athlete	Event	Time	Rank	Time	Rank	Time	Rank
Zuhayr Pigot	50 m freestyle	23.99	24	did not advance			
Zuhayr Pigot	100 m freestyle	52.70	30	did not advance			
Zuhayr Pigot	50 m butterfly	25.08	17	did not advance			
Zuhayr Pigot	100 m butterfly	55.19	11 Q	55.09	14	did not advance	

Girls

Athlete	Event	Heat		Semifinal		Final	
Athlete	Event	Time	Rank	Time	Rank	Time	Rank
Brienne Renfurm	50 m backstroke	31.43	35	did not advance			
Brienne Renfurm	100 m backstroke	1:09.70	33	did not advance			

== Taekwondo ==
Suriname was given a wild card to compete.

Boys

Athlete	Event	Round of 16	Quarterfinals	Semifinals	Final	Rank
Athlete	Event	Opposition Result	Opposition Result	Opposition Result	Opposition Result	Rank
Alessandro Getrouw	−63 kg	Bye	Ennadiri (NED); L 9 – 21(PTG)	did not advance		5
