= Mauritania at the 2014 Summer Youth Olympics =

- IOC code: MTN
- NOC: Comité National Olympique et Sportif Mauritanien

in Nanjing
- Competitors: 3 in 2 sports
- Medals: Gold 0 Silver 0 Bronze 0 Total 0

Summer Youth Olympics appearances
- 2010; 2014; 2018

Mauritania competed at the 2014 Summer Youth Olympics, in Nanjing, China from 16 August to 28 August 2014.

== Athletics ==
Mauritania qualified two athletes.

Qualification Legend: Q=Final A (medal); qB=Final B (non-medal); qC=Final C (non-medal); qD=Final D (non-medal); qE=Final E (non-medal)

Boys
Track & road events

Athlete	Event	Heats		Final	
Athlete	Event	Result	Rank	Result	Rank
Cheikh Beya	100 m	14.29	32 qD	DNS	

Girls
Track & road events

Athlete	Event	Heats		Final	
Athlete	Event	Result	Rank	Result	Rank
Maimouna Cisse	800 m	DSQ qC		DNS	

== Taekwondo ==
Mauritania was given a wild card to compete.

Boys

Athlete	Event	Round of 16	Quarterfinals	Semifinals	Final	Rank
Athlete	Event	Opposition Result	Opposition Result	Opposition Result	Opposition Result	Rank
Mohamed El Mokhtar	−55 kg	Fahd Zaouia (NED); L 5 – 26 (PTG)	did not advance			9
