= Gabon at the 2014 Summer Youth Olympics =

- IOC code: GAB
- NOC: Comité Olympique Gabonais

in Nanjing
- Competitors: 3 in 3 sports
- Medals: Gold 0 Silver 0 Bronze 0 Total 0

Summer Youth Olympics appearances
- 2010; 2014; 2018

Gabon competed at the 2014 Summer Youth Olympics, in Nanjing, China from 16 August to 28 August 2014.

== Athletics ==
Gabon qualified two athletes.

Qualification Legend: Q=Final A (medal); qB=Final B (non-medal); qC=Final C (non-medal); qD=Final D (non-medal); qE=Final E (non-medal)

Girls
Track & road events

Athlete	Event	Heats		Final	
Athlete	Event	Result	Rank	Result	Rank
Leandry-Celeste Digombou Nziengui	200 m	29.74	21 qC	29.94	20

== Judo ==
Individual

Athlete	Event	Round of 32	Round of 16	Quarterfinals	Semifinals	Rep 1	Rep 2	Rep 3	Rep 3	Final / BM	Rank
Athlete	Event	Opposition Result	Opposition Result	Opposition Result	Opposition Result	Opposition Result	Opposition Result	Opposition Result	Opposition Result	Opposition Result	Rank
Sandrine Mbazoghe Endamne	Girls' -52 kg	Bye	S Amrane (ALG); L 0000 – 1012	did not advance		U Minenekova (BLR); L 0000 – 1102	did not advance				17

Team

Athletes	Event	Round of 16	Quarterfinals	Semifinals	Final	Rank
Athletes	Event	Opposition Result	Opposition Result	Opposition Result	Opposition Result	Rank
Team Yamashita; Frank de Wit (NED); Nellie Einstein (SWE); Sandrine Mbazoghe Endamne (GAB); Lubjana Piovesana (GBR); Sara Rodriguez (ESP); Tsogtbaatar Tsend-Ochir (MGL); Jorre Verstraeten (BEL)	Mixed Team	Team Douillet (MIX); L 3^{112} – 3^{200}	did not advance			9

== Taekwondo ==
Gabon was given a wild card to compete.

Boys

Athlete	Event	Round of 16	Quarterfinals	Semifinals	Final	Rank
Athlete	Event	Opposition Result	Opposition Result	Opposition Result	Opposition Result	Rank
Davy Endamne Dzime	−55 kg	E Melki (LIB); L 2 – 23 (PTG)	did not advance			9
