= Kimwaua Makin =

I-Kiribati athletics competitor

Personal information
- Born: 8 August 1997 (age 28)

Sport
- Country: Kiribati
- Sport: Track and field
- Event: sprinter
- Updated on 29 August 2015

Kimwaua Makin (born 8 August 1997) is a male Kiribati sprinter. He competed in the Men's 100 metres event at the 2015 World Championships in Athletics in Beijing, China, finishing seventh in his heat. He ran his personal best of 11.77 at the 2014 Summer Youth Olympics.

Makin won the bronze medal at the 2018 Micronesian Games, setting the Kiribati record in the 4 × 100 m relay in the process running on a team with Tirioro Willie.

== See also ==
- Kiribati at the 2015 World Championships in Athletics
