= Bian Liunian =

Chinese musician, composer and musical director

Bian Liunian (Chinese: 卞留念; pinyin: Biàn Liúniàn) is a Chinese musician, composer and musical director. He is responsible for the musical production of the Beijing 2008 Olympic Closing Ceremony.

Liunian has specialized in playing the two-string fiddle erhu, a Chinese traditional folk instrument. In addition to the erhu he plays over 200 musical instruments. As a composer he creates more than 200 musical works every year.

2001 saw him duet on Erhu with Dj Mel”Herbie”Kent (UK) scratch mixing on turntables to a capacity 73,000 crowd at the Workers Stadium Beijing for the closing ceremony of the Universiade.https://www.bilibili.com/video/BV1ho4y1373b/

He has been the musical director for over 14 years for the CCTV New Year's Gala, one of the most watched television programs in the world.
