= Ivory Coast at the 2014 Summer Youth Olympics =

- IOC code: CIV
- NOC: Comité National Olympique de Côte d'Ivoire

in Nanjing
- Competitors: 4 in 4 sports
- Medals: Gold 0 Silver 0 Bronze 0 Total 0

Summer Youth Olympics appearances
- 2010; 2014; 2018; 2026

Ivory Coast competed at the 2014 Summer Youth Olympics, in Nanjing, China from 16 August to 28 August 2014.

== Athletics ==
Ivory Coast qualified one athlete.

Qualification Legend: Q=Final A (medal); qB=Final B (non-medal); qC=Final C (non-medal); qD=Final D (non-medal); qE=Final E (non-medal)

Girls
Track & road events

Athlete	Event	Heats		Final	
Athlete	Event	Result	Rank	Result	Rank
Maboundou Kone	100 m	12.50	15 qB	12.55	14

== Judo ==
Ivory Coast was given a quota to compete by the tripartite committee.

Individual

Athlete	Event	Round of 16	Quarterfinals	Semifinals	Rep 1	Rep 2	Rep 3	Final / BM	Rank
Athlete	Event	Opposition Result	Opposition Result	Opposition Result	Opposition Result	Opposition Result	Opposition Result	Opposition Result	Rank
Fatim Fofana	Girls' -63 kg	M Polleres (AUT); L 0000 – 1012	did not advance		H Yahaya (NIG); W 0000 – 1000	B Carabalí (COL); L 0001 – 0102	did not advance		9

Team

Athletes	Event	Round of 16	Quarterfinals	Semifinals	Final	Rank
Athletes	Event	Opposition Result	Opposition Result	Opposition Result	Opposition Result	Rank
Team Chochishvili; Stefania Adelina Dobre (ROU); Fatim Fofana (CIV); Bogdan Iadov (UKR); Louis Krieber-Gagnon (CAN); Liu Xiaoyu (CHN); Yu-Hsuan Lo (TPE); Marton Sarecz (HUN); Estefania Soriano (DOM)	Mixed Team	Team Geesink (MIX); L 3 – 4	did not advance			9

== Taekwondo ==
Ivory Coast was given a wild card to compete.

Boys

Athlete	Event	Round of 16	Quarterfinals	Semifinals	Final	Rank
Athlete	Event	Opposition Result	Opposition Result	Opposition Result	Opposition Result	Rank
Kipre Logbo	−48 kg	S Audibert (FRA); L 6 – 10	did not advance			9

== Wrestling ==
Ivory Coast qualified one athlete based on its performance at the 2014 African Cadet Championships.

Key:

- VT - Victory by Fall.
- PP - Decision by Points - the loser with technical points.
- PO - Decision by Points - the loser without technical points.

Girls

Athlete	Event	Group stage				Final / RM	Rank
Athlete	Event	Opposition Score	Opposition Score	Opposition Score	Rank	Opposition Score	Rank
Amy Youin	Freestyle -70kg	C Park (KOR); L 0 – 4	T Kilic (TUR); L 1 – 3	I Keju (MHL); L 1 – 3	4 Q	M Duisenova (KAZ); L 1 – 3	8
