= 2014 Summer Youth Olympics =

Multi-sport event in Nanjing, China

II Summer Youth Olympic Games
- Location: Nanjing, China
- Motto: Share the Games, Share our dreams (Chinese: 分享青春, 共筑未来; pinyin: Fēnxiǎng qīngchūn, gòng zhù wèilái; lit. 'Share our youth', 'build our future together')
- Nations: 203
- Athletes: 3,579
- Events: 222 in 28 sports
- Opening: 16 August
- Closing: 28 August
- Opened by: President Xi Jinping
- Closed by: IOC president Thomas Bach
- Cauldron: Chen Ruolin
- Stadium: Nanjing Olympic Sports Centre

The 2014 Summer Youth Olympics (Chinese: 2014年夏季青年奧林匹克运动会; pinyin: Èr líng yī sì Nián Xiàjì Qīngnián Àolínpǐkè Yùndònghuì), officially known as the II Summer Youth Olympic Games Chinese: 第二届夏季青年奧林匹克运动会; pinyin: Dì'èrjiè Xiàjì Qīngnián Àolínpǐkè Yùndònghuì, and commonly known as Nanjing 2014 (Chinese: 南京2014; pinyin: Nánjīng Èr Líng yī sì), were the second Summer Youth Olympic Games, an international sports, education and cultural festival for teenagers, held from 16 to 28 August 2014 in Nanjing, China. These were the first Youth Olympic Games held in China, making it the first country to host both regular and Youth Olympics following the 2008 Summer Olympics in Beijing and the first Youth Olympic Games under the IOC presidency of Thomas Bach.

== Bidding process ==
The International Olympic Committee established the Youth Olympic Games in July 2007. The 2014 host city was elected on 10 February 2010, during the 2010 IOC Session in Vancouver. This was the first election of a Youth Olympic Games host city held in an IOC Session. The elections for the host cities of the 2010 Summer Youth Olympics and 2012 Winter Youth Olympics were done through postal votes by IOC members.

2014 Summer Youth Olympics bidding results
City	Nation	Votes
Nanjing	China	47
Poznań	Poland	42

- April 2009 – NOCs to inform the IOC of the name of a YOG Candidate City. (This was changed from February 2009 after several NOCs asked for more preparation time)
- September 2009 – Submission of the YOG Candidature File, YOG Guarantees File, photographic files and Undertaking
- December 2009 – Short-list of YOG Candidate Cities by the IOC Executive Board
- February 2010 – Election and announcement of the Host City of the 2nd Summer Youth Olympic Games at the 122nd IOC Session in Vancouver (before the 2010 Winter Olympics)

== Development and preparations ==
=== Venues and infrastructure ===
All of the venues are located in four zones within Nanjing. All venues with the exception of the cycling road, sailing, and triathlon venues, were temporary.

The Nanjing Olympic Sports Center hosted the opening and closing ceremonies.

District	Venue	Image	Sports	Capacity
Gulou	Longjiang Gymnasium		Judo, Wrestling	
Gulou	Wutaishan Sports Center		Basketball, Football, Table tennis	
Jiangning	Fangshan Sports Training Base		Archery, Shooting	
Jiangning	Jiangning Sports Center		Football, Handball	
Jiangning	Jinniu Lake Sailing Venue		Sailing	
Jianye	Nanjing International Expo Center		Boxing, Fencing, Modern Pentathlon, Taekwondo, Weightlifting	
Jianye	Nanjing Olympic Sports Center		Aquatics, Athletics, Ceremonies, Gymnastics, Modern Pentathlon	60,000
Pukou	Laoshan National Forest Park		Cycling	
Pukou	Youth Olympic Sports Park		Beach Volleyball, Cycling, Field Hockey, Rugby Sevens	
Xuanwu	Nanjing Sport Institute		Badminton, Tennis	
Xuanwu	Xinzhuang Equestrian Venue, generally known as the Nanjing International Exhibition Center		Equestrian	
Xuanwu	Xuanwu Lake Park		Triathlon	
Xuanwu	Xuanwu Lake Rowing-Canoeing Venue		Canoeing, Rowing	
Xuanwu	Zhongshan International Golf Club		Golf	

=== Torch relay ===
The Youth Olympic torch was designed by the Vatti Corporation Ltd. The torch is known as the "Gate of Happiness." A structure resembling a city gate is featured on the top part of the torch, while its blue colour symbolizes the peaceful tranquility of Nanjing. The Yangtze which flows next to Nanjing is presented as stripes found on the handle of the torch. It is said that the torch is capable of resisting wind speeds of 11 m/s, rainfall of 50mm/h, altitude of up to 4500m and a temperature range of -15˚C to 45˚C.

Following Olympic tradition the torch lighting ceremony was held on 30 April 2014 in Athens, Greece at the Panathenaic Stadium where the first Olympic Games were held. Four young athletes from Greece and China made a leg.

The torch relay was divided into two parts. The first part was a digital relay where people who downloaded an app were able to participate in the relay through an interactive option called "Give Me Fire." When using this feature users were able to pass the Youth Olympic flame to their friends by touching their devices together. The relay visited 258 different online locations from the 204 participating NOCs over a 98-day period.

After the digital relay the relay began its physical portion in Nanjing where a 10-day relay was held. 104 torch bearers carried the torch singularly or in pairs over 100 legs. Torch bearers were primarily focused on youth and included individuals from sport, culture, media, volunteers and the International Olympic Committee. Notable torch bearers included two time badminton Olympian gold medalist Lin Dan, 2008 Olympic fencing gold medalist Zhong Man, director Chen Weiya and composer Bian Liunian.

== The Games ==
=== Sports ===
222 events, there will be 13 mixed team events (Mixed-NOCs), 4 mixed team events (NOCs), 1 open event (Equestrian), 109 men's events, and 95 women's events. This is a tentative list of the sports program taken from the general presentation of the 2nd Summer Youth Olympic Games in 2014. Golf and Rugby sevens will be contested for the first time. Beach volleyball will replace indoor volleyball and other format changes to sports like field hockey which introduced a five a side format. New events have also been introduced in some of the sports including a shooting mixed gender event among others.

- Aquatics
  - Diving (4+1)
  - Swimming (34+2)
- Archery (3)
- Athletics (36+1)
- Badminton (2+1)
- Basketball (4)
- Beach volleyball (2)
- Boxing (13)
- Canoeing (8)
- Cycling (2+1)
- Equestrian (1+1)
- Fencing (6+1)
- Field hockey (2)
- Football (2)
- Golf (2+1)
- Gymnastics
  - Artistic gymnastics (12)
  - Rhythmic gymnastics (2)
  - Trampolining (2)
- Handball (2)
- Judo (8+1)
- Modern pentathlon (2+1)
- Rowing (4)
- Rugby sevens (2)
- Sailing (4)
- Shooting (4+2)
- Table tennis (2+1)
- Taekwondo (10)
- Tennis (2+3)
- Triathlon (2+1)
- Weightlifting (11)
- Wrestling (14)

==== Demonstration sports ====
These were the demonstration sports in the games:

- Sport climbing ()
- Inline speed skating ()
- Skateboarding ()
- Wushu ()

=== Calendar ===
All dates are BJT (UTC+8)

222 events are expected to be held over the 2014 Youth Olympics. The schedule will be finalized as the event becomes closer.

●	Opening ceremony	●	Event competitions	●	Event finals	●	Closing ceremony

August	14th Thu	15th Fri	16th Sat	17th Sun	18th Mon	19th Tue	20th Wed	21st Thu	22nd Fri	23rd Sat	24th Sun	25th Mon	26th Tue	27th Wed	28th Thu	Events
Ceremonies			●												●	
Aquatics (Diving)										1	1	1	1	1		5
Aquatics (Swimming)				3	8	5	7	4	9							36
Archery									●	●	1	1	1			3
Athletics							●	●	●	13	12	11	1			37
Badminton				●	●	●	●	●	3							3
Basketball					●	●	●	2	●	●	●	●	2			4
Beach volleyball				●	●	●		●	●		●	●	1	1		2
Boxing										●	●	●	3	10		13
Canoeing										●	4		●	4		8
Cycling				●	●	●	●		2		1					3
Equestrian						●	1	●	●	●	1					2
Fencing				2	2	2	1									7
Field hockey				●	●	●	●	●		●	●	●	1	1		2
Football	●	●		●	●		●	●		●	●	●	1	1		2
Golf						●	●	2			●	●	1			3
Gymnastics				●	●	1	1	1	1	5	5		●	2		16
Handball							●	●	●		●	2				2
Judo				3	3	2		1								9
Modern pentathlon									●	1	1		1			3
Rowing				●	●	●	4									4
Rugby sevens				●	●	●	2									2
Sailing					●	●	●		●	4						4
Shooting				1	1	1	1	1	1							6
Table tennis				●	●	●	2	●	●	1						3
Taekwondo				2	2	2	2	2								10
Tennis				●	●	●	●	●	●	2	3					5
Triathlon				1	1			1								3
Weightlifting				2	2	2		2	2	1						11
Wrestling												5	4	5		14
Total gold medals				14	19	15	21	16	18	28	29	20	17	25		222
Cumulative gold medals				14	33	48	69	85	103	131	160	180	197	222		222
August	14th Thu	15th Fri	16th Sat	17th Sun	18th Mon	19th Tue	20th Wed	21st Thu	22nd Fri	23rd Sat	24th Sun	25th Mon	26th Tue	27th Wed	28th Thu	Events

=== Participating National Olympic Committees ===
203 out of the 204 National Olympic Committees recognized at that time sent delegates to Nanjing. Among them, both Sierra Leone and Nigeria were planning to participate, but on 13 August 2014 both nations pulled out due to pressure from Chinese Authorities in an attempt to prevent Ebola from West Africa from entering their nation. On 15 August 2014 Liberia also withdrew along with two athletes from Guinea being barred by the International Olympic Committee (IOC) due to fears that the nature of their sports (judo and swimming) could pose a risk to other athletes. An athlete from South Sudan competed under the Olympic flag as they did not have a National Olympic Committee. The ten nations with the most athletes are China (with 123), Brazil (with 97), United States (with 92), Australia (with 89), Russia (with 88), Germany (with 85), Egypt (with 83), France (with 82), Japan (with 78), and Mexico (with 78).

Participating National Olympic Committees
- Afghanistan (1)
- Albania (5)
- Algeria (33)
- American Samoa (5)
- Andorra (10)
- Angola (15)
- Antigua and Barbuda (5)
- Argentina (60)
- Armenia (14)
- Aruba (4)
- Australia (89)
- Austria (33)
- Azerbaijan (21)
- Bahamas (14)
- Bahrain (5)
- Bangladesh (13)
- Barbados (8)
- Belarus (35)
- Belgium (33)
- Belize (3)
- Benin (5)
- Bermuda (7)
- Bhutan (2)
- Bolivia (7)
- Bosnia and Herzegovina (6)
- Botswana (8)
- Brazil (97)
- British Virgin Islands (8)
- Brunei (3)
- Bulgaria (27)
- Burkina Faso (3)
- Burundi (8)
- Cambodia (3)
- Cameroon (3)
- Canada (72)
- Cape Verde (20)
- Cayman Islands (5)
- Central African Republic (2)
- Chad (2)
- Chile (15)
- China (123) (host)
- Colombia (34)
- Comoros (4)
- Republic of the Congo (8)
- Democratic Republic of the Congo (4)
- Cook Islands (4)
- Costa Rica (3)
- Croatia (24)
- Cuba (12)
- Cyprus (6)
- Czech Republic (37)
- Denmark (15)
- Djibouti (5)
- Dominica (2)
- Dominican Republic (10)
- Ecuador (19)
- Egypt (83)
- El Salvador (8)
- Equatorial Guinea (2)
- Eritrea (3)
- Estonia (17)
- Ethiopia (15)
- Fiji (26)
- Finland (14)
- France (82)
- Gabon (3)
- The Gambia (2)
- Georgia (12)
- Germany (85)
- Ghana (10)
- Great Britain (33)
- Greece (22)
- Grenada (4)
- Guam (8)
- Guatemala (20)
- Guinea (4)
- Guinea-Bissau (2)
- Guyana (4)
- Haiti (3)
- Honduras (21)
- Hong Kong (18)
- Hungary (57)
- Iceland (20)
- India (32)
- Indonesia (27)
- Iran (16)
- Iraq (5)
- Ireland (16)
- Israel (14)
- Italy (68)
- Ivory Coast (4)
- Jamaica (20)
- Japan (78)
- Jordan (6)
- Kazakhstan (51)
- Kenya (24)
- Kiribati (3)
- North Korea (6)
- South Korea (74)
- Kuwait (5)
- Kyrgyzstan (7)
- Laos (2)
- Latvia (13)
- Lebanon (4)
- Lesotho (7)
- Libya (3)
- Liechtenstein (1)
- Lithuania (21)
- Luxembourg (4)
- Macedonia (5)
- Madagascar (3)
- Malawi (5)
- Malaysia (20)
- Maldives (3)
- Mali (4)
- Malta (4)
- Marshall Islands (4)
- Mauritania (3)
- Mauritius (4)
- Mexico (78)
- Federated States of Micronesia (4)
- Moldova (11)
- Monaco (1)
- Mongolia (5)
- Montenegro (5)
- Morocco (15)
- Mozambique (3)
- Myanmar (4)
- Namibia (30)
- Nauru (2)
- Nepal (2)
- Netherlands (41)
- New Zealand (50)
- Nicaragua (4)
- Niger (4)
- Nigeria (12)
- Norway (31)
- Oman (3)
- Pakistan (12)
- Palau (3)
- Palestine (4)
- Panama (8)
- Papua New Guinea (24)
- Paraguay (10)
- Peru (40)
- Philippines (7)
- Poland (59)
- Portugal (21)
- Puerto Rico (23)
- Qatar (21)
- Romania (41)
- Russia (88)
- Rwanda (11)
- Saint Kitts and Nevis (3)
- Saint Lucia (6)
- Saint Vincent and the Grenadines (4)
- Samoa (2)
- San Marino (3)
- São Tomé and Príncipe (4)
- Saudi Arabia (5)
- Senegal (6)
- Serbia (24)
- Seychelles (3)
- Sierra Leone (6)
- Singapore (18)
- Slovakia (38)
- Slovenia (48)
- Somalia (2)
- Solomon Islands (3)
- South Africa (55)
- Spain (66)
- Sri Lanka (9)
- Sudan (5)
- Independent Olympic Athletes (1)
- Suriname (6)
- Swaziland (4)
- Sweden (33)
- Switzerland (19)
- Syria (9)
- Chinese Taipei (47)
- Tajikistan (8)
- Tanzania (4)
- Thailand (37)
- Timor-Leste (2)
- Togo (3)
- Tonga (3)
- Trinidad and Tobago (11)
- Tunisia (50)
- Turkey (41)
- Turkmenistan (3)
- Tuvalu (3)
- Uganda (6)
- Ukraine (58)
- United Arab Emirates (4)
- United States (92)
- Uruguay (22)
- Uzbekistan (28)
- Vanuatu (21)
- Venezuela (59)
- Vietnam (13)
- Virgin Islands (5)
- Yemen (3)
- Zambia (24)
- Zimbabwe (10)

==== Number of athletes by National Olympic Committee ====
IOC Letter Code	Country	Athletes
CHN	China	123
BRA	Brazil	97
USA	United States	92
AUS	Australia	89
RUS	Russia	88
GER	Germany	85
EGY	Egypt	83
FRA	France	82
JPN	Japan	78
MEX	Mexico	78
KOR	South Korea	74
CAN	Canada	72
ITA	Italy	68
ESP	Spain	66
ARG	Argentina	60
POL	Poland	59
VEN	Venezuela	59
UKR	Ukraine	58
HUN	Hungary	57
RSA	South Africa	55
KAZ	Kazakhstan	51
NZL	New Zealand	50
TUN	Tunisia	50
SLO	Slovenia	48
TPE	Chinese Taipei	47
NED	Netherlands	41
ROM	Romania	41
TUR	Turkey	41
PER	Peru	40
SVK	Slovakia	38
CZE	Czech Republic	37
THA	Thailand	37
BLR	Belarus	35
COL	Colombia	34
ALG	Algeria	33
AUT	Austria	33
BEL	Belgium	33
GBR	Great Britain	33
SWE	Sweden	33
IND	India	32
NOR	Norway	31
NAM	Namibia	30
UZB	Uzbekistan	28
BUL	Bulgaria	27
INA	Indonesia	27
FIJ	Fiji	26
CRO	Croatia	24
KEN	Kenya	24
PNG	Papua New Guinea	24
SRB	Serbia	24
ZAM	Zambia	24
PUR	Puerto Rico	23
GRE	Greece	22
URU	Uruguay	22
AZE	Azerbaijan	21
HON	Honduras	21
LTU	Lithuania	21
POR	Portugal	21
QAT	Qatar	21
VAN	Vanuatu	21
CPV	Cape Verde	20
GUA	Guatemala	20
ISL	Iceland	20
JAM	Jamaica	20
MAS	Malaysia	20
ECU	Ecuador	19
SUI	Switzerland	19
HKG	Hong Kong	18
SIN	Singapore	18
EST	Estonia	17
IRI	Iran	16
IRL	Ireland	16
ANG	Angola	15
CHI	Chile	15
DEN	Denmark	15
ETH	Ethiopia	15
MAR	Morocco	15
ARM	Armenia	14
BAH	Bahamas	14
FIN	Finland	14
ISR	Israel	14
BAN	Bangladesh	13
LAT	Latvia	13
VIE	Vietnam	13
CUB	Cuba	12
GEO	Georgia	12
NGR	Nigeria	12
PAK	Pakistan	12
MDA	Moldova	11
RWA	Rwanda	11
TTO	Trinidad and Tobago	11
AND	Andorra	10
DOM	Dominican Republic	10
GHA	Ghana	10
PAR	Paraguay	10
ZIM	Zimbabwe	10
SRI	Sri Lanka	9
SYR	Syria	9
BAR	Barbados	8
BOT	Botswana	8
IVB	British Virgin Islands	8
BDI	Burundi	8
CGO	Republic of the Congo	8
ESA	El Salvador	8
GUM	Guam	8
PAN	Panama	8
TJK	Tajikistan	8
BER	Bermuda	7
BOL	Bolivia	7
KGZ	Kyrgyzstan	7
LES	Lesotho	7
PHI	Philippines	7
BIH	Bosnia and Herzegovina	6
CYP	Cyprus	6
JOR	Jordan	6
PRK	North Korea	6
LCA	Saint Lucia	6
SEN	Senegal	6
SLE	Sierra Leone	6
SUR	Suriname	6
UGA	Uganda	6
ALB	Albania	5
ASA	American Samoa	5
ANT	Antigua and Barbuda	5
BRN	Bahrain	5
BEN	Benin	5
CAY	Cayman Islands	5
DJI	Djibouti	5
IRQ	Iraq	5
KUW	Kuwait	5
MKD	Macedonia	5
MAW	Malawi	5
MGL	Mongolia	5
MNE	Montenegro	5
KSA	Saudi Arabia	5
SUD	Sudan	5
ISV	Virgin Islands	5
ARU	Aruba	4
COM	Comoros	4
COD	Democratic Republic of the Congo	4
COK	Cook Islands	4
GRN	Grenada	4
GUI	Guinea	4
GUY	Guyana	4
CIV	Ivory Coast	4
LIB	Lebanon	4
LUX	Luxembourg	4
MLI	Mali	4
MLT	Malta	4
MHL	Marshall Islands	4
MRI	Mauritius	4
FSM	Federated States of Micronesia	4
MYA	Myanmar	4
NCA	Nicaragua	4
NIG	Niger	4
PLE	Palestine	4
VIN	Saint Vincent and the Grenadines	4
STP	São Tomé and Príncipe	4
SWZ	Swaziland	4
TAN	Tanzania	4
UAE	United Arab Emirates	4
BIZ	Belize	3
BRU	Brunei	3
BUR	Burkina Faso	3
CAM	Cambodia	3
CMR	Cameroon	3
CRC	Costa Rica	3
ERI	Eritrea	3
GAB	Gabon	3
HAI	Haiti	3
KIR	Kiribati	3
LBA	Libya	3
MAD	Madagascar	3
MDV	Maldives	3
MTN	Mauritania	3
MOZ	Mozambique	3
OMA	Oman	3
PLW	Palau	3
SKN	Saint Kitts and Nevis	3
SMR	San Marino	3
SEY	Seychelles	3
SOL	Solomon Islands	3
TOG	Togo	3
TGA	Tonga	3
TKM	Turkmenistan	3
TUV	Tuvalu	3
YEM	Yemen	3
BHU	Bhutan	2
CAF	Central African Republic	2
CHA	Chad	2
DMA	Dominica	2
TLS	Timor-Leste	2
GEQ	Equatorial Guinea	2
GAM	The Gambia	2
GBS	Guinea-Bissau	2
LAO	Laos	2
NRU	Nauru	2
NEP	Nepal	2
SAM	Samoa	2
SOM	Somalia	2
AFG	Afghanistan	1
IOA	Independent Olympic Athletes	1
LIE	Liechtenstein	1
MON	Monaco	1

== Medal table ==
The NYOGOC did not keep an official medal tally. The ranking in this table is based on information provided by the IOC and is consistent with IOC convention in its published medal tables. For the full medal table, refer to the main article.

Medals won by teams with athletes from more than one National Olympic Committee are included in the table as medals awarded to a mixed-NOCs team. There were eight events which composed entirely of mixed-NOCs teams, and as such all 25 medals in these events, including two bronzes in judo, were swept by mixed-NOCs teams. The remaining medals were won in events which combined mixed-NOCs teams and teams representing one NOC. The mixed-NOCs listing is not given a ranking.

Alongside the mixed-NOCs teams, the top ten ranked NOCs are listed below. China (highlighted), as host nation, is also included in the table.

* Host nation (China)

Rank	Nation	Gold	Silver	Bronze	Total
1	China*	38	13	14	65
2	Russia	27	19	11	57
–	Mixed-NOCs	13	12	14	39
3	United States	10	5	7	22
4	France	8	3	9	20
5	Japan	7	9	5	21
6	Ukraine	7	8	8	23
7	Italy	7	8	6	21
8	Hungary	6	6	11	23
9	Brazil	6	6	1	13
10	Azerbaijan	5	6	1	12
11–87	Remaining	90	125	153	368
Totals (87 entries)		224	220	240	684

Source: IOC

== Cultural and education program ==
Youth Olympic Games incorporate a Cultural and Education Program, featuring a variety of cultural and educational activities for young people. Youth Olympics include educational experience based on Olympic values that promote healthy lifestyles and allow young athletes to become well-rounded people with "true sporting spirits." Well-known athletes and "international specialists" guide the young participants. The program combines "Olympic traditions (such as the torch relay) with diverse cultures to spread the Olympic spirit."

=== Athlete role models ===
On 17 March 2014 37 athletes from the 28 Olympic sports were chosen by the IOC to be role models at the 2014 Youth Olympics. The athletes will offer support, mentor and advice to the participating youth Olympians. As an athlete role model they will take part in activities and workshops on healthy lifestyles, social responsibility and Olympism. They will also take part in informal chats known as "chat with champions." On 9 April 2014 and 22 April 2014 footballer Simone Farina and swimmer Patrick Murphy were appointed as the 38th and 39th Athlete Role Model respectively.

Sport	Athlete Role Model	NOC	Olympics Participated
Aquatics (Diving)	Minxia Wu	China	2004, 2008, 2012
Aquatics (Swimming)	Patrick Murphy	Australia	2004, 2008
Archery	Khatuna Lorig	United States	1992, 1996, 2000, 2008, 2012^{[a]}
Athletics	Dwight Phillips	United States	2000, 2004
Athletics	Kajsa Bergqvist	Sweden	1996, 2000
Athletics	Liu Xiang	China	2004, 2008, 2012
Badminton	Nathan Robertson	Great Britain	2000, 2004, 2008
Badminton	Cheng Wen Hsing	Chinese Taipei	2004, 2008, 2012
Basketball	Jorge Garbajosa	Spain	2000, 2004, 2008
Basketball	Anna Arkhipova	Russia	2000, 2004
Boxing	Ren Cancan	China	2012
Canoeing (Sprint)	Lisa Carrington	New Zealand	2012
Cycling (Track)	Frédéric Magné	France	1988, 1992, 1996, 2000
Equestrian (Jumping)	Samantha Lam	Hong Kong	2008
Fencing	Lei Sheng	China	2008, 2012
Fencing	Miles Chamley-Watson	United States	2012
Football	Simone Farina	Italy	
Football	Sun Wen	China	1996, 2000
Golf	Grace Park	South Korea	
Gymnastics (Artistic)	Jani Tanskanen	Finland	
Gymnastics (Artistic)	Elizabeth Tweddle	Great Britain	2004, 2008, 2012
Gymnastics (Rhythmic)	Luboŭ Čarkašyna	Belarus	2012
Gymnastics (Trampoline)	Nuno Merino	Portugal	2004
Handball	Alexandra do Nascimento	Brazil	2004, 2008, 2012
Field hockey	Teun de Nooijer	Netherlands	1996, 2000, 2004, 2008, 2012
Judo	Lucie Décosse	France	2004, 2008, 2012
Modern Pentathlon	Amelie Caze	France	2004, 2008, 2012
Rowing	Erin Cafaro	United States	2008, 2012
Rugby Sevens	Heather Moyse	Canada	2006, 2010, 2014^{[b]}
Sailing	Juan Perdomo	Puerto Rico	
Shooting	Ivana Maksimovic	Serbia	2012
Table Tennis	Jorgen Persson	Sweden	1988, 1992, 1996, 2000, 2004, 2008, 2012
Table Tennis	Wang Liqin	China	2000, 2004, 2008
Taekwondo	Wu Jingyu	China	2008, 2012
Tennis	Paradorn Srichaphan	Thailand	2000, 2004
Triathlon	Emma Snowsill	Australia	2008
Volleyball (Beach)	Zhang Xi	China	2008, 2012
Weightlifting	Kendrick Farris	United States	2008, 2012
Wrestling	Kaori Icho	Japan	2004, 2008, 2012

- ^{a} Khatuna Lorig competed for the Unified Team in 1992 and Georgia in 1996 and 2000.
- ^{b} Heather Moyse competed in Bobsleigh at the 2006, 2010 and 2014 Winter Olympics.

=== Young ambassadors ===
A total of 104 people were selected by their National Olympic Committee to be young ambassadors. Young Ambassadors are aged between 18 and 25 and are athletes, coaches, students or young professionals that demonstrate the Olympic values and inspire and empower young people to do the same.

The main roles of the Young Ambassadors is to promote the Youth Olympics in their nations and to encourage athletes of their nations to get the most out of the Youth Olympic experience by encouraging them to interact with people from different sports and cultures and to take part in activities and workshops.

A seminar has held from 25 to 28 March 2014 in order to prepare the ambassadors for the Youth Olympics by teaching them about the cultures and activities Nanjing has to offer.

NOC	Name	Sports	Notes
Algeria	Abdelmalek Lahoulou	Athletics	
Angola	Andreia Miranda Goncalves	Swimming	
Argentina	Jose Ignacio Fossati Ariznabarreta	Boxing	
Australia	Jessica Fox	Canoeing Slalom	2010 Youth Olympian, 2012 Olympian
Austria	Stefan Janisch	Snowboarding, Tennis	
Azerbaijan	Arzu Məmmədova	Football	
Bahamas	Megan Shepherd		Sports Writer
Bangladesh	Mohammed Farhadur Rahman	Basketball, Cricket, Football	
Barbados	Ryan O'Neal Brathwaite		Cake Baker and Decorator
Belarus	Nastasja Špileŭska	Tennis	NOC Staff
Belgium	Sophie Paris	Ski Mountaineering	NOC Staff
Bosnia and Herzegovina	Edin Branković	Short-Track Speed Skating	
Botswana	Mothusi Ramaabya		Auditing and Advisory
Brazil	Lara Teixeira	Synchronized Swimming	2008, 2012 Olympian
Bulgaria	Damyan Dikov	Basketball	Coach
Cameroon	Prosper Babinne	Football	NOC Volunteer
Canada	Dillon Richardson	Baseball, Basketball	NOC Staff
Chile	Joaquín Ballivián	Athletics	2010 Youth Olympian
China	Lu Ting		NOC Staff
Chinese Taipei	Emily Yeh	Tennis	
Colombia	Juan Sebastian Sanchez Diaz		Orienteering Federation Volunteer
Cook Islands	Tarapiripa Bishop	Football, Netball	
Costa Rica	Gabriel Zumbado	Triathlon	2010 Youth Olympian
Croatia	Danijela Grgić	Athletics	
Cuba	Leydi Laura Moya Lopez	Modern Pentathlon	2010 Youth Olympian
Cyprus	Chrystalleni Trikomiti	Gymnastics Rhythmic	2012 Olympian
Czech Republic	Klara Mejdricka	Volleyball	
Denmark	Ann-Sofie Dalsgaard	Football	NOC Staff
Dominican Republic	Estefania George		NOC Staff
Ecuador	Adriana Lastra Cabezas	Athletics	
Egypt	Mostafa Awadalla	Handball	2010 Youth Olympian
Estonia	Laura-Maria Lehiste	Judo	
Ethiopia	Desalegn Medibaw	Football	
Fiji	Matelita Buadromo	Swimming	2012 Olympian
Finland	Laura Lepisto	Figure Skating	2010 Olympian
France	Thomas Bouhail	Gymnastics Artistic	2008 Olympian
Germany	Marlene Gomez Islinger	Triathlon	2010 Youth Olympian
Great Britain	Max Betteridge	Football	Coach
Greece	Filippos Papageorgiou	Equestrian	
Grenada	Kara Archibald	Swimming	Coach
Guatemala	Gabriela Matus Bonilla	Athletics	
Haiti	Sacha Durocher	Equestrian	Coach
Hong Kong	Hoi Shun Stephanie Au	Swimming	2008, 2012 Olympian
Iceland	Bjarki Benediktsson	Football	Coach
Indonesia	Irham Fadli		NOC Volunteer
Ireland	Leah Ewart	Field Hockey	2010 Youth Olympian
Italy	Elisa Santoni	Gymnastics Rhythmic	2004, 2008, 2012 Olympian
Ivory Coast	Ruth Gbagbi	Taekwondo	2010 Youth Olympian, 2012 Olympian
Jamaica	Kedisha Dallas	Athletics	
Japan	Ran Yagisawa	Dancesport	
Jordan	Shaden Adel Thweib	Martial Arts	
South Korea	Kim Da Hye	Shooting	
Kyrgyzstan	Saltanat Ibraeva		NOC Volunteer
Latvia	Toms Markss		PR Specialist at Latvian Cycling Federation
Lebanon	Tony Tarraf	Volleyball	Director of Lebanese Volleyball Federation
Lithuania	Gintare Okuleviciute	Rowing	
Macedonia	Nina Balaban	Shooting	
Madagascar	Harinelina Rakotondramanana	Fencing	
Malaysia	Benjamin Khor	Shooting	
Mauritius	Henry Fenouillot de Falbaire	Swimming	
Mexico	Andrea Probert Avila	Football, Triathlon	
Moldova	Ana Maria Stratu	Karate	
Mongolia	Tugsbayar Gansukh	Weightlifting	
Morocco	Ahmed Hamza Chraibi	Tennis	President and Founder of Arab Excellence
Namibia	Lurdi Aron	Basketball, Tennis	
Netherlands	Joyce Seesing	Cycling BMX	
New Zealand	Renee Hannah	Water Skiing	
Norway	Torgrim Sommerfeldt	Basketball	
Pakistan	Mahnoor Maqsood	Swimming	
Papua New Guinea	Hannah Ilave	Swimming, Triathlon	
Paraguay	Carlos Caballero Gomez	Squash	
Peru	Aleiandro Quinones	Canoeing	
Philippines	Nadine Gutierrez	Football, Muay-Thai, Swimming	NOC Intern
Poland	Monika Hojnisz	Biathlon	
Portugal	Mariana Catarino	Swimming	
Puerto Rico	Betsmara Cruz	Swimming	Coach
Qatar	Hannah Al-Bader	Handball	
Romania	Emil Imre	Short-Track Speed Skating	
Russia	Olga Ponomar		Sports Journalist
Saint Lucia	Fredric Sweeney	Sailing	Coach
Senegal	Youssouph Ndao	Fencing	
Serbia	Aleksandra Kebic	Handball	NOC Staff
Singapore	Rui Qi Low	Sailing	
Slovakia	Monika Fasungova	Badminton	2012 Olympian
Slovenia	Vanja Mesec	Handball	
South Africa	Reabetewe Mpete	Field Hockey	
Sri Lanka	Ishika de Silva	Rowing	
Sweden	Frida Nevalainen	Ice Hockey	2006, 2010 Olympian
Switzerland	Lisa Gisler	Curling	2012 Youth Olympian
Sudan	Alaa Muntasir	Equestrian	
Tajikistan	Negmatullo Rajabaliyev	Tennis	Coach
Thailand	Apisada Kusolsilp		Sports Authority of Thailand Employee
Trinidad and Tobago	Jeannette Small	Badminton	Coach and NOC Staff
Tunisia	Marwen Chaieb	Rugby	Coach
Turkey	Giray Cavdar	Tennis	Coach
Uganda	Shamim Bangi	Badminton	
Ukraine	Oleksandr Usyk	Boxing	2008, 2012 Olympian
United States	Jessica Luscinski	Football	Coach and NOC Staff
United States Virgin Islands	Jemille Vialet	Swimming	
Uzbekistan	Rashid Burnashev	Athletics	
Vietnam	Van Hao Nguyen	Athletics	
Yemen	Omar Al-Mogahed	Basketball, Football, Table Tennis	UN Yemeni Youth Delegate
Zambia	Samantha Miyanda	Football	
Zimbabwe	Rukudzo Gona	Basketball, Football, Rugby	

== Marketing ==
=== Mascot ===
The Youth Olympic mascot Lele, also known as Nanjing Lele, represents the sound of stones colliding together and is pronounced like the Chinese word meaning happiness or joy.

=== Emblem ===
Like other Olympic events, the 2014 Summer Youth Games has its own emblem. The emblem consists of three parts. The colorful "NANJING" reflects the image of the gate of Nanjing and the features of some Jiangnan houses. The various colors symbolize youths' energetic spirit.

== Controversies ==
=== Isolation of Nigerian athletes in the Games ===
Following the 2014 West Africa Ebola outbreak, Chinese officials quarantined and isolated all Nigerian athletes from all sporting facilities despite all testing negative to Ebola before the games. The Nigerian Olympic committee reacted to the discrimination by withdrawing all its athletes from the games.

=== Doping ===
One unnamed taekwondo athlete had been disqualified from competing at the Youth Olympics after testing positive for the banned diuretic furosemide. The information was released on 5 November 2014.

== See also ==
- Olympic Games celebrated in China
  - 2008 Summer Olympics – Beijing, China
  - 2022 Winter Olympics – Beijing, China

== Notes ==
Preceded by Singapore	Summer Youth Olympic Games; Nanjing; II Youth Olympiad (2014)	Succeeded by Buenos Aires
