= Athletics at the 2014 Summer Youth Olympics =

Athletics at the II Summer Youth Olympic Games
- Venue: Nanjing Olympic Sports Center
- Dates: 20–26 August
- No. of events: 37 (18 boys, 18 girls, 1 mixed)

Athletics at the 2014 Summer Youth Olympics was held from 20 to 26 August at the Nanjing Olympic Sports Center in Nanjing, China.

== Qualification ==
Each National Olympic Committee (NOC) could enter a maximum of 36 athletes, 18 per each gender and 1 per each event. As hosts, China is given 2 quotas, 1 per each gender and 136 places. 68 spots per each gender was decided by the Tripartite Commission. The remaining 540 places were divided evenly among the individual events and were decided among a single continental qualification event for each continent with the exception of the Americas in which they hosted three. The amount of quotas available to each continent for each event was decided on the results from the 2011 World Youth Championships and 2013 World Youth Championships.

To be eligible to participate at the Youth Olympics athletes must have been born between 1 January 1997 and 31 December 1998.

=== Qualification timeline ===
| Event | Location | Date |
|---|---|---|
| 2011 World Youth Championships | (France) Lille Métropole | 6–10 July 2011 |
| 2013 World Youth Championships | (Ukraine) Donetsk | 10–14 July 2013 |
| 2014 Oceania Youth Olympic Qualifying Meet | (Australia) Sydney | 12–16 March 2014 |
| 2014 NACAC non-CARIFTA Youth Olympic Qualifying Meet | (United States) Miramar | 4–5 April 2014 |
| 2014 CARIFTA Games | (Martinique) Fort de France | 19–21 April 2014 |
| 2014 CONSUDATLE Youth Olympic Trials | (Colombia) Cali | 17–18 May 2014 |
| 2014 Asian Youth Olympic Qualifying Meet | (Thailand) Bangkok | 21–22 May 2014 |
| 2014 African Youth Games | (Botswana) Gaborone | 28–31 May 2014 |
| 2014 European Youth Olympic Trials | (Azerbaijan) Baku | 30 May-1 June 2014 |

=== Quota distribution ===
==== Boys ====
| Event | Africa | Americas | Asia | Europe | Oceania | Total |
|---|---|---|---|---|---|---|
| 100m | 1 | 7 | 3 | 2 | 2 | 15 |
| 200m | 1 | 7 | 4 | 2 | 1 | 15 |
| 400m | 2 | 6 | 4 | 2 | 1 | 15 |
| 800m | 9 | 1 | 1 | 3 | 1 | 15 |
| 1500m | 9 | 2 | 1 | 2 | 1 | 15 |
| 3000m | 11 | 1 | 1 | 1 | 1 | 15 |
| 110m Hurdles | 2 | 6 | 4 | 2 | 1 | 15 |
| 400m Hurdles | 2 | 6 | 5 | 1 | 1 | 15 |
| 2000m Steeplechase | 10 | 1 | 2 | 1 | 1 | 15 |
| High Jump | 1 | 4 | 4 | 5 | 1 | 15 |
| Pole Vault | 1 | 3 | 2 | 8 | 1 | 15 |
| Long Jump | 1 | 3 | 4 | 6 | 1 | 15 |
| Triple Jump | 1 | 4 | 2 | 7 | 1 | 15 |
| Shot Put | 1 | 3 | 1 | 9 | 1 | 15 |
| Discus Throw | 2 | 4 | 2 | 6 | 1 | 15 |
| Hammer Throw | 2 | 1 | 1 | 10 | 1 | 15 |
| Javelin Throw | 2 | 1 | 1 | 10 | 1 | 15 |
| 10000m Race Walk | 1 | 4 | 4 | 5 | 1 | 15 |
| Total | 60 | 67 | 42 | 82 | 19 | 270 |

==== Girls ====
| Event | Africa | Americas | Asia | Europe | Oceania | Total |
|---|---|---|---|---|---|---|
| 100m | 1 | 8 | 1 | 4 | 1 | 15 |
| 200m | 1 | 5 | 1 | 7 | 1 | 15 |
| 400m | 1 | 8 | 2 | 3 | 1 | 15 |
| 800m | 3 | 3 | 1 | 7 | 1 | 15 |
| 1500m | 8 | 2 | 1 | 3 | 1 | 15 |
| 3000m | 8 | 1 | 3 | 2 | 1 | 15 |
| 100m Hurdles | 1 | 8 | 1 | 4 | 1 | 15 |
| 400m Hurdles | 2 | 6 | 1 | 5 | 1 | 15 |
| 2000m Steeplechase | 9 | 2 | 1 | 2 | 1 | 15 |
| High Jump | 2 | 2 | 1 | 8 | 2 | 15 |
| Pole Vault | 1 | 2 | 1 | 8 | 3 | 15 |
| Long Jump | 1 | 5 | 1 | 7 | 1 | 15 |
| Triple Jump | 1 | 2 | 2 | 9 | 1 | 15 |
| Shot Put | 1 | 2 | 2 | 9 | 1 | 15 |
| Discus Throw | 1 | 2 | 4 | 5 | 3 | 15 |
| Hammer Throw | 1 | 1 | 1 | 11 | 1 | 15 |
| Javelin Throw | 1 | 4 | 1 | 7 | 2 | 15 |
| 5000m Race Walk | 1 | 1 | 5 | 7 | 1 | 15 |
| Total | 44 | 64 | 30 | 108 | 24 | 270 |

== Schedule ==
The schedule was released by the Nanjing Youth Olympic Games Organizing Committee. In the table below, M stands for morning (begins 09:00), A for afternoon (begins 16:00) and E stands for evening (begins 18:30).

All times are CST (UTC+8)

| Q | Qualifiers | H | Heats | F | Final |

| Date → | Wed 20 | Thu 21 | Fri 22 | Sat 23 | | Sun 24 | | Mon 25 | | Tue 26 | |
| Event ↓ | E | E | E | M | E | M | E | M | E | A | |
|---|---|---|---|---|---|---|---|---|---|---|---|
| Boys' 100 m | | H | | | F | | | | | | |
| Boys' 200 m | | | H | | | | F | | | | |
| Boys' 400 m | H | | | F | | | | | | | |
| Boys' 800 m | | | H | | | | | | F | | |
| Boys' 1500 m | | H | | | | F | | | | | |
| Boys' 3000 m | H | | | | | | F | | | | |
| Boys' 110 m hurdles | H | | | | F | | | | | | |
| Boys' 400 m hurdles | | | H | | | | | F | | | |
| Boys' 2000 m steeplechase | | H | | | | | | | F | | |
| Boys' 10 km walk | | | | | | | F | | | | |
| Boys' Long jump | | Q | | | | F | | | | | |
| Boys' Triple jump | | | Q | | | | | | F | | |
| Boys' High jump | Q | | | | F | | | | | | |
| Boys' Pole vault | | | Q | | | | | | F | | |
| Boys' Shot put | | Q | | | | | F | | | | |
| Boys' Discus throw | Q | | | | F | | | | | | |
| Boys' Javelin throw | | | Q | | | | | | F | | |
| Boys' Hammer throw | | Q | | | | | F | | | | |
| Date → | Wed 20 | Thu 21 | Fri 22 | Sat 23 | | Sun 24 | | Mon 25 | | Tue 26 | |
| Event ↓ | E | E | E | M | E | M | E | M | E | A | |
| Girls' 100 m | | H | | | F | | | | | | |
| Girls' 200 m | | | H | | | F | | | | | |
| Girls' 400 m | H | | | | F | | | | | | |
| Girls' 800 m | H | | | | F | | | | | | |
| Girls' 1500 m | | | H | | | | | F | | | |
| Girls' 3000 m | H | | | | | | F | | | | |
| Girls' 100 m hurdles | H | | | F | | | | | | | |
| Girls' 400 m hurdles | | | H | | | | | | F | | |
| Girls' 2000 m steeplechase | | H | | | | | | | F | | |
| Girls' 5 km walk | | | | | F | | | | | | |
| Girls' Long jump | Q | | | | F | | | | | | |
| Girls' Triple jump | | | Q | | | | | F | | | |
| Girls' High jump | | Q | | | | | F | | | | |
| Girls' Pole vault | Q | | | | F | | | | | | |
| Girls' Shot put | | Q | | | | | F | | | | |
| Girls' Discus throw | Q | | | | F | | | | | | |
| Girls' Javelin throw | | | Q | | | | | | F | | |
| Girls' Hammer throw | | Q | | | | | F | | | | |
| Mixed 8x100 m relay | | | | | | | | | | H | F |

== Medal summary ==
=== Medal table ===
- Nanjing 2014 Final Athletics Results

* Host nation (China)

| Rank | Nation | Gold | Silver | Bronze | Total |
|---|---|---|---|---|---|
| 1 | China* | 6 | 0 | 1 | 7 |
| 2 | Ethiopia | 3 | 3 | 2 | 8 |
| 3 | Ukraine | 3 | 2 | 1 | 6 |
| 4 | Russia | 3 | 2 | 0 | 5 |
| 5 | France | 3 | 1 | 1 | 5 |
| 6 | Jamaica | 3 | 1 | 0 | 4 |
| 7 | Japan | 2 | 2 | 1 | 5 |
| 7 | Kenya | 2 | 2 | 1 | 5 |
| 9 | United States | 2 | 0 | 2 | 4 |
| 10 | Australia | 1 | 2 | 3 | 6 |
| 11 | Mixed-NOCs | 1 | 1 | 1 | 3 |
| 12 | Belarus | 1 | 1 | 0 | 2 |
| 13 | Ghana | 1 | 0 | 0 | 1 |
| 13 | Poland | 1 | 0 | 0 | 1 |
| 13 | South Africa | 1 | 0 | 0 | 1 |
| 13 | Spain | 1 | 0 | 0 | 1 |
| 13 | Suriname | 1 | 0 | 0 | 1 |
| 13 | Switzerland | 1 | 0 | 0 | 1 |
| 13 | Zambia | 1 | 0 | 0 | 1 |
| 20 | Germany | 0 | 4 | 4 | 8 |
| 21 | Italy | 0 | 2 | 1 | 3 |
| 21 | Mexico | 0 | 2 | 1 | 3 |
| 23 | Botswana | 0 | 2 | 0 | 2 |
| 23 | Romania | 0 | 2 | 0 | 2 |
| 25 | Hungary | 0 | 1 | 4 | 5 |
| 26 | Bahrain | 0 | 1 | 1 | 2 |
| 27 | Burundi | 0 | 1 | 0 | 1 |
| 27 | Cyprus | 0 | 1 | 0 | 1 |
| 27 | Slovakia | 0 | 1 | 0 | 1 |
| 27 | Tunisia | 0 | 1 | 0 | 1 |
| 27 | Uganda | 0 | 1 | 0 | 1 |
| 27 | Venezuela | 0 | 1 | 0 | 1 |
| 33 | Azerbaijan | 0 | 0 | 1 | 1 |
| 33 | Bahamas | 0 | 0 | 1 | 1 |
| 33 | Belgium | 0 | 0 | 1 | 1 |
| 33 | Chinese Taipei | 0 | 0 | 1 | 1 |
| 33 | Czech Republic | 0 | 0 | 1 | 1 |
| 33 | Denmark | 0 | 0 | 1 | 1 |
| 33 | Djibouti | 0 | 0 | 1 | 1 |
| 33 | Egypt | 0 | 0 | 1 | 1 |
| 33 | Grenada | 0 | 0 | 1 | 1 |
| 33 | Iraq | 0 | 0 | 1 | 1 |
| 33 | Morocco | 0 | 0 | 1 | 1 |
| 33 | Slovenia | 0 | 0 | 1 | 1 |
| 33 | South Korea | 0 | 0 | 1 | 1 |
| Totals (45 entries) | | 37 | 37 | 37 | 111 |

=== Results ===
==== Boys' events ====
| Games | Gold | | Silver | | Bronze | |
|---|---|---|---|---|---|---|
| 100 m | Sydney Siame; Zambia | 10.56 | Kenta Oshima; Japan | 10.57 | Trae Williams; Australia | 10.60 |
| 200 m | Noah Lyles; United States | 20.80 | Baboloki Thebe; Botswana | 21.20 | Yang Chun-Han; Chinese Taipei | 21.31 |
| 400 m | Martin Manley; Jamaica | 46.31 | Karabo Sibanda; Botswana | 46.76 PB | Henry Delauze; Bahamas | 46.91 PB |
| 800 m | Myles Marshall; United States | 1:49.14 | Geofrey Balimumiti; Uganda | 1:49.37 PB | Bacha Mulata; Ethiopia | 1:49.73 |
| 1500 m | Gilbert Soet; Kenya | 3:41.99 PB | Mulugeta Uma; Ethiopia | 3:45.08 PB | Mohamed Ismail Ibrahim; Djibouti | 3:45.72 PB |
| 3000 m | Yomif Kejelcha; Ethiopia | 7:56.20 | Thierry Ndikumwenayo; Burundi | 8:06.05 PB | Moses Koech; Kenya | 8:06.33 |
| 110 m hurdles | Jaheel Hyde; Jamaica | 12.96 PB | Henrik Hannemann; Germany | 13.40 PB | Kim Gyeongtae; South Korea | 13.43 PB |
| 400 m hurdles | Xu Zhihang; China | 50.61 PB | Mohamed Fares Jlassi; Tunisia | 50.61 PB | Victor Coroller; France | 51.19 PB |
| 2000 m steeplechase | Wogene Sidamo; Ethiopia | 5:38.42 | Amos Kirui; Kenya | 5:40.29 | Hicham Chemlal; Morocco | 5:40.94 |
| 10 km race walk | Minoru Onogawa; Japan | 42:03.64 PB | Vladislav Saraikin; Russia | 42:10.95 PB | Noel Alí Chama; Mexico | 42:14.11 |
| High jump | Danil Lysenko; Russia | 2.20 | Yuji Hiramatsu; Japan | 2.14 PB | Shemaiah James; Australia | 2.14 PB |
| Pole vault | Noel-Aman del Cerro; Spain | 5.10 PB | Vladimir Shcherbakov; Russia | 5.05 | Muntadher Abdulwahid; Iraq | 5.05 PB |
| Long jump | Anatoliy Ryapolov; Russia | 7.54 | Obrien Wasome; Jamaica | 7.44 PB | Zhong Peifeng; China | 7.37 |
| Triple jump | Miguel van Assen; Suriname | 16.15 | Tobia Bocchi; Italy | 16.01 | Nazim Babayev; Azerbaijan | 15.96 |
| Shot put | Konrad Bukowiecki; Poland | 23.17 PB | Andrei Toader; Romania | 21.00 | Merten Howe; Germany | 20.13 |
| Discus throw | Cheng Yulong; China | 64.14 PB | Clemens Prufer; Germany | 63.52 | Ruslan Valitov; Ukraine | 57.48 PB |
| Hammer throw | Hlib Piskunov; Ukraine | 82.65 PB | Bence Halász; Hungary | 81.90 | Ahmed Youssef; Egypt | 78.59 PB |
| Javelin throw | Lukas Moutarde; France | 74.48 PB | Alexandru Novac; Romania | 73.98 | Márk Schmölcz; Hungary | 72.40 |

==== Girls' events ====
| Games | Gold | | Silver | | Bronze | |
|---|---|---|---|---|---|---|
| 100 m | Liang Xiaojing; China | 11.65 | Paraskevi Andreou; Cyprus | 11.71 | Samantha Geddes; Australia | 11.76 |
| 200 m | Natalliah Whyte; Jamaica | 23.55 | Dzhois Koba; Ukraine | 23.94 | Brandee Johnson; United States | 24.28 |
| 400 m | Jessica Thornton; Australia | 52.50 PB | Salwa Naser; Bahrain | 52.74 PB | Meleni Rodney; Grenada | 53.33 PB |
| 800 m | Martha Bissah; Ghana | 2:04.90 PB | Hawi Alemu Negeri; Ethiopia | 2:06.01 PB | Mareen Kalis; Germany | 2:06.03 |
| 1500 m | Kokeb Tesfaye Alemu; Ethiopia | 4:15.38 | Winfred Mbithe; Kenya | 4:17.91 | Dalila Gosa; Bahrain | 4:18.36 PB |
| 3000 m | Nozomi Musembi Takamatsu; Japan | 9:01.58 PB | Alina Reh; Germany | 9:05.07 | Berhan Demiesa Asgedom; Ethiopia | 9:06.10 PB |
| 100 m hurdles | Laura Valette; France | 13.34 PB | Elvira Herman; Belarus | 13.38 | Chloë Beaucarne; Belgium | 13.61 |
| 400 m hurdles | Gezelle Magerman; South Africa | 57.91 PB | Michaela Peskova; Slovakia | 58.26 PB | Anne Sofie Kirkegaard; Denmark | 58.60 PB |
| 2000 m steeplechase | Rosefline Chepngetich; Kenya | 6:22.67 | Zewdenish Teklemaream; Ethiopia | 6:26.02 | Lili Anna Toth; Hungary | 6:31.92 PB |
| 5 km race walk | Ma Zhenxia; China | 22:22.08 SB | Valeria Ortuño; Mexico | 23:19.27 | Noemi Stella; Italy | 23:38.10 |
| High jump | Yuliya Levchenko; Ukraine | 1.89 PB | Nawal Meniker; France | 1.87 PB | Michaela Hruba; Czech Republic | 1.85 |
| Pole vault | Angelica Moser; Switzerland | 4.36 PB | Robeilys Peinado; Venezuela | 4.10 | Leda Kroselj; Slovenia | 3.90 |
| Long jump | Yelyzaveta Baby; Ukraine | 6.26 PB | Beatrice Fiorese; Italy | 6.21 | Rhesa Foster; United States | 6.17 PB |
| Triple jump | Yanis David; France | 13.33 PB | Tay-Leiha Clark; Australia | 13.06 PB | Eszter Bajnok; Hungary | 13.01 PB |
| Shot put | Alena Bugakova; Russia | 18.95 | Maria Orozco Castro; Mexico | 17.55 | Anika Nehls; Germany | 17.31 |
| Discus throw | Sun Kangping; China | 52.79 PB | Al'Ona Byelyakova; Ukraine | 51.64 | Lara Kempka; Germany | 50.70 |
| Hammer throw | Xu Xinying; China | 68.35 PB | Alex Hulley; Australia | 68.35 | Zsofia Matild Bacskay; Hungary | 67.35 |
| Javelin throw | Hanna Tarasiuk; Belarus | 59.52 PB | Fabienne Schonig; Germany | 53.68 | Nagisa Mori; Japan | 52.27 PB |

==== Mixed events ====
| Games | Gold | | Silver | | Bronze | |
|---|---|---|---|---|---|---|
| 8×100 m relay | Team 034; Mixed-NOCs; Merten Howe; Germany; Daou Bacar Aboubacar; Comoros; Trae Williams; Australia; Witthawat Thumcha; Thailand; Maria Simancas; Venezuela; Tatiana Blagoveshchenskaia; Russia; Lakeisha Ashley Warner; British Virgin Islands; Ioana Teodora Gheorghe; Romania | 1:40.20 | Team 038; Mixed-NOCs; Ekaterina Alekseeva; Russia; Oleksandr Malosilov; Ukraine; Rachel Pace; Australia; Mohamed Saad; Bahrain; Chinne Okoronkwo; United States; Amedee Manirakiza; Burundi; Coralie Gassama; France; Sydney Siame; Zambia | 1:41.39 | Team 017; Mixed-NOCs; Sam Geddes; Australia; Michaela Hruba; Czech Republic; Noel-Aman Del Cerro Vilalta; Spain; Martin Nicolas Castanares Mariano; Uruguay; Wogene Sebisibe Sidamo; Ethiopia; Hussain Shahudhaan Fahumee; Maldives; Dhakirina Fatima; Comoros; Salwa Naser; Bahrain | 1:43.60 |

== Participating nations ==
169 nations participated in athletics.

- Albania (2)
- Algeria (12)
- American Samoa (1)
- Angola (1)
- Antigua and Barbuda (2)
- Argentina (3)
- Aruba (1)
- Australia (20)
- Austria (3)
- Azerbaijan (3)
- Bahamas (8)
- Bahrain (5)
- Barbados (5)
- Belarus (7)
- Belgium (4)
- Belize (1)
- Benin (2)
- Bermuda (3)
- Bhutan (1)
- Bolivia (1)
- Bosnia and Herzegovina (1)
- Botswana (5)
- Brazil (17)
- British Virgin Islands (6)
- Brunei (2)
- Bulgaria (1)
- Burkina Faso (2)
- Burundi (5)
- Cambodia (1)
- Cameroon (1)
- Canada (10)
- Cape Verde (1)
- Cayman Islands (2)
- Central African Republic (2)
- Chad (2)
- Chile (2)
- China (9)
- Colombia (11)
- Comoros (3)
- Republic of the Congo (1)
- Democratic Republic of the Congo (2)
- Croatia (1)
- Cyprus (2)
- Czech Republic (6)
- Denmark (3)
- Djibouti (3)
- Dominica (2)
- Dominican Republic (2)
- Ecuador (4)
- Egypt (11)
- Equatorial Guinea (1)
- Eritrea (1)
- Estonia (5)
- Ethiopia (15)
- Federated States of Micronesia (1)
- Fiji (2)
- France (18)
- Gabon (2)
- The Gambia (2)
- Georgia (4)
- Germany (13)
- Ghana (2)
- Greece (6)
- Grenada (2)
- Guinea (2)
- Guinea-Bissau (2)
- Guyana (1)
- Haiti (2)
- Hungary (10)
- India (5)
- Indonesia (1)
- Independent Olympic Athletes (1)
- Iran (3)
- Iraq (2)
- Ireland (5)
- Israel (2)
- Italy (18)
- Ivory Coast (1)
- Jamaica (15)
- Japan (13)
- Kazakhstan (6)
- Kenya (11)
- Kiribati (2)
- South Korea (6)
- Kuwait (2)
- Laos (2)
- Latvia (4)
- Lebanon (1)
- Lesotho (5)
- Liberia (1)
- Libya (1)
- Lithuania (3)
- Luxembourg (1)
- Madagascar (1)
- Malawi (4)
- Maldives (1)
- Mali (2)
- Malaysia (3)
- Marshall Islands (1)
- Mauritania (2)
- Mauritius (1)
- Mexico (7)
- Moldova (2)
- Montenegro (1)
- Morocco (7)
- Mozambique (1)
- Myanmar (1)
- Namibia (1)
- Nauru (1)
- Nepal (1)
- Nicaragua (1)
- Niger (1)
- Nigeria (7)
- Oman (1)
- Palau (1)
- Palestine (2)
- Panama (3)
- Papua New Guinea (1)
- Paraguay (1)
- Peru (5)
- Philippines (1)
- Poland (16)
- Portugal (2)
- Puerto Rico (6)
- Qatar (1)
- Romania (10)
- Russia (9)
- Rwanda (4)
- Saint Kitts and Nevis (2)
- Saint Lucia (2)
- Saint Vincent and the Grenadines (1)
- Samoa (2)
- São Tomé and Príncipe (1)
- Saudi Arabia (2)
- Senegal (1)
- Serbia (2)
- Singapore (1)
- Slovakia (3)
- Slovenia (4)
- Somalia (2)
- Solomon Islands (1)
- South Africa (7)
- Spain (12)
- Sri Lanka (1)
- Sudan (5)
- Suriname (2)
- Switzerland (4)
- Syria (2)
- Chinese Taipei (14)
- Tajikistan (1)
- Tanzania (2)
- Thailand (7)
- Timor-Leste (2)
- Trinidad and Tobago (5)
- Tunisia (6)
- Turkey (9)
- Tuvalu (1)
- Uganda (3)
- Ukraine (14)
- United Arab Emirates (1)
- United States (17)
- Uruguay (1)
- Vanuatu (1)
- Venezuela (8)
- Virgin Islands (1)
- Yemen (1)
- Zambia (4)
- Zimbabwe (3)
