= Swimming at the 2014 Summer Youth Olympics =

Swimming at the II Summer Youth Olympic Games
- Venue: Nanjing Olympic Sports Center
- Dates: 17–22 August

Swimming at the 2014 Summer Youth Olympics was held from 17 to 22 August at the Nanjing Olympic Sports Center in Nanjing, China.

== Qualification ==
Each National Olympic Committee (NOC) can enter a maximum of eight athletes, four per each gender and two per each event. As hosts, China is given the maximum quota and 112 places, 56 per each gender will be decided by the Tripartite Commission. The remaining 280 places, 140 per each gender qualified by achieving the Qualifying Standard Time ("A standard" allows two athletes in an event while the "B standard" allows one athlete in an event) and being among the top 140 eligible athletes in the FINA Points Table. Also only the 16 nations with the most FINA points after the 2013 World Aquatics Championships will be allowed to qualify the maximum quota. All other nations can only qualify four athletes, and two per each gender.

To be eligible to participate at the Youth Olympics, athletes must have been born between 1 January 1996 and 31 December 1999.

=== Qualifying Standard Times ===
Athletes have from 1 April 2013 to 8 June 2014 to achieve the qualification standards. A nation reaching the "A standard" may send up to two athletes in the event and nations reaching the "B standard" may only send one provided that the athlete is in the top 140 in the FINA Points Table.

Event	Boys' Standard		Girls' Standard	
Event	A – 2 Entries	B – 1 Entry	A – 2 Entries	B – 1 Entry
50 m freestyle	23.65	24.48	26.68	27.61
100 m freestyle	51.46	53.26	57.38	59.39
200 m freestyle	1:53.57	1:57.54	2:04.12	2:08.46
400 m freestyle	4:01.68	4:10.14	4:20.23	4:29.34
800 m freestyle	8:22.84	8:40.44	9:02.71	9:21.70
50 m backstroke	27.19	28.14	30.36	31.42
100 m backstroke	57.96	59.99	1:04.66	1:06.92
200 m backstroke	2:07.48	2:11.94	2:19.77	2:24.66
50 m breaststroke	29.81	30.85	33.18	34.34
100 m breaststroke	1:04.79	1:07.06	1:11.99	1:14.51
200 m breaststroke	2:22.24	2:27.22	2:35.17	2:40.60
50 m butterfly	25.47	26.32	28.04	29.02
100 m butterfly	55.43	57.37	1:02.62	1:04.82
200 m butterfly	2:04.10	2:08.44	2:24.75	2:29.82
200 m individual Medley	2:06.57	2:11.00	2:21.48	2:26.43

== Schedule ==
The schedule was released by the Nanjing Youth Olympic Games Organizing Committee. In the table below, M stands for morning (begins 10:00), and E stands for evening (begins 18:00).

All times are CST (UTC+8)

H	Heats	½	Semifinals	F	Final

Date →	Sun 17		Mon 18		Tue 19		Wed 20		Thu 21		Fri 22	
Event ↓	M	E	M	E	M	E	M	E	M	E	M	E
Boys' 50 m freestyle					H	½		F				
Boys' 100 m freestyle									H	½		F
Boys' 200 m freestyle			H	F								
Boys' 400 m freestyle	H	F										
Boys' 800 m freestyle									H	F		
Boys' 50 m backstroke					H	½		F				
Boys' 100 m backstroke	H	½		F								
Boys' 200 m backstroke											H	F
Boys' 50 m breaststroke									H	½		F
Boys' 100 m breaststroke	H	½		F								
Boys' 200 m breaststroke							H	F				
Boys' 50 m butterfly							H	½		F		
Boys' 100 m butterfly			H	½		F						
Boys' 200 m butterfly											H	F
Boys' 200 m individual medley			H	F								
Boys' 4 × 100 m freestyle relay					H	F						
Boys' 4 × 100 m medley relay							H	F				
Date →	Sun 17		Mon 18		Tue 19		Wed 20		Thu 21		Fri 22	
Event ↓	M	E	M	E	M	E	M	E	M	E	M	E
Girls' 50 m freestyle									H	½		F
Girls' 100 m freestyle			H	½		F						
Girls' 200 m freestyle							H	F				
Girls' 400 m freestyle											H	F
Girls' 800 m freestyle					H	F						
Girls' 50 m backstroke							H	½		F		
Girls' 100 m backstroke	H	½		F								
Girls' 200 m backstroke					H	F						
Girls' 50 m breaststroke	H	½		F								
Girls' 100 m breaststroke					H	½		F				
Girls' 200 m breaststroke											H	F
Girls' 50 m butterfly					H	½		F				
Girls' 100 m butterfly									H	½		F
Girls' 200 m butterfly			H	F								
Girls' 200 m individual medley	H	F										
Girls' 4 × 100 m freestyle relay									H	F		
Girls' 4 × 100 m medley relay			H	F								
Mixed 4 × 100 m freestyle relay	H	F										
Mixed 4 × 100 m medley relay											H	F

== Medal summary ==
=== Medal table ===
* Host nation (China)

Rank	Nation	Gold	Silver	Bronze	Total
1	China*	10	5	2	17
2	Russia	6	4	3	13
3	Hungary	4	1	3	8
4	Italy	4	1	2	7
5	United States	3	0	1	4
6	Ukraine	2	1	1	4
7	Lithuania	2	1	0	3
8	Great Britain	1	3	1	5
9	Brazil	1	2	0	3
10	Netherlands	1	1	1	3
11	Croatia	1	0	0	1
11	Egypt	1	0	0	1
11	Japan	1	0	0	1
11	Vietnam	1	0	0	1
15	Germany	0	3	4	7
16	Venezuela	0	2	1	3
17	Hong Kong	0	2	0	2
18	Australia	0	1	9	10
19	Spain	0	1	1	2
19	Trinidad and Tobago	0	1	1	2
21	El Salvador	0	1	0	1
21	Greece	0	1	0	1
21	South Korea	0	1	0	1
21	Switzerland	0	1	0	1
21	Thailand	0	1	0	1
26	New Zealand	0	0	2	2
26	Norway	0	0	2	2
28	Bahamas	0	0	1	1
28	Slovenia	0	0	1	1
Totals (29 entries)		38	34	36	108

=== Events ===
==== Boys' events ====
Games	Gold		Silver		Bronze	
50 m freestyle	Yu Hexin; China	22.00 WJR	Matheus Santana; Brazil	22.43	Dylan Carter; Trinidad and Tobago	22.53
100 m freestyle	Matheus Santana; Brazil	48.25 WJR	Yu Hexin; China	49.06	Damian Wierling; Germany	49.07
200 m freestyle	Nicolangelo Di Fabio; Italy	1:48.45	Kyle Stolk; Netherlands	1:48.59	Damian Wierling; Germany	1:48.91
400 m freestyle	Mykhailo Romanchuk; Ukraine	3:49.76	Marcelo Acosta; El Salvador	3:51.32	Henrik Christiansen; Norway	3:51.55
800 m freestyle	Ahmed Akram; Egypt	7:54.29	Mykhailo Romanchuk; Ukraine	7:56.34	Henrik Christiansen; Norway	7:57.07
50 m backstroke	Evgeny Rylov; Russia	25.09 WJR	Apostolos Christou; Greece	25.44	Simone Sabbioni; Italy	25.47
100 m backstroke	Evgeny Rylov; Russia; Simone Sabbioni; Italy	54.24	Not awarded		Li Guangyuan; China	54.56
200 m backstroke	Li Guangyuan; China	1:56.94 WJR	Evgeny Rylov; Russia	1:57.08	Luke Greenbank; Great Britain	1:59.03
50 m breaststroke	Nikola Obrovac; Croatia	27.83	Carlos Claverie; Venezuela	27.94	Anton Chupkov; Russia	28.43
100 m breaststroke	Anton Chupkov; Russia	1:01.29	Maximilian Pilger; Germany	1:01.51	Carlos Claverie; Venezuela	1:01.56
200 m breaststroke	Ippei Watanabe; Japan	2:11.31	Carlos Claverie; Venezuela	2:11.74	Anton Chupkov; Russia	2:11.87
50 m butterfly	Yu Hexin; China	23.69	Dylan Carter; Trinidad and Tobago	23.81	Mathys Goosen; Netherlands	24.13
100 m butterfly	Li Zhuhao; China	52.94	Aleksandr Sadovnikov; Russia	52.97	Nicholas Brown; Australia	53.18
200 m butterfly	Tamás Kenderesi; Hungary	1:55.95 WJR	Benjámin Grátz; Hungary	1:57.71	Giacomo Carini; Italy	1:58.14
200 m individual medley	Benjámin Grátz; Hungary	2:01.08	Povilas Strazdas; Lithuania	2:02.32	Norbert Szabó; Hungary	2:02.47
4 × 100 m freestyle relay	Great Britain; Duncan Scott (49.67); Miles Munro (49.83); Martyn Walton (50.18); Luke Greenbank (51.51)	3:21.19	Italy; Alessandro Bori (49.85); Giacomo Carini (51.65); Simone Sabbioni (50.97); Nicolangelo Di Fabio (49.82)	3:22.29	Germany; Marek Ulrich (51.52); Maximilian Pilger (51.99); Damian Wierling (49.50); Alexander Kunert (49.92)	3:22.93
4 × 100 m medley relay	Russia; Evgeny Rylov (54.31); Anton Chupkov (1:00.38); Aleksandr Sadovnikov (53.24); Filipp Shopin (50.09)	3:38.02 WJR	Germany; Marek Ulrich (55.51); Maximilian Pilger (1:01.03); Alexander Kunert (54.07); Damian Wierling (48.69)	3:39.30	Australia; Nic Groenewald (55.98); Grayson Bell (1:02.26); Nicholas Brown (53.35); Kyle Chalmers (49.09)	3:40.68

==== Girls' events ====
Games	Gold		Silver		Bronze	
50 m freestyle	Rozaliya Nasretdinova; Russia	24.88 WJR	Ami Matsuo; Australia	25.27	Daria S. Ustinova; Russia	25.56
100 m freestyle	Shen Duo; China	53.84 WJR	Siobhán Haughey; Hong Kong	54.61	Qiu Yuhan; China	54.66
200 m freestyle	Shen Duo; China	1:56.12	Qiu Yuhan; China	1:56.82	Brianna Throssell; Australia	1:58.57
400 m freestyle	Hannah Moore; United States	4:11.05	Sarisa Suwannachet; Thailand	4:11.23	Kathrin Demler; Germany	4:11.25
800 m freestyle	Simona Quadarella; Italy	8:35.39	Jimena Pérez; Spain	8:36.95	Joanna Evans; Bahamas	8:39.75
50 m backstroke	Maaike de Waard; Netherlands	28.36	Jessica Fullalove; Great Britain	28.66	Gabrielle Fa'amausili; New Zealand	28.69
100 m backstroke	Clara Smiddy; United States	1:01.22	Jessica Fullalove; Great Britain	1:01.23	Bobbi Gichard; New Zealand	1:01.25
200 m backstroke	Ambra Esposito; Italy; Hannah Moore; United States	2:10.42	Not awarded		África Zamorano; Spain	2:11.94
50 m breaststroke	Rūta Meilutytė; Lithuania	30.14	Julia Willers; Germany	31.78	Anna Sztankovics; Hungary	31.84
100 m breaststroke	Rūta Meilutytė; Lithuania	1:05.39	He Yun; China	1:07.49	Anastasiya Malyavina; Ukraine	1:08.16
200 m breaststroke	Anastasiya Malyavina; Ukraine	2:26.43	Yang Ji-won; South Korea	2:27.31	Anna Sztankovics; Hungary	2:27.66
50 m butterfly	Rozaliya Nasretdinova; Russia	26.26 WJR	Svenja Stoffel; Switzerland	26.62	Nastja Govejšek; Slovenia	26.70
100 m butterfly	Liliána Szilágyi; Hungary	57.67	Zhang Yufei; China	57.95	Brianna Throssell; Australia	59.12
200 m butterfly	Liliána Szilágyi; Hungary	2:06.59	Zhang Yufei; China	2:08.22	Brianna Throssell; Australia	2:09.65
200 m individual medley	Nguyễn Thị Ánh Viên; Vietnam	2:12.66	Siobhán Haughey; Hong Kong	2:13.21	Meghan Small; United States	2:14.01
4 × 100 m freestyle relay	China; Qiu Yuhan (54.93); He Yun (58.58); Zhang Yufei (54.09); Shen Duo (53.59)	3:41.19	Russia; Rozaliya Nasretdinova (55.65); Daria S. Ustinova (54.85); Irina Prikhodko (56.52); Daria Mullakaeva (55.37)	3:42.39	Australia; Brianna Throssell (55.78); Ella Bond (57.31); Amy Forrester (57.42); Ami Matsuo (53.93)	3:44.44
4 × 100 m medley relay	China; Qiu Yuhan (1:02.26); He Yun (1:08.73); Zhang Yufei (58.56); Shen Duo (54.03)	4:03.58 WJR	Great Britain; Jessica Fullalove (1:01.74); Georgina Evans (1:08.96); Charlotte Atkinson (1:00.13); Amelia Maughan (54.92)	4:05.75	Australia; Amy Forrester (1:02.83); Ella Bond (1:10.16); Brianna Throssell (59.22); Ami Matsuo (54.17)	4:06.38

==== Mixed events ====
Games	Gold		Silver		Bronze	
4 × 100 m freestyle relay	China; Li Guangyuan (50.94); Qiu Yuhan (54.04); Yu Hexin (48.61); Shen Duo (53.43); Li Zhuhao^{[a]} Zhang Yufei^{[a]}	3:27.02 WJR	Brazil; Luiz Altamir Melo (50.90); Natalia de Luccas (57.07); Matheus Santana (47.73); Giovanna Diamante (55.85)	3:31.55	Australia; Kyle Chalmers (50.35); Ami Matsuo (54.35); Brianna Throssell (55.60); Nicholas Brown (51.46); Nic Groenewald^{[a]}	3:31.76
4 × 100 m medley relay	China; Li Guangyuan (54.81); He Yun (1:07.54); Zhang Yufei (58.28); Yu Hexin (48.70); Qiu Yuhan^{[a]} Zhang Zhihao^{[a]} Li Zhuhao^{[a]} Shen Duo^{[a]}	3:49.33	Russia; Irina Prikhodko (1:02.39); Anton Chupkov (1:00.86); Aleksandr Sadovnikov (52.69); Daria S. Ustinova (54.92)	3:50.86	Australia; Amy Forrester (1:02.11); Grayson Bell (1:02.52); Nicholas Brown (53.32); Ami Matsuo (54.50); Brianna Throssell^{[a]} Kyle Chalmers^{[a]}	3:52.45

^{a} Swimmers who participated in the heats only and received medals.

== Participating nations ==
145 nations participated in swimming.

- Albania (1)
- Algeria (1)
- Andorra (1)
- Antigua and Barbuda (2)
- Argentina (3)
- Armenia (1)
- Aruba (2)
- Australia (8)
- Austria (4)
- Azerbaijan (1)
- Bahamas (3)
- Bangladesh (1)
- Barbados (3)
- Belarus (4)
- Belgium (4)
- Benin (2)
- Bermuda (1)
- Bolivia (2)
- Bosnia and Herzegovina (2)
- Botswana (1)
- Brazil (8)
- British Virgin Islands (1)
- Bulgaria (2)
- Burkina Faso (1)
- Cambodia (1)
- Cameroon (1)
- Canada (7)
- Chile (1)
- China (8)
- Colombia (1)
- Comoros (1)
- Democratic Republic of the Congo (1)
- Cook Islands (1)
- Costa Rica (1)
- Croatia (3)
- Cuba (3)
- Cyprus (2)
- Czech Republic (4)
- Djibouti (1)
- Dominican Republic (2)
- Egypt (4)
- El Salvador (3)
- Estonia (3)
- Federated States of Micronesia (2)
- Fiji (1)
- Finland (4)
- France (8)
- Georgia (1)
- Germany (8)
- Ghana (2)
- Great Britain (8)
- Greece (4)
- Grenada (2)
- Guatemala (1)
- Guinea (1)
- Guyana (2)
- Honduras (2)
- Hong Kong (4)
- Hungary (8)
- Iceland (2)
- India (2)
- Indonesia (4)
- Iran (1)
- Ireland (3)
- Israel (4)
- Italy (8)
- Jamaica (2)
- Japan (8)
- Jordan (2)
- Kazakhstan (3)
- South Korea (4)
- Kuwait (1)
- Latvia (2)
- Lebanon (1)
- Liberia (1)
- Liechtenstein (1)
- Lithuania (4)
- Luxembourg (2)
- Macedonia (1)
- Madagascar (1)
- Malawi (1)
- Maldives (2)
- Mali (1)
- Malta (2)
- Malaysia (4)
- Marshall Islands (1)
- Mauritius (1)
- Mexico (4)
- Moldova (3)
- Mozambique (2)
- Namibia (3)
- Netherlands (7)
- New Zealand (4)
- Nicaragua (1)
- Norway (4)
- Pakistan (1)
- Palau (1)
- Palestine (2)
- Panama (3)
- Papua New Guinea (2)
- Paraguay (1)
- Peru (2)
- Philippines (1)
- Poland (4)
- Portugal (4)
- Puerto Rico (1)
- Qatar (1)
- Romania (4)
- Russia (8)
- Rwanda (1)
- Saint Lucia (1)
- Saint Vincent and the Grenadines (1)
- San Marino (2)
- Serbia (4)
- Seychelles (1)
- Sierra Leone (1)
- Singapore (4)
- Slovakia (3)
- Slovenia (4)
- South Africa (8)
- Spain (8)
- Sri Lanka (2)
- Suriname (2)
- Swaziland (1)
- Sweden (6)
- Switzerland (4)
- Syria (2)
- Chinese Taipei (4)
- Tajikistan (1)
- Tanzania (2)
- Thailand (4)
- Tonga (1)
- Trinidad and Tobago (3)
- Tunisia (2)
- Turkey (4)
- Turkmenistan (1)
- Ukraine (4)
- United Arab Emirates (1)
- United States (8)
- Uruguay (1)
- Uzbekistan (2)
- Venezuela (4)
- Vietnam (4)
- Zambia (1)
- Zimbabwe (2)
