= Athletics at the 2014 Summer Youth Olympics – Mixed 8 × 100 metres relay =

Athletics – Mixed 8x100 metres relay at the II Summer Youth Olympic Games
- Venue: Nanjing Olympic Sports Centre
- Date: August 26
- Competitors: 536

Medalists
1st place, gold medalist(s)		Team 034	Mixed-NOCs
2nd place, silver medalist(s)		Team 038	Mixed-NOCs
3rd place, bronze medalist(s)		Team 017	Mixed-NOCs

The Mixed 8x100m relay competition at the 2014 Youth Olympic Games was held on 26 August 2014 in Nanjing Olympic Sports Center. The competitors were divided in 67 teams composed of mixed athletes from different NOCs, gender and disciplines aiming to be balanced in strength. In the preparation phase there are ten athletes (five men and five women) in competition phases there are 8 athletes (four men and four women).

Each team was composed of:

- Three athletes from Group A events (100m, 200m, 400m, 100/110m hurdles, 400m hurdles)
- Two athletes from Group B (800m, 1500m, 3000m, 2000m steeplechase, Race Walk)
- One athlete from Group C (High Jump, Pole Vault, Long Jump and Triple Jump)
- One athlete from Group D (Shot Put, Discus Throw, Hammer Throw and Javelin Throw)
- Three athletes at random from all remaining athletes

== Schedule ==
Date	Time	Round
26 August 2014	16:00	Heats
26 August 2014	18:30	Final

== Results ==
=== Heats ===
Only the first 9 teams by time progress to the Final.

Rank	Heat	Lane	Team	Result	Q
1	5	4	Team 038	1:41.40	Q
2	4	8	Team 034	1:41.79	Q
3	6	2	Team 044	1:43.06	Q
4	6	4	Team 046	1:43.29	Q
5	2	1	Team 010	1:43.45	Q
5	6	8	Team 050	1:43.45	Q
7	7	3	Team 053	1:43.54	Q
8	2	8	Team 017	1:43.96	Q
9	1	7	Team 007	1:44.10	Q
10	6	1	Team 043	1:44.25	
11	7	4	Team 054	1:44.44	
12	5	3	Team 037	1:44.47	
13	1	5	Team 005	1:44.55	
14	1	8	Team 008	1:44.93	
15	1	6	Team 006	1:44.96	
16	6	7	Team 049	1:45.41	
17	7	5	Team 055	1:45.62	
18	2	5	Team 014	1:45.83	
19	7	2	Team 052	1:45.94	
20	8	4	Team 062	1:45.97	
21	6	6	Team 048	1:45.98	
22	6	5	Team 047	1:46.29	
23	2	7	Team 016	1:46.58	
24	6	3	Team 045	1:46.82	
25	5	2	Team 036	1:46.86	
26	8	2	Team 060	1:47.02	
27	5	8	Team 042	1:47.11	
28	5	5	Team 039	1:47.12	
28	1	2	Team 002	1:47.12	
30	2	4	Team 013	1:47.24	
31	2	6	Team 015	1:47.36	
32	8	7	Team 065	1:47.43	
33	3	3	Team 021	1:47.85	
34	1	9	Team 009	1:47.98	
35	2	3	Team 012	1:48.24	
36	1	1	Team 001	1:48.32	
37	7	1	Team 051	1:49.18	
38	4	1	Team 027	1:49.25	
39	8	1	Team 059	1:49.47	
40	7	6	Team 056	1:49.58	
41	4	7	Team 033	1:49.79	
42	4	4	Team 030	1:50.24	
43	3	8	Team 026	1:52.13	
44	8	3	Team 061	1:52.31	
45	3	2	Team 020	1:52.45	
46	2	2	Team 011	1:52.48	
47	7	7	Team 057	1:52.60	
48	7	8	Team 058	1:53.22	
49	3	1	Team 019	1:53.23	
50	5	7	Team 041	1:53.49	
51	1	3	Team 003	1:53.62	
52	3	5	Team 023	1:53.66	
53	4	5	Team 031	1:53.83	
54	5	6	Team 040	1:54.12	
55	3	6	Team 024	1:54.17	
56	4	3	Team 029	1:54.37	
57	8	6	Team 064	1:54.36	
58	3	4	Team 022	1:54.39	
59	4	6	Team 032	1:55.40	
60	3	7	Team 025	1:55.48	
61	2	9	Team 018	1:57.32	
62	8	8	Team 066	1:57.34	
63	8	5	Team 063	1:58.85	
64	8	9	Team 067	2:02.78	
65	1	4	Team 004	2:04.73	
	4	2	Team 028	DNF	
	5	1	Team 035	DSQ	

=== Final ===
Rank	Lane	Team	Result
1st place, gold medalist(s)	5	Team 034; Merten Howe (GER); Daou Aboubacar (COM); Trae Williams (AUS); Witthawat Thumcha (THA); María Simancas (VEN); Tatyana Blagoveshchenskaya (RUS); Lakeisha Warner (IVB); Ioana Gheorghe (ROU)	1:40.20
2nd place, silver medalist(s)	4	Team 038; Ekaterina Alekseeva (RUS); Oleksandr Malosilov (UKR); Rachel Pace (AUS); Mohamed Saad (BRN); Chinne Okoronkwo (USA); Amedee Manirakiza (BDI); Coralie Gassama (FRA); Sydney Siame (ZAM)	1:41.39
3rd place, bronze medalist(s)	3	Team 017; Sam Geddes (AUS); Michaela Hrubá (CZE); Noel Del Cerro (ESP); Martín Castañares (URU); Wogene Sidamo (ETH); Hussain Fahumee (MDV); Dhakirina Fatima (COM); Salwa Naser (BRN)	1:43.60
4	2	Team 007; Tristan Slater (CAN); Fabienne Schönig (GER); Benediktas Mickus (LTU); Mirna Marques da Silva (BRA); Yuliya Levchenko (UKR); Bence Halász (HUN); Hanin Thabit (YEM); Jaheel Hyde (JAM)	1:44.77
5	1	Team 053; Tavonte Mott (BAH); Faheemah Scraders (BER); Jo-Ane van Dyk (RSA); Riham Abohiba (EGY); Noemi Sempere (ESP); Stefano Sottile (ITA); Dicki Terry Mael (VAN); Bacha Mulata (ETH)	1:45.02
6	9	Team 010; Xu Zhihang (CHN); Mazoon Al Alawi (OMA); Cecilia Tamayo (MEX); Alex Rousseau-Jamard (FRA); Bader Alamrani (KSA); Lea Navarro (FRA); Cheikh Beya (MTN); Yana Kachur (UKR)	1:46.17
7	8	Team 050; Dzhois Koba (UKR); Esraa Happa (EGY); Mareen Kalis (GER); Adam Mohamed (SUD); Magali Roche (CAN); Nanthavath Khentanone (LAO); Gemechu Lama (ETH); Jason Yaw (GUY)	1:52.88
8	6	Team 044; Hussein Al-Bayati (IRQ); Steffi Murillo (PER); Emma Fitzgerald (USA); Goga Maglakelidze (GEO); Salome Lang (SUI); Lotte Scheldeman (BEL); Mohd Rizzua Muhammad (MAS); Kim Gyeong-Tae (KOR)	1:52.99
9	7	Team 046; Juan José Garrancho (ESP); Djafar Swedi (COD); Brittni Wolczyk (CAN); Wen Wan-Ju (TPE); Soukaina Belil (MAR); Tjaša Stanko (SLO); Clemens Prüfer (GER); Jeffrey Uzzell (USA)	1:54.59
