= Athletics at the 2014 Summer Youth Olympics – Girls' 1500 metres =

Athletics – Girls' 1500 metres at the II Summer Youth Olympic Games
- Venue: Nanjing Olympic Sports Centre
- Date: August 22–25
- Competitors: 20 from 20 nations

Medalists
1st place, gold medalist(s)		Kokeb Tesfaye Alemu	Ethiopia
2nd place, silver medalist(s)		Winfred Mbithe	Kenya
3rd place, bronze medalist(s)		Dalila Gosa	Bahrain

The girls’ 1500 m competition at the 2014 Summer Youth Olympics was held on 22–25 August 2014 in Nanjing Olympic Sports Center.

== Schedule ==
Date	Time	Round
22 August 2014	19:40	Heats
25 August 2014	10:15	Final

== Results ==
=== Heats ===
First 50% athletes in Qualification round will progress to the A Final, and the remaining athletes to the B Final.

Rank	Heat	Lane	Athlete	Result	Notes	Q
1	2	5	Kokeb Tesfaye Alemu (ETH)	4:21.87		FA
2	1	5	Konstanze Klosterhalfen (GER)	4:22.00		FA
3	2	9	Winfred Mbithe (KEN)	4:22.57		FA
4	1	9	Dalila Gosa (BRN)	4:23.14		FA
5	2	3	Chiara Ferdani (ITA)	4:25.93	PB	FA
6	1	7	Mary Joy Mudyiravanji (ZIM)	4:28.53	PB	FA
7	2	2	Venantie Mukandayisenga (RWA)	4:28.67	PB	FA
8	1	4	Hala Hamdi (TUN)	4:28.97	SB	FA
9	2	8	Emily Augustine (AUS)	4:29.21		FA
10	1	10	Francine Niyomwungere (BDI)	4:29.27	PB	FA
11	1	2	Sylwia Indeka (POL)	4:30.80		FB
12	2	6	Micaela Levaggi (ARG)	4:32.77		FB
13	1	3	Gabriela Doroftei (ROU)	4:35.82		FB
14	2	1	Dorcas Boniface Ilanda (TAN)	4:36.15	PB	FB
15	1	6	Margy Rivera (COL)	4:39.54		FB
16	2	4	Abir Reffas (ALG)	4:41.17		FB
17	1	1	Fatma El Sharnouby (EGY)	4:59.87		FB
18	2	10	Nelia Martins (TLS)	5:15.04	PB	FB
19	1	8	Suha Zawahra (PLE)	5:44.58		FB
	2	7	Saadia Fadili (MAR)	DNF		FB

=== Finals ===
==== Final A ====
Rank	Final Placing	Lane	Athlete	Result	Notes
1st place, gold medalist(s)	1	4	Kokeb Tesfaye Alemu (ETH)	4:15.38	
2nd place, silver medalist(s)	2	1	Winfred Mbithe (KEN)	4:17.91	
3rd place, bronze medalist(s)	3	10	Dalila Gosa (BRN)	4:18.36	PB
4	4	5	Konstanze Klosterhalfen (GER)	4:21.02	
5	5	8	Hala Hamdi (TUN)	4:27.77	SB
6	6	7	Mary Joy Mudyiravanji (ZIM)	4:28.92	
7	7	6	Venantie Mukandayisenga (RWA)	4:29.23	
8	8	9	Emily Augustine (AUS)	4:30.51	
9	9	2	Francine Niyomwungere (BDI)	4:30.54	
10	10	3	Chiara Ferdani (ITA)	4:39.88	

==== Final B ====
Rank	Final Placing	Lane	Athlete	Result	Notes
1	11	9	Sylwia Indeka (POL)	4:36.33	
2	12	2	Dorcas Boniface Ilanda (TAN)	4:36.35	
3	13	6	Micaela Levaggi (ARG)	4:36.72	
4	14	5	Abir Reffas (ALG)	4:36.88	
5	15	1	Margy Rivera (COL)	4:37.36	
6	16	3	Gabriela Doroftei (ROU)	4:40.63	
7	17	8	Nelia Martins (TLS)	5:11.61	PB
8	18	10	Fatma El Sharnouby (EGY)	5:35.32	
		4	Saadia Fadili (MAR)	DNS	
		7	Suha Zawahra (PLE)	DNS	
