= Sugira (surname) =

Sugira is a surname. Notable people with the surname include:

- Ernest Sugira (born 1991), Rwandan footballer
- James Sugira (born 1997), Rwandan runner
