= Ethiopia at the 2014 Summer Youth Olympics =

- IOC code: ETH
- NOC: Ethiopian Olympic Committee

in Nanjing
- Competitors: 15 in 1 sport
- Medals Ranked 16th: Gold 3 Silver 3 Bronze 2 Total 8

Summer Youth Olympics appearances
- 2010; 2014; 2018

Ethiopia competed at the 2014 Summer Youth Olympics, in Nanjing, China from 16 August to 28 August 2014.

== Medalists ==
Medals awarded to participants of mixed-NOC (Combined) teams are represented in italics. These medals are not counted towards the individual NOC medal tally.

Medal	Name	Sport	Event	Date
Gold	Yomif Kejelcha	Athletics	Boys' 3000 m	24 August
Gold	Wogene Sidamo	Athletics	Boys' 2000 m steeplechase	25 August
Gold	Kokeb Alemu	Athletics	Girls' 1500 m	25 August
Silver	Hawi Negeri	Athletics	Girls' 800 m	23 August
Silver	Mulugeta Uma	Athletics	Boys' 1500 m	24 August
Silver	Zewdinesh Teklemaream	Athletics	Girls' 2000 m steeplechase	25 August
Silver	Beza Zegeye	Athletics	Mixed 8x100m Relay	26 August
Bronze	Berhan Asgedom	Athletics	Girls' 3000 m	24 August
Bronze	Bacha Mulata	Athletics	Boys' 800 m	25 August
Bronze	Wogene Sidamo	Athletics	Mixed 8x100m Relay	26 August

== Athletics ==
Ethiopia qualified 15 athletes.

Qualification Legend: Q=Final A (medal); qB=Final B (non-medal); qC=Final C (non-medal); qD=Final D (non-medal); qE=Final E (non-medal)

Boys
Track & road events

Athlete	Event	Heats		Final	
Athlete	Event	Result	Rank	Result	Rank
Gemechu Lama	400 m	47.42 PB	3 Q	47.66	6
Bacha Mulata	800 m	1:51.18	7 Q	1:49.73	3rd place, bronze medalist(s)
Mulugeta Uma	1500 m	3:52.26	9 Q	3:45.08 PB	2nd place, silver medalist(s)
Yomif Kejelcha	3000 m	8:05.85	1 Q	7:56.20	1st place, gold medalist(s)
Henok Amare	110 m hurdles	14.36	19 qC	14.21 PB	16
Wogene Sidamo	2000 m steeplechase	5:34.24 PB	1 Q	5:38.42	1st place, gold medalist(s)
Gemechu Birtu	10 km walk	—		48:54.97	11

Field Events

Athlete	Event	Qualification		Final	
Athlete	Event	Distance	Rank	Distance	Rank
Ubang Mulata	Javelin throw	69.47 PB	10 qB	68.68	11

Girls
Track & road events

Athlete	Event	Heats		Final	
Athlete	Event	Result	Rank	Result	Rank
Genet Dobamo	400 m				
Hawi Negeri	800 m	2:08.18	3 qA	2:06.01 PB	2nd place, silver medalist(s)
Kokeb Alemu	1500 m	4:21.87 qA	1	4:15.38	1st place, gold medalist(s)
Berhan Asgedom	3000 m	9:07.05 PB	2 qA	9:06.10 PB	3rd place, bronze medalist(s)
Zewdinesh Teklemaream	2000 m steeplechase	6:37.65	2 qA	6:26.02	2nd place, silver medalist(s)
Beza Zegeye	5 km walk	—		26:21.58	14

Field events

Athlete	Event	Qualification		Final	
Athlete	Event	Distance	Position	Distance	Position
Nyebolo Aga	Triple jump	12.01	14 qB	11.96	14
