= Athletics at the 2014 Summer Youth Olympics – Boys' 1500 metres =

Athletics – Boys' 1500 metres at the II Summer Youth Olympic Games
- Venue: Nanjing Olympic Sports Centre
- Date: August 21–24
- Competitors: 18 from 18 nations

Medalists
1st place, gold medalist(s)		Gilbert Soet	Kenya
2nd place, silver medalist(s)		Mulugeta Uma	Ethiopia
3rd place, bronze medalist(s)		Mohamed Ismail Ibrahim	Djibouti

The boys’ 1500 m competition at the 2014 Summer Youth Olympics was held on 21–24 August 2014 in Nanjing Olympic Sports Center.

== Schedule ==
Date	Time	Round
21 August 2014	19:40	Heats
24 August 2014	10:20	Final

== Results ==
=== Heats ===
First 50% athletes in Qualification round will progress to the A Final, and the remaining athletes to the B Final.

Rank	Heat	Lane	Athlete	Result	Notes	Q
1	2	6	Gilbert Kwemoi Soet (KEN)	3:45.21	PB	FA
2	2	2	Mohamed Ismail Ibrahim (DJI)	3:47.06	PB	FA
3	2	4	James Sugira (RWA)	3:47.28	PB	FA
4	2	1	Baptiste Mischler (FRA)	3:47.38	PB	FA
5	2	3	Adam Abdelwahab (SUD)	3:49.45	PB	FA
6	2	5	Rodrigue Biziyaremye (BDI)	3:49.79		FA
7	1	4	Ajay Kumar Saroj (IND)	3:51.71	PB	FA
8	1	8	Mostafa Smaili (MAR)	3:51.90		FA
9	1	2	Mulugeta Assefa (ETH)	3:52.26		FA
10	1	6	John Joseph Churi (TAN)	3:52.32	PB	FB
11	1	7	Ömer Oti (TUR)	3:52.36		FB
12	1	3	Braydon Rennie (CAN)	3:53.02		FB
13	1	9	Abina Tchinga (MAW)	3:54.35	PB	FB
14	2	7	Steven Mande (UGA)	3:54.88	PB	FB
15	1	1	Mateusz Borkowski (POL)	3:55.78		FB
16	2	9	Stefan Cukovic (BIH)	3:55.85	PB	FB
17	1	5	Sufyan Hamdan (PLE)	4:09.24	PB	FB
18	2	8	Daou Aboubacar (COM)	4:16.36		FB

=== Finals ===
==== Final A ====
Rank	Final Placing	Lane	Athlete	Result	Notes
1st place, gold medalist(s)	1	9	Gilbert Kwemoi Soet (KEN)	3:41.99	PB
2nd place, silver medalist(s)	2	6	Mulugeta Assefa (ETH)	3:45.08	PB
3rd place, bronze medalist(s)	3	8	Mohamed Ismail Ibrahim (DJI)	3:45.72	PB
4	4	1	Mostafa Smaili (MAR)	3:46.28	PB
5	5	7	Ajay Kumar Saroj (IND)	3:46.92	PB
6	6	5	Baptiste Mischler (FRA)	3:47.22	PB
7	7	4	Rodrigue Biziyaremye (BDI)	3:48.20	PB
8	8	3	James Sugira (RWA)	3:48.93	
9	9	2	Adam Abdelwahab (SUD)	3:51.61	

==== Final B ====
Rank	Final Placing	Lane	Athlete	Result	Notes
1	10	1	Ömer Oti (TUR)	3:53.46	
2	11	2	Braydon Rennie (CAN)	3:53.64	
3	12	8	John Joseph Churi (TAN)	3:53.88	
4	13	9	Mateusz Borkowski (POL)	3:55.58	
5	14	3	Abina Tchinga (MAW)	3:56.56	
6	15	6	Steven Mande (UGA)	3:59.12	
7	16	7	Stefan Cukovic (BIH)	4:01.93	
8	17	4	Daou Aboubacar (COM)	4:19.74	
		5	Sufyan Hamdan (PLE)	DNS	
