= Swimming at the 2014 Summer Youth Olympics – Boys' 50 metre freestyle =

Boys' 50 metre freestyle at the 2014 Summer Youth Olympics
- Venue: Nanjing Olympic Sports Centre
- Dates: 19 August (heats, semifinals); 20 August (final)
- Competitors: 52 from 51 nations
- Winning time: 22.00

Medalists
gold medal	Yu Hexin	China
silver medal	Matheus Santana	Brazil
bronze medal	Dylan Carter	Trinidad and Tobago

The boys' 50 metre freestyle swimming event at the 2014 Summer Youth Olympics took place on 19 and 20 August at the Nanjing Olympic Sports Centre in Nanjing, China.

== Results ==
=== Heats ===
The heats were held at 10:25.

Rank	Heat	Lane	Name	Nationality	Time	Notes
1	7	4	Matheus Santana	Brazil	22.55	Q
2	6	3	Dylan Carter	Trinidad and Tobago	22.65	Q
3	3	4	Yu Hexin	China	22.79	Q
4	7	6	Alessandro Bori	Italy	22.93	Q
5	5	4	Jan Hołub	Poland	22.98	Q
6	7	3	Miles Munro	Great Britain	22.99	Q
7	5	7	Duncan Scott	Great Britain	23.08	Q
8	6	8	Chad Idensohn	Zimbabwe	23.12	Q
9	7	5	Fotios Mylonas	Greece	23.14	Q
10	6	4	Damian Wierling	Germany	23.19	Q
11	6	6	Jānis Šaltāns	Latvia	23.22	Q
12	6	2	Isak Eliasson	Sweden	23.37	Q
13	6	5	Kyle Chalmers	Australia	23.38	Q
14	6	7	Tomáš Púchly	Slovakia	23.42	Q
15	4	4	Javier Acevedo	Canada	23.49	Q
16	5	6	Robert Glință	Romania	23.56	Q
17	7	8	Calum Bain	Ireland	23.57	
18	7	1	Vahan Mkhitaryan	Armenia	23.62	
19	5	1	Guido Buscaglia	Argentina	23.69	
20	5	5	Darren Lim	Singapore	23.71	
21	4	6	Meli Malani	Fiji	23.76	
22	4	2	Alexis Borisavljevic	Belgium	23.81	
23	5	2	Manuel González	Panama	23.86	
24	6	1	Zuhayr Pigot	Suriname	23.99	
25	4	3	Raoul Stafrace	Malta	24.02	
26	4	7	Vedad Ramic	Bosnia and Herzegovina	24.06	
27	7	2	Juan Marín	Spain	24.12	
28	7	7	Lim Ching Hwang	Malaysia	24.26	
29	4	1	Sidrell Williams	Jamaica	24.40	
30	4	5	Oumar Toure	Mali	24.61	
30	4	8	José Alberto Quintanilla	Bolivia	24.61	
32	3	6	Adam Viktora	Seychelles	24.82	
33	3	8	Shakil Fakir	Mozambique	24.85	
34	3	5	Md Asif Reza	Bangladesh	24.98	
35	3	3	Kerry Ollivierre	Grenada	25.40	
36	3	1	Davide Bernardi	San Marino	25.53	
37	3	7	Collin Akara	Papua New Guinea	25.61	
38	3	2	Kwaku Addo	Ghana	25.66	
39	2	5	Gabriel Richter	Swaziland	26.15	
40	1	3	Ammaar Ghadiyali	Tanzania	26.16	
41	2	4	Anas Altamari	Palestine	26.36	
42	1	6	Troy Kojenlang	Marshall Islands	26.39	
43	2	3	Mohamed Adnan	Maldives	27.03	
44	5	3	Temaruata Strickland	Cook Islands	27.54	
45	2	6	Sopha Cheng	Cambodia	27.58	
46	2	2	Derek Dainard	Federated States of Micronesia	29.55	
47	1	2	Ibroihim Djoumoi	Comoros	29.57	
48	2	1	Rayane Alognisso	Benin	31.31	
49	1	5	Jonathan Mubikayi	Democratic Republic of the Congo	31.69	
50	1	4	Fabrice Guedia Zeutsop	Cameroon	32.17	
51	2	8	Ahmed Alwan	Djibouti	32.65	
	2	7	Abdoul Babu	Rwanda	DSQ	

=== Semifinals ===
The semifinals were held at 18:20.

Rank	Heat	Lane	Name	Nationality	Time	Notes
1	2	5	Yu Hexin	China	22.01	Q, WJR
2	2	4	Matheus Santana	Brazil	22.48	Q
3	1	4	Dylan Carter	Trinidad and Tobago	22.49	Q
4	2	3	Jan Hołub	Poland	22.74	Q
5	2	6	Duncan Scott	Great Britain	22.78	Q
6	1	2	Damian Wierling	Germany	22.80	Q
6	1	3	Miles Munro	Great Britain	22.80	Q
8	1	5	Alessandro Bori	Italy	22.87	Q
9	2	2	Fotios Mylonas	Greece	23.07	
10	2	7	Jānis Šaltāns	Latvia	23.14	
11	2	1	Kyle Chalmers	Australia	23.16	
12	2	8	Javier Acevedo	Canada	23.19	
13	1	8	Robert Glință	Romania	23.26	
14	1	6	Chad Idensohn	Zimbabwe	23.37	
15	1	7	Isak Eliasson	Sweden	23.40	
16	1	1	Tomáš Púchly	Slovakia	23.43	

=== Final ===
The final was held at 18:00.

Rank	Lane	Name	Nationality	Time	Notes
1st place, gold medalist(s)	4	Yu Hexin	China	22.00	WJR
2nd place, silver medalist(s)	5	Matheus Santana	Brazil	22.43	
3rd place, bronze medalist(s)	3	Dylan Carter	Trinidad and Tobago	22.53	
4	8	Alessandro Bori	Italy	22.66	
5	6	Jan Hołub	Poland	22.70	
6	1	Miles Munro	Great Britain	22.82	
6	7	Damian Wierling	Germany	22.82	
8	2	Duncan Scott	Great Britain	22.84	
