= Australia at the 2014 Summer Youth Olympics =

- IOC code: AUS
- NOC: Australian Olympic Committee
- Website: www.olympics.com.au

in Nanjing
- Competitors: 89 in 23 sports
- Medals Ranked 14th: Gold 4 Silver 3 Bronze 14 Total 21

Summer Youth Olympics appearances
- 2010; 2014; 2018; 2026

Australia competed at the 2014 Summer Youth Olympics, in Nanjing, China from 16 August to 28 August 2014.

== Medalists ==
Medals awarded to participants of mixed-NOC (combined) teams are represented in italics. These medals are not counted towards the individual NOC medal tally.

Medal	Name	Sport	Event	Date
Gold	Brittany Dutton	Triathlon	Girls race	17 August
Gold	Australia girls' national rugby sevens team: Brooke Anderson; Marioulla Belessis; Shenae Ciesiolka; Dominique du Toit; Kellie-Marie Gibson; Raecene McGregor; Caitlin Morgan; Tiana Penitani; Amber Pilley; Mackenzie Sadler; Tayla Stanford; Laura Waldie	Rugby Sevens	Girls' tournament	20 August
Gold	Jessica Thornton	Athletics	Girls' 400 m	23 August
Gold	Trae Williams	Athletics	Mixed 8x100m relay	26 August
Gold	Australia boys' national field hockey team: Matthew Bird; Jonathan Bretherton; Max Hendry; Tom Howard; Max Hughes; Alec Rasmussen; Nathanael Stewart; Mackenzie Warne; Corey Weyer	Field Hockey	Boys' tournament	27 August
Silver	Ami Matsuo	Swimming	Girls' 50 m freestyle	22 August
Silver	Alex Hulley	Athletics	Girls' hammer throw	24 August
Silver	Tay-Leiha Clark	Athletics	Girls' Triple Jump	25 August
Silver	Rachel Pace; Ned Weatherly	Athletics	Mixed 8x100m relay	26 August
Bronze	Nicolas Brown; Kyle Chalmers; Ami Matsuo; Brianna Throssell	Swimming	Mixed 4 × 100 m freestyle relay	17 August
Bronze	Brianna Throssell	Swimming	Girls' 200 m butterfly	18 August
Bronze	Ella Bond; Amy Forrester; Ami Matsuo; Brianna Throssell	Swimming	Girls' 4 × 100 m medley relay	18 August
Bronze	Nicholas Brown	Swimming	Boys' 100 m butterfly	19 August
Bronze	Grayson Bell; Nicholas Brown; Kyle Chalmers; Nic Groenewald	Swimming	Boys' 4 × 100 m medley relay	20 August
Bronze	Brianna Throssell	Swimming	Girls' 200 m freestyle	20 August
Bronze	Naomi de Bruine	Judo	Mixed team	21 August
Bronze	Ella Bond; Amy Forrester; Ami Matsuo; Brianna Throssell	Swimming	Girls' 4 × 100 m freestyle relay	21 August
Bronze	Brittany Dutton; Jack van Stekelenburg	Triathlon	Mixed relay	21 August
Bronze	Brianna Throssell	Swimming	Girls' 100 m butterfly	22 August
Bronze	Grayson Bell; Kyle Chalmers; Amy Forrester; Brianna Throssell	Swimming	Mixed 4 × 100 m medley relay	22 August
Bronze	Sam Geddes	Athletics	Girls' 100 m	23 August
Bronze	Trae Williams	Athletics	Boys' 100 m	23 August
Bronze	Shemaiah James	Athletics	Boys' high jump	23 August
Bronze	Jake Hunter	Equestrian	individual jumping	24 August
Bronze	Sam Geddes	Athletics	Mixed 8x100m relay	26 August
Bronze	Caitlin Parker	Boxing	Girls' -75 kg	26 August

== Archery ==
Australia qualified two archers from its performance at the Oceania Continental Qualification Tournament.

Individual

Athlete	Event	Ranking round		Round of 32	Round of 16	Quarterfinals	Semifinals	Final / BM	Rank
Athlete	Event	Score	Seed	Opposition Score	Opposition Score	Opposition Score	Opposition Score	Opposition Score	Rank
Nicholas Turner	Boys' individual	618	26	Mayr (GER); L 1–7	did not advance				17
Jessica Sutton	Girls' individual	624	20	Laharnar (SLO); L 2–6	did not advance				17

Team

Athletes	Event	Ranking round		Round of 32	Round of 16	Quarterfinals	Semifinals	Final / BM	Rank
Athletes	Event	Score	Seed	Opposition Score	Opposition Score	Opposition Score	Opposition Score	Opposition Score	Rank
Elia Fregnan (ITA); Jessica Sutton (AUS)	Mixed team	1291	5	Kyaw (MYA); Choirunisa (INA); W 5–3	Peters (CAN); Tuokkola (FIN); L 0–6	did not advance			9
Nicholas Turner (AUS); Tzu-Yun Fang (TPE)	Mixed team	1269	27	Han (TPE); Kazanskaya (BLR); L 2–6	did not advance				17

== Athletics ==
Australia qualified 20 athletes.

Qualification Legend: Q=Final A (medal); qB=Final B (non-medal); qC=Final C (non-medal); qD=Final D (non-medal); qE=Final E (non-medal)

Boys
Track & road events

Athlete	Event	Heats		Final	
Athlete	Event	Result	Rank	Result	Rank
Trae Williams	100 m	10.51 PB	1 Q	10.60	3rd place, bronze medalist(s)
Jordan Csabi	200 m	21.70	10 qB	21.87	8
Michael Mullet	400 m	48.24	9 qB	47.87	10
Ryan Patterson	800 m	1:50.68 PB	4 Q	1:50.58	5
Nicholas Andrews	110 m hurdles	13.92	14 qB	DNS	

Field events

Athlete	Event	Qualification		Final	
Athlete	Event	Distance	Rank	Distance	Rank
Joseph Muller	Long jump	DNS		did not advance	
Shemaiah James	High jump	2.07	7 Q	2.14 PB	3rd place, bronze medalist(s)
Declan Carruthers	Pole vault	4.80	10 qB	4.75	10
Matthew Rees	Javelin throw	70.83	8 Q	71.50	4
Ned Weatherly	Hammer throw	75.59 PB	4 Q	74.10	5

Girls
Track & road events

Athlete	Event	Heats		Final	
Athlete	Event	Result	Rank	Result	Rank
Sam Geddes	100 m	11.69 PB	4 Q	11.76	3rd place, bronze medalist(s)
Jessica Thornton	400 m	52.78 PB	1 Q	52.50	1st place, gold medalist(s)
Alina Tape	800 m	2:11.36	12 qB	2:12.57	14
Emily Augustine	1500 m	4:29.21	9 Q	4:30.51	8
Rachel Pace	100 m hurdles	13.83	9 qB	14.07	9
Rosie-May Davidson	2000 m steeplechase	6:58.35	9 Q	6:50.62	8

Field events

Athlete	Event	Qualification		Final	
Athlete	Event	Distance	Position	Distance	Position
Tay-Leiha Clark	Triple jump	13.00 PB	2 Q	13.06 PB	2nd place, silver medalist(s)
Nicole Robinson	High jump	1.74	11 qB	1.73	11
Grace Robinson	Shot put	15.61	6 Q	15.42	7
Alex Hulley	Hammer throw	70.87 PB	1 Q	68.35	2nd place, silver medalist(s)

== Badminton ==
Australia qualified two athletes based on the 2 May 2014 BWF junior world rankings.

singles

Athlete	Event	Group stage				Quarterfinal	Semifinal	Final / BM	Rank
Athlete	Event	Opposition Score	Opposition Score	Opposition Score	Rank	Opposition Score	Opposition Score	Opposition Score	Rank
Daniel Guda	Boys' singles	Lee (HKG); L (12-21, 14–21)	Gnedt (AUT); W (21-14, 20–22, 21–17)	Shishkov (BUL); L (18-21, 19–21)	4	did not advance			25
Joy Lai	Girls' singles	Hartawan (INA); L (13-21, 20–22)	Shivani (IND); L (18-21, 11–21)	Konieczna (POL); W (21-17, 21–4)	3	did not advance			17

doubles

Athlete	Event	Group stage				Quarterfinal	Semifinal	Final / BM	Rank
Athlete	Event	Opposition Score	Opposition Score	Opposition Score	Rank	Opposition Score	Opposition Score	Opposition Score	Rank
Ruselli Hartawan (INA); Daniel Guda (AUS)	Mixed doubles	Mananga Nzoussi (CGO); Blichfeldt (DEN); W (21-10, 21–7)	Penalver (ESP); Cadeau (SEY); W (21-12, 21–19)	Narongrit (THA); Qin (CHN); L (13-21, 19–21)	2	did not advance			9
Joy Lai (AUS); Shi Yuqi (CHN)	Mixed doubles	Seo (KOR); Doha (EGY); W (21-15, 21–10)	Vlaar (NED); Lais (AUT); W (21-16, 21–16)	Coelho (BRA); Lesnaya (UKR); W (21-19, 21–14)	1 Q	Tsuneyama (JPN); LEE (TPE); L (18-21, 9-21)	did not advance		5

== Beach volleyball ==
Australia qualified a girls' team by their performance at the AVC qualification tournament.

Athletes	Event	Preliminary round	Standing	Round of 24	Round of 16	Quarterfinals	Semifinals	Final / BM	Rank
Athletes	Event	Opposition Score	Standing	Opposition Score	Opposition Score	Opposition Score	Opposition Score	Opposition Score	Rank
Phoebe Bell; Britt Kendall	Girls'	Mukantambara – Uwimbabazi (RWA); W 2-0 (21-14, 21–4)	4	Radl – Geßlbauer (AUT); L 0-2 (13-21, 13–21)	did not advance				25
Phoebe Bell; Britt Kendall	Girls'	Verasio – Hiruela (ARG); L 1-2 (21-23, 21–17, 10–15)	4	Radl – Geßlbauer (AUT); L 0-2 (13-21, 13–21)	did not advance				25
Phoebe Bell; Britt Kendall	Girls'	Makroguzova – Rudykh (RUS); L 0-2 (11-21, 9-21)	4	Radl – Geßlbauer (AUT); L 0-2 (13-21, 13–21)	did not advance				25
Phoebe Bell; Britt Kendall	Girls'	Joe – Daniel (VAN); W 2-0 (21-13, 21–6)	4	Radl – Geßlbauer (AUT); L 0-2 (13-21, 13–21)	did not advance				25
Phoebe Bell; Britt Kendall	Girls'	Bernier – Cajigas (PUR); L 1-2 (21-19, 14–21, 11–15)	4	Radl – Geßlbauer (AUT); L 0-2 (13-21, 13–21)	did not advance				25

== Boxing ==
Australia qualified two boxers based on its performance at the 2014 AIBA Youth World Championships

Boys

Athlete	Event	Preliminaries	Semifinals	Final / RM	Rank
Athlete	Event	Opposition Result	Opposition Result	Opposition Result	Rank
Satali Tevi-Fuimaono	-75 kg	Gadzhyiev (UKR); L 0-3	Did not advance	Bout for 5th Place Kallioinen (FIN); W 3-0	5

Girls

Athlete	Event	Preliminaries	Semifinals	Final / RM	Rank
Athlete	Event	Opposition Result	Opposition Result	Opposition Result	Rank
Caitlin Parker	-75 kg	Fabela (USA); W 3-0	Wojcik (POL); L 0-2	Bronze Medal Bout Desmond (IRL); W 3-0	3rd place, bronze medalist(s)

== Canoeing ==
Australia qualified one boat based on its performance at the 2013 World Junior Canoe sprint and slalom Championships.

Boys

Athlete	Event	Qualification		Repechage		Round of 16		Quarterfinals	Semifinals	Final / BM	Rank
Athlete	Event	Time	Rank	Time	Rank	Time	Rank	Opposition Result	Opposition Result	Opposition Result	Rank
Angus Thompson	Boys' K1 slalom	1:12.459	4					Jakub Grigar (SVK); L	did not advance		5
Angus Thompson	Boys' K1 sprint	1:55.274	15	1:54.912	8	1:54.367	16	did not advance			

== Equestrian ==
Australia qualified a rider.

Athlete	horse	Event	Round 1		Round 2			Total		Jump-Off		Rank
Athlete	horse	Event	Penalties	Rank	Penalties	Total	Rank	Penalties	Rank	Penalties	Time	Rank
Jake Hunter	For The Star	individual jumping	0	1	0	0	1	0	4	0		3rd place, bronze medalist(s)
Australasia; Jake Hunter (AUS); Lennard Chiang (HKG); Sarrd Kalantari (IRI); Praveen Mathavan (MAS); Emily Fraser (NZL)	For The Star; DJ; Cristallo; Arkansas; Exilio	Team jumping	12	4	8	20	5	20	5	—N/a		

== Fencing ==
Australia qualified one athlete based on its performance at the 2014 Cadet World Championships.

Boys

Athlete	Event	Pool Round	Seed	Round of 16	Quarterfinals	Semifinals	Final / BM	Rank
Athlete	Event	Opposition Score	Seed	Opposition Score	Opposition Score	Opposition Score	Opposition Score	Rank
Edward Fitzgerald	foil	Marostega (BRA) Roger (FRA) Braun (GER) Haglund (USA); W 5-2; Fileš (CRO)	11		Seo (KOR); L 3-15	did not advance		5

Mixed team

Athletes	Event	Round of 16	Quarterfinals	Semifinals / PM	Final / PM	Rank
Athletes	Event	Opposition Score	Opposition Score	Opposition Score	Opposition Score	Rank
	Mixed team					

== Field hockey ==
Australia qualified a boys' team based on its performance at the Oceania Qualification Tournament.

=== Boys' tournament ===
Roster

- Matthew Bird
- Jonathan Bretherton
- Max Hendry
- Tom Howard
- Max Hughes
- Alec Rasmussen
- Nathanael Stewart
- Mackenzie Warne
- Corey Weyer

Group Stage

Pos	Team	Pld	W	D	L	GF	GA	GD	Pts	Qualification
1	Spain	4	4	0	0	28	10	+18	12	Quarterfinals
2	Australia	4	2	0	2	21	17	+4	6	Quarterfinals
3	Canada	4	2	0	2	14	13	+1	6	Quarterfinals
4	South Africa	4	2	0	2	11	19	−8	6	Quarterfinals
5	Bangladesh	4	0	0	4	7	22	−15	0	

Source: FIH
Rules for classification: 1) points; 2) goal difference; 3) goals scored; 4) head-to-head result.

18 August 2014
16:30

Australia	5–2	Bangladesh
Warne 11', 18', 30', 31'; Rasmussen 21'	Report	Emon 21'; Uddin 26'

Umpires:
Sherif Elamari (EGY)
Sompop Boonsong (THA)

19 August 2014
16:00

South Africa	6–5	Australia
Schooling 24', 34'; Kok 27', 30'; Crowe 27', 29'	Report	Weyer 2', 17'; Rasmussen 4'; Warne 7', 9'

Umpires:
Donovan Simmons (BER)
Epeli Tukuca (FIJ)

20 August 2014
17:30

Spain	7–6	Australia
Fabregas 5'; Castejon 16', 31'; Rosell 19'; Grau 21'; Palet 22'; Alcalde 26'	Report	Stewart 1'; Bird 3'; Weyer 4', 36'; Hendry 13'; Bretherton 29'

Umpires:
Rawi Anbananthan (MAS)
Duvaughn Henlon (JAM)

21 August 2014
16:30

Australia	5–2	Canada
Bird 2'; Stewart 10'; Bretherton 25'; Weyer 29'; Wayne 35'	Report	A. Sidhu 13'; H. Sidhu 36'

Umpires:
Paul Walker (GBR)
Oliver Tarnoczi (AUT)

Quarterfinal

23 August 2014
20:30

Australia	8–1	Mexico
Bird 12', 17'; Weyer 15', 36'; Rasmussen 20', 28', 30'; Warne 26'	Report	Martinez 35'

Umpires:
Donovan Simmons (BER)
Oliver Tarnoczi (AUT)

Semifinal

25 August 2014
19:30

South Africa	3–4	Australia
Crowe 12'; Turner 28'; Schooling 36'	Report	Stewart 18'; Howard 21', 34'; Weyer 31'

Umpires:
Rawi Anbananthan (MAS)
Duvaughn Henlon (JAM)

Gold medal match

27 August 2014
20:30

Canada	3–3	Australia (gold)
Sandhu 19'; A. Sidhu 34', 36'	Report	Rasmussen 3', 32'; Hendry 21'
Penalties
A. Sidhu (penalty shoot-out scored); Panesar (penalty shoot-out scored); Sandhu (penalty shoot-out missed)	2–3	(penalty shoot-out scored) Bird; (penalty shoot-out scored) Rasmussen; (penalty shoot-out scored) Weyer

Umpires:
Paul Walker (GBR)
Aziz Adimah (GHA)

== Golf ==
Australia qualified one team of two athletes based on the 8 June 2014 IGF combined World Amateur Golf Rankings.

Individual

Athlete	Event	Round 1		Round 2			Round 3			Total	
Athlete	Event	Score	Rank	Score	Total	Rank	Score	Total	Rank	Score	Rank
Brett Coletta	Boys	-6	1	Par		9	+2		20	-4	5
Elizabeth Elmassian	Girls	-2	5	+9		28	+9		27	+16	26

Team

Athletes	Event	Round 1 (Foursome)		Round 2 (Fourball)			Round 3 (individual Stroke)				Total	
Athletes	Event	Score	Rank	Score	Total	Rank	Boy	Girl	Total	Rank	Score	Rank
Brett Coletta; Elizabeth Elmassian	Mixed	63 (-9)	3	70 (-2)	133 (-11)	4						

== Gymnastics ==
=== Artistic gymnastics ===
Australia qualified one athlete based on its performance at the 2014 Oceania Artistic gymnastics Championships.

Boys

Athlete	Event	Apparatus						Total	Rank
Athlete	Event	F	PH	R	V	PB	HB	Total	Rank
Clay Stephens	Qualification	11.900	10.500	12.850	14.700	13.050	11.650	74.650	23
Clay Stephens	vault	—N/a						14.166	4

=== Rhythmic gymnastics ===
Australia qualified one athlete based on its performance at the Oceania Qualifying Event.

Individual

Athlete	Event	Qualification						Final					
Athlete	Event	Hoop	Ball	Clubs	Ribbon	Total	Rank	Hoop	Ball	Clubs	Ribbon	Total	Rank
Tara Wilkie	individual	9.300	10.325	9.150	8.500	37.275	18	did not advance					

=== Trampoline ===
Australia qualified one athlete based on its performance at the 2014 Oceania Trampoline Championships.

Athlete	Event	Qualification				Final	
Athlete	Event	Routine 1	Routine 2	Total	Rank	Score	Rank
Abbie Watts	Girls	42.905	48.630	91.535	6 Q	49.170	6

== Judo ==
Australia qualified two athletes based on its performance at the 2013 Cadet World Judo Championships.

Individual

Athlete	Event	Round of 16	Quarterfinals	Semifinals	Rep 1	Rep 2	Rep 3	Final / BM	Rank
Athlete	Event	Opposition Result	Opposition Result	Opposition Result	Opposition Result	Opposition Result	Opposition Result	Opposition Result	Rank
Bryan Jolly	Boys' -55 kg	—N/a	Verstraeten (BEL); L (100-000)	Did not advance	Bye		—N/a	Karaca (TUR); L (010-000)	5
Naomi de Bruine	Girls' -78 kg	Wang (TPE); W (000-000)	Duchene (FRA); L (100-000)	Did not advance	—N/a	Bye	Rodriguez (ESP); L (010-000)	Did not advance	7

Team

Athletes	Event	Round of 16	Quarterfinals	Semifinals	Final	Rank
Athletes	Event	Opposition Result	Opposition Result	Opposition Result	Opposition Result	Rank
Team Nevzorov; Mihanta Andriamifehy (MAD); Brigitte Carabalí (COL); Nicolas Grinda (MON); Bryan Jolly (AUS); Tamazi Kirakozashvili (GEO); Salim Rebahi (ALG); Aleksandra Samardzic (BIH)	Mixed team	Bye	Team Douillet (MIX); L 2 – 5	did not advance		5
Team Xian; Hifumi Abe (JPN); Chiara Carminucci (ITA); Naomi de Brune (AUS); Jolan Florimont (FRA); Brillith Gamarra (PER); Felix Penning (LUX); Marusa Stangar (SLO); Idan Vardi (ISR)	Mixed team	Team Tani (MIX); W 7 – 0	Team Berghmans (MIX); W 4 – 3	Team Rouge (MIX); L 3 – 4	Did not advance	3rd place, bronze medalist(s)

== Modern pentathlon ==
Australia qualified two athletes based on its performance at the Asian and Oceania YOG Qualifiers.

Athlete	Event	Fencing Ranking round (épée one touch)		Swimming (200 m freestyle)			Fencing Final Round (épée one touch)			combined: Shooting/Running (10 m air pistol)/(3000 m)			Total Points	Final Rank
Athlete	Event	Results	Rank	Time	Rank	Points	Results	Rank	Points	Time	Rank	Points	Total Points	Final Rank
Max Esposito	Boys' individual	7-16	20	2:04.84	8	326		21	205	12:11.50	4	569	1100	17
Marina Carrier	Girls' individual	6-17	22	2:26.32	18	262		21	200	15:27.30	21	373	835	23
Juhye Choi (KOR); Max Esposito (AUS)	Mixed relay													
Marina Carrier (AUS); Gergely Regos (HUN)	Mixed relay													

== Rowing ==
Australia qualified two boats based on its performance at the 2013 World Rowing Junior Championships.

Athlete	Event	Heats		Repechage		Semifinals		Final	
Athlete	Event	Time	Rank	Time	Rank	Time	Rank	Time	Rank
Thomas Schramko	Boys' Single Sculls	3:32.46	3 R	3:26.82	1 SA/B	3:27.97	5 FB	3:32.04	2
Miller Ferris; Tyler Ferris	Girls' pairs	3:45.65	5 R	3:46.55	5 FB	—N/a		3:55.80	4

Qualification Legend: FA=Final A (medal); FB=Final B (non-medal); FC=Final C (non-medal); FD=Final D (non-medal); SA/B=Semifinals A/B; SC/D=Semifinals C/D; R=Repechage

== Rugby sevens ==
Australia qualified a girls' team based on its performance at the 2013 Rugby World Cup Sevens.

=== Girls' tournament ===
Roster

- Brooke Anderson
- Marioulla Belessis
- Shenae Ciesiolka
- Dominique du Toit
- Kellie-Marie Gibson
- Raecene McGregor
- Caitlin Morgan
- Tiana Penitani
- Amber Pilley
- Mackenzie Sadler
- Tayla Stanford
- Laura Waldie

Group stage

Pos	Team	Pld	W	D	L	PF	PA	PD	Pts
1	Australia	5	5	0	0	146	17	+129	15
2	China	5	4	0	1	144	32	+112	13
3	Canada	5	3	0	2	108	71	+37	11
4	United States	5	1	1	3	59	98	−39	8
5	Spain	5	1	1	3	44	129	−85	8
6	Tunisia	5	0	0	5	12	166	−154	5

17 August 2014
09:00

Australia	31 - 0	Tunisia

Youth Olympic Sports Park

17 August 2014
16:00

Australia	15 - 12	China

Youth Olympic Sports Park

18 August 2014
09:00

Australia	38 - 0	United States

Youth Olympic Sports Park

18 August 2014
17:00

Australia	39 - 0	Spain

Youth Olympic Sports Park

19 August 2014
10:00

Australia	21 - 5	Canada

Youth Olympic Sports Park

Semifinal

19 August 2014
15:30

Australia	33 - 0	United States

Youth Olympic Sports Park

Gold Medal Match

20 August 2014
09:00

Australia (gold)	38 - 10	Canada

Youth Olympic Sports Park

== Sailing ==
Australia qualified two boats based on its performance at the Byte CII Oceania Continental Qualifiers.

Athlete	Event	Race											Net Points	Final Rank
Athlete	Event	1	2	3	4	5	6	7	8	9	10	M*	Net Points	Final Rank
Tom Cunich	Boys' Byte CII	3	15	24	24	7	13	14	Cancelled			3	79	13
Elyse Ainsworth	Girls' Byte CII	17	11	18	24	26	22	23	Cancelled			27	142	24

== Shooting ==
Australia qualified four shooters based on its performance at the 2013 Oceania Shooting Championships.

Individual

Athlete	Event	Qualification		Final	
Athlete	Event	Points	Rank	Points	Rank
Daniel Clopatofsky Sanchez	Boys' 10m air rifle	594.5	19	did not advance	
Christopher Summerell	Boys' 10m air pistol	561	10	did not advance	
Monika Woodhouse	Girls' 10m air rifle	396.3	20	did not advance	
Elise Downing	Girls' 10m air pistol	359	17	did not advance	

Team

Athletes	Event	Qualification		Round of 16	Quarterfinals	Semifinals	Final / BM	Rank
Athletes	Event	Points	Rank	Opposition Result	Opposition Result	Opposition Result	Opposition Result	Rank
Daniel Clopatofsky Sanchez (AUS); Martina Lindsay Veloso (SGP)	Mixed team 10m air rifle		11 Q	Milovanovic (SRB); Riccardi (SMR); L 8 – 10	Did not advance			17
Monika Woodhouse (AUS); Yang Haoran (CHN)	Mixed team 10m air rifle							
Christopher Summerell (AUS); Christina van Elzelingen (DEN)	Mixed team 10m air pistol	746	8 Q	Teh (SIN)/ Mohamed (EGY); L 5–10	Did not advance			17
Elise Downing (AUS); Aleksandar Todorov (BUL)	Mixed team 10m air pistol		Q	Shafqat (PAK)/ Korostylov (UKR); W	Xiu (SGP)/ Mohamed (EGY); L	Did not advance		5

== Swimming ==
Australia qualified eight swimmers.

Boys

Athlete	Event	Heat		Semifinal		Final	
Athlete	Event	Time	Rank	Time	Rank	Time	Rank
Kyle Chalmers	50 m freestyle	23.38	13 Q	23.16	11	did not advance	
Kyle Chalmers	100 m freestyle	50.73	11 Q	50.92	15	did not advance	
Kyle Chalmers	200 m freestyle	DNS		—N/a		did not advance	
Kyle Chalmers	50 m butterfly	24.90	11 Q	24.70	9	did not advance	
Nic Groenewald	100 m backstroke	56.35	10 Q	55.99	9	did not advance	
Nic Groenewald	200 m backstroke	2:01.82	6 Q	—N/a		2:01.18	7
Nic Groenewald	200 m individual medley	2:05.12	10	—N/a		did not advance	
Grayson Bell	50 m breaststroke	28.96	12 Q	28.86	9	did not advance	
Grayson Bell	100 m breaststroke	1:03.32	10 Q	1:03.13	11	did not advance	
Grayson Bell	200 m breaststroke	2:21.70	20	—N/a		did not advance	
Nicholas Brown	50 m butterfly	25.44	25	did not advance			
Nicholas Brown	100 m butterfly	54.04	4 Q	53.57	4 Q	53.18	3rd place, bronze medalist(s)
Nicholas Brown	200 m butterfly	2:02.28	9	—N/a		did not advance	
Grayson Bell; Nicholas Brown; Kyle Chalmers; Nic Groenewald	4 × 100 m freestyle relay	3:28.25	6 Q	—N/a		3:26.50	5
Grayson Bell; Nicholas Brown; Kyle Chalmers; Nic Groenewald	4 × 100 m medley relay	3:48.09	4 Q	—N/a		3:40.68	3rd place, bronze medalist(s)

Girls

Athlete	Event	Heat		Semifinal		Final	
Athlete	Event	Time	Rank	Time	Rank	Time	Rank
Ami Matsuo	50 m freestyle	25.50	2 Q	25.40	2 Q	25.27	2nd place, silver medalist(s)
Ami Matsuo	100 m freestyle	55.32	3 Q	54.98	2 Q	54.75	4
Ami Matsuo	200 m freestyle	2:01.29	5 Q	—N/a		1:59.63	5
Amy Forrester	50 m backstroke	30.78	32	did not advance			
Amy Forrester	100 m backstroke	1:03.18	13 Q	1:03.12	12	did not advance	
Amy Forrester	200 m backstroke	2:12.85	2 Q	—N/a		2:14.21	6
Ella Bond	50 m freestyle	26.76	20	did not advance			
Ella Bond	50 m breaststroke	32.45	11 Q	32.31	10	did not advance	
Ella Bond	100 m breaststroke	1:12.07	18	did not advance			
Ella Bond	200 m breaststroke	2:35.39	14	—N/a		did not advance	
Ella Bond	200 m individual medley	2:20.28	14	—N/a		did not advance	
Brianna Throssell	200 m freestyle	2:00.60	3 Q	—N/a		1:58.57	3rd place, bronze medalist(s)
Brianna Throssell	50 m butterfly	27.14	7 Q	26.82	3 Q	26.72	4
Brianna Throssell	100 m butterfly	1:00.54	4 Q	59.89	3 Q	59.12	3rd place, bronze medalist(s)
Brianna Throssell	200 m butterfly	2:12.31	5 Q	—N/a		2:09.65	3rd place, bronze medalist(s)
Ella Bond; Amy Forrester; Ami Matsuo; Brianna Throssell	4 × 100 m freestyle relay	3:48.72	2 Q	—N/a		3:44.44	3rd place, bronze medalist(s)
Ella Bond; Amy Forrester; Ami Matsuo; Brianna Throssell	4 × 100 m medley relay	4:11.22	3 Q	—N/a		4:06.38	3rd place, bronze medalist(s)

Mixed

Athlete	Event	Heat		Final	
Athlete	Event	Time	Rank	Time	Rank
Nicholas Brown; Kyle Chalmers; Ami Matsuo; Brianna Throssell	4 × 100 m freestyle relay	3:36.51	6 Q	3:31.76	3rd place, bronze medalist(s)
Grayson Bell; Kyle Chalmers; Amy Forrester; Brianna Throssell	4 × 100 m medley relay	3:55.34	3 Q	3:52.45	3rd place, bronze medalist(s)

== Table Tennis ==
Australia qualified two athletes based on its performance at the Oceania Qualification Event.

singles

Athlete	Event	Group Stage	Rank	Round of 16	Quarterfinals	Semifinals	Final / BM	Rank
Athlete	Event	Opposition Score	Rank	Opposition Score	Opposition Score	Opposition Score	Opposition Score	Rank
Dominic Huang	Boys	Group C Ranefur (SWE); L 0 - 3	4 qB					
Dominic Huang	Boys	Tenti (ARG); L 0 - 3	4 qB					
Dominic Huang	Boys	Calderano (BRA); L 0 - 3	4 qB					
Vy Bui	Girls	Group E Trosman (ISR); L 0 - 3	qB					
Vy Bui	Girls	Saad (EGY)	qB					
Vy Bui	Girls	Chiu (TPE); L 0 - 3	qB					

Team

Athletes	Event	Group Stage	Rank	Round of 16	Quarterfinals	Semifinals	Final / BM	Rank
Athletes	Event	Opposition Score	Rank	Opposition Score	Opposition Score	Opposition Score	Opposition Score	Rank
Australia; Vy Bui (AUS); Dominic Huang (AUS)	Mixed	Group H Czech Republic; Stefcova (CZE); Reitspies (CZE)	qB					
Australia; Vy Bui (AUS); Dominic Huang (AUS)	Mixed	Singapore; Herng (SIN); Jing (SIN); L 0-3	qB					
Australia; Vy Bui (AUS); Dominic Huang (AUS)	Mixed	Europe 1 Diaconu (ROU); Chen (POR); L 0-3	qB					

Qualification Legend: Q=Main Bracket (medal); qB=Consolation Bracket (non-medal)

== Tennis ==
Australia qualified four athletes based on the 9 June 2014 ITF World Junior Rankings.

singles

Athlete	Event	Round of 32	Round of 16	Quarterfinals	Semifinals	Final / BM	Rank
Athlete	Event	Opposition Score	Opposition Score	Opposition Score	Opposition Score	Opposition Score	Rank
Harry Bourchier	Boys' singles	Čonkić (SRB); W 2-1 (5-7, 6–0, 6–3)	Khachanov (RUS); L 0-2 (4-6, 2–6)	did not advance			9-16
Marc Polmans	Boys' singles	Majchrzak (POL); L 0-2 (3-6, 2–6)	did not advance				17-32
Naiktha Bains	Girls' singles	Singh (IND); W 2-0 (6-4, 6–1)	Kalinina (UKR); L 0-2 (2-6, 1–6)	did not advance			9-16
Priscilla Hon	Girls' singles	Schmiedlová (SVK); L 0-2 (3-6, 2–6)	did not advance				17-32

doubles

Athletes	Event	Round of 32	Round of 16	Quarterfinals	Semifinals	Final / BM	Rank
Athletes	Event	Opposition Score	Opposition Score	Opposition Score	Opposition Score	Opposition Score	Rank
Harry Bourchier (AUS); Marc Polmans (AUS)	Boys' doubles	—N/a	Luz (BRA); Zormann (BRA); L 1-2 (4-6, 6–1, [7-10])	did not advance			9-16
Naiktha Bains (AUS); Priscilla Hon (AUS)	Girls' doubles	—N/a	Minnen (BEL); Singh (IND); W 2-0 (6-2, 6–3)	Kenin (USA); Zarazúa (MEX); L 0-2 (6^{3}-7^{7} ,1-6)	did not advance		5-8
Naiktha Bains (AUS); Marc Polmans (AUS)	Mixed doubles	Stollár (HUN); Majchrzak (POL); L 1-2 (6-4, 3–6, [9-11])	did not advance				17-32
Priscilla Hon (AUS); Harry Bourchier (AUS)	Mixed doubles	Teichmann (SUI); Zieliński (POL); L 0-2 (3-6, 4–6)	did not advance				17-32

== Triathlon ==
Australia qualified two athletes based on its performance at the 2014 Oceania Youth Olympic Games Qualifier.

Individual

Athlete	Event	Swim (750m)	Trans 1	Bike (20 km)	Trans 2	Run (5 km)	Total Time	Rank
Jack van Stekelenburg	Boys	0:09:48	0:00:38	0:29:32	0:00:30	0:16:39	0:57:07	14
Brittany Dutton	Girls	0:10:21	0:00:44	0:31:00	0:00:26	0:17:25	0:59:56	1st place, gold medalist(s)

Relay

Athlete	Event	Total times per athlete (swim 250m, bike 6.6 km, run 1.8 km)	Total group time	Rank
Oceania 1 Brittany Dutton (AUS); Jack van Stekelenburg (AUS); Elizabeth Stannard (NZL); Daniel Hoy (NZL)	Mixed relay	0:21:00; 0:19:49; 0:22:32; 0:19:49	01:23:10	3rd place, bronze medalist(s)

== Weightlifting ==
Australia qualified 1 quota in the boys' and girls' events based on the team ranking after the 2014 Weightlifting Oceania Championships.

Boys

Athlete	Event	Snatch		Clean & jerk		Total	Rank
Athlete	Event	Result	Rank	Result	Rank	Total	Rank
Aydan McMahon	−69 kg	100	11	121	11	221	11

Girls

Athlete	Event	Snatch		Clean & jerk		Total	Rank
Athlete	Event	Result	Rank	Result	Rank	Total	Rank
Kiana Elliott	−63 kg	78	7	86	7	164	7

== Wrestling ==
Australia qualified one athlete based on its performance at the 2014 Oceania Cadet Championships.

Key:

- VT - Victory by Fall.
- PP - Decision by Points - the loser with technical points.
- PO - Decision by Points - the loser without technical points.

Boys

Athlete	Event	Group stage				Final / RM	Rank
Athlete	Event	Opposition Score	Opposition Score	Opposition Score	Rank	Opposition Score	Rank
Ben Pratt	Freestyle -100kg	Ceacusta (MDA); L 0-4 ^{ST}	Yakubov (TJK); L 0-4	Rozykulyyev (TKM); L 0-4	4 Q	García (MEX)	
