= Swimming at the 2014 Summer Youth Olympics – Girls' 100 metre butterfly =

Girls' 100 metre butterfly at the 2014 Summer Youth Olympics
- Venue: Nanjing Olympic Sports Centre
- Dates: 21 August (heats, semifinals); 22 August (final)
- Competitors: 30 from 29 nations
- Winning time: 57.67

Medalists
gold medal	Liliána Szilágyi	Hungary
silver medal	Zhang Yufei	China
bronze medal	Brianna Throssell	Australia

The girls' 100 metre butterfly event in swimming at the 2014 Summer Youth Olympics took place on 21–22 August at the Nanjing Olympic Sports Centre in Nanjing, China.

== Results ==
=== Heats ===
The heats were held at 10:23.

Rank	Heat	Lane	Name	Nationality	Time	Notes
1	4	4	Liliána Szilágyi	Hungary	58.91	Q
2	2	4	Zhang Yufei	China	59.13	Q
3	4	3	Claudia Tarzia	Italy	1:00.08	Q
4	3	4	Brianna Throssell	Australia	1:00.54	Q
5	4	6	Elise Olsen	Norway	1:00.63	Q
6	4	5	Charlotte Atkinson	Great Britain	1:00.72	Q
7	3	5	Park Jin-young	South Korea	1:00.80	Q
8	2	3	Svenja Stoffel	Switzerland	1:01.03	Q
9	2	5	Lucie Svěcená	Czech Republic	1:01.11	Q
10	2	2	Jurina Shiga	Japan	1:01.19	Q
11	4	7	Nida Eliz Üstündağ	Turkey	1:01.33	Q
12	2	1	Meghan Small	United States	1:01.39	Q
13	2	6	Danielle Hanus	Canada	1:01.44	Q
14	3	3	Giovanna Diamante	Brazil	1:01.63	Q
15	4	2	Danika Huizinga	Canada	1:01.75	Q
16	4	1	Claudia Hufnagl	Austria	1:02.04	Q
17	3	2	Sara Vanleynseele	Belgium	1:02.24	
18	2	7	Camille Wishaupt	France	1:02.66	
19	3	7	Yap Siew Hui	Malaysia	1:02.96	
20	3	1	Marina Chan	Singapore	1:03.22	
21	3	8	Jannah Sonnenschein	Mozambique	1:03.81	
22	2	8	Mariam Sakr	Egypt	1:04.05	
23	1	4	Elodie Cheong	Mauritius	1:04.42	
24	1	3	Natalia Jaspeado	Mexico	1:04.54	
25	4	8	Dorian Taylor	Dominican Republic	1:04.71	
26	1	5	Robyn Lee	Zimbabwe	1:05.69	
27	3	6	Nastja Govejšek	Slovenia	1:06.08	
28	1	6	Zabrina Holder	Barbados	1:06.16	
29	1	2	Bobbi Gichard	New Zealand	1:06.65	
30	1	7	Dirngulbai Misech	Palau	1:18.33	

=== Semifinals ===
The semifinals were held at 18:11.

Rank	Heat	Lane	Name	Nationality	Time	Notes
1	2	4	Liliána Szilágyi	Hungary	58.50	Q
2	1	4	Zhang Yufei	China	58.78	Q
3	1	5	Brianna Throssell	Australia	59.89	Q
4	2	6	Park Jin-young	South Korea	1:00.02	Q
5	2	5	Claudia Tarzia	Italy	1:00.26	Q
6	1	3	Charlotte Atkinson	Great Britain	1:00.27	Q
7	2	2	Lucie Svěcená	Czech Republic	1:00.33	Q
8	2	3	Elise Olsen	Norway	1:00.41	Q
9	1	6	Svenja Stoffel	Switzerland	1:00.68	
10	2	1	Giovanna Diamante	Brazil	1:00.77	
11	1	2	Jurina Shiga	Japan	1:01.30	
12	2	7	Nida Eliz Üstündağ	Turkey	1:01.31	
13	1	1	Danika Huizinga	Canada	1:01.43	
14	1	7	Meghan Small	United States	1:02.13	
15	1	8	Sara Vanleynseele	Belgium	1:02.39	
16	2	8	Claudia Hufnagl	Austria	1:02.87	

=== Final ===
The final was held at 18:09.

Rank	Lane	Name	Nationality	Time	Notes
1st place, gold medalist(s)	4	Liliána Szilágyi	Hungary	57.67	
2nd place, silver medalist(s)	5	Zhang Yufei	China	57.95	
3rd place, bronze medalist(s)	3	Brianna Throssell	Australia	59.12	
4	2	Claudia Tarzia	Italy	59.38	
5	6	Park Jin-young	South Korea	59.94	
6	1	Lucie Svěcená	Czech Republic	1:00.18	
7	8	Elise Olsen	Norway	1:00.23	
8	7	Charlotte Atkinson	Great Britain	1:00.61	
