= Bahrain at the 2014 Summer Youth Olympics =

- IOC code: BRN
- NOC: Bahrain Olympic Committee

in Nanjing
- Competitors: 5 in 1 sport
- Medals Ranked 64th: Gold 0 Silver 1 Bronze 1 Total 2

Summer Youth Olympics appearances
- 2010; 2014; 2018

Bahrain competed at the 2014 Summer Youth Olympics, in Nanjing, China from 16 August to 28 August 2014.

== Medalists ==
Medals awarded to participants of mixed-NOC (Combined) teams are represented in italics. These medals are not counted towards the individual NOC medal tally.

| Medal | Name | Sport | Event | Date |
|---|---|---|---|---|
| Silver | Salwa Naser | Athletics | Girls' 400 m | 23 August |
| Silver | Mohamed Alobad | Athletics | Mixed 8x100m Relay | 26 August |
| Bronze | Dalila Gosa | Athletics | Girls' 1500 m | 25 August |
| Bronze | Salwa Naser | Athletics | Mixed 8x100m Relay | 26 August |

== Athletics ==
Bahrain qualified five athletes.

Qualification Legend: Q=Final A (medal); qB=Final B (non-medal); qC=Final C (non-medal); qD=Final D (non-medal); qE=Final E (non-medal)

Boys
Track & road events

| Athlete | Event | Heats | | Final | |
| Athlete | Event | Result | Rank | Result | Rank |
|---|---|---|---|---|---|
| Mohamed Saad | 100 m | 11.29 | 20 qC | 11.27 | 19 |
| Abdi Ibrahim Aboo | 3000 m | 8:16.86 PB | 7 Q | 8:08.91 PB | 4 |

Girls
Track & road events

| Athlete | Event | Heats | | Final | |
| Athlete | Event | Result | Rank | Result | Rank |
|---|---|---|---|---|---|
| Salwa Naser | 400 m | 53.95 | 2 Q | 52.74 | 2nd place, silver medalist(s) |
| Dalila Gosa | 1500 m | 4:24.14 | 4 Q | 4:18.36 | 3rd place, bronze medalist(s) |
| Fatuma Chebsi | 3000 m | 9:06.87 | 1 Q | 9:12.66 | 4 |
