= Timor-Leste at the 2014 Summer Youth Olympics =

- IOC code: TLS
- NOC: National Olympic Committee of East Timor

in Nanjing
- Competitors: 2 in 1 sport
- Medals: Gold 0 Silver 0 Bronze 0 Total 0

Summer Youth Olympics appearances
- 2010; 2014; 2018

East Timor competed at the 2014 Summer Youth Olympics, in Nanjing, China from 16 August to 28 August 2014.

== Athletics ==
East Timor qualified two athletes.

Qualification Legend: Q=Final A (medal); qB=Final B (non-medal); qC=Final C (non-medal); qD=Final D (non-medal); qE=Final E (non-medal)

Boys
Track & road events

Athlete	Event	Heats		Final	
Athlete	Event	Result	Rank	Result	Rank
Domingos Savio dos Santos	800 m	2:03.88	19 qC	2:02.58	17

Girls
Track & road events

Athlete	Event	Heats		Final	
Athlete	Event	Result	Rank	Result	Rank
Nelia Martins	1500 m	5:15.04	18 qB	5:11.61	17
