= Oumar Toure (swimmer) =

Malian swimmer

Personal information
- Born: January 24, 1996 (age 30)

Sport
- Sport: Swimming
- Strokes: Butterfly

Oumar Toure (born 24 January 1996) is a Malian swimmer. He competed at the 2016 Summer Olympics in the men's 100 metre butterfly event; his time of 57.56 seconds in the heats did not qualify him for the semifinals.

In 2014, he represented Mali at the 2014 Summer Youth Olympics held in Nanjing, China and he competed in the boys' 50 metre butterfly and boys' 50 metre freestyle events.
