= Burundi at the 2014 Summer Youth Olympics =

- IOC code: BDI
- NOC: Comité National Olympique du Burundi

in Nanjing
- Competitors: 8 in 3 sports
- Medals Ranked 70th: Gold 0 Silver 1 Bronze 0 Total 1

Summer Youth Olympics appearances
- 2010; 2014; 2018

Burundi competed at the 2014 Summer Youth Olympics, in Nanjing, China from 16 August to 28 August 2014.

== Medalists ==
Medals awarded to participants of mixed-NOC (Combined) teams are represented in italics. These medals are not counted towards the individual NOC medal tally.

Medal	Name	Sport	Event	Date
Silver	Thierry Ndikumwenayo	Athletics	Boys' 3000 m	24 August
Silver	Amedee Manirakiza	Athletics	Mixed 8x100m Relay	26 August

== Athletics ==
Burundi qualified five athletes.

Qualification Legend: Q=Final A (medal); qB=Final B (non-medal); qC=Final C (non-medal); qD=Final D (non-medal); qE=Final E (non-medal)

Boys
Track & road events

Athlete	Event	Heats		Final	
Athlete	Event	Result	Rank	Result	Rank
Rodrigue Biziyaremye	1500 m	3:49.79	6 Q	3:48.20 PB	7
Thierry Ndikumwenayo	3000 m	8:16.11 PB	5 Q	8:06.05 PB	2nd place, silver medalist(s)
Amedee Manirakiza	2000 m steeplechase	5:45.54	7 Q	5:47.52	4

Girls
Track & road events

Athlete	Event	Heats		Final	
Athlete	Event	Result	Rank	Result	Rank
Francine Niyomwungere	1500 m	4:29.27	10 Q	4:30.54	9
Cavaline Nahimana	3000 m	9:07.23	3 Q	9:14.45	5

== Beach Volleyball ==
Burundi qualified a boys' team by their performance at the CAVB Qualification Tournament.

Athletes	Event	Preliminary round	Standing	Round of 24	Round of 16	Quarterfinals	Semifinals	Final / BM	Rank
Athletes	Event	Opposition Score	Standing	Opposition Score	Opposition Score	Opposition Score	Opposition Score	Opposition Score	Rank
Bosco Ndayishimye; Fiston Niyongabo	Boys'	Stoyanovskiy/Iarzutkin (RUS); L 0 – 2	6	did not advance					
Bosco Ndayishimye; Fiston Niyongabo	Boys'	Siddihaluge/Mallawa (SRI); L 0 – 2	6	did not advance					
Bosco Ndayishimye; Fiston Niyongabo	Boys'	Mol/Berntsen (NOR); L 0 – 2	6	did not advance					
Bosco Ndayishimye; Fiston Niyongabo	Boys'	Bogarin/Frutos (PAR); L 0 – 2	6	did not advance					
Bosco Ndayishimye; Fiston Niyongabo	Boys'	Flores/Alvarez (GUA); L 0 – 2	6	did not advance					

== Tennis ==
Burundi qualified one athlete based on the 9 June 2014 ITF World Junior Rankings.

Singles

Athlete	Event	Round of 32	Round of 16	Quarterfinals	Semifinals	Final / BM	Rank
Athlete	Event	Opposition Score	Opposition Score	Opposition Score	Opposition Score	Opposition Score	Rank
Guy Orly Iradukunda	Boys' Singles	M Blaško (SVK); L 3 – 6, 3 – 6	did not advance				

Doubles

Athletes	Event	Round of 32	Round of 16	Quarterfinals	Semifinals	Final / BM	Rank
Athletes	Event	Opposition Score	Opposition Score	Opposition Score	Opposition Score	Opposition Score	Rank
Guy Orly Iradukunda (BDI); Lloyd Harris (RSA)	Boys' Doubles	—	K Majchrzak (POL); J Zieliński (POL); L 1 – 6, 4 – 6	did not advance			
Lesedi Sheya Jacobs (NAM); Guy Orly Iradukunda (BDI)	Mixed Doubles	I Ducu (ROU); M Zukas (ARG); L 3 – 6, 1 – 6	did not advance				
