= Marina Carrier =

Australian modern pentathlon Olympian

Personal information
- Nationality: Australia
- Born: 19 October 1996 (age 29) Sydney, New South Wales

Sport
- Country: Australia
- Sport: Modern pentathlon

Marina Carrier (born 1996) is an Australian Modern Pentathlon competitor and Olympian.

Carrier represented Australia at the 2020 Summer Olympics, Tokyo, in the modern pentathlon. Notably, she came third in the riding (show jumping) event with a clear round, and came 27th overall despite setbacks due to injury in the months leading into the Games.
