= Comoros at the 2014 Summer Youth Olympics =

- IOC code: COM
- NOC: Comité Olympique et Sportif des Iles Comores

in Nanjing
- Competitors: 4 in 2 sports
- Medals: Gold 0 Silver 0 Bronze 0 Total 0

Summer Youth Olympics appearances
- 2010; 2014; 2018

Comoros competed at the 2014 Summer Youth Olympics, in Nanjing, China from 16 August to 28 August 2014.

== Medalists ==
Medals awarded to participants of mixed-NOC (Combined) teams are represented in italics. These medals are not counted towards the individual NOC medal tally.

Medal	Name	Sport	Event	Date
Gold	Daou Aboubacar	Athletics	Mixed 8x100m Relay	26 August
Bronze	Dhakirina Fatima	Athletics	Mixed 8x100m Relay	26 August

== Athletics ==
Comoros qualified three athletes.

Qualification Legend: Q=Final A (medal); qB=Final B (non-medal); qC=Final C (non-medal); qD=Final D (non-medal); qE=Final E (non-medal)

Boys
Track & road events

Athlete	Event	Heats		Final	
Athlete	Event	Result	Rank	Result	Rank
Daou Aboubacar	1500 m	4:16.36	18 qB	4:19.74	17
Mohamed Miftahou	3000 m	9:00.01	15 qB	8:40.07	14

Girls
Track & road events

Athlete	Event	Heats		Final	
Athlete	Event	Result	Rank	Result	Rank
Dhakirina Fatima	800 m	2:28.17	19 qC	2:26.30	18

== Swimming ==
Comoros qualified one swimmer.

Boys

Athlete	Event	Heat		Semifinal		Final	
Athlete	Event	Time	Rank	Time	Rank	Time	Rank
Ibroihim Djoumoi	50 m freestyle	29.57	47	did not advance			
