= Djibouti at the 2014 Summer Youth Olympics =

- IOC code: DJI
- NOC: Comité National Olympique Djiboutien

in Nanjing
- Competitors: 5 in 3 sports
- Medals Ranked 80th: Gold 0 Silver 0 Bronze 1 Total 1

Summer Youth Olympics appearances
- 2010; 2014; 2018

Djibouti competed at the 2014 Summer Youth Olympics, in Nanjing, China from 16 August to 28 August 2014.

== Medalists ==
Medal	Name	Sport	Event	Date
Bronze	Mohamed Ismail Ibrahim	Athletics	Boys' 1500 m	24 August

== Athletics ==
Djibouti qualified three athletes.

Qualification Legend: Q=Final A (medal); qB=Final B (non-medal); qC=Final C (non-medal); qD=Final D (non-medal); qE=Final E (non-medal)

Boys
Track & road events

Athlete	Event	Heats		Final	
Athlete	Event	Result	Rank	Result	Rank
Abdi Aden Abdi	800 m	1:51.62	11 qB	1:53.24	10
Mohamed Ismail Ibrahim	1500 m	3:47.06 PB	2 Q	3:45.72 PB	3rd place, bronze medalist(s)

Girls
Track & road events

Athlete	Event	Heats		Final	
Athlete	Event	Result	Rank	Result	Rank
Kadra Mohamed Dembil	2000 m steeplechase	7:07.33	11 qB	7:13.44	14

== Swimming ==
Djibouti qualified one swimmer.

Boys

Athlete	Event	Heat		Semifinal		Final	
Athlete	Event	Time	Rank	Time	Rank	Time	Rank
Ahmed Bourhan Alwan	50 m freestyle	32.65	51	did not advance			

== Table Tennis ==
Djibouti was given a quota to compete by the tripartite committee.

Singles

Athlete	Event	Group Stage	Rank	Round of 16	Quarterfinals	Semifinals	Final / BM	Rank
Athlete	Event	Opposition Score	Rank	Opposition Score	Opposition Score	Opposition Score	Opposition Score	Rank
Fatouma Ali Salah	Girls	Group B S Mukherjee (IND); L 0 – 3	4 qB	A Saad (EGY); L w/o	did not advance			25
Fatouma Ali Salah	Girls	G Piccolin (ITA); L 0 – 3	4 qB	A Saad (EGY); L w/o	did not advance			25
Fatouma Ali Salah	Girls	G Liu (CHN); L 0 – 3	4 qB	A Saad (EGY); L w/o	did not advance			25

Team

Athletes	Event	Group Stage	Rank	Round of 16	Quarterfinals	Semifinals	Final / BM	Rank
Athletes	Event	Opposition Score	Rank	Opposition Score	Opposition Score	Opposition Score	Opposition Score	Rank
Africa 3 Fatouma Ali Salah (DJI); Soudes Alassani (TOG)	Mixed	Intercontinental 1 A Luo (CAN); B Afanador (PUR); L 0 – 3	4 qB	Austria; K Mischek (AUT); A Levenko (AUT); L 0 – 3	did not advance			25
Africa 3 Fatouma Ali Salah (DJI); Soudes Alassani (TOG)	Mixed	India; S Mukherjee (IND); A Yadav (IND); L 0 – 3	4 qB	Austria; K Mischek (AUT); A Levenko (AUT); L 0 – 3	did not advance			25
Africa 3 Fatouma Ali Salah (DJI); Soudes Alassani (TOG)	Mixed	Japan; M Kato (JPN); Y Muramatsu (JPN); L 0 – 3	4 qB	Austria; K Mischek (AUT); A Levenko (AUT); L 0 – 3	did not advance			25

Qualification Legend: Q=Main Bracket (medal); qB=Consolation Bracket (non-medal)
