= Liberia at the 2014 Summer Youth Olympics =

- IOC code: LBR
- NOC: Liberia National Olympic Committee

Summer Youth Olympics appearances
- 2010; 2014; 2018

Liberia was planning to participate at the 2014 Summer Youth Olympics, in Nanjing, China, but on 15 August 2014 they pulled out of the games due to pressure from Chinese Authorities in an attempt to prevent Ebola from West Africa from entering their nation.

== Athletics ==
Liberia qualified one athlete.

Qualification Legend: Q=Final A (medal); qB=Final B (non-medal); qC=Final C (non-medal); qD=Final D (non-medal); qE=Final E (non-medal)

Girls
Track & road events

Athlete	Event	Heats		Final	
Athlete	Event	Result	Rank	Result	Rank
Tracy Chayee	400 m hurdles	Withdrew			

== Swimming ==
Liberia qualified one swimmer.

Boys

Athlete	Event	Heat		Semifinal		Final	
Athlete	Event	Time	Rank	Time	Rank	Time	Rank
Momodu Sombai	50 m freestyle	Withdrew					
