= Federated States of Micronesia at the 2014 Summer Youth Olympics =

- IOC code: FSM
- NOC: Federated States of Micronesia National Olympic Committee

in Nanjing
- Competitors: 4 in 3 sports
- Medals: Gold 0 Silver 0 Bronze 0 Total 0

Summer Youth Olympics appearances
- 2010; 2014; 2018

Federated States of Micronesia competed at the 2014 Summer Youth Olympics, in Nanjing, China from 16 August to 28 August 2014.

== Athletics ==
Micronesia qualified one athlete.

Qualification Legend: Q=Final A (medal); qB=Final B (non-medal); qC=Final C (non-medal); qD=Final D (non-medal); qE=Final E (non-medal)

Girls
Track & road events

Athlete	Event	Heats		Final	
Athlete	Event	Result	Rank	Result	Rank
Mary Alexander	800 m	2:56.34	21 qC	DNS	

== Swimming ==
Micronesia qualified two swimmers.

Boys

Athlete	Event	Heat		Semifinal		Final	
Athlete	Event	Time	Rank	Time	Rank	Time	Rank
Derek Dainard	50 m freestyle	29.55	46	did not advance			

Girls

Athlete	Event	Heat		Semifinal		Final	
Athlete	Event	Time	Rank	Time	Rank	Time	Rank
Prylain Manuel	50 m freestyle	33.97	46	did not advance			

== Weightlifting ==
Micronesia was given a quota to compete in a boys' event by the tripartite committee.

Boys

Athlete	Event	Snatch		Clean & jerk		Total	Rank
Athlete	Event	Result	Rank	Result	Rank	Total	Rank
Marcellus Taman	−62 kg	53	11	60	11	113	11
