= Rwanda at the 2014 Summer Youth Olympics =

- IOC code: RWA
- NOC: Comité National Olympique et Sportif du Rwanda

in Nanjing
- Competitors: 11 in 4 sports
- Medals: Gold 0 Silver 0 Bronze 0 Total 0

Summer Youth Olympics appearances
- 2010; 2014; 2018

Rwanda competed at the 2014 Summer Youth Olympics, in Nanjing, China from 16 August to 28 August 2014.

== Athletics ==
Rwanda qualified four athletes.

Qualification Legend: Q=Final A (medal); qB=Final B (non-medal); qC=Final C (non-medal); qD=Final D (non-medal); qE=Final E (non-medal)

Boys
Track & road events

| Athlete | Event | Heats | | Final | |
| Athlete | Event | Result | Rank | Result | Rank |
|---|---|---|---|---|---|
| James Sugira | 1500 m | 3:47.28 PB | 3 Q | 3:48.93 | 8 |
| Jean Myasiro | 3000 m | 8:33.94 PB | 11 qB | 8:32.44 PB | 10 |

Girls
Track & road events

| Athlete | Event | Heats | | Final | |
| Athlete | Event | Result | Rank | Result | Rank |
|---|---|---|---|---|---|
| Venantie Mukandayisenga | 1500 m | 4:28.67 PB | 7 Q | 4:29.23 | 7 |

== Beach Volleyball ==
Rwanda qualified a boys' and girls' team by their performance at the CAVB Qualification Tournament.

| Athletes | Event | Preliminary round | Standing | Round of 24 | Round of 16 | Quarterfinals | Semifinals | Final / BM | Rank |
| Athletes | Event | Opposition Score | Standing | Opposition Score | Opposition Score | Opposition Score | Opposition Score | Opposition Score | Rank |
|---|---|---|---|---|---|---|---|---|---|
| Elias Ndagano; Sylvestre Ndayisabye | Boys' | Kratz – Pristauz (AUT) | 6 | did not advance | | | | | |
| Elias Ndagano; Sylvestre Ndayisabye | Boys' | Gomez – Hernandez (VEN) | 6 | did not advance | | | | | |
| Elias Ndagano; Sylvestre Ndayisabye | Boys' | Ashfiya – Licardo (INA); L 0-2 (14-21, 13-21) | 6 | did not advance | | | | | |
| Elias Ndagano; Sylvestre Ndayisabye | Boys' | Kmiecik – Macura (POL) | 6 | did not advance | | | | | |
| Elias Ndagano; Sylvestre Ndayisabye | Boys' | DeFalco – Richard (USA); L 0-2 | 6 | did not advance | | | | | |
| Seraphine Mukantambara; Lea Uwimbabazi | Girls' | Bell – Kendall (AUS); L 0-2 (14-21, 4-21) | 5 | did not advance | | | | | |
| Seraphine Mukantambara; Lea Uwimbabazi | Girls' | Daniel – Joe (VAN); W 2-0 (21-14, 21-19) | 5 | did not advance | | | | | |
| Seraphine Mukantambara; Lea Uwimbabazi | Girls' | Bernier – Cajigas (PUR) | 5 | did not advance | | | | | |
| Seraphine Mukantambara; Lea Uwimbabazi | Girls' | Makroguzova – Rugykh (RUS) | 5 | did not advance | | | | | |
| Seraphine Mukantambara; Lea Uwimbabazi | Girls' | Hiruela – Verasio (ARG); L 0-2 (7-21, 10-21) | 5 | did not advance | | | | | |

== Cycling ==
Rwanda was given a girls' team to compete from the tripartite commission.

Team

| Athletes | Event | Cross-Country Eliminator | | Time Trial | | | BMX | | Cross-Country Race | | | Road Race | | | Total Pts | Rank |
| Athletes | Event | Rank | Points | Time | Rank | Points | Rank | Points | Time | Rank | Points | Time | Rank | Points | Total Pts | Rank |
|---|---|---|---|---|---|---|---|---|---|---|---|---|---|---|---|---|
| Clementine Niyonsaba; Benitha Uwamariya | Girls' Team | DNS | 0 | 7:04.50 | 26 | 0 | 31 | 0 | DNS | | 0 | 1:22:05; 1:22:07 | 44; 45 | 0 | 0 | 32 |

Mixed Relay

| Athletes | Event | Cross-Country Girls' Race | Cross-Country Boys' Race | Boys' Road Race | Girls' Road Race | Total Time | Rank |
|---|---|---|---|---|---|---|---|
| Maria Peinado (BOL); Abderrahim Zahiri (MAR); Mohcine Elkouraji (MAR); Clementine Niyonsaba (RWA) | Mixed Team Relay | 4:25 | 3:24 | 5:40 | 7:15 | 20:44 | 26 |

== Swimming ==
Rwanda qualified one swimmer.

Boys

| Athlete | Event | Heat | | Semifinal | | Final | |
| Athlete | Event | Time | Rank | Time | Rank | Time | Rank |
|---|---|---|---|---|---|---|---|
| Abdoul Gatete Babu | 50 m freestyle | DSQ | | did not advance | | | |
| Abdoul Gatete Babu | 50 m butterfly | 34.44 | 45 | did not advance | | | |
