= Malawi at the 2014 Summer Youth Olympics =

- IOC code: MAW
- NOC: Olympic and Commonwealth Games Association of Malawi

in Nanjing
- Competitors: 5 in 2 sports
- Medals: Gold 0 Silver 0 Bronze 0 Total 0

Summer Youth Olympics appearances
- 2010; 2014; 2018

Malawi competed at the 2014 Summer Youth Olympics, in Nanjing, China from 16 August to 28 August 2014.

== Athletics ==
Malawi qualified four athletes.

Qualification Legend: Q=Final A (medal); qB=Final B (non-medal); qC=Final C (non-medal); qD=Final D (non-medal); qE=Final E (non-medal)

Boys
Track & road events

Athlete	Event	Heats		Final	
Athlete	Event	Result	Rank	Result	Rank
Mazuzo Kasiteni	800 m	DSQ qC		2:00.70	16
Abina Tchinga	1500 m	3:54.35 PB	13 qB	3:56.56	14
Leo Chikhwaza	3000 m	8:30.40 PB	10 qB	8:32.07	9

Girls
Track & road events

Athlete	Event	Heats		Final	
Athlete	Event	Result	Rank	Result	Rank
Nalicy Chirwa	3000 m	10:34.27	17 qB	10:35.98	17

== Swimming ==
Malawi qualified one swimmer.

Girls

Athlete	Event	Heat		Semifinal		Final	
Athlete	Event	Time	Rank	Time	Rank	Time	Rank
Joyce Tafatatha	50 m freestyle	27.73	35	did not advance			
Joyce Tafatatha	50 m backstroke	31.59	36	did not advance			
