= Cameroon at the 2014 Summer Youth Olympics =

- IOC code: CMR
- NOC: Cameroon Olympic and Sports Committee
- Website: http://www.cnosc.org/

in Nanjing
- Competitors: 3 in 3 sports

Summer Youth Olympics appearances
- 2010; 2014; 2018

Cameroon competed at the 2014 Summer Youth Olympics, in Nanjing, China from 16 August to 28 August 2014.

== Athletics ==
Cameroon qualified one athlete.

Qualification Legend: Q=Final A (medal); qB=Final B (non-medal); qC=Final C (non-medal); qD=Final D (non-medal); qE=Final E (non-medal)

Girls
Track & road events

| Athlete | Event | Heats | | Final | |
| Athlete | Event | Result | Rank | Result | Rank |
|---|---|---|---|---|---|
| Carine Tatah | 3000 m | 10:34.86 | 18 qB | DNS | |

== Swimming ==
Cameroon qualified one swimmer.

Boys

| Athlete | Event | Heat | | Semifinal | | Final | |
| Athlete | Event | Time | Rank | Time | Rank | Time | Rank |
|---|---|---|---|---|---|---|---|
| Fabrice Guedia Zeutsop | 50 m freestyle | 32.17 | 50 | did not advance | | | |
| Fabrice Guedia Zeutsop | 50 m breaststroke | 40.01 | 37 | did not advance | | | |

== Taekwondo ==
Cameroon was given a wild card to compete.

Girls

| Athlete | Event | Round of 16 | Quarterfinals | Semifinals | Final | Rank |
| Athlete | Event | Opposition Result | Opposition Result | Opposition Result | Opposition Result | Rank |
|---|---|---|---|---|---|---|
| Ornella Ngassa Sokeng | −63 kg | K Alizadeh (IRI); L 0–23 (RSC) | did not advance | | | 9 |
