= Marshall Islands at the 2014 Summer Youth Olympics =

- IOC code: MHL
- NOC: Marshall Islands National Olympic Committee

in Nanjing
- Competitors: 4 in 3 sports
- Medals: Gold 0 Silver 0 Bronze 0 Total 0

Summer Youth Olympics appearances
- 2010; 2014; 2018

Marshall Islands competed at the 2014 Summer Youth Olympics, in Nanjing, China from 16 August to 28 August 2014.

== Athletics ==
Marshall Islands qualified one athlete.

Qualification Legend: Q=Final A (medal); qB=Final B (non-medal); qC=Final C (non-medal); qD=Final D (non-medal); qE=Final E (non-medal)

Girls
Track & road events

Athlete	Event	Heats		Final	
Athlete	Event	Result	Rank	Result	Rank
Eve Burns	400 m	DNF qC		DNS	

== Swimming ==
Marshall Islands qualified one swimmer.

Boys

Athlete	Event	Heat		Semifinal		Final	
Athlete	Event	Time	Rank	Time	Rank	Time	Rank
Troy Kojenlang	50 m freestyle	26.39	42	did not advance			
Troy Kojenlang	100 m breaststroke	1:10.80	36	did not advance			

== Wrestling ==
Marshall Islands qualified two athletes based on its performance at the 2014 Oceania Cadet Championships.

Key:
- VT - Victory by Fall.
- PP - Decision by Points - the loser with technical points.
- PO - Decision by Points - the loser without technical points.

Boys

Athlete	Event	Group stage				Final / RM	Rank
Athlete	Event	Opposition Score	Opposition Score	Opposition Score	Rank	Opposition Score	Rank
Kaiser Muller	Greco-Roman -50kg	C Correa (BRA); L 0 – 4	H Bounasri (ALG); L 0 – 4	I Bakhromov (UZB); L 0 – 4	4 Q	D Cojocari (MDA); L 0 – 4	8

Girls

Athlete	Event	Group stage				Final / RM	Rank
Athlete	Event	Opposition Score	Opposition Score	Opposition Score	Rank	Opposition Score	Rank
Ilania Keju	Freestyle -70kg	T Kilic (TUR); L 0 – 4	C Park (KOR); L 1 – 4	A Youin (CIV); W 3 – 1	3 Q	L Ayovi (ECU); L 0 – 4 ^{VT}	6
