= Tanzania at the 2014 Summer Youth Olympics =

- IOC code: TAN
- NOC: Tanzania Olympic Committee

in Nanjing
- Competitors: 4 in 2 sports
- Medals: Gold 0 Silver 0 Bronze 0 Total 0

Summer Youth Olympics appearances
- 2010; 2014; 2018

Tanzania competed at the 2014 Summer Youth Olympics, in Nanjing, China from 16 August to 28 August 2014.

== Athletics ==
Tanzania qualified two athletes.

Qualification Legend: Q=Final A (medal); qB=Final B (non-medal); qC=Final C (non-medal); qD=Final D (non-medal); qE=Final E (non-medal)

Boys
Track & road events

Athlete	Event	Heats		Final	
Athlete	Event	Result	Rank	Result	Rank
John Churi	1500 m	3:52.32 PB	10 qB	3:53.88	12

Girls
Track & road events

Athlete	Event	Heats		Final	
Athlete	Event	Result	Rank	Result	Rank
Dorcas Ilanda	1500 m	4:36.15	14 qB	4:36.35	12

== Swimming ==
Tanzania qualified two swimmers.

Boys

Athlete	Event	Heat		Semifinal		Final	
Athlete	Event	Time	Rank	Time	Rank	Time	Rank
Ammaar Ghadiyali	50 m freestyle	26.16	40	did not advance			
Ammaar Ghadiyali	50 m butterfly	28.41	43	did not advance			

Girls

Athlete	Event	Heat		Semifinal		Final	
Athlete	Event	Time	Rank	Time	Rank	Time	Rank
Sabrina Asif Kassam	50 m freestyle	32.54	43	did not advance			
Sabrina Asif Kassam	100 m freestyle	DNS		did not advance			
Sabrina Asif Kassam	50 m breaststroke	44.30	31	did not advance			
