= Mozambique at the 2014 Summer Youth Olympics =

- IOC code: MOZ
- NOC: Comité Olímpico Nacional de Moçambique

in Nanjing
- Competitors: 3 in 2 sports
- Medals: Gold 0 Silver 0 Bronze 0 Total 0

Summer Youth Olympics appearances
- 2010; 2014; 2018

Mozambique competed at the 2014 Summer Youth Olympics, in Nanjing, China from 16 August to 28 August 2014.

== Athletics ==
Mozambique qualified one athlete.

Qualification Legend: Q=Final A (medal); qB=Final B (non-medal); qC=Final C (non-medal); qD=Final D (non-medal); qE=Final E (non-medal)

Girls
Track & road events

Athlete	Event	Heats		Final	
Athlete	Event	Result	Rank	Result	Rank
Isabel Mate	200 m	27.62	20 qC	27.52	19

== Swimming ==
Mozambique qualified two swimmers.

Boys

Athlete	Event	Heat		Semifinal		Final	
Athlete	Event	Time	Rank	Time	Rank	Time	Rank
Shakil Fakir	50 m freestyle	24.85	33	did not advance			
Shakil Fakir	50 m butterfly	26.84	40	did not advance			

Girls

Athlete	Event	Heat		Semifinal		Final	
Athlete	Event	Time	Rank	Time	Rank	Time	Rank
Jannah Sonnenschein	50 m butterfly	29.35	26	did not advance			
Jannah Sonnenschein	100 m butterfly	1:03.81	21	did not advance			
