= Mali at the 2014 Summer Youth Olympics =

- IOC code: MLI
- NOC: Comité National Olympique et Sportif du Mali

in Nanjing
- Competitors: 4 in 3 sports
- Medals: Gold 0 Silver 0 Bronze 0 Total 0

Summer Youth Olympics appearances
- 2010; 2014; 2018

Mali competed at the 2014 Summer Youth Olympics, in Nanjing, China from 16 August to 28 August 2014.

== Athletics ==
Mali qualified two athletes.

Qualification Legend: Q=Final A (medal); qB=Final B (non-medal); qC=Final C (non-medal); qD=Final D (non-medal); qE=Final E (non-medal)

Boys
Track & road events

Athlete	Event	Heats		Final	
Athlete	Event	Result	Rank	Result	Rank
Sekou Traore	100 m	11.24	16 qB	11.20	15

Girls
Field events

Athlete	Event	Qualification		Final	
Athlete	Event	Distance	Rank	Distance	Rank
Kenifing Traore	Javelin throw	42.89	16 qB	41.88	16

== Swimming ==
Mali qualified one swimmer.

Boys

Athlete	Event	Heat		Semifinal		Final	
Athlete	Event	Time	Rank	Time	Rank	Time	Rank
Oumar Toure	50 m freestyle	24.61	30	did not advance			
Oumar Toure	50 m butterfly	26.05	32	did not advance			

== Taekwondo ==
Mali was given a wild card to compete.

Girls

Athlete	Event	Round of 16	Quarterfinals	Semifinals	Final	Rank
Athlete	Event	Opposition Result	Opposition Result	Opposition Result	Opposition Result	Rank
Zeinab Doumbia	−55 kg	G Mwaka (COD); L DSQ	did not advance			9
