= Morocco at the 2014 Summer Youth Olympics =

- IOC code: MAR
- NOC: Moroccan Olympic Committee; Arabic: اللجنة الأولمبية الوطنية المغربية
- Website: www.marocolympique.org (in French)

in Nanjing
- Competitors: 15 in 6 sports
- Medals Ranked 80th: Gold 0 Silver 0 Bronze 1 Total 1

Summer Youth Olympics appearances (overview)
- 2010; 2014; 2018

Morocco competed at the 2014 Summer Youth Olympics, in Nanjing, China from 16 August to 28 August 2014.

== Athletics ==
Morocco qualified seven athletes.

Qualification Legend: Q=Final A (medal); qB=Final B (non-medal); qC=Final C (non-medal); qD=Final D (non-medal); qE=Final E (non-medal)

Boys
Track & road events

Athlete	Event	Heats		Final	
Athlete	Event	Result	Rank	Result	Rank
Mohamed Elamrani	800 m	1:50.26 PB	2 Q	1:49.99	4
Mostafa Smaili	1500 m	3:51.90	8 Q	3:46.28 PB	4
Amine Zahaf	3000 m	8:14.51 PB	4 Q	8:21.62	7
Hicham Chemlal	2000 m steeplechase	5:39.60	2 Q	5:40.94	3rd place, bronze medalist(s)

Girls
Track & road events

Athlete	Event	Heats		Final	
Athlete	Event	Result	Rank	Result	Rank
Saadia Fadili	1500 m	DNF		DNS	
Soukaina Belil	3000 m	9:45.70	12 qB	9:44.90	11
Nadia El Hakouni	2000 m steeplechase	7:16.92	13 qB	7:05.39	13

== Cycling ==
Morocco qualified a boys' team based on its ranking issued by the UCI.

Team

Athletes	Event	Cross-Country Eliminator		Time Trial			BMX		Cross-Country Race			Road Race			Total Pts	Rank
Athletes	Event	Rank	Points	Time	Rank	Points	Rank	Points	Time	Rank	Points	Time	Rank	Points	Total Pts	Rank
Mohcine Elkouraji; Abderrahim Zahiri	Boys' Team	23	0	5:26.81	19	0	DNS	0	DNF		0	1:37:42; 1:37:23	34; 12	6	6	25

Mixed Relay

Athletes	Event	Cross-Country Girls' Race	Cross-Country Boys' Race	Boys' Road Race	Girls' Road Race	Total Time	Rank
Maria Peinado (BOL); Abderrahim Zahiri (MAR); Mohcine Elkouraji (MAR); Clementine Niyonsaba (RWA)	Mixed Team Relay	4:25	3:24	5:40	7:15	20:44	26

== Equestrian ==
Morocco qualified a rider.

Athlete	Horse	Event	Round 1		Round 2			Total	
Athlete	Horse	Event	Penalties	Rank	Penalties	Total	Rank	Penalties	Rank
Lilia Maamar	Figaro	Individual Jumping	DNF						
Africa; Mohamed Hayab (EGY); Lilia Maamar (MAR); Maeva Boyer (SEN); Alexa Stais (RSA); Sophie Teede (ZIM)	White Lady; Figaro; Cornetta; Dominand; Carsar	Team Jumping	0; 4; 8; ~~18~~; ~~8~~	4	0; ~~16~~; 0; ~~12~~; 4	16	4	16	4

== Gymnastics ==
=== Artistic Gymnastics ===
Morocco qualified one athlete based on its performance at the 2014 African Artistic Gymnastics Championships.

Boys

Athlete	Event	Apparatus						Total	Rank
Athlete	Event	F	PH	R	V	PB	HB	Total	Rank
Hamza Hajjaji	Qualification	11.850 38	7.750 40	2.250 41	12.850 35	8.750 39	9.650 38	53.100	39

=== Rhythmic Gymnastics ===
Morocco qualified one athlete based on its performance at the 2014 African Rhythmic Championships.

Individual

Athlete	Event	Qualification						Final					
Athlete	Event	Hoop	Ball	Clubs	Ribbon	Total	Rank	Hoop	Ball	Clubs	Ribbon	Total	Rank
Basma Ouatay	Individual	10.500	10.500	11.600	11.250	43.850	16	did not advance					

== Taekwondo ==
Morocco qualified one athlete based on its performance at the Taekwondo Qualification Tournament.

Boys

Athlete	Event	Round of 16	Quarterfinals	Semifinals	Final	Rank
Athlete	Event	Opposition Result	Opposition Result	Opposition Result	Opposition Result	Rank
Mohamed El Attari	−73 kg	—N/a	Adnam Karim (GER); L 0 – 12 (PTG)	did not advance		5

== Weightlifting ==
Morocco qualified 1 quota in the boys' and girls' events based on the team ranking after the 2014 Weightlifting Junior & Youth African Championships.

Boys

Athlete	Event	Snatch		Clean & jerk		Total	Rank
Athlete	Event	Result	Rank	Result	Rank	Total	Rank
Hicham Moum	−77 kg	106	8	131	8	237	9

Girls

Athlete	Event	Snatch		Clean & jerk		Total	Rank
Athlete	Event	Result	Rank	Result	Rank	Total	Rank
Youssra Karim	−58 kg	56	8	74	8	130	8

== See also ==
- Morocco at the 2014 Winter Olympics
