= Derek Dainard =

Micronesian swimmer

Personal information
- Born: May 30, 1997 (age 29)

Sport
- Sport: Swimming
- Strokes: Butterfly, freestyle

Derek Dainard (born May 30, 1997) is a Micronesian swimmer. He competed in the 50 m freestyle and 50 m butterfly events at the 2013 World Aquatics Championships.
