= James Sugira =

Rwandan long-distance runner

Personal information
- Born: 2 February 1997 (age 28)

Sport
- Country: Rwanda
- Sport: Long-distance running

James Sugira (born 2 February 1997) is a Rwandan long-distance runner.

In 2014, he competed in the boys' 1500 metres event at the 2014 Summer Youth Olympics held in Nanjing, China.

In 2017, he competed in the senior men's race at the 2017 IAAF World Cross Country Championships held in Kampala, Uganda. He finished in 49th place.

In 2018, he represented Rwanda at the 2018 Commonwealth Games held in Gold Coast. He competed in the men's 5000 metres event and he finished in 7th place.
