= Palestine at the 2014 Summer Youth Olympics =

- IOC code: PLE
- NOC: Palestine Olympic Committee

in Nanjing
- Competitors: 4 in 2 sports
- Medals: Gold 0 Silver 0 Bronze 0 Total 0

Summer Youth Olympics appearances
- 2010; 2014; 2018

Palestine competed at the 2014 Summer Youth Olympics, in Nanjing, China from 16 August to 28 August 2014.

== Athletics ==
Palestine qualified two athletes.

Qualification Legend: Q=Final A (medal); qB=Final B (non-medal); qC=Final C (non-medal); qD=Final D (non-medal); qE=Final E (non-medal)

Boys
Track & road events

| Athlete | Event | Heats | | Final | |
| Athlete | Event | Result | Rank | Result | Rank |
|---|---|---|---|---|---|
| Sufyan Hamdan | 1500 m | 4:09.24 PB | 17 qB | DNS | |

Girls
Track & road events

| Athlete | Event | Heats | | Final | |
| Athlete | Event | Result | Rank | Result | Rank |
|---|---|---|---|---|---|
| Suha Zawahra | 1500 m | 5.44.58 | 19 qB | DNS | |

== Swimming ==
Palestine qualified two swimmers.

Boys

| Athlete | Event | Heat | | Semifinal | | Final | |
| Athlete | Event | Time | Rank | Time | Rank | Time | Rank |
|---|---|---|---|---|---|---|---|
| Anas Altamari | 50 m freestyle | 26.36 | 41 | did not advance | | | |

Girls

| Athlete | Event | Heat | | Semifinal | | Final | |
| Athlete | Event | Time | Rank | Time | Rank | Time | Rank |
|---|---|---|---|---|---|---|---|
| Shayma Farhan | 50 m freestyle | 32.75 | 44 | did not advance | | | |
| Shayma Farhan | 50 m breaststroke | 47.91 | 32 | did not advance | | | |
