= Nelia Martins =

East Timorese middle-distance runner

Personal information
- Born: July 9, 1998 (age 28) Dili, Timor Leste

Sport
- Country: East Timor
- Sport: Middle-distance running

Nelia Martins (born July 9, 1998) is an East Timorese middle-distance runner. She competed at the 2016 Summer Olympics in the women's 1500 metres race; her time of 5:00.53 in the heats did not qualify her for the semifinals.
