= Dalila Abdulkadir =

Bahraini long-distance runner (born 1998)

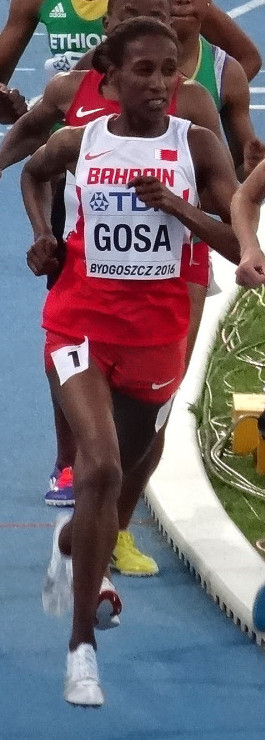
Dalila Abdulkadir in 2016

Dalila Abdulkadir Gosa (born June 27, 1998) is a Bahraini long-distance runner. She was scheduled to compete at the 2016 Summer Olympics in the women's 5000 metres race but did not start the race.
