= Democratic Republic of the Congo at the 2014 Summer Youth Olympics =

- IOC code: COD
- NOC: Comité Olympique Congolais

in Nanjing
- Competitors: 4 in 3 sports
- Medals: Gold 0 Silver 0 Bronze 0 Total 0

Summer Youth Olympics appearances
- 2010; 2014; 2018

Democratic Republic of the Congo competed at the 2014 Summer Youth Olympics, in Nanjing, China from 16 August to 28 August 2014.

== Athletics ==
Democratic Republic of the Congo qualified two athletes.

Qualification Legend: Q=Final A (medal); qB=Final B (non-medal); qC=Final C (non-medal); qD=Final D (non-medal); qE=Final E (non-medal)

Boys
Field Events

Athlete	Event	Qualification		Final	
Athlete	Event	Distance	Rank	Distance	Rank
Djafar Swedi	Long jump	6.29	13 qB	6.04	12

Girls
Track & road events

Athlete	Event	Heats		Final	
Athlete	Event	Result	Rank	Result	Rank
Inesse Kazadi Tshinguta	3000 m	10:53.66	19 qB	10:52.09	18

== Swimming ==
Democratic Republic of the Congo qualified one swimmer.

Boys

Athlete	Event	Heat		Semifinal		Final	
Athlete	Event	Time	Rank	Time	Rank	Time	Rank
Jonathan Sokomayi Mubikayi	50 m freestyle	31.69	49	did not advance			

== Taekwondo ==
Democratic Republic of the Congo was given a wild card to compete.

Girls

Athlete	Event	Round of 16	Quarterfinals	Semifinals	Final	Rank
Athlete	Event	Opposition Result	Opposition Result	Opposition Result	Opposition Result	Rank
Glody Mwaka Masale	−55 kg	Z Doumbia (MLI); W DSQ	I Babić (CRO); L 1 – 14 (PTG)	did not advance		5
