= Mulugeta Asefa Uma =

Ethiopian long-distance runner

Personal information
- Nationality: Ethiopian
- Born: Mulugeta Asefa Uma; 12 March 1998 (age 28) Ethiopia
- Occupation: long-distance runner
- Years active: 2014–present

Sport
- Country: Ethiopia
- Sport: Athletics
- Events: Marathon, 1500 metres, 10 Mile road

Achievements and titles
- Personal bests: Marathon: 2:05:33 (2024); 1500 metres: 3:41.10 (2015); 10 Mile road: 46:01 (2023)

Mulugeta Asefa Uma (born 12 March 1998) is an Ethiopian long-distance runner who has competed in events from the 1500 metres to the marathon. He is a Youth Olympic Games and World U18 Championships medallist, and a major marathon winner.

== Early life and youth career ==
Mulugeta Asefa Uma showed early promise in middle-distance running. He earned a silver medal in the 1500 metres at the 2014 Summer Youth Olympics in Nanjing, China, with a time of 3:45.08. The following year, he secured another silver medal in the 1500m at the 2015 World Youth Championships in Athletics in Cali, Colombia, clocking 3:41.10. He also competed in the African Youth Games, winning a silver medal in the 1500m in 2014.

== Senior career ==
Transitioning from his middle-distance success, Mulugeta Asefa Uma found significant triumph in long-distance road running. By September 2023, he demonstrated his growing prowess with a personal best of 46:01 in the 10 Miles Road event.

He won the 2024 Paris Marathon in 2024. In only his fourth attempt at the distance, Uma crossed the finish line first with a new personal best of 2:05:33. He then won the Toronto Waterfront Marathon, completing the race in 2:07:05. He then finished fifth at the prestigious 2025 Tokyo Marathon, a World Marathon Major event, recording a time of 2:05:46.

== Personal bests ==
- Marathon: 2:05:33 (Paris, 7 April 2024)
- 1500 metres: 3:41.10 (Cali, 18 July 2015)
- 10 Miles Road: 46:01 (Dam tot Damloop, 17 September 2023)

== Achievements ==
Year	Competition	Venue	Position	Event	Time
2014	Youth Olympic Games	Nanjing	2nd	1500m	3:45.08
2014	African Youth Games	Gaborone	2nd	1500m	3:46.84
2015	World U18 Championships	Cali	2nd	1500m	3:41.10
2024	Paris Marathon	Paris	1st	Marathon	2:05:33
2024	Toronto Waterfront Marathon	Toronto	1st	Marathon	2:07:05
2025	Tokyo Marathon	Tokyo	5th	Marathon	2:05:46
