= Maldives at the 2014 Summer Youth Olympics =

- IOC code: MDV
- NOC: Maldives Olympic Committee

in Nanjing
- Competitors: 3 in 2 sports
- Medals: Gold 0 Silver 0 Bronze 0 Total 0

Summer Youth Olympics appearances
- 2010; 2014; 2018

Maldives competed at the 2014 Summer Youth Olympics, in Nanjing, China from 16 August to 28 August 2014.

== Athletics ==
Maldives qualified one athlete.

Qualification Legend: Q=Final A (medal); qB=Final B (non-medal); qC=Final C (non-medal); qD=Final D (non-medal); qE=Final E (non-medal)

Boys
Track & road events

Athlete	Event	Heats		Final	
Athlete	Event	Result	Rank	Result	Rank
Hussain Fahumee	100 m	26.89	33 qD	DNS	

== Swimming ==
Maldives qualified two swimmers.

Boys

Athlete	Event	Heat		Semifinal		Final	
Athlete	Event	Time	Rank	Time	Rank	Time	Rank
Mohamed Muthasim Adnan	50 m freestyle	27.03	43	did not advance			
Mohamed Muthasim Adnan	50 m butterfly	28.57	44	did not advance			

Girls

Athlete	Event	Heat		Semifinal		Final	
Athlete	Event	Time	Rank	Time	Rank	Time	Rank
Aishath Sajina	50 m freestyle	32.90	45	did not advance			
