= Weightlifting at the 2014 Summer Youth Olympics =

Weightlifting at the II Summer Youth Olympic Games
- Venue: Nanjing International Expo Center
- Dates: 17–23 August

Weightlifting at the 2014 Summer Youth Olympics was held from 17 to 23 August at the Nanjing International Expo Center in Nanjing, China.

== Qualification ==
Each National Olympic Committee (NOC) can enter a maximum of 4 competitors, 2 per each gender. As hosts, China was given the maximum quota, but only selected 1 athlete per gender and a further 11 boys and 9 girls was to be decided by the Tripartite Commission, but only 9 boys and 6 girls were selected, the remaining places were reallocated. The remaining 86 places shall be decided by team classification results from qualification events, namely the 2013 World Youth Championships and five continental qualification tournaments.

To be eligible to participate at the Youth Olympics athletes must have been born between 1 January 1997 and 31 December 1999. Furthermore, NOCs will only be allowed to enter a single athlete in an event.

=== Boys ===
Event	Location	Date	Quotas	Qualified
Host Nation	-	-	1	China
2013 World Youth Championships	(Uzbekistan) Tashkent	6–13 April 2013	2	Russia; Egypt; India; Iran; Romania; Mexico; Kazakhstan; Armenia; Uzbekistan
2013 World Youth Championships	(Uzbekistan) Tashkent	6–13 April 2013	1	Thailand; Ukraine; Poland; Vietnam; Colombia; Venezuela; North Korea
2014 Asian Youth Championships	(Thailand) Bang Saen	4–12 March 2014	1	South Korea; Indonesia; Kyrgyzstan; Chinese Taipei; Syria
2014 African Youth Championships	(Tunisia) Tunis	15–22 April 2014	1	Tunisia; Libya; Algeria; Morocco
2014 European Youth Championships	(Poland) Ciechanow	28 Apr–3 May 2014	1	Bulgaria; Turkey; Germany; Italy; France
2014 Pan-American Youth Championships	(Peru) Chiclayo	7–11 May 2014	1	Peru; United States; Ecuador; Dominican Republic
2014 Oceania Youth Championship	(New Caledonia) Mont Dore	25–31 May 2014	1	New Zealand; Australia; Papua New Guinea; Fiji
Tripartite Invitation	-	-	1	Federated States of Micronesia; Iraq; Kiribati; Nauru; Nicaragua; Pakistan; Sierra Leone; Tonga; Turkmenistan
Reallocation	-	-	1	Kenya; Saudi Arabia; Serbia
TOTAL			60	

=== Girls ===
Event	Location	Date	Quotas	Qualified
Host Nation	-	-	1	China
2013 World Youth Championships	(Uzbekistan) Tashkent	6–13 April 2013	2	Mexico; North Korea; Russia; Thailand; Kazakhstan; Vietnam; Romania
2013 World Youth Championships	(Uzbekistan) Tashkent	6–13 April 2013	1	Ecuador; Venezuela; Indonesia; Colombia; Myanmar; Poland; Ukraine; Egypt
2014 Asian Youth Championships	(Thailand) Bang Saen	4–12 March 2014	1	Chinese Taipei; India; Mongolia; Uzbekistan
2014 African Youth Championships	(Tunisia) Tunis	15–22 April 2014	1	Tunisia; Algeria; Morocco
2014 European Youth Championships	(Poland) Ciechanow	28 Apr–3 May 2014	1	Turkey; Bulgaria; Armenia; Italy
2014 Pan-American Youth Championships	(Peru) Chiclayo	7–11 May 2014	1	Peru; Brazil; United States
2014 Oceania Youth Championship	(New Caledonia) Mont Dore	25–31 May 2014	1	Australia; Papua New Guinea; Fiji
Tripartite Invitation	-	-	1	Bangladesh; Ghana; Madagascar; Malta; Seychelles; Solomon Islands
Reallocation	-	-	1	Argentina; Chile; Hungary; Latvia
TOTAL			50	

== Schedule ==
The schedule was released by the Nanjing Youth Olympic Games Organizing Committee.

All times are CST (UTC+8)

Event date	Event day	Starting time	Event details
August 17	Sunday	14:30	Girls' -48 kg
August 17	Sunday	18:00	Boys' -56 kg
August 18	Monday	14:30	Girls' -53 kg
August 18	Monday	18:00	Boys' -62 kg
August 19	Tuesday	14:30	Girls' -58 kg
August 19	Tuesday	18:00	Boys' -69 kg
August 21	Thursday	14:30	Girls' -63 kg
August 21	Thursday	18:00	Boys' -77 kg
August 22	Friday	14:30	Girls' +63 kg
August 22	Friday	18:00	Boys' -85 kg
August 23	Saturday	18:00	Boys' +85 kg

== Medal summary ==
=== Medal table ===
* Host nation (China)

Rank	Nation	Gold	Silver	Bronze	Total
1	Thailand	2	1	0	3
2	Armenia	2	0	0	2
2	China*	2	0	0	2
4	Russia	1	3	0	4
5	North Korea	1	2	0	3
6	Egypt	1	0	1	2
7	Bulgaria	1	0	0	1
7	Chinese Taipei	1	0	0	1
9	Uzbekistan	0	1	1	2
10	India	0	1	0	1
10	Mexico	0	1	0	1
10	Serbia	0	1	0	1
10	Vietnam	0	1	0	1
14	Kazakhstan	0	0	2	2
15	Argentina	0	0	1	1
15	Colombia	0	0	1	1
15	France	0	0	1	1
15	Italy	0	0	1	1
15	Latvia	0	0	1	1
15	Tunisia	0	0	1	1
15	Ukraine	0	0	1	1
Totals (21 entries)		11	11	11	33

=== Boy's events ===
Event	Gold	Silver	Bronze
56 kg	Meng Cheng; China	Nguyễn Trần Anh Tuấn; Vietnam	Adkhamjon Ergashev; Uzbekistan
62 kg	Pak Jong-ju; North Korea	Sakda Meeboon; Thailand	Mirko Zanni; Italy
69 kg	Bozhidar Andreev; Bulgaria	Viacheslav Iarkin; Russia	Andrés Caicedo; Colombia
77 kg	Hakob Mkrtchyan; Armenia	Ragala Venkat Rahul; India	Zhaslan Kaliyev; Kazakhstan
85 kg	Khetag Khugaev; Russia	Farkhodbek Sobirov; Uzbekistan	Mohamed Shosha; Egypt
+85 kg	Simon Martirosyan; Armenia	Tamaš Kajdoči; Serbia	Anthony Coullet; France

=== Girl's events ===
Event	Gold	Silver	Bronze
48 kg	Jiang Huihua; China	Ri Song-gum; North Korea	Rebeka Koha; Latvia
53 kg	Rattanaphon Pakkaratha; Thailand	Jong Chun-hui; North Korea	Nouha Landoulsi; Tunisia
58 kg	Chiang Nien-hsin; Chinese Taipei	Anastasia Petrova; Russia	Sasha Nievas; Argentina
63 kg	Sara Ahmed; Egypt	Ana Lilia Durán; Mexico	Sofiya Zenchenko; Ukraine
+63 kg	Dunganksorn Chaidee; Thailand	Svetlana Shcherbakova; Russia	Tatyana Kapustina; Kazakhstan
