= 2014 in weightlifting =

This article lists the main weightlifting events and their results for 2014.

== 2014 Summer Youth Olympics ==
- August 17 – 23: 2014 Summer Youth Olympics
  - Armenia, China, and Thailand won 2 gold medals each. However, Russia won the overall medal tally.

== World & Grand Prix weightlifting championships ==
- June 20 – 28: 2014 Junior World Weightlifting Championships in Kazan
  - Host nation, Russia, won both the gold and overall medal tallies, for men and women overall results.
- September 6 – ?: 2014 IWF Grand Prix - President's Cup in (Russia) Noyabrsk
  - Men's 94 kg winner: (Russia) Egor Klimonov
  - Men's 105 kg winner: (Latvia) Artūrs Plēsnieks
  - Men's +105 kg winner: (Russia) Antoniy Savchuk
  - Women's 75 kg winner: (China) XIE Hongli
  - Women's +75 kg winner: (Egypt) Shaimaa Khalaf
- November 8 – 16: 2014 World Weightlifting Championships in (Kazakhstan) Almaty
  - China and North Korea won 4 gold medals each in the Big category. China won the overall medal tally in the same category.
  - North Korea won the gold medal tally in the Big and Small category. China won the overall medal tally in the same category.
  - China won the team rankings for the men and women events.
- December 5 – ?: 2014 FISU World University Weightlifting Championships in Chiang Mai
  - Thailand won both the gold and overall medal tallies.

== Continental and regional weightlifting championships ==
- March 4 – ?: 2014 Asian Junior Weightlifting Championships in Bangsaen
  - China won the gold medal tally. Thailand won the overall medal tally.
- March 31 – ?: 2014 Pan American Junior Weightlifting Championships in (United States) Reno
  - Colombia won the gold medal tally. Mexico won the overall medal tally.
- April 5 – 12: 2014 European Weightlifting Championships in (Israel) Tel Aviv
  - Russia won both the gold and overall medal tallies, in both "Big" and "Small" categories.
- April 15 – ?: 2014 African Junior & Youth Weightlifting Championships in Tunis
  - Junior: Tunisia won both the gold and overall medal tallies.
  - Youth: Tunisia won both the gold and overall medal tallies.
- April 28 – ?: 2014 European Youth Weightlifting Championships in (Poland) Ciechanów
  - Russia won the gold medal tally. Russia, Turkey, & Romania won 7 overall medals each.
- May 7 – ?: 2014 Pan American & South American Youth Weightlifting Championships in Lima
  - Pan American: Ecuador won the gold medal tally. Mexico won the overall medal tally.
  - South American: Ecuador won the gold medal tally. Ecuador & Peru won 13 overall medals each.
- May 25 – ?: 2014 Oceanian Senior, Junior & Youth Weightlifting Championships in (France) / (New Caledonia) Le Mont-Dore
  - Senior: Papua New Guinea and Samoa won 3 gold medals each. New Zealand won the overall medal tally.
  - Junior: Papua New Guinea won the gold medal tally. Australia won the overall medal tally.
  - Youth: Australia & New Zealand won 4 gold medals each. Australia won the overall medal tally.
- May 25 – ?: 2014 South Pacific Senior, Junior, & Youth Weightlifting Championships in (France) / (New Caledonia) Le Mont-Dore
  - Senior: Samoa won the gold medal tally. Papua New Guinea won the overall medal tally.
  - Junior: Papua New Guinea and Niue won 3 gold medals each. Papua New Guinea won the overall medal tally.
  - Youth: Fiji won the gold medal tally. Papua New Guinea won the overall medal tally.
- May 26 – June 2: 2014 Pan American Weightlifting Championships in Santo Domingo
  - Men: Colombia won the gold medal tally, in the "Small" category. Cuba won the overall medal tally, in the "Small" category. Colombia and Cuba won 3 gold medals each, in the "Big" category. Cuba won the overall medal tally, in the "Big" category.
  - Women: Colombia won both the gold and overall medal tallies, in the "Small" category. Colombia won the gold medal tally, in the "Big" category. Colombia, Dominican Republic, and Mexico won the overall medal tally, in the "Big" category, with 4 medals each.
- November 18 – ?: 2014 Afro-Asian Weightlifting Championships in (Uzbekistan) Tashkent
  - China won both the gold and overall medal tallies.
- November 21 – ?: 2014 European Junior Weightlifting Championships in (Cyprus) Limassol
  - Russia won both the gold and overall medal tallies.
