= Weightlifting at the 2014 Summer Youth Olympics – Girls' 53 kg =

Girl's 53 kg at the II Summer Youth Olympic Games
- Venue: Nanjing International Expo Center
- Dates: August 18, 2014
- Competitors: 8 from 8 nations
- Winning total weight: 190kg

Medalists
1st place, gold medalist(s)		Rattanaphon Pakkaratha	Thailand
2nd place, silver medalist(s)		Jong Chun-hui	North Korea
3rd place, bronze medalist(s)		Nouha Landoulsi	Tunisia

The girls' 53 kg weightlifting event was the second women's event at the weightlifting competition at the 2014 Summer Youth Olympics, with competitors limited to a maximum of 53 kilograms of body mass.

Each lifter performed in both the snatch and clean and jerk lifts, with the final score being the sum of the lifter's best result in each. The athlete received three attempts in each of the two lifts; the score for the lift was the heaviest weight successfully lifted.

== Results ==
Rank	Name	Body Weight	Snatch (kg)				Clean & Jerk (kg)				Total (kg)
Rank	Name	Body Weight	1	2	3	Res	1	2	3	Res	Total (kg)
1st place, gold medalist(s)	Rattanaphon Pakkaratha (THA)	52.74	75	79	81	81	101	106	109	109	190
2nd place, silver medalist(s)	Jong Chun-hui (PRK)	52.44	77	81	~~82~~	81	95	100	~~105~~	100	181
3rd place, bronze medalist(s)	Nouha Landoulsi (TUN)	52.24	75	~~78~~	79	79	~~96~~	96	~~99~~	96	175
4	Yorlis Zabala (VEN)	52.54	75	80	~~82~~	80	95	~~97~~	~~97~~	95	175
5	Janeth Gómez (MEX)	52.37	~~70~~	70	75	75	90	~~95~~	95	95	170
6	Viorica Grigoraş (ROU)	52.94	65	68	70	70	83	~~87~~	~~87~~	83	153
7	Ulina Sagone (FIJ)	52.52	55	58	~~61~~	58	68	~~72~~	~~72~~	68	126
8	Nicole Gatt (MLT)	52.49	~~48~~	48	~~51~~	48	63	~~67~~	71	71	119
