= North Korea at the 2014 Summer Youth Olympics =

- IOC code: PRK
- NOC: Olympic Committee of the Democratic People's Republic of Korea

in Nanjing
- Competitors: 6 in 3 sports
- Medals Ranked 20th: Gold 3 Silver 2 Bronze 0 Total 5

Summer Youth Olympics appearances
- 2010; 2014; 2018

North Korea competed at the 2014 Summer Youth Olympics, in Nanjing, China from 16 August to 28 August 2014.

== Medalists ==
Medal	Name	Sport	Event	Date
Gold	Pak Jong-ju	Weightlifting	Boys' −62 kg	18 August
Gold	Ri Seung	Wrestling	Boys' Greco-Roman -42kg	25 August
Gold	Kim Son-hyang	Wrestling	Girls' Freestyle -46kg	26 August
Silver	Ri Song-gum	Weightlifting	Girls' −48 kg	17 August
Silver	Jong Chun-hui	Weightlifting	Girls' −53 kg	18 August

== Rowing ==
North Korea qualified one boat based on its performance at the Asian Qualification Regatta.

Athlete	Event	Heats		Repechage		Semifinals		Final	
Athlete	Event	Time	Rank	Time	Rank	Time	Rank	Time	Rank
Choe Ryong-hyok	Boys' Single Sculls	3:53.70	6 R	3:40.60	5 SC/D	DNF	FD	DNS	24

Qualification Legend: FA=Final A (medal); FB=Final B (non-medal); FC=Final C (non-medal); FD=Final D (non-medal); SA/B=Semifinals A/B; SC/D=Semifinals C/D; R=Repechage

== Weightlifting ==
North Korea qualified 1 quota in the boys' events and 2 quotas in the girls' events based on the team ranking after the 2013 Weightlifting Youth World Championships.

Boys

Athlete	Event	Snatch		Clean & jerk		Total	Rank
Athlete	Event	Result	Rank	Result	Rank	Total	Rank
Pak Jong-ju	−62 kg	120	1	143	2	263	1st place, gold medalist(s)

Girls

Athlete	Event	Snatch		Clean & jerk		Total	Rank
Athlete	Event	Result	Rank	Result	Rank	Total	Rank
Ri Song-gum	−48 kg	72	3	93	2	165	2nd place, silver medalist(s)
Jong Chun-hui	−53 kg	81	1	100	2	181	2nd place, silver medalist(s)

== Wrestling ==
North Korea qualified two athletes based on its performance at the 2014 Asian Cadet Championships.

Key:

- VT - Victory by Fall.
- PP - Decision by Points - the loser with technical points.
- PO - Decision by Points - the loser without technical points.

Boys

Athlete	Event	Group stage			Final / RM	Rank
Athlete	Event	Opposition Score	Opposition Score	Rank	Opposition Score	Rank
Ri Seung	Greco-Roman -42kg	R Isoev (TJK); W 4 – 0 ^{ST}	E Perez (MEX); W 4 – 0 ^{ST}	1 Q	F Aslan (TUR); W 3 – 1 ^{PP}	1st place, gold medalist(s)

Girls

Athlete	Event	Group stage			Final / RM	Rank
Athlete	Event	Opposition Score	Opposition Score	Rank	Opposition Score	Rank
Kim Son-hyang	Freestyle -46kg	M Bramley (NZL); W 4 – 0	T Doncila (MDA); W 3 – 1	1 Q	D Bolormaa (MGL); W 3 – 1 ^{PP}	1st place, gold medalist(s)
