= Wrestling at the 2014 Summer Youth Olympics =

Wrestling at the II Summer Youth Olympic Games
- Venue: Longjiang Gymnasium
- Dates: 25–27 August

Wrestling at the 2014 Summer Youth Olympics was held from 25 to 27 August at the Longjiang Gymnasium in Nanjing, China.

== Qualification ==
Each National Olympic Committee (NOC) can enter a maximum of 5 competitors, 2 in Boys' Freestyle, 2 in Boys' Greco-Roman and 1 in Girls' Freestyle. 98 athletes, 70 male and 28 female qualified over five continental qualification tournament. Each continent qualified 1 athlete in each event while the Americas in Boys' Freestyle, Asia in Boys' Greco-Roman and Girls' Freestyle and Europe in all three qualified a second athlete in each event. Despite being hosts, China was not given any quotas and had to qualify normally. A further 14, 10 male and 4 female athletes was decided by the Tripartite Commission.

To be eligible to participate at the Youth Olympics athletes must have been born between 1 January 1997 and 31 December 1998.

=== Qualification Timeline ===
Event	Location	Date
2014 Oceania Cadet Championships	(American Samoa) Pago Pago	19–22 March 2014
2014 Pan America Cadet Championships	(Brazil) Recife	2–4 May 2014
2014 Europe Cadet Championships	(Bulgaria) Samokov	6–11 May 2014
2014 Asia Cadet Championships	(Thailand) Bangkok	8–11 May 2014
2014 Africa Cadet Championships	(Egypt) Alexandria	19–20 May 2014

=== Qualification Summary ===
NOC	Boys' Freestyle					Boys' Greco-Roman					Girls' Freestyle				Total
NOC	-46 kg	-54 kg	-63 kg	-76 kg	-100 kg	-42 kg	-50 kg	-58 kg	-69 kg	-85 kg	-46 kg	-52 kg	-60 kg	-70 kg	Total
Algeria						X	X				X				3
Argentina								X							1
Armenia		X		X				X							3
American Samoa	X			X		X				X					4
Australia					X										1
Azerbaijan			X		X		X		X			X			5
Belarus											X				1
Brazil					X		X								2
Bulgaria										X					1
Cambodia												X			1
Canada			X	X						X		X			4
China													X		1
Republic of the Congo													X		1
Colombia	X			X									X		3
Dominican Republic								X							1
Ecuador														X	1
Egypt	X				X				X	X		X			5
El Salvador												X			1
France													X		1
Georgia			X	X											2
Germany									X						2
Guam													X		1
Honduras				X											1
India	X		X							X			X		4
Iran							X	X							2
Ivory Coast														X	1
Japan				X								X			2
Kazakhstan		X						X	X					X	4
North Korea						X					X				1
South Korea														X	1
Macedonia		X													1
Marshall Islands							X							X	2
Mexico					X	X									2
Moldova					X		X				X				3
Mongolia											X				1
Nicaragua	X														1
Nigeria											X				1
New Zealand		X	X					X	X		X				5
Norway													X		1
Palau			X												1
Peru									X						1
Poland														X	1
Russia	X	X						X		X				X	5
Serbia										X					1
South Africa		X	X										X		3
Tajikistan					X	X				X					3
Tunisia				X				X							2
Turkey	X					X	X							X	3
Turkmenistan					X										1
Ukraine						X						X			2
United States	X	X							X						3
Uzbekistan							X		X			X			3
Venezuela		X	X								X				3
Yemen		X													1
54 NOCs	8	9	8	8	8	7	8	8	8	8	8	8	8	8	112

== Schedule ==
The schedule was released by the Nanjing Youth Olympic Games Organizing Committee.

All times are CST (UTC+8)

Event date	Event day	Starting time	Event details
25 August	Monday	10:00	Boys' Greco-Roman: Group Stage
25 August	Monday	17:00	Boys' Greco-Roman: Group Stage; Boys' Greco-Roman: Ranking Matches
26 August	Tuesday	10:00	Girls' Freestyle: Group Stage
26 August	Tuesday	17:00	Girls' Freestyle: Group Stage; Girls' Freestyle: Ranking Matches
27 August	Wednesday	10:00	Boys' Freestyle: Group Stage
27 August	Wednesday	17:00	Boys' Freestyle: Group Stage; Boys' Freestyle: Ranking Matches

== Medal summary ==
=== Medal table ===
* Host nation (China)

Rank	Nation	Gold	Silver	Bronze	Total
1	Russia	4	0	0	4
2	Azerbaijan	3	2	0	5
3	Japan	2	0	0	2
3	North Korea	2	0	0	2
5	Kazakhstan	1	0	1	2
6	Norway	1	0	0	1
6	Uzbekistan	1	0	0	1
8	United States	0	3	0	3
9	Turkey	0	2	1	3
10	Armenia	0	1	2	3
11	Georgia	0	1	1	2
11	Moldova	0	1	1	2
13	Bulgaria	0	1	0	1
13	China*	0	1	0	1
13	Mongolia	0	1	0	1
13	Venezuela	0	1	0	1
17	Egypt	0	0	2	2
17	Iran	0	0	2	2
17	Ukraine	0	0	2	2
20	France	0	0	1	1
20	Poland	0	0	1	1
Totals (21 entries)		14	14	14	42

=== Boy's events ===
==== Freestyle ====
Event	Gold	Silver	Bronze
46 kg	Ismail Gadzhiev; Russia	Cade Olivas; United States	Cabbar Duyum; Turkey
54 kg	Mukhamed Kuatbek; Kazakhstan	Daton Fix; United States	Vaginak Matevosyan; Armenia
63 kg	Teymur Mammadov; Azerbaijan	Anthony Montero; Venezuela	Iveriko Julakidze; Georgia
76 kg	Yajyuro Yamasaki; Japan	Meki Simonia; Georgia	Sargis Hovsepyan; Armenia
100 kg	Igbal Hajizada; Azerbaijan	Dmitri Ceacusta; Moldova	Hatem Abdallah; Egypt

==== Greco-Roman ====
Event	Gold	Silver	Bronze
42 kg	Ri Se-ung; North Korea	Fatih Aslan; Turkey	Aleksey Masyk; Ukraine
50 kg	Ilkhom Bakhromov; Uzbekistan	Jabbar Najafov; Azerbaijan	Mohammad Reza Aghania; Iran
58 kg	Arslan Zubairov; Russia	Zaven Mikaelyan; Armenia	Keramat Abdevali; Iran
69 kg	Islambek Dadov; Azerbaijan	Mason Manville; United States	Evgeni Polivadov; Kazakhstan
85 kg	Mark Bemalian; Russia	Kiril Milov; Bulgaria	Ahmed Ahmed; Egypt

=== Girl's events ===
==== Freestyle ====
Event	Gold	Silver	Bronze
46 kg	Kim Son-hyang; North Korea	Mönkhboldyn Dölgöön; Mongolia	Tatiana Doncila; Moldova
52 kg	Mayu Mukaida; Japan	Leyla Gurbanova; Azerbaijan	Olena Kremzer; Ukraine
60 kg	Grace Bullen; Norway	Pei Xingru; China	Koumba Larroque; France
70 kg	Daria Shisterova; Russia	Tuğba Kılıç; Turkey	Natalia Strzałka; Poland
