= Taekwondo at the 2014 Summer Youth Olympics – Girls' 44 kg =

Taekwondo competition

Girls' Taekwondo 44kg at the II Summer Youth Olympic Games
- Venue: Nanjing International Expo Center
- Date: 17 August
- Competitors: 9 from 9 nations

Medalists
1st place, gold medalist(s)		Panipak Wongpattanakit	Thailand
2nd place, silver medalist(s)		Ceren Ozbek	Azerbaijan
3rd place, bronze medalist(s)		Abigail Stones	Great Britain
3rd place, bronze medalist(s)		Chen Zih-Ting	Chinese Taipei

The girls' 44 kg competition in taekwondo at the 2014 Summer Youth Olympics in Nanjing took place on August 17. A total of 9 women competed in this event, limited to fighters whose body weight was less than 44 kilograms. Preliminaries started at 14:00 and finals at 19:00. Two bronze medals were awarded at the Taekwondo competitions.

== Results ==
Legend

- PTG – Won by points gap
- SUD – Won by sudden death (golden point)
- SUP – Won by superiority

=== Main bracket ===
Preliminary round
Panipak Wongpattanakit (THA)	12 (PTG)
Thuy Nguyen Thi Thu (VIE)	0

Quarterfinals
Farahnaz Yaqubi (AFG)	0
Panipak Wongpattanakit (THA)	19
Chen Zih-Ting (TPE)	6
Giuliana Federici (GER)	3
Abigail Stones (GBR)	5
Eman Aladaileh (JOR)	2
Brenda Lúa (MEX)	0
Ceren Ozbek (AZE)	0 (SUP)

Semifinals
Panipak Wongpattanakit (THA)	8
Chen Zih-Ting (TPE)	1
Abigail Stones (GBR)	2
Ceren Ozbek (AZE)	3

Gold medal match
Panipak Wongpattanakit (THA)	21
Ceren Ozbek (AZE)	1
