= Vietnam at the 2014 Summer Youth Olympics =

- IOC code: VIE
- NOC: Vietnam Olympic Committee

in Nanjing
- Competitors: 13 in 7 sports
- Medals Ranked 44th: Gold 1 Silver 1 Bronze 0 Total 2

Summer Youth Olympics appearances
- 2010; 2014; 2018

Vietnam competed at the 2014 Summer Youth Olympics, in Nanjing, China from 16 August to 28 August 2014.

== Medalists ==
Medal	Name	Sport	Event	Date
Gold	Nguyen Thi Anh Vien	Swimming	Girls' 200 metre individual medley	17 Aug
Silver	Nguyen Tran Anh Tuan	Weightlifting	Men's 56kg	17 Aug

== Badminton ==
Vietnam qualified one athlete based on the 2 May 2014 BWF Junior World Rankings.

Singles

Athlete	Event	Group stage				Quarterfinal	Semifinal	Final / BM	Rank
Athlete	Event	Opposition Score	Opposition Score	Opposition Score	Rank	Opposition Score	Opposition Score	Opposition Score	Rank
Cao Cuong Pham	Boys' Singles	Sarsekenov (UKR); W 2-0	Petrovic (SRB); W 2-0	Joshi (IND); L 0-2	2	did not advance			

Doubles

Athlete	Event	Group stage				Quarterfinal	Semifinal	Final / BM	Rank
Athlete	Event	Opposition Score	Opposition Score	Opposition Score	Rank	Opposition Score	Opposition Score	Opposition Score	Rank
Aliye Demirbag (TUR); Cao Cuong Pham (VIE)	Mixed Doubles	Lu (TPE); Lee (MAS); L 1-2	Garrido (MEX); Kuuba (EST); L 1-2	Petrovic (SRB); Liang (SIN); W 2-1	4	did not advance			

== Beach Volleyball ==
Vietnam qualified a girls' team by their performance at the AVC Qualification Tournament.

Athletes	Event	Preliminary round	Standing	Round of 24	Round of 16	Quarterfinals	Semifinals	Final / BM	Rank
Athletes	Event	Opposition Score	Standing	Opposition Score	Opposition Score	Opposition Score	Opposition Score	Opposition Score	Rank
Thi Bich Vi Le; Thu Thu Van Tu	Girls'	Adamcikova/Valkova (CZE)	5	did not advance					
Thi Bich Vi Le; Thu Thu Van Tu	Girls'	Conteh/Turay (SLE); W w/o	5	did not advance					
Thi Bich Vi Le; Thu Thu Van Tu	Girls'	Ramos/Lisboa (BRA)	5	did not advance					
Thi Bich Vi Le; Thu Thu Van Tu	Girls'	Caputo/Muno (USA); L 0 - 2	5	did not advance					
Thi Bich Vi Le; Thu Thu Van Tu	Girls'	Gerson/Rohrer (SUI)	5	did not advance					

== Gymnastics ==
=== Artistic Gymnastics ===
Vietnam qualified one athlete based on its performance at the 2014 Asian Artistic Gymnastics Championships.

Boys

Athlete	Event	Apparatus						Total	Rank
Athlete	Event	F	PH	R	V	PB	HB	Total	Rank
Dinh Vuong Tran	Qualification	12.400	10.800	12.800	12.550	11.675	12.200	72.425	34

== Rowing ==
Vietnam qualified one boat based on its performance at the Asian Qualification Regatta.

Athlete	Event	Heats		Repechage		Semifinals		Final	
Athlete	Event	Time	Rank	Time	Rank	Time	Rank	Time	Rank
Hao Cao Thi	Girls' Single Sculls	4:09.55	4 R	4:05.59	4 SC/D	4:06.74	4 FD	4:07.46	20

Qualification Legend: FA=Final A (medal); FB=Final B (non-medal); FC=Final C (non-medal); FD=Final D (non-medal); SA/B=Semifinals A/B; SC/D=Semifinals C/D; R=Repechage

== Swimming ==
Athlete	Event	Heat		Semifinal		Final	
Athlete	Event	Time	Rank	Time	Rank	Time	Rank
Tran Duy Khoi	50 m backstroke	26.73	16 Q	26.71	15	did not advance	
Tran Duy Khoi	100 m backstroke	57.80	24	did not advance			
Tran Duy Khoi	200 m backstroke	2:05.50	16	—		did not advance	
Tran Duy Khoi	200 m individual medley	2:04.56	8 Q	—		2:03.69	6
Huynh The Vi	200 m breaststroke	2:21.45	19	—		did not advance	

Girls

Athlete	Event	Heat		Semifinal		Final	
Athlete	Event	Time	Rank	Time	Rank	Time	Rank
Nguyen Thi Anh Vien	200 m freestyle	—					
Nguyen Thi Anh Vien	400 m freestyle	4:16.65	13	—		did not advance	
Nguyen Thi Anh Vien	800 m freestyle	—				8:41.13	4
Nguyen Thi Anh Vien	50 m backstroke	29.54	11 Q	29.57	12	did not advance	
Nguyen Thi Anh Vien	100 m backstroke	—					
Nguyen Thi Anh Vien	200 m backstroke	DNS		—		did not advance	
Nguyen Thi Anh Vien	100 m butterfly	—					
Nguyen Thi Anh Vien	200 m butterfly	2:13.90	9	—		did not advance	
Nguyen Thi Anh Vien	200 m individual medley	2:16.02	6 Q	—		2:12.66	1st place, gold medalist(s)
Le Thi My Thao	200 m butterfly	2:19.12	22	—		did not advance	

== Taekwondo ==
Vietnam qualified one athlete based on its performance at the Taekwondo Qualification Tournament.

Girls

Athlete	Event	Round of 16	Quarterfinals	Semifinals	Final	Rank
Athlete	Event	Opposition Result	Opposition Result	Opposition Result	Opposition Result	Rank
Nguyen Thi Thu Thuy	−44 kg	Panipak Wongpattanakit (THA); L 0–12	did not advance			

== Weightlifting ==
Vietnam qualified 1 quota in the boys' events and 2 quotas in the girls' events based on the team ranking after the 2013 Weightlifting Youth World Championships.

Boys

Athlete	Event	Snatch		Clean & jerk		Total	Rank
Athlete	Event	Result	Rank	Result	Rank	Total	Rank
Nguyen Tran Anh Tuan	−56 kg	108	3	135	2	243	2nd place, silver medalist(s)

Girls

Athlete	Event	Snatch		Clean & jerk		Total	Rank
Athlete	Event	Result	Rank	Result	Rank	Total	Rank
Ngo Thi Quyen	−48 kg	65	4	84	6	149	5
Nguyen Thi Van	+63 kg	86	9	111	6	197	8
