= Weightlifting at the 2014 Summer Youth Olympics – Boys' +85 kg =

Boys' +85 at the II Summer Youth Olympic Games
- Venue: Nanjing International Expo Center
- Dates: August 23, 2014
- Competitors: 8 from 8 nations
- Winning total weight: 391kg

Medalists
1st place, gold medalist(s)		Simon Martirosyan	Armenia
2nd place, silver medalist(s)		Tamaš Kajdoči	Serbia
3rd place, bronze medalist(s)		Anthony Coullet	France

The boys' +85 kg weightlifting event was the second men's event at the weightlifting competition at the 2014 Summer Youth Olympics, with competitors with at least 85 kg, there was no maximum limit.

Each lifter performed in both the snatch and clean and jerk lifts, with the final score being the sum of the lifter's best result in each. The athlete received three attempts in each of the two lifts; the score for the lift was the heaviest weight successfully lifted.

== Results ==
Rank	Name	Body Weight	Snatch (kg)				Clean & Jerk (kg)				Total (kg)
Rank	Name	Body Weight	1	2	3	Res	1	2	3	Res	Total (kg)
1st place, gold medalist(s)	Simon Martirosyan (ARM)	110.98	170	~~183~~	~~185~~	170	192	205	221	221	391
2nd place, silver medalist(s)	Tamaš Kajdoči (SRB)	120.54	145	150	~~156~~	150	182	186	~~191~~	186	336
3rd place, bronze medalist(s)	Anthony Coullet (FRA)	132.68	135	139	142	142	~~181~~	181	185	185	327
4	Saeid Rezazadeh (IRI)	114.85	133	137	140	140	180	183	~~187~~	183	323
5	Raúl Manríquez (MEX)	166.39	125	130	~~135~~	130	165	172	175	175	305
6	Aymen Touairi (ALG)	91.55	~~132~~	~~133~~	133	133	160	167	171	171	304
7	Yevgeniy Fesak (UKR)	94.73	~~130~~	130	~~134~~	130	165	171	~~175~~	171	301
	Ryan Sennett (USA)	130.77	~~140~~	~~140~~	~~140~~	–	–	–	–	–	–
