= Iran at the 2014 Summer Youth Olympics =

- IOC code: IRI
- NOC: National Olympic Committee of the Islamic Republic of Iran

in Nanjing
- Competitors: 16 in 9 sports
- Flag bearer: Kimia Alizadeh
- Medals Ranked 24th: Gold 3 Silver 0 Bronze 3 Total 6

Summer Youth Olympics appearances (overview)
- 2010; 2014; 2018

Iran competed at the 2014 Summer Youth Olympics, in Nanjing, China from 16 August to 28 August 2014.

== Competitors ==
Sport	Boys	Girls	Total
Athletics	3		3
Beach volleyball	2		2
Equestrian	1		1
Judo	1		1
Shooting		1	1
Swimming	1		1
Taekwondo	2	1	3
Weightlifting	2		2
Wrestling	2		2
Total	14	2	16

== Medal summary ==
=== Medals by sport ===
Sport	Gold	Silver	Bronze	Total
Judo	1			1
Taekwondo	2		1	3
Wrestling			2	2
Total	3	0	3	6

=== Medalists ===
Medal	Name	Sport	Event
Gold	Ramin Safavieh	Judo	Boys' 100 kg
Gold	Mehdi Eshaghi	Taekwondo	Boys' 48 kg
Gold	Kimia Alizadeh	Taekwondo	Girls' 63 kg
Bronze	Danial Salehimehr	Taekwondo	Boys' 73 kg
Bronze	Mohammad Reza Aghania	Wrestling	Boys' Greco-Roman 50 kg
Bronze	Keramat Abdevali	Wrestling	Boys' Greco-Roman 58 kg

== Results by event ==
=== Aquatics ===
==== Swimming ====
Athlete	Event	Heats		Semifinals		Final	
Athlete	Event	Time	Rank	Time	Rank	Time	Rank
Raham Peiravani	Boys' 100 m backstroke	58.96	32	Did not advance			
Raham Peiravani	Boys' 200 m backstroke	2:06.81	22	—N/a		Did not advance	

=== Athletics ===
Boys

Athlete	Event	Qualification		Final		Rank
Athlete	Event	Result	Rank	Result	Rank	Rank
Mohammad Reza Rahmani	400 m	50.37	18 QC	49.80	1	15
Javad Shouryabi	400 m hurdles	53.32	11 QB	52.31	1	9
Arian Zarekani	High jump	2.03	10 QB	2.05	3	11

Mixed

Athlete	Event	Qualification		Final		Rank
Athlete	Event	Result	Rank	Result	Rank	Rank
Dorsett (BAH); Ferdani (ITA); Hoka (SOL); Barhoum (SYR); Chemusto (UGA); Babayev (AZE); Cheng (CHN); Arévalo (ECU); Prüfer (GER); Rahmani (IRI)	8×100 m relay	1:46.29	22	did not advance		22
Soleyn (ANT); Niyomwungere (BDI); Mustafić (CRO); Daci (FRA); Burns (MHL); Thompson (BAR); Balabanov (BUL); Ali (EGY); Shouryabi (IRI) van Rooyen (RSA)	8×100 m relay	1:52.31	44	did not advance		44
Levaggi (ARG); Ndarata (CAF); Radajeva (EST); Rodney (GRN); Fernandes (POR); Ćuković (BIH); Thanasis (GRE); Zarekani (IRI); Al-Mutairi (KUW) van Assen (SUR)	8×100 m relay	1:45.98	21	did not advance		21

=== Beach volleyball ===
Athlete	Event	Preliminary round						Round of 32	Round of 16	Quarterfinal	Semifinal	Final	Rank
Athlete	Event	Round 1	Round 2	Round 3	Round 4	Round 5	Rank	Round of 32	Round of 16	Quarterfinal	Semifinal	Final	Rank
Keivan Sahneh; Mohammad Reza Shobeiri	Boys	Figueroa and Rivera (PUR); L 0–2 (13–21, 11–21)	Bramont and Heredia (PER); L 1–2 (18–21, 23–21, 16–18)	Gauthier-Rat and Loiseau (FRA); L 0–2 (7–21, 15–21)	Rosa and Sweeney (ISV); W 2–0 (21–6, 21–12)	Amissah and Tetteh (GHA); L RET (21–17, 22–24, 8–14)	5	Did not advance					25

=== Equestrian ===
Jumping

Athlete	Horse	Event	Round 1	Round 2	Total	Rank
Saeid Kalantari	Cristallo	Individual	4	21	25	23
Hunter (AUS); Chiang (HKG); Fraser (NZL); Mathavan (MAS); Kalantari (IRI)	For The Star; DJ; Exilio; Arkansas; Cristallo	Team	12	8	20	5

=== Judo ===
Athlete	Event	Semifinal	Final	Rank
Ramin Safavieh	Boys' 100 kg	Schönefeldt (GER); W 000–000	Dashkov (KGZ); W 100–000	1st place, gold medalist(s)

=== Shooting ===
Girls

Athlete	Event	Qualification		Final	
Athlete	Event	Score	Rank	Score	Rank
Najmeh Khedmati	10 m air rifle	416.3	2 Q	163.9	4

Mixed

Athlete	Event	Qualification		Round of 16	Quarterfinal	Semifinal	Final	Rank
Athlete	Event	Score	Rank	Round of 16	Quarterfinal	Semifinal	Final	Rank
Friman (FIN); Khedmati (IRI)	10 m air rifle team	821.4	5 Q	Prashant (IND); Angirmaa (MGL); L 7–10	Did not advance			10

=== Taekwondo ===
Athlete	Event	Round of 16	Quarterfinal	Semifinal	Final	Rank
Mehdi Eshaghi	Boys' 48 kg	Bye	Hanprab (THA); W 20–12	Audibert (FRA); W 16–0	Wang (TPE); W 17–9	1st place, gold medalist(s)
Danial Salehimehr	Boys' 73 kg	—N/a	Saint-Jean (CAN); W 10–5	Adnan-Karim (GER); L 9–14	Did not advance	3rd place, bronze medalist(s)
Kimia Alizadeh	Girls' 63 kg	Ngassa (CMR); W RSC (23–0)	Pannemans (BEL); W 15–2	Yopasa (COL); W 12–2	Turutina (RUS); W 10–7	1st place, gold medalist(s)

=== Weightlifting ===
Athlete	Event	Snatch		Clean & Jerk		Total	
Athlete	Event	Result	Rank	Result	Rank	Result	Rank
Reza Beiranvand	Boys' 85 kg	144	3	173	4	317	4
Saeid Rezazadeh	Boys' +85 kg	140	4	183	4	323	4

=== Wrestling ===
Greco-Roman

Athlete	Event	Group round				Final	Rank
Athlete	Event	Round 1	Round 2	Round 3	Rank	Final	Rank
Mohammad Reza Aghania	Boys' 50 kg	Cojocari (MDA); W Fall (10–0)	Najafov (AZE); L 5–9	Beytekin (TUR); W 12–4	2 QB	3rd place match Bounasri (ALG); W 7–0	3rd place, bronze medalist(s)
Keramat Abdevali	Boys' 58 kg	Downes (NZL); W 8–0	Zubairov (RUS); L 0–9	Kurmanali (KAZ); W 4–2	2 QB	3rd place match Destribats (ARG); W 4–2	3rd place, bronze medalist(s)
