= Weightlifting at the 2014 Summer Youth Olympics – Girls' 48 kg =

Girl's 48kg events at the Olympics

Girl's 48kg at the II Summer Youth Olympic Games
- Venue: Nanjing International Expo Center
- Dates: August 17, 2014
- Competitors: 11 from 11 nations
- Winning total weight: 193kg

Medalists
1st place, gold medalist(s)		Jiang Huihua	China
2nd place, silver medalist(s)		Ri Songgum	North Korea
3rd place, bronze medalist(s)		Rebeka Koha	Latvia

The girls' 48 kg weightlifting event was the first women's event at the weightlifting competition at the 2014 Summer Youth Olympics, with competitors limited to a maximum of 48 kilograms of body mass. The whole competition took place on August 17 at 14:30.

Each lifter performed in both the snatch and clean and jerk lifts, with the final score being the sum of the lifter's best result in each. The athlete received three attempts in each of the two lifts; the score for the lift was the heaviest weight successfully lifted.

== Results ==
Rank	Name	Body Weight	Snatch (kg)				Clean & Jerk (kg)				Total (kg)
Rank	Name	Body Weight	1	2	3	Res	1	2	3	Res	Total (kg)
1st place, gold medalist(s)	Jiang Huihua (CHN)	47.30	80	~~85~~	88	88	90	100	105	105	193
2nd place, silver medalist(s)	Ri Song-gum (PRK)	45.65	66	70	72	72	88	93	~~95~~	93	165
3rd place, bronze medalist(s)	Rebeka Koha (LAT)	47.57	71	73	75	75	86	90	~~94~~	90	165
4	Gamze Karakol (TUR)	46.77	61	63	65	65	80	83	85	85	150
5	Ngô Thị Quyên (VIE)	47.44	60	63	65	65	77	80	84	84	149
6	Oo Zin May (MYA)	47.64	~~60~~	60	63	63	80	85	~~88~~	85	148
7	Emily Figueiredo (BRA)	46.85	62	~~66~~	~~66~~	62	~~78~~	78	~~80~~	78	140
8	Fiorella Cueva (PER)	47.13	~~52~~	52	55	55	~~75~~	75	79	79	134
9	Alessandra Pagliaro (ITA)	43.41	58	61	~~64~~	61	68	~~72~~	72	72	133
10	Jahura Akter Reshma (BAN)	46.84	~~53~~	53	55	55	66	69	72	72	127
11	Bea Ovia (PNG)	47.85	48	51	~~54~~	51	63	~~68~~	~~68~~	63	114
