= Thailand at the 2014 Summer Youth Olympics =

- IOC code: THA
- NOC: National Olympic Committee of Thailand
- Website: www.olympicthai.or.th (in Thai and English)

in Nanjing
- Competitors: 37 in 13 sports
- Flag bearer: Vitsanu Phosri
- Medals Ranked 18th: Gold 3 Silver 2 Bronze 3 Total 8

Summer Youth Olympics appearances (overview)
- 2010; 2014; 2018; 2026

Thailand competed at the 2014 Summer Youth Olympics, in Nanjing, China from 16 August to 28 August 2014.

== Medalists ==
Medal	Name	Sport	Event	Date
Gold	Panipak Wongpattanakit	Taekwondo	Girls' 44 kg	17 Aug
Gold	Rattanaphon Pakkaratha	Weightlifting	Girls' 53 kg	18 Aug
Gold	Dunganksorn Chaidee	Weightlifting	Girls' +63 kg	22 Aug
Silver	Sakda Meeboon	Weightlifting	Boys' 62 kg	18 Aug
Silver	Sarisa Suwannachet	Swimming	Girls' 400 metre freestyle	20 Aug
Bronze	Danthai Boonma	Golf	Boys' individual	21 Aug
Bronze	Supamas Sangchan	Golf	Girls' individual	21 Aug
Bronze	Busanan Ongbumrungpan	Badminton	Girls' Single	22 Aug

== Athletics ==
Thailand qualified seven athletes.

Qualification Legend: Q=Final A (medal); qB=Final B (non-medal); qC=Final C (non-medal); qD=Final D (non-medal); qE=Final E (non-medal)

Boys
Track & road events

Athlete	Event	Heats		Final	
Athlete	Event	Result	Rank	Result	Rank
Naludol Asavaruengsri	200 m	22.21	16 qB	22.44	13
Vitsanu Phosri	400 m	48.96	12 qB	48.87	12
Parinya Munaek	110 m hurdles	13.78 PB	11 qB	13.93	10
Witthawat Thumcha	400 m hurdles	51.80	3 Q	52.50	5

Field Events

Athlete	Event	Qualification		Final	
Athlete	Event	Distance	Rank	Distance	Rank
Saran Saenbuakham	Long jump	NM	— qB	6.84	9
Chakkrit Panthasa	Triple jump	14.68	12 qB	14.86	9

Girls
Field events

Athlete	Event	Qualification		Final	
Athlete	Event	Distance	Rank	Distance	Rank
Pimpisa Songnoo	Discus throw	37.04 PB	14 qB	37.02	14

== Badminton ==
Thailand qualified two athletes based on the 2 May 2014 BWF Junior World Rankings.

Singles

Athlete	Event	Group stage				Quarterfinal	Semifinal	Final / BM	Rank
Athlete	Event	Opposition Score	Opposition Score	Opposition Score	Rank	Opposition Score	Opposition Score	Opposition Score	Rank
Mek Narongrit	Boys' Singles	Kurt (TUR); W 2–0	Wei (MAS); L 0–2	Dhami (NEP); W 2–0	2	did not advance			
Busanan Ongbumrungpan	Girls' Singles	Ishaak (SUR); W 2–0	Courtois (FRA); W 2–0	Chen (NED); W 2–0	1 Q	Ng (HKG); W 2–0	He (CHN); L 0–2	Lee (TPE); W 2–0	Bronze medal

Doubles

Athlete	Event	Group stage				Quarterfinal	Semifinal	Final / BM	Rank
Athlete	Event	Opposition Score	Opposition Score	Opposition Score	Rank	Opposition Score	Opposition Score	Opposition Score	Rank
Qin Jinjing (CHN); Mek Narongrit (THA)	Mixed Doubles	Cadeau (SEY)/ Penalver Pereira (ESP); W 2–0	Blichfeldt (DEN)/ Nzoussi (CGO); W 2– 0	Hartawan (INA)/ Guda (AUS); W 2–0	1 Q	Lais (AUT)/ Vlaar (NED); W 2–0	Cheam (MAS)/ Ng (HKG); L 0–2	Dias (SRI)/ He (CHN); L 0–2	4
Busanan Ongbumrungpan (THA); Dipesh Dhami (NEP)	Mixed Doubles	Azurmendi (ESP)/ Jakowczuk (POL); W 2–1	Konieczna (POL)/ Lee (HKG); L 1–2	Lee (TPE)/ Tsuneyama (JPN); L 0–2	3	did not advance			

== Basketball ==
Thailand qualified a girls' team based on the 1 June 2014 FIBA 3x3 National Federation Rankings.

=== Girls' tournament ===
Roster

- Amphawa Thumon
- Konrawee Phongkwan
- Rujiwan Bunsinprom
- Varitta Srijunvong

Group Stage

Pos	Team	Pld	W	D	L	PF	PA	PD	Pts	Qualification
1	United States	9	9	0	0	190	54	+136	27	Round of 16
2	Belgium	9	7	0	2	136	75	+61	21	Round of 16
3	Thailand	9	6	0	3	96	102	−6	18	Round of 16
4	Czech Republic	9	6	0	3	140	106	+34	18	Round of 16
5	Chinese Taipei	9	5	0	4	124	114	+10	15	Round of 16
6	Romania	9	5	0	4	118	102	+16	15	Round of 16
7	Egypt	9	4	0	5	125	127	−2	12	Round of 16
8	Guam	9	2	0	7	77	151	−74	6	Round of 16
9	Andorra	9	1	0	8	76	161	−85	3	Eliminated
10	Indonesia	9	0	0	9	66	156	−90	0	Eliminated

18 August 2014
19:00

Andorra	10–13	Thailand

Wutaishan Sports Center, Nanjing

19 August 2014
17:00

Thailand	10–14	Chinese Taipei

Wutaishan Sports Center, Nanjing

19 August 2014
21:00

Czech Republic	12–15	Thailand

Wutaishan Sports Center, Nanjing

20 August 2014
18:40

Thailand	5–21	United States

Wutaishan Sports Center, Nanjing

22 August 2014
17:00

Romania	16–4	Thailand

Wutaishan Sports Center, Nanjing

22 August 2014
20:20

Thailand	16–9	Indonesia

Wutaishan Sports Center, Nanjing

23 August 2014
18:40

Egypt	12–15	Thailand

Wutaishan Sports Center, Nanjing

24 August 2014
18:00

Guam	1–10	Thailand

Wutaishan Sports Center, Nanjing

24 August 2014
21:40

Thailand	8–7	Belgium

Wutaishan Sports Center, Nanjing

Round of 16

25 August 2014
17:00

Germany	9–5	Thailand

Wutaishan Sports Center, Nanjing

Knockout Stage

Round of 16	Quarterfinals	Semifinals	Final	Rank
Opposition Score	Opposition Score	Opposition Score	Opposition Score	Rank
Germany; L 5–9	did not advance			

=== Girls' Shoot-Out Contest ===
Skills Competition

Athlete	Event	Qualification			Final		
Athlete	Event	Points	Time	Rank	Points	Time	Rank
Amphawa Thumon	Girls' Shoot-out Contest	3	24.2	34	did not advance		
Konrawee Phongkwan	Girls' Shoot-out Contest	3	25.6	36	did not advance		
Rujiwan Bunsinprom	Girls' Shoot-out Contest	4	23.3	21	did not advance		
Varitta Srijunvong	Girls' Shoot-out Contest	0	33.0	60	did not advance		

== Beach Volleyball ==
Thailand qualified a boys' and girls' team by their performance at the AVC Qualification Tournament.

Athletes	Event	Preliminary round	Standing	Round of 24	Round of 16	Quarterfinals	Semifinals	Final / BM	Rank
Athletes	Event	Opposition Score	Standing	Opposition Score	Opposition Score	Opposition Score	Opposition Score	Opposition Score	Rank
Surin Jongklang; Banlue Nakprakhong	Boys'	Sousa (STP)/ Marques (STP); W 2–0	4	Moore (NZL)/ Robinson (NZL); W 2–0	Lucarelli (URU)/ Vieyto (URU); L 1–2	Did not advance			17
Surin Jongklang; Banlue Nakprakhong	Boys'	Richards (CAN)/ MacNeil (CAN); L 0–2	4	Moore (NZL)/ Robinson (NZL); W 2–0	Lucarelli (URU)/ Vieyto (URU); L 1–2	Did not advance			17
Surin Jongklang; Banlue Nakprakhong	Boys'	Kamara (SLE)/ Lombi (SLE); W 2–0	4	Moore (NZL)/ Robinson (NZL); W 2–0	Lucarelli (URU)/ Vieyto (URU); L 1–2	Did not advance			17
Surin Jongklang; Banlue Nakprakhong	Boys'	Kovalov (UKR)/ Plotnytskyi (UKR); W 2–1	4	Moore (NZL)/ Robinson (NZL); W 2–0	Lucarelli (URU)/ Vieyto (URU); L 1–2	Did not advance			17
Surin Jongklang; Banlue Nakprakhong	Boys'	Aulisi (ARG)/ Aveiro (ARG); L 0–2	4	Moore (NZL)/ Robinson (NZL); W 2–0	Lucarelli (URU)/ Vieyto (URU); L 1–2	Did not advance			17
Sirinuch Kawfong; Saowaros Tangkaeo	Girls'	Bobadilla (PAR)/ Valiente (PAR); L 0–2	4	Pan (TPE)/ Song (TPE); W 2–1	M McNamara (CAN)/ N McNamara (CAN); L 0–2	Did not advance			17
Sirinuch Kawfong; Saowaros Tangkaeo	Girls'	Douduwa (GHA)/ Essumang (GHA); W 2–0	4	Pan (TPE)/ Song (TPE); W 2–1	M McNamara (CAN)/ N McNamara (CAN); L 0–2	Did not advance			17
Sirinuch Kawfong; Saowaros Tangkaeo	Girls'	Bethancourt (GUA)/ Giron (GUA); W 2–0	4	Pan (TPE)/ Song (TPE); W 2–1	M McNamara (CAN)/ N McNamara (CAN); L 0–2	Did not advance			17
Sirinuch Kawfong; Saowaros Tangkaeo	Girls'	Gesslbauer (AUT)/ Radl (AUT); L 0–2	4	Pan (TPE)/ Song (TPE); W 2–1	M McNamara (CAN)/ N McNamara (CAN); L 0–2	Did not advance			17
Sirinuch Kawfong; Saowaros Tangkaeo	Girls'	Placette (FRA)/ Richard (FRA); L 1–2	4	Pan (TPE)/ Song (TPE); W 2–1	M McNamara (CAN)/ N McNamara (CAN); L 0–2	Did not advance			17

== Golf ==
Thailand qualified one team of two athletes based on the 8 June 2014 IGF Combined World Amateur Golf Rankings.

Individual

Athlete	Event	Round 1		Round 2			Round 3			Total	
Athlete	Event	Score	Rank	Score	Total	Rank	Score	Total	Rank	Score	Rank
Danthai Boonma	Boys	67	3	70	137	2	73	210	3	210	Bronze medal
Supamas Sangchan	Girls	73		66	139	2	70	209	3	209	Bronze medal

Team

Athletes	Event	Round 1 (Foursome)		Round 2 (Fourball)			Round 3 (Individual Stroke)				Total	
Athletes	Event	Score	Rank	Score	Total	Rank	Boy	Girl	Total	Rank	Score	Rank
Danthai Boonma; Supamas Sangchan	Mixed											

== Gymnastics ==
=== Artistic Gymnastics ===
Thailand qualified one athlete based on its performance at the 2014 Asian Artistic Gymnastics Championships.

Boys

Athlete	Event	Apparatus						Total	Rank
Athlete	Event	F	PH	R	V	PB	HB	Total	Rank
Nattipong Aeadwong	Qualification	13.200 17	13.000 15	12.000 29	13.950 17	11.400 31	11.050 36	74.600	24

== Sailing ==
Thailand qualified four boats based on its performance at the Byte CII Asian Continental Qualifiers and Techno 293 Asian Continental Qualifiers.

Athlete	Event	Race											Net Points	Final Rank
Athlete	Event	1	2	3	4	5	6	7	8	9	10	M*	Net Points	Final Rank
Apiwat Sringam	Boys' Byte CII	10	(13)	9	5	4	2	13	8	—	—	64	51	5
Thanatip Suebyubon	Boys' Techno 293	10	12	5	6	(13)	12	14	—	—	—	72	59	11
Nichaporn Panmuean	Girls' Byte CII	15	17	21	(22)	17	11	17	11	—	—	131	109	19
Duangkamon Phongern	Girls' Techno 293	1	12	2	(14)	14	2	3	—	—	—	48	34	5

== Shooting ==
Thailand qualified one shooter based on its performance at the 2014 Asian Shooting Championships.

Individual

Athlete	Event	Qualification		Final	
Athlete	Event	Points	Rank	Points	Rank
Jettakan Chokkaeo	Boys' 10m Air Pistol	563	9	did not advance	

Team

Athletes	Event	Qualification		Round of 16	Quarterfinals	Semifinals	Final / BM	Rank
Athletes	Event	Points	Rank	Opposition Result	Opposition Result	Opposition Result	Opposition Result	Rank
Jettakan Chokkaeo (THA); Marharyta Ramanchuk (BLR)	Mixed Team 10m Air Pistol							

== Swimming ==
Thailand qualified four swimmers.

Boys

Athlete	Event	Heat		Semifinal		Final	
Athlete	Event	Time	Rank	Time	Rank	Time	Rank
Tanakrit Kittiya	200 m freestyle	1:53.77	24	—N/a		Did not advance	
Tanakrit Kittiya	800 m freestyle	—N/a				8:34.26	24
Tanakrit Kittiya	200 m butterfly	DNS	—	—N/a		Did not advance	
Supakrid Pananuratana	50 m butterfly	25.16	19	Did not advance			
Supakrid Pananuratana	100 m butterfly	55.21	13 Q	54.91	13	Did not advance	

Girls

Athlete	Event	Heat		Final	
Athlete	Event	Time	Rank	Time	Rank
Sarisa Suwannachet	200 m freestyle	2:02.77	15	Did not advance	
Sarisa Suwannachet	400 m freestyle	4:14.65	6 Q	4:11.23	Silver medal
Sarisa Suwannachet	200 m butterfly	2:15.97	13	Did not advance	
Phiangkhwan Pawapotako	200 m breaststroke	2:35.43	16	Did not advance	
Phiangkhwan Pawapotako	200 m individual medley	2:18.98	11	Did not advance	

Mixed

Athlete	Event	Heat		Final	
Athlete	Event	Time	Rank	Time	Rank
Tanakrit Kittiya; Supakrid Pananuratana; Phiangkhwan Pawapotako; Sarisa Suwannachet	4 × 100 m freestyle relay	—N/a			
Tanakrit Kittiya; Supakrid Pananuratana; Phiangkhwan Pawapotako; Sarisa Suwannachet	4 × 100 m medley relay	—N/a			

== Table Tennis ==
Thailand qualified two athletes, Tamolwan Khetkhuan qualified by the ITTF Under-18 World Rankings and Padasak Tanviriyavechakul qualified as the winner of a Road to Nanjing tournament.

Singles

Athlete	Event	Group Stage	Rank	Round of 16	Quarterfinals	Semifinals	Final / BM	Rank
Athlete	Event	Opposition Score	Rank	Opposition Score	Opposition Score	Opposition Score	Opposition Score	Rank
Padasak Tanviriyavechakul	Boys	Group D Alassani (TOG); W 3–0	2 Q	Calderano (BRA); L 3–4	Did not advance			16
Padasak Tanviriyavechakul	Boys	Yin (SIN); W 3–1	2 Q	Calderano (BRA); L 3–4	Did not advance			16
Padasak Tanviriyavechakul	Boys	Yang (TPE); L 1–3	2 Q	Calderano (BRA); L 3–4	Did not advance			16
Tamolwan Khetkhuan	Girls	Group H Lagsir (ALG); W 3–0	1 Q	Mukherjee (IND); W 4–2	Zhang (USA); L 1–4	Did not advance		9
Tamolwan Khetkhuan	Girls	Luo (CAN); W 3–0	1 Q	Mukherjee (IND); W 4–2	Zhang (USA); L 1–4	Did not advance		9
Tamolwan Khetkhuan	Girls	Yee (SIN); W 3–0	1 Q	Mukherjee (IND); W 4–2	Zhang (USA); L 1–4	Did not advance		9

Team

Athletes	Event	Group Stage	Rank	Round of 16	Quarterfinals	Semifinals	Final / BM	Rank
Athletes	Event	Opposition Score	Rank	Opposition Score	Opposition Score	Opposition Score	Opposition Score	Rank
Thailand; Tamolwan Khetkhuan (THA); Padasak Tanviriyavechakul (THA)	Mixed	Latin America 3 Edghill (GUY)/ Toranzos (PAR); W 3–0	1 Q	Germany; Wan (GER)/ Ort (GER); W 2–1	Chinese Taipei; Chiu (TPE)/ Yang (TPE); W 2–0	China; Liu (CHN)/ Fan (CHN); L 0–2	Hong Kong; Doo (HKG)/ Hung (HKG); L 0–2	4
Thailand; Tamolwan Khetkhuan (THA); Padasak Tanviriyavechakul (THA)	Mixed	Croatia; Rakovac (CRO)/ Pucar (CRO); W 3– 0	1 Q	Germany; Wan (GER)/ Ort (GER); W 2–1	Chinese Taipei; Chiu (TPE)/ Yang (TPE); W 2–0	China; Liu (CHN)/ Fan (CHN); L 0–2	Hong Kong; Doo (HKG)/ Hung (HKG); L 0–2	4
Thailand; Tamolwan Khetkhuan (THA); Padasak Tanviriyavechakul (THA)	Mixed	Austria; Levenko (AUT)/ Mischek (AUT); W 3–0	1 Q	Germany; Wan (GER)/ Ort (GER); W 2–1	Chinese Taipei; Chiu (TPE)/ Yang (TPE); W 2–0	China; Liu (CHN)/ Fan (CHN); L 0–2	Hong Kong; Doo (HKG)/ Hung (HKG); L 0–2	4

Qualification Legend: Q=Main Bracket (medal); qB=Consolation Bracket (non-medal)

== Taekwondo ==
Thailand qualified two athletes based on its performance at the Taekwondo Qualification Tournament.

Boys

Athlete	Event	Round of 16	Quarterfinals	Semifinals	Final	Rank
Athlete	Event	Opposition Result	Opposition Result	Opposition Result	Opposition Result	Rank
Tawin Hanprab	−48 kg	Abdullah B S Ghazal (YEM); W 18–5	Mahdi Eshaghi (IRI); L 12–20	Did not advance		

Girls

Athlete	Event	Round of 16	Quarterfinals	Semifinals	Final	Rank
Athlete	Event	Opposition Result	Opposition Result	Opposition Result	Opposition Result	Rank
Panipak Wongpattanakit	−44 kg	NGUYEN THI THU Thuy (VIE); W 12 (PTG)–0	Farahnaz Yaqubi (AFG); W 19 (PTG)–0	CHEN Zih-Ting (TPE); W 8–1	Ceren Ozbek (AZE); W 21 (PTG)–1	Gold medal

== Tennis ==
Thailand qualified one athlete based on the 9 June 2014 ITF World Junior Rankings.

Singles

Athlete	Event	Round of 32	Round of 16	Quarterfinals	Semifinals	Final / BM	Rank
Athlete	Event	Opposition Score	Opposition Score	Opposition Score	Opposition Score	Opposition Score	Rank
Kamonwan Buayam	Girls' Singles	Greetje Minnen (BEL); W 2–0 (7–6, 6–1)	Jeļena Ostapenko (LAT); W 2–1 (1–6, 6–4, 6–4)	Iryna Shymanovich (BLR); L 1–2 (7–6, 3–6, 4–6)	Did not advance		

Doubles

Athletes	Event	Round of 32	Round of 16	Quarterfinals	Semifinals	Final / BM	Rank
Athletes	Event	Opposition Score	Opposition Score	Opposition Score	Opposition Score	Opposition Score	Rank
Kamonwan Buayam (THA); Kim Dabin (KOR)	Girls' Doubles	—N/a	Darya Kasatkina (RUS); Anastasiya Komardina (RUS); L 1–2 (7–6, 3–6, 9–11)	Did not advance			
Kamonwan Buayam (THA); Chung Yun-seong (KOR)	Mixed Doubles	Luisa Veras Stefani (BRA); Orlando Luz (BRA); L 0–2 (2–6, 2–6)	Did not advance				

== Weightlifting ==
Thailand qualified 1 quota in the boys' events and 2 quotas in the girls' events based on the team ranking after the 2013 Weightlifting Youth World Championships.

Boys

Athlete	Event	Snatch		Clean & jerk		Total	Rank
Athlete	Event	Result	Rank	Result	Rank	Total	Rank
Sakda Meeboon	−62 kg	112	4	144	1	256	Silver medal

Girls

Athlete	Event	Snatch		Clean & jerk		Total	Rank
Athlete	Event	Result	Rank	Result	Rank	Total	Rank
Rattanaphon Pakkaratha	−53 kg	81	2	109	1	190	Gold medal
Dunganksorn Chaidee	+63 kg	106	1	138	1	244	Gold medal
