= Weightlifting at the 2014 Summer Youth Olympics – Boys' 62 kg =

Boys' 62 at the II Summer Youth Olympic Games
- Venue: Nanjing International Expo Center
- Dates: August 18, 2014
- Competitors: 11 from 11 nations
- Winning total weight: 263kg

Medalists
1st place, gold medalist(s)		Pak Jong-ju	North Korea
2nd place, silver medalist(s)		Sakda Meeboon	Thailand
3rd place, bronze medalist(s)		Mirko Zanni	Italy

The boys' 62 kg weightlifting event was the second men's event at the weightlifting competition at the 2014 Summer Youth Olympics, with competitors limited to a maximum of 62 kilograms of body mass.

Each lifter performed in both the snatch and clean and jerk lifts, with the final score being the sum of the lifter's best result in each. The athlete received three attempts in each of the two lifts; the score for the lift was the heaviest weight successfully lifted.

== Results ==
Rank	Name	Body Weight	Snatch (kg)				Clean & Jerk (kg)				Total (kg)
Rank	Name	Body Weight	1	2	3	Res	1	2	3	Res	Total (kg)
1st place, gold medalist(s)	Pak Jong-ju (PRK)	61.35	113	117	120	120	143	~~150~~	~~150~~	143	263
2nd place, silver medalist(s)	Sakda Meeboon (THA)	61.95	108	110	112	112	141	~~144~~	144	144	256
3rd place, bronze medalist(s)	Mirko Zanni (ITA)	61.69	115	120	~~124~~	120	135	~~140~~	~~140~~	135	255
4	Söhbet Tirkişow (TKM)	61.37	110	~~115~~	115	115	133	137	~~140~~	137	252
5	Pawel Brylak (POL)	61.93	105	109	~~111~~	109	136	141	~~144~~	141	250
6	Oscar Rodríguez (MEX)	61.73	100	105	~~108~~	105	130	135	138	138	243
7	Firdy Ghivari (INA)	62.00	97	102	~~106~~	102	121	~~126~~	~~126~~	121	223
8	Poama Qaqa (FIJ)	61.24	90	95	98	98	108	~~113~~	113	113	211
9	Ehsan Shalabi (LBA)	60.09	85	90	95	95	105	~~112~~	~~115~~	105	200
10	Igo Lohia (PNG)	59.69	70	~~75~~	75	75	90	95	100	100	175
11	Marcellus Taman (FSM)	60.56	45	50	53	53	55	60	~~65~~	60	113
