= Moldova at the 2014 Summer Youth Olympics =

- IOC code: MDA
- NOC: Moldova Olympic Committee
- Website: www.olympic.md

in Nanjing
- Competitors: 11 in 6 sports
- Medals Ranked 43rd: Gold 1 Silver 1 Bronze 1 Total 3

Summer Youth Olympics appearances
- 2010; 2014; 2018

Moldova competed at the 2014 Summer Youth Olympics, in Nanjing, China from 16 August to 28 August 2014.

== Medalists ==
Medal	Name	Sport	Event	Date
Gold	Serghei Tarnovschi	Canoeing	Boys' Head-to-head Sprint C1	24 August
Silver	Dmitri Ceacusta	Wrestling	Boys' Freestyle 100 kg	27 August
Bronze	Tatiano Doncila	Wrestling	Girls' Freestyle 46 kg	26 August

== Athletics ==
Moldova qualified two athletes.

Qualification Legend: Q=Final A (medal); qB=Final B (non-medal); qC=Final C (non-medal); qD=Final D (non-medal); qE=Final E (non-medal)

Boys
Field Events

Athlete	Event	Qualification		Final	
Athlete	Event	Distance	Rank	Distance	Rank
Stefan Mura	Discus throw	55.57	7 qA	49.81	8

Girls
Field events

Athlete	Event	Qualification		Final	
Athlete	Event	Distance	Rank	Distance	Rank
Polina Ciui	Hammer throw	59.73	12 qB	57.43	12

== Canoeing ==
Moldova qualified one boat based on its performance at the 2013 World Junior Canoe Sprint and Slalom Championships.

Boys

Athlete	Event	Qualification		Round of 16		Quarterfinals	Semifinals	Final / BM	Rank
Athlete	Event	Time	Rank	Time	Rank	Opposition Result	Opposition Result	Opposition Result	Rank
Serghei Tarnovschi	C1 slalom	DQ		did not advance					
Serghei Tarnovschi	C1 sprint	1:43.818	1 Q	1:45.803	1 Q	Zoltan Koleszar (HUN); 1:43.857 W	Krystof Hajek (CZE); 1:44.356 W	Vadim Korobov (LTU); 1:57.688 W	1st place, gold medalist(s)

== Gymnastics ==
=== Rhythmic Gymnastics ===
Moldova qualified one athlete based on its performance at the 2014 Rhythmic Gymnastics Grand Prix in Moscow.

Individual

Athlete	Event	Qualification						Final					
Athlete	Event	Hoop	Ball	Clubs	Ribbon	Total	Rank	Hoop	Ball	Clubs	Ribbon	Total	Rank
Nicoleta Dulgheru	Individual	13.550	13.125	14.150	13.150	53.975	7	13.250	14.100	14.000	11.750	53.100	7

== Shooting ==
Moldova was given a wild card to compete.

Individual

Athlete	Event	Qualification		Final	
Athlete	Event	Points	Rank	Points	Rank
Ion Aric	Boys' 10m Air Pistol	558	13	did not advance	

Team

Athletes	Event	Qualification		Round of 16	Quarterfinals	Semifinals	Final / BM	Rank
Athletes	Event	Points	Rank	Opposition Result	Opposition Result	Opposition Result	Opposition Result	Rank
Ion Aric (MDA); Polina Konarieva (UKR)	Mixed Team 10m Air Pistol	749	7 Q	Rivera (COL)- Lomova (RUS); W 10-9	Igityan (ARM)- Chung (TPE); L 0-10	did not advance		5

== Swimming ==
Moldova qualified three swimmers.

Boys

Athlete	Event	Heat		Final	
Athlete	Event	Time	Rank	Time	Rank
Alexei Sancov	400 m freestyle	3:56.89	16	did not advance	
Alexei Sancov	800 m freestyle	—N/a		8:06.54	7

Girls

Athlete	Event	Heat		Semifinal		Final	
Athlete	Event	Time	Rank	Time	Rank	Time	Rank
Tatiana Perstniova	50 m backstroke	30.58	30	did not advance			
Tatiana Perstniova	100 m backstroke	1:04.05	19	did not advance			
Tatiana Perstniova	200 m backstroke	2:15.64	10	—N/a		did not advance	
Mihaela Bat	50 m breaststroke	DNS		did not advance			

== Wrestling ==
Moldova qualified three athletes based on its performance at the 2014 European Cadet Championships.

Key:
- VT - Victory by Fall.
- PP - Decision by Points - the loser with technical points.
- PO - Decision by Points - the loser without technical points.

Boys

Athlete	Event	Group stage				Final / RM	Rank
Athlete	Event	Opposition Score	Opposition Score	Opposition Score	Rank	Opposition Score	Rank
Dmitri Ceacusta	Freestyle -100kg	Pratt (AUS); W 4-0 ^{ST}	Rozykulyyev (TKM); W 4-0 ^{ST}	Yakubov (TJK); W 4-0 ^{ST}	1 F	Hajizada (AZE); L 1-3 ^{PP}	2nd place, silver medalist(s)
Dorin Cojocari	Greco-Roman -50kg	Aghaniachari (IRI); L 0-4 ^{VT}	Beytekin (TUR); L 0-4 ^{VT}	Najafov (AZE); L 0-4 ^{ST}	4 RM	Muller (MHL); W 4-0 ^{ST}	7

Girls

Athlete	Event	Group stage				Final / RM	Rank
Athlete	Event	Opposition Score	Opposition Score	Opposition Score	Rank	Opposition Score	Rank
Tatiano Doncila	Freestyle -46kg	Bramley (NZL); W 4-0 ^{VT}	Kim (PRK); L 1-3 ^{PP}	—N/a	2 BM	Castillo (VEN); W 3-1 ^{PP}	3rd place, bronze medalist(s)
