= Afghanistan at the 2014 Summer Youth Olympics =

- IOC code: AFG
- NOC: Afghanistan National Olympic Committee

in Nanjing
- Competitors: 1 in 1 sport

Summer Youth Olympics appearances
- 2010; 2014; 2018

Afghanistan competed at the 2014 Summer Youth Olympics, in Nanjing, China from 16 August to 28 August 2014.

== Taekwondo ==
Afghanistan was given a wild card to compete.

Girls

Athlete	Event	Round of 16	Quarterfinals	Semifinals	Final	Rank
Athlete	Event	Opposition Result	Opposition Result	Opposition Result	Opposition Result	Rank
Farahnaz Yaqubi	−44 kg	Bye	Wongpattanakit (THA); L 0–19	did not advance		5
