= Azerbaijan at the 2014 Summer Youth Olympics =

- Flag of Azerbaijan
- IOC code: AZE
- NOC: Azerbaijan Olympic Committee
- Website: www.noc-aze.org

in Nanjing
- Competitors: 21 in 9 sports
- Medals Ranked 10th: Gold 5 Silver 6 Bronze 1 Total 12

Summer Youth Olympics appearances (overview)
- 2010; 2014; 2018

Azerbaijan competed at the 2014 Summer Youth Olympics, in Nanjing, China from 16 August to 28 August 2014.

== Medalists ==
| Medal | Name | Sport | Event | Date |
|---|---|---|---|---|
| Gold | Said Guliyev | Taekwondo | Boys' -73 kg | 20 August |
| Gold | Islambek Dadov | Wrestling | Boys' Greco-Roman -69kg | 25 August |
| Gold | Rufat Huseynov | Boxing | Boys' -49 kg | 27 August |
| Gold | Teymur Mamedov | Wrestling | Boys' Freestyle -63kg | 27 August |
| Gold | Igbal Hajizade | Wrestling | Boys' Freestyle -100kg | 27 August |
| Silver | Natig Gurbanli | Judo | Boys' -55 kg | 17 August |
| Silver | Leyla Aliyeva | Judo | Girls' -44 kg | 17 August |
| Silver | Ceren Ozbek | Taekwondo | Girls' -44 kg | 17 August |
| Silver | Boris Yotov | Rowing | Boys' Single Sculls | 20 August |
| Silver | Jabbar Najafov | Wrestling | Boys' Greco-Roman -50kg | 25 August |
| Silver | Leyla Gurbanova | Wrestling | Girls' Freestyle -52kg | 26 August |
| Bronze | Nazim Babayev | Athletics | Boys' Triple Jump | 25 August |

== Archery ==
Azerbaijan qualified a female archer from its performance at the 2013 World Archery Youth Championships.

Individual

| Athlete | Event | Ranking round | | Round of 32 | Round of 16 | Quarterfinals | Semifinals | Final / BM | Rank |
| Athlete | Event | Score | Seed | Opposition Score | Opposition Score | Opposition Score | Opposition Score | Opposition Score | Rank |
|---|---|---|---|---|---|---|---|---|---|
| Sughrakhanim Mugabilzada | Girls' Individual | 618 | 23 | Zyzanska (POL); L 3–7 | Did not advance | | | | 17 |

Team

| Athletes | Event | Ranking round | | Round of 32 | Round of 16 | Quarterfinals | Semifinals | Final / BM | Rank |
| Athletes | Event | Score | Seed | Opposition Score | Opposition Score | Opposition Score | Opposition Score | Opposition Score | Rank |
|---|---|---|---|---|---|---|---|---|---|
| Sughrakhanim Mugabilzada (AZE); Hiroki Muto (JPN) | Mixed Team | 1292 | 1 | Zinsou (BEN); Lee (KOR); W 6-2 | Rivera (MEX); Koenig (FRA); W 5-4 | Li (CHN); Moreno (PHI); L 1-5 | Did not advance | | 8 |

== Athletics ==
Azerbaijan qualified three athletes.

Qualification Legend: Q=Final A (medal); qB=Final B (non-medal); qC=Final C (non-medal); qD=Final D (non-medal); qE=Final E (non-medal)

Boys
Field Events

| Athlete | Event | Qualification | | Final | |
| Athlete | Event | Distance | Rank | Distance | Rank |
|---|---|---|---|---|---|
| Nazim Babayev | Triple jump | 15.65 | 2 Q | 15.96 | 3rd place, bronze medalist(s) |

Girls
Track & road events

| Athlete | Event | Heats | | Final | |
| Athlete | Event | Result | Rank | Result | Rank |
|---|---|---|---|---|---|
| Benafeta Gadiez | 3000 m | 9:14.06 PB | 8 Q | 9:22.60 | 8 |

Field events

| Athlete | Event | Qualification | | Final | |
| Athlete | Event | Distance | Position | Distance | Position |
|---|---|---|---|---|---|
| Yelena Gladkova | Pole vault | 3.55 | 9 qB | 3.70 | 2 |

== Boxing ==
Azerbaijan qualified three boxers based on its performance at the 2014 AIBA Youth World Championships

Boys

| Athlete | Event | Preliminaries | Semifinals | Final / RM | Rank |
| Athlete | Event | Opposition Result | Opposition Result | Opposition Result | Rank |
|---|---|---|---|---|---|
| Rufat Huseynov | -49 kg | Kakara (IND); W 2-1 | Aikhynbay (KAZ); W 2-1 | Latipov (UZB); W 3-0 | 1st place, gold medalist(s) |
| Masud Yusifzada | -52 kg | Muhammad Ali (GBR); L 1-2 | Did not advance | Bout for 5th place Asenov (BUL); L w/o | 6 |
| Mahammadali Tahirov | +91 kg | Bye | Kadiru (GER); L TKO | Bronze medal Bout Kerimkhanov (RUS); L 0-3 | 4 |

== Judo ==
Azerbaijan qualified two athletes based on the results at the 2013 IJF Cadet World Championships.

Individual

| Athlete | Event | Quarterfinals | Semifinals | Rep 1 | Final / BM | Rank |
| Athlete | Event | Opposition Result | Opposition Result | Opposition Result | Opposition Result | Rank |
|---|---|---|---|---|---|---|
| Natig Gurbanli | Boys' -55 kg | Bye | Verstraeten (BEL); W 001-000 | —N/a | Zhauyntayev (KAZ); L 000-001 | 2nd place, silver medalist(s) |
| Leyla Aliyeva | Girls' -44 kg | Saiyn (KAZ); W 101-000 | Turcheva (RUS); W 000-000 | —N/a | Çakmaklı (TUR); L 000-000 | 2nd place, silver medalist(s) |

Team

| Athletes | Event | Round of 16 | Quarterfinals | Semifinals | Final | Rank |
| Athletes | Event | Opposition Result | Opposition Result | Opposition Result | Opposition Result | Rank |
|---|---|---|---|---|---|---|
| Team Tani; Francesco Aufieri (MLT); Rostislav Dashkov (KGZ); Luis Gonzalez (VEN); Natig Gurbanli (AZE); Ulyana Minenkova (BLR); Khulan Tseregbaatar (MGL); Hassiatou Yahaya Aboubacar (NIG) | Mixed Team | Team Xian (MIX); L 0 – 7 | Did not advance | | | 9 |
| Team Van De Walle; Paola Acevedo (PUR); Leyla Aliyeva (AZE); Nokutula Banda (ZAM); Marco Montoya (COL); Ivan Silva Morales (CUB); Unelle Snyman (RSA); Peta Zadro (BIH) | Mixed Team | Bye | Team Geesink (MIX); L 3 – 4 | Did not advance | | 5 |

== Rowing ==
Azerbaijan qualified one boat based on their performance at the 2013 Rowing Junior Championships.

| Athlete | Event | Heats | | Repechage | | Semifinals | | Final | |
| Athlete | Event | Time | Rank | Time | Rank | Time | Rank | Time | Rank |
|---|---|---|---|---|---|---|---|---|---|
| Boris Yotov | Boys' Single Sculls | 3:25.47 | 1 SA/B | —N/a | | 3:23.85 | 2 FA | 3:21.82 | 2nd place, silver medalist(s) |

Qualification Legend: FA=Final A (medal); FB=Final B (non-medal); FC=Final C (non-medal); FD=Final D (non-medal); SA/B=Semifinals A/B; SC/D=Semifinals C/D; R=Repechage

== Shooting ==
Azerbaijan was given a wild card to compete.

Individual

| Athlete | Event | Qualification | | Final | |
| Athlete | Event | Points | Rank | Points | Rank |
|---|---|---|---|---|---|
| Urfan Akhundov | Boys' 10m Air Pistol | 548 | 16 | Did not advance | |

Team

| Athletes | Event | Qualification | | Round of 16 | Quarterfinals | Semifinals | Final / BM | Rank |
| Athletes | Event | Points | Rank | Opposition Result | Opposition Result | Opposition Result | Opposition Result | Rank |
|---|---|---|---|---|---|---|---|---|
| Urfan Akhundov (AZE); Afaf El-Hodhod (EGY) | Mixed Team 10m Air Pistol | | | | Madrid (GUA)/ Rasmane (LAT); L 6 - 10 | Did not advance | | 5 |

== Swimming ==
Azerbaijan qualified one swimmer.

Girls

| Athlete | Event | Heat | | Final | |
| Athlete | Event | Time | Rank | Time | Rank |
|---|---|---|---|---|---|
| Elvira Hasanova | 200 m individual medley | 2:33.52 | 26 | Did not advance | |

== Taekwondo ==
Azerbaijan qualified four athletes based on its performance at the Taekwondo Qualification Tournament.

Boys

| Athlete | Event | Round of 16 | Quarterfinals | Semifinals | Final | Rank |
| Athlete | Event | Opposition Result | Opposition Result | Opposition Result | Opposition Result | Rank |
|---|---|---|---|---|---|---|
| Said Guliyev | −73 kg | —N/a | Serrano (COL); W 7 - 4 | Eissa (EGY); W 8 - 1 | Karim (GER); W 10 - 4 | 1st place, gold medalist(s) |

Girls

| Athlete | Event | Round of 16 | Quarterfinals | Semifinals | Final | Rank |
| Athlete | Event | Opposition Result | Opposition Result | Opposition Result | Opposition Result | Rank |
|---|---|---|---|---|---|---|
| Ceren Ozbek | −44 kg | Bye | Lúa (MEX); W 0 (SUP) - 0 | Stones (GBR); W 3 - 2 | Wongpattanakit (THA); L 1 - 21 (PTG) | 2nd place, silver medalist(s) |
| Safiye Polat | −49 kg | Bye | Huang (TPE); L 5 - 6 | Did not advance | | 5 |
| Gulhanim Yeşildaş | −55 kg | Martignani (ITA); L 0 - 0 (SUP) | Did not advance | | | 9 |

== Wrestling ==
Azerbaijan qualified five athletes based on its performance at the 2014 European Cadet Championships.

Key:

- VT - Victory by Fall.
- PP - Decision by Points - the loser with technical points.
- PO - Decision by Points - the loser without technical points.

Boys

| Athlete | Event | Group stage | | | | Final / RM | Rank |
| Athlete | Event | Opposition Score | Opposition Score | Opposition Score | Rank | Opposition Score | Rank |
|---|---|---|---|---|---|---|---|
| Teymur Mammadov | Freestyle -63kg | Julakidze (GEO); W 4 - 0 ^{ST} | Steyn (RSA); W 4 - 0 ^{ST} | Dydasco (PLW); W 4 - 0 ^{ST} | 1 Q | Montero (VEN); W 0 - 3 ^{PO} | 1st place, gold medalist(s) |
| Igbal Hajizada | Freestyle -100kg | Filho (BRA); W 4 - 0 ^{ST} | García (MEX); W 4 - 0 ^{ST} | Elgizawee (EGY); W 3-0 ^{PO} | 1 Q | Ceacusta (MDA); W 3 - 1 ^{PP} | 1st place, gold medalist(s) |
| Jabbar Najafov | Greco-Roman -50kg | Beytekin (TUR); W 4 - 0 ^{ST} | Aghaniachari (IRI); W 3 - 1 ^{PP} | Cojocari (MDA); W 4 - 0 ^{ST} | 1 Q | Bakhromov (UZB); L 1 - 3 ^{PP} | 2nd place, silver medalist(s) |
| Islambek Dadov | Greco-Roman -69kg | Alimov (UZB); W 3 - 0 ^{PP} | Polivadov (KAZ); W 3 - 0 ^{PO} | Ibrahim (EGY); W 3 - 0 ^{PO} | 1 Q | Manville (USA); W 3 - 0 ^{PO} | 1st place, gold medalist(s) |

Girls

| Athlete | Event | Group stage | | | | Final / RM | Rank |
| Athlete | Event | Opposition Score | Opposition Score | Opposition Score | Rank | Opposition Score | Rank |
|---|---|---|---|---|---|---|---|
| Leyla Gurbanova | Freestyle -52kg | Kennett (CAN); W | Kremzer (UKR); W | Vasquez (ESA); W 4 - 0 | 1 Q | Mukaida (JPN); L 1 - 3 ^{PP} | 2nd place, silver medalist(s) |
