= Mongolia at the 2014 Summer Youth Olympics =

- IOC code: MGL
- NOC: Mongolian National Olympic Committee

in Nanjing
- Competitors: 5 in 4 sports
- Medals Ranked 70th: Gold 0 Silver 1 Bronze 0 Total 1

Summer Youth Olympics appearances
- 2010; 2014; 2018

Mongolia competed at the 2014 Summer Youth Olympics, in Nanjing, China from 16 August to 28 August 2014.

== Medalists ==
Medal	Name	Sport	Event	Date
Silver	Dulguun Bolormaa	Wrestling	Girls' Freestyle -46kg	26 August

== Judo ==
Mongolia qualified two athletes based on its performance at the 2013 Cadet World Judo Championships.

Individual

Athlete	Event	Round of 32	Round of 16	Quarterfinals	Semifinals	Rep 1	Rep 2	Rep 3	Rep 4	Final / BM	Rank
Athlete	Event	Opposition Result	Opposition Result	Opposition Result	Opposition Result	Opposition Result	Opposition Result	Opposition Result	Opposition Result	Opposition Result	Rank
Tsogthaatar Tsend-ochir	Boys' -66 kg	Bye	Wu (CHN); L 0001 – 0002	did not advance		Castro (GUM); W 1001 – 0002	Wawrzyczek (POL); L 0000 – 1000	did not advance			13
Khulan Tseregbaatar	Girls' -52 kg	Bye	Einstein (SWE); L 0000 – 0001	did not advance		Bye	Lorenzana (GUA); W 0003 – 0002	Acevedo (PUR); W 0000 – 0000	Xiaoyu (CHN); L 0000 – 0002	did not advance	7

Team

Athletes	Event	Round of 16	Quarterfinals	Semifinals	Final	Rank
Athletes	Event	Opposition Result	Opposition Result	Opposition Result	Opposition Result	Rank
Team Yamashita; Frank de Wit (NED); Nellie Einstein (SWE); Sandrine Mbazoghe Endamne (GAB); Lubjana Piovesana (GBR); Sara Rodriguez (ESP); Tsogtbaatar Tsend-Ochir (MGL); Jorre Verstraeten (BEL)	Mixed Team	Team Douillet (MIX); L 3^{112} – 3^{200}	did not advance			9
Team Tani; Francesco Aufieri (MLT); Rostislav Dashkov (KGZ); Luis Gonzalez (VEN); Natig Gurbanli (AZE); Ulyana Minenkova (BLR); Khulan Tseregbaatar (MGL); Hassiatou Yahaya Aboubacar (NIG)	Mixed Team	Team Xian (MIX); L 0 – 7	did not advance			9

== Shooting ==
Mongolia qualified one shooter based on its performance at the 2014 Asian Shooting Championships.

Individual

Athlete	Event	Qualification		Final	
Athlete	Event	Points	Rank	Points	Rank
Angirmaa Nergui	Girls' 10m Air Rifle	411.9	7 Q	80.1	8

Team

Athletes	Event	Qualification		Round of 16	Quarterfinals	Semifinals	Final / BM	Rank
Athletes	Event	Points	Rank	Opposition Result	Opposition Result	Opposition Result	Opposition Result	Rank
Angirmaa Nergui (MGL); Prashant Prashant (IND)	Mixed Team 10m Air Rifle	813.5	12 Q	N Khedmati (IRI); C Friman (FIN); W 10 – 7	V Sukhorukova (UKR); S Lu (TPE); L 9 – 10	did not advance		7

== Weightlifting ==
Mongolia qualified 1 quota in the girls' events based on the team ranking after the 2014 Weightlifting Youth & Junior Asian Championships.

Girls

Athlete	Event	Snatch		Clean & jerk		Total	Rank
Athlete	Event	Result	Rank	Result	Rank	Total	Rank
Ankhtsetseg Munkhjantsan	−63 kg	94	2	113	4	207	4

== Wrestling ==
Mongolia qualified one athlete based on its performance at the 2014 Asian Cadet Championships.

Key:
- VT - Victory by Fall.
- PP - Decision by Points - the loser with technical points.
- PO - Decision by Points - the loser without technical points.

Girls

Athlete	Event	Group stage				Final / RM	Rank
Athlete	Event	Opposition Score	Opposition Score	Opposition Score	Rank	Opposition Score	Rank
Dulguun Bolormaa	Freestyle -46kg	I Roik (BLR); W 4 – 0	KKaddour (ALG); W 4 – 0	A Castillo (VEN); W 4 – 0	1 Q	S Kim (PRK); L 1 – 3 ^{PP}	2nd place, silver medalist(s)
