= Papua New Guinea at the 2014 Summer Youth Olympics =

- IOC code: PNG
- NOC: Papua New Guinea Sports Federation and Olympic Committee

in Nanjing
- Competitors: 24 in 5 sports
- Medals: Gold 0 Silver 0 Bronze 0 Total 0

Summer Youth Olympics appearances
- 2010; 2014; 2018

Papua New Guinea competed at the 2014 Summer Youth Olympics, in Nanjing, China from 16 August to 28 August 2014.

== Athletics ==
Papua New Guinea qualified one athlete.

Qualification Legend: Q=Final A (medal); qB=Final B (non-medal); qC=Final C (non-medal); qD=Final D (non-medal); qE=Final E (non-medal)

Boys
Track & road events

Athlete	Event	Heats		Final	
Athlete	Event	Result	Rank	Result	Rank
Dwayne Koroka	200 m	22.38 PB	17 qC	22.69	15

== Football ==
Papua New Guinea will compete in the girls' tournament.

=== Girls' Tournament ===
Roster

- Grace Batiy
- Eileen Daviaga
- Belinda Giada
- Mercedes Hapoto
- Vicktyla Jackson
- Margret Joseph
- Faith Kasiray
- Robertlyn Kig
- Cheryl Ling
- Francesca Mani
- Samantha Matan
- Joanne Miping
- Isabella Natera
- Alison Paulias
- Natasha Sagem
- Marity Sep
- Selina Unamba
- Loreta Yagum

Group Stage

Team	Pld	W	D	L	GF	GA	GD	Pts
Venezuela	2	2	0	0	13	2	+11	6
Slovakia	2	1	0	1	6	6	0	3
Papua New Guinea	2	0	0	2	0	11	−11	0

14 August 2014
18:00 CST

Papua New Guinea	0–7	Venezuela
	Report	Castellanos 19', 40', 49', 69'; Vergara 47'; Pasquel 61'; Marquez 82'

Wutaishan Stadium, Nanjing
Referee: He Jin (China)

20 August 2014
18:00 CST

Slovakia	4–0	Papua New Guinea
Sucha 11'; Sunovska 35', 54'; Jancova 68'	Report

Wutaishan Stadium, Nanjing
Referee: Gladys Lengwe (Zambia)

Placement 5–6

25 August 2014
18:00 CST

Papua New Guinea	3–2	Namibia
Giada 1', 29'; Sep 34'	Report	Haoses 16'; Kooper 40+1'

Wutaishan Stadium, Nanjing
Referee: He Jin (China)

== Sailing ==
Papua New Guinea was given a reallocation boat based on being a top ranked nation not yet qualified.

Athlete	Event	Race											Net Points	Final Rank
Athlete	Event	1	2	3	4	5	6	7	8	9	10	M*	Net Points	Final Rank
Teariki Numa	Boys' Byte CII	28	29	28	~~30~~	29	30	30	30	Canceled			204	30

== Swimming ==
Papua New Guinea qualified two swimmers.

Boys

Athlete	Event	Heat		Semifinal		Final	
Athlete	Event	Time	Rank	Time	Rank	Time	Rank
Collin Akara	50 m freestyle	25.61	37	did not advance			
Collin Akara	100 m freestyle	58.45	37	did not advance			

Girls

Athlete	Event	Heat		Semifinal		Final	
Athlete	Event	Time	Rank	Time	Rank	Time	Rank
Barbara Vali-Skelton	50 m breaststroke	36.80	30	did not advance			
Barbara Vali-Skelton	100 m breaststroke	1:20.25	29	did not advance			

== Weightlifting ==
Papua New Guinea qualified 1 quota in the boys' and girls' events based on the team ranking after the 2014 Weightlifting Oceania Championships.

Boys

Athlete	Event	Snatch		Clean & jerk		Total	Rank
Athlete	Event	Result	Rank	Result	Rank	Total	Rank
Igo Lohia	−62 kg	75	10	100	10	175	10

Girls

Athlete	Event	Snatch		Clean & jerk		Total	Rank
Athlete	Event	Result	Rank	Result	Rank	Total	Rank
Bea Ovia	−48 kg	51	11	63	11	114	11
