= Danial Salehimehr =

Iranian taekwondo athlete (born 1997)

Personal information
- Nationality: Iranian
- Born: May 10, 1997 (age 29) Babol, Iran

Sport
- Country: Iran
- Sport: Taekwondo
- Team: Iran
Medal record
Representing Iran
Youth Olympic Games
Bronze medal – third place	2014 Nanjing	-73kg
Youth Asian Championships
Gold medal – first place	2013 Jakarta	-73kg

Danial Salehimehr (Persian: دانیال صالحی مهر; born 10 May 1997) is an Iranian taekwondo athlete. Danial won the Gold medal of the Asian Youth Championships in Jakarta in 2013 and also he achieved the Bronze medal of the 2014 Summer Youth Olympics Games in Nanjing.

== Awards and honors ==
- Gold medal of the Asian Youth Championships in Jakarta in 2013
- Bronze medal of the Summer Youth Olympics Games in Nanjing in 2014
- Gold medal of the Croatia Open in 2010
- Gold medal of the German Open in 2012
- Gold medal of the South Korea Open in 2014
