= Pak Jong-ju =

North Korean weightlifter (born 1997)

Personal information
- Nationality: North Korean
- Born: 14 March 1997 (age 29)
- Weight: 66.95 kg (148 lb)

Sport
- Country: North Korea
- Sport: Weightlifting
- Event: –67 kg
- Club: April 25 Sports Club
Medal record
Men's weightlifting
Representing North Korea
World Championships
Bronze medal – third place	2019 Pattaya	–67 kg
Asian Championships
Bronze medal – third place	2019 Ningbo	–67 kg
Youth Olympic Games
Gold medal – first place	2014 Nanjing	-62 kg

Pak Jong-ju (born 14 March 1997) is a North Korean weightlifter competing in the 69 kg and 62 kg categories until 2018 and 67 kg starting in 2018 after the International Weightlifting Federation reorganized the categories.

== Career ==
He was the Gold Medalist at the 2014 Summer Youth Olympics in the 62 kg category. In 2018 he competed in the newly created 67 kg division at the 2018 World Weightlifting Championships and finished sixth.

He competed at the 2019 IWF World Cup (a qualifying event for the 2020 Summer Olympics) held in Fuzhou. He won a gold medal in the total with 318 kg competing in the 67 kg division.

== Major results ==
Year	Venue	Weight	Snatch (kg)				Clean & Jerk (kg)				Total	Rank
Year	Venue	Weight	1	2	3	Rank	1	2	3	Rank	Total	Rank
World Championships
2018	Ashgabat, Turkmenistan	67 kg	~~140~~	140	~~144~~	10	175	~~180~~	~~181~~	6	315	6
2019	Pattaya, Thailand	67 kg	142	~~146~~	~~146~~	9	178	184	188 WR	1st place, gold medalist(s)	330	3rd place, bronze medalist(s)
Asian Championships
2019	Ningbo, China	67 kg	140	~~143~~	143	3rd place, bronze medalist(s)	175	179	~~184~~	2nd place, silver medalist(s)	322	3rd place, bronze medalist(s)
IWF World Cup
2019	Fuzhou, China	67 kg	138	141	~~143~~	2nd place, silver medalist(s)	174	~~177~~	177	1st place, gold medalist(s)	318	1st place, gold medalist(s)
