= Armenia at the 2014 Summer Youth Olympics =

- IOC code: ARM
- NOC: Armenian Olympic Committee
- Website: www.armnoc.am

in Nanjing
- Competitors: 14 in 7 sports
- Flag bearer: Vahan Mkhitaryan
- Medals Ranked 29th: Gold 2 Silver 2 Bronze 3 Total 7

Summer Youth Olympics appearances (overview)
- 2010; 2014; 2018

Armenia competed at the 2014 Summer Youth Olympics, in Nanjing, China from 16 August to 28 August 2014.

== Medalists ==
Medal	Name	Sport	Event	Date
Gold	Hakob Mkrtchyan	Weightlifting	Boys' −77 kg	21 August
Gold	Simon Martirosyan	Weightlifting	Boys' +85 kg	23 August
Silver	Hrachik Babayan	Shooting	Boys' 10m Air Rifle	20 August
Silver	Zaven Mikaelyan	Wrestling	Boys' Greco-Roman -58kg	25 August
Bronze	Narek Manasyan	Boxing	Boys' -81 kg	27 August
Bronze	Vaghinak Matevosyan	Wrestling	Boys' Freestyle -54kg	27 August
Bronze	Sargis Hovsepyan	Wrestling	Boys' Freestyle -76kg	27 August

== Boxing ==
Armenia qualified two boxers based on its performance at the 2014 AIBA Youth World Championships

Boys

Athlete	Event	Preliminaries	Semifinals	Final / RM	Rank
Athlete	Event	Opposition Result	Opposition Result	Opposition Result	Rank
Narek Manasyan	-81 kg	Tekneci (TUR); W 3-0	Kazakov (KAZ); L 1-2	Bronze medal Bout Riley (GBR); W 2–1	3rd place, bronze medalist(s)

Girls

Athlete	Event	Preliminaries	Semifinals	Final / RM	Rank
Athlete	Event	Opposition Result	Opposition Result	Opposition Result	Rank
Anush Grigoryan	-51 kg	Balkibekova (KAZ); W 3–0	Chang (CHN); L 0–3	Bronze medal Bout Istık (TUR); L 1–2	4

== Diving ==
Armenia qualified one diver based on its performance at the Nanjing 2014 Diving Qualifying Event.

Athlete	Event	Preliminary		Final	
Athlete	Event	Points	Rank	Points	Rank
Lev Sargsyan	Boys' 10 m platform	490.25	2	467.65	7
Laura Bilotta (ITA); Lev Sargsyan (ARM)	Mixed team	—N/a		348.60	4

== Gymnastics ==
=== Artistic Gymnastics ===
Armenia qualified one athlete based on its performance at the 2014 European MAG Championships. Vigen Khachatryan had problems with his back and consequently did not perform on parallel bars and horizontal bar. With the performance on all apparatus being a requirement for gymnasts at the YOG, Vigen was not eligible to advance to the finals.

Boys

Athlete	Event	Apparatus						Total	Rank
Athlete	Event	F	PH	R	V	PB	HB	Total	Rank
Vigen Khachatryan	Qualification	14.000 (3)	12.800 (17)	13.700 (4)	14.425 (3)	-	-	-	-

== Judo ==
Armenia qualified one athlete based on its performance at the 2013 Cadet World Judo Championships.

Individual

Athlete	Event	Round of 32	Round of 16	Quarterfinals	Semifinals	Rep 1	Rep 2	Rep 3	Rep 4	Final / BM	Rank
Athlete	Event	Opposition Result	Opposition Result	Opposition Result	Opposition Result	Opposition Result	Opposition Result	Opposition Result	Opposition Result	Opposition Result	Rank
Harutyun Dermishyan	Boys' -66 kg	Ryu (KOR); L 010-110	Did not advance			Gandia (PUR); W 100-001	Tarapanov (BUL); W 110-000	Diaz (USA); W 010-000	Tursunov (UZB); L 000-110	Did not advance	7

Team

Athletes	Event	Round of 16	Quarterfinals	Semifinals	Final	Rank
Athletes	Event	Opposition Result	Opposition Result	Opposition Result	Opposition Result	Rank
Team Ruska; Sadjia Amrane (ALG); Jose Basile (BRA); Harutyun Dermishyan (ARM); Szabina Gercsák (HUN); Lovro Kovac (CRO); Kamila Pasternak (POL); Julian Sancho (CRC); Betina Temelkova (BUL)	Mixed Team	Bye	Team Rouge (MIX); L 2 – 5	Did not advance		5

== Shooting ==
Armenia qualified two shooters based on its performance at the 2014 European Shooting Championships.

Individual

Athlete	Event	Qualification		Final	
Athlete	Event	Points	Rank	Points	Rank
Hrachik Babayan	Boys' 10m Air Rifle	624.8	2 Q	204.3	2nd place, silver medalist(s)
Zaven Igityan	Boys' 10m Air Pistol	570	5 Q	137.4	5

Team

Athletes	Event	Qualification		Round of 16	Quarterfinals	Semifinals	Final / BM	Rank
Athletes	Event	Points	Rank	Opposition Result	Opposition Result	Opposition Result	Opposition Result	Rank
Hrachik Babayan (ARM); Sharmin Akter (BAN)	Mixed Team 10m Air Rifle	814.8	10 Q	Parshukova (RUS); Petanjek (CRO); W 10-7	Mekhimar (EGY); Peni (HUN); L 4-10	Did not advance		5
Zaven Igityan (ARM); Ting-Yu Chung (TPE)	Mixed Team 10m Air Pistol		Q	Kim (KOR); Schulze (CAN); W	Aric (MDA); Konarieva (UKR); W 10 - 0	Svechnikov (UZB); Nencheva (BUL); L 8 - 10	Madrid (GUA); Rasmane (LAT); L 8 - 10	4

== Swimming ==
Armenia qualified one swimmer.

Boys

Athlete	Event	Heat		Semifinal		Final	
Athlete	Event	Time	Rank	Time	Rank	Time	Rank
Vahan Mkhitaryan	50 m freestyle	23.62	18	Did not advance			
Vahan Mkhitaryan	100 m freestyle	53.20	32	Did not advance			
Vahan Mkhitaryan	50 m butterfly	26.40	36	Did not advance			

== Weightlifting ==
Armenia qualified 2 quotas in the boys' events based on the team ranking after the 2013 Weightlifting Youth World Championships. Later Armenia qualified 1 quota in the girls' events based on the team ranking after the 2014 Weightlifting Youth European Championships.

Boys

Athlete	Event	Snatch		Clean & jerk		Total	Rank
Athlete	Event	Result	Rank	Result	Rank	Total	Rank
Hakob Mkrtchyan	−77 kg	142	1	177	1	319	1st place, gold medalist(s)
Simon Martirosyan	+85 kg	170	1	221	1	391	1st place, gold medalist(s)

Girls

Athlete	Event	Snatch		Clean & jerk		Total	Rank
Athlete	Event	Result	Rank	Result	Rank	Total	Rank
Sona Poghosyan	−63 kg	79	6	100	6	179	6

== Wrestling ==
Armenia qualified three athletes based on its performance at the 2014 European Cadet Championships.

Key:

- VT - Victory by Fall.
- PP - Decision by Points - the loser with technical points.
- PO - Decision by Points - the loser without technical points.

Boys

Athlete	Event	Group stage					Final / RM	Rank
Athlete	Event	Opposition Score	Opposition Score	Opposition Score	Opposition Score	Rank	Opposition Score	Rank
Vaghinak Matevosyan	Freestyle -54kg	Corbett (NZL)	Aular (VEN)	Guvazhokov (RUS); W 3-1	Kuatbek (KAZ); L	2 Q	Al-Shebami (YEM); W 4-0 ^{ST}	3rd place, bronze medalist(s)
Sargis Hovsepyan	Freestyle -76kg	Yamasaki (JPN); L	Vou (ASA); W 4-0	Gurm (CAN); W	—N/a	2 Q	Izquierdo (COL); W 4-1 ^{ST}	3rd place, bronze medalist(s)
Zaven Mikaelyan	Greco-Roman -58kg	de Los Santos (DOM); W 4-0 ^{ST}	Destribats (ARG); W 4-0 ^{ST}	Nasr (TUN); W 4-0 ^{ST}	—N/a	1 Q	Zubairov (RUS); L 1-4 ^{ST}	2nd place, silver medalist(s)
