= Venezuela at the 2014 Summer Youth Olympics =

- IOC code: VEN
- NOC: Venezuelan Olympic Committee
- Website: www.covoficial.com.ve

in Nanjing
- Competitors: 59 in 15 sports
- Medals Ranked 53rd: Gold 0 Silver 6 Bronze 2 Total 8

Summer Youth Olympics appearances (overview)
- 2010; 2014; 2018; 2026

Venezuela competed at the 2014 Summer Youth Olympics, in Nanjing, China from 16 August to 28 August 2014.

== Medalists ==
Medal	Name	Sport	Event	Date
Silver	Carlos Claverie	Swimming	Boys' 200m breaststroke	20 Aug
Silver	Carlos Claverie	Swimming	Boys' 50m breaststroke	22 Aug
Silver	Robeilys Peinado	Athletics	Girls' pole vault	23 Aug
Silver		Football	Girls	26 Aug
Silver	Anthony Montero Chirinos	Wrestling	Boys' freestyle −63 kg	27 Aug
Silver	Jose Gomez; Rolando Hernandez	Beach Volleyball	Boys	27 Aug
Bronze	Carlos Claverie	Swimming	Boys' 100m breaststroke	18 Aug
Bronze	Elvismar Rodriguez	Judo	Girls' −78 kg	19 Aug

== Archery ==
Venezuela qualified two archers from its performance at the American Continental Qualification Tournament.

Individual

Athlete	Event	Ranking round		Round of 32	Round of 16	Quarterfinals	Semifinals	Final / BM	Rank
Athlete	Event	Score	Seed	Opposition Score	Opposition Score	Opposition Score	Opposition Score	Opposition Score	Rank
Jose Capote	Boys' Individual	620	25	Han (TPE); L 2–6	Did not advance				17
Verona Villegas	Girls' Individual	628	17	Freywald (GER); W 6–2	Lee (KOR); L 2–6	Did not advance			9

Team

Athletes	Event	Ranking round		Round of 32	Round of 16	Quarterfinals	Semifinals	Final / BM	Rank
Athletes	Event	Score	Seed	Opposition Score	Opposition Score	Opposition Score	Opposition Score	Opposition Score	Rank
Jose Capote (VEN); Tanya Giaccheri (ITA)	Mixed Team	1270	26	Machado (BRA); Szafran (POL); L 3–5	Did not advance				17
Verona Villegas (VEN); Boris Balaz (SVK)	Mixed Team	1289	8	Oleksiuk (UKR); Reddig (NAM); W 6–0	Li (CHN); Moreno (PHI); L 3–5	Did not advance			9

== Athletics ==
Venezuela qualified eight athletes.

Qualification Legend: Q=Final A (medal); qB=Final B (non-medal); qC=Final C (non-medal); qD=Final D (non-medal); qE=Final E (non-medal)

Boys
Track & road events

Athlete	Event	Heats		Final	
Athlete	Event	Result	Rank	Result	Rank
Josneyber Ramirez	100 m	10.82	=7 Q	10.82	7
Samuel Cedeno	110 m hurdles	14.13	18 qC	14.19	14
Cumache Yolver	400 m hurdles	55.34	14 qB	54.15 PB	14
Jeferson Chacon	10 km walk	—N/a		DNF	

Field Events

Athlete	Event	Qualification		Final	
Athlete	Event	Distance	Rank	Distance	Rank
Edison Luna	Triple jump	13.97	15 qB	DNS	

Girls
Track & road events

Athlete	Event	Heats		Final	
Athlete	Event	Result	Rank	Result	Rank
María Simancas	400 m	56.63	14 qB	54.92	11

Field events

Athlete	Event	Qualification		Final	
Athlete	Event	Distance	Rank	Distance	Rank
Robeilys Peinado	Pole vault	3.70	2 Q	4.10	2nd place, silver medalist(s)
Yerilda Zapata	Discus throw	36.90	15 qB	41.86	11

== Basketball ==
Venezuela qualified a boys' and girls' team from their performance at the 2013 3x3 World Tour Final.

Skills Competition

Athlete	Event	Qualification				Final			
Athlete	Event	Round 1	Round 2	Total	Rank	Round 1	Round 2	Total	Rank
Adrian Espinoza	Boys' Dunk Contest	18	16	34	11	Did not advance			
Jose Materan	Boys' Dunk Contest	DNS				Did not advance			

Athlete	Event	Qualification			Final		
Athlete	Event	Points	Time	Rank	Points	Time	Rank
Laury Garcia	Girls' Shoot-out Contest	4	24.5	23	Did not advance		
Givanna Padilla	Girls' Shoot-out Contest	2	27.3	54	Did not advance		

=== Boys' tournament ===
Roster

- Cristhian Centeno
- Garmendia Daniel
- Adrian Espinoza
- Jose Materan

Group Stage

Pos	Team	Pld	W	L	PF	PA	PD	Pts	Qualification
1	Argentina	9	7	2	156	101	+55	16	Round of 16
2	Russia	9	7	2	153	117	+36	16	Round of 16
3	Spain	9	7	2	145	135	+10	16	Round of 16
4	New Zealand	9	6	3	145	129	+16	15	Round of 16
5	Venezuela	9	5	4	136	128	+8	14	Round of 16
6	Brazil	9	4	5	116	92	+24	13 (Note: BRA +5, ROU −5)	Round of 16
7	Romania	9	4	5	130	122	+8	13	Round of 16
8	Tunisia	9	3	6	115	130	−15	12	Round of 16
9	Andorra	9	2	7	129	168	−39	11	Eliminated
10	Guatemala	9	0	9	74	177	−103	9	Eliminated

Notes:

18 August 2014
18:00

Romania	15–13	Venezuela

Wutaishan Sports Center, Nanjing

18 August 2014
20:00

Venezuela	15–16	New Zealand

Wutaishan Sports Center, Nanjing

19 August 2014
20:00

Guatemala	12–17	Venezuela

Wutaishan Sports Center, Nanjing

20 August 2014
17:40

Russia	14–15	Venezuela

Wutaishan Sports Center, Nanjing

20 August 2014
21:40

Venezuela	15–21	Argentina

Wutaishan Sports Center, Nanjing

22 August 2014
19:00

Tunisia	5–13	Venezuela

Wutaishan Sports Center, Nanjing

23 August 2014
18:00

Venezuela	19–17	Andorra

Wutaishan Sports Center, Nanjing

23 August 2014
21:00

Spain	15–14	Venezuela

Wutaishan Sports Center, Nanjing

24 August 2014
18:40

Venezuela	15–13	Brazil

Wutaishan Sports Center, Nanjing

Knockout Stage

Round of 16	Quarterfinals	Semifinals	Final	Rank
Opposition Score	Opposition Score	Opposition Score	Opposition Score	Rank
Puerto Rico; W 20–18	Argentina; L 13–21	Did not advance		6

=== Girls' tournament ===
Roster

- Laury Garcia
- Montilla Maria
- Givanna Padilla
- Genesis Rivera

Group Stage

Pos	Team	Pld	W	D	L	PF	PA	PD	Pts	Qualification
1	Netherlands	9	8	0	1	164	87	+77	24	Round of 16
2	Hungary	9	8	0	1	146	91	+55	24	Round of 16
3	Spain	9	7	0	2	151	95	+56	21	Round of 16
4	Estonia	9	5	0	4	130	109	+21	15	Round of 16
5	China	9	5	0	4	128	103	+25	15	Round of 16
6	Germany	9	4	0	5	111	133	−22	12	Round of 16
7	Brazil	9	3	0	6	101	123	−22	9	Round of 16
8	Venezuela	9	2	0	7	101	153	−52	6	Round of 16
9	Slovenia	9	2	0	7	120	156	−36	6	Eliminated
10	Syria	9	1	0	8	68	170	−102	3	Eliminated

18 August 2014
19:20

Germany	12–10	Venezuela

Wutaishan Sports Center, Nanjing

19 August 2014
17:40

Venezuela	12–10	Brazil

Wutaishan Sports Center, Nanjing

19 August 2014
20:20

Netherlands	22–9	Venezuela

Wutaishan Sports Center, Nanjing

20 August 2014
19:00

Venezuela	vs.	China

Wutaishan Sports Center, Nanjing

22 August 2014
18:20

Estonia	16–7	Venezuela

Wutaishan Sports Center, Nanjing

22 August 2014
21:00

Slovenia	vs.	Venezuela

Wutaishan Sports Center, Nanjing

23 August 2014
18:40

Venezuela	16–17	Syria

Wutaishan Sports Center, Nanjing

24 August 2014
17:20

Hungary	vs.	Venezuela

Wutaishan Sports Center, Nanjing

24 August 2014
21:20

Venezuela	vs.	Spain

Wutaishan Sports Center, Nanjing

Knockout Stage

Round of 16	Quarterfinals	Semifinals	Final	Rank
Opposition Score	Opposition Score	Opposition Score	Opposition Score	Rank
United States; L 7–21	Did not advance			

== Beach Volleyball ==
Venezuela qualified a boys' team from their performance at the 2014 CSV Youth Beach Volleyball Tour.

Athletes	Event	Preliminary round	Standing	Round of 24	Round of 16	Quarterfinals	Semifinals	Final / BM	Rank
Athletes	Event	Opposition Score	Standing	Opposition Score	Opposition Score	Opposition Score	Opposition Score	Opposition Score	Rank
Jose Gomez; Rolando Hernandez	Boys'	DeFalco – Richard (USA); W 2–0	1 Q	Bye	Bogarin – Frutos (PAR); W 2–0	Figueroa – Rivera (PUR); W 2–1	Aulisi – Aveiro (ARG); W 2–0	Iarzutkin – Stoyanovskiy (RUS); L 0–2	2nd place, silver medalist(s)
Jose Gomez; Rolando Hernandez	Boys'	Ndagano – Ndayisabye (RWA); W	1 Q	Bye	Bogarin – Frutos (PAR); W 2–0	Figueroa – Rivera (PUR); W 2–1	Aulisi – Aveiro (ARG); W 2–0	Iarzutkin – Stoyanovskiy (RUS); L 0–2	2nd place, silver medalist(s)
Jose Gomez; Rolando Hernandez	Boys'	Kmiecik – Macura (POL); W	1 Q	Bye	Bogarin – Frutos (PAR); W 2–0	Figueroa – Rivera (PUR); W 2–1	Aulisi – Aveiro (ARG); W 2–0	Iarzutkin – Stoyanovskiy (RUS); L 0–2	2nd place, silver medalist(s)
Jose Gomez; Rolando Hernandez	Boys'	Kratz – Pristauz (AUT); W	1 Q	Bye	Bogarin – Frutos (PAR); W 2–0	Figueroa – Rivera (PUR); W 2–1	Aulisi – Aveiro (ARG); W 2–0	Iarzutkin – Stoyanovskiy (RUS); L 0–2	2nd place, silver medalist(s)
Jose Gomez; Rolando Hernandez	Boys'	Ashfiya – Licardo (INA); W 2–0	1 Q	Bye	Bogarin – Frutos (PAR); W 2–0	Figueroa – Rivera (PUR); W 2–1	Aulisi – Aveiro (ARG); W 2–0	Iarzutkin – Stoyanovskiy (RUS); L 0–2	2nd place, silver medalist(s)

== Cycling ==
Venezuela qualified a girls' team based on its ranking issued by the UCI.

Team

Athletes	Event	Cross-Country Eliminator		Time Trial			BMX		Cross-Country Race			Road Race			Total Pts	Rank
Athletes	Event	Rank	Points	Time	Rank	Points	Rank	Points	Time	Rank	Points	Time	Rank	Points	Total Pts	Rank
Daryorie Arrieche; Andrea Contreras	Girls' Team															

Mixed Relay

Athletes	Event	Cross-Country Girls' Race	Cross-Country Boys' Race	Boys' Road Race	Girls' Road Race	Total Time	Rank
Andrea Contreras (VEN); Mohamed Imam (EGY); Nikolaos Zegklis (GRE); Daryorie Arrieche (VEN)	Mixed Team Relay						

== Football ==
Venezuela qualified 1 girls' team by virtue of winning the 2013 South American Under-17 Women's Championship

=== Girls' Tournament ===
Roster

- Valentina Bonaiuto
- Iceis Briceno
- Nayluisa Caceres
- Yenleidys Caldoza
- Argelis Campos
- Deyna Castellanos
- Olimar Castillo
- Leidy Delpino
- Nikol Gonza
- Fatima Lobo
- Sandra Luzardo
- Greisbell Marquez
- Maria Ortegano
- Nathalie Pasquel
- Katherine Portillo
- Yuleisi Rivero
- Estefania Sequera
- Hilary Vergara

Group stage

Team	Pld	W	D	L	GF	GA	GD	Pts
Venezuela	2	2	0	0	13	2	+11	6
Slovakia	2	1	0	1	6	6	0	3
Papua New Guinea	2	0	0	2	0	11	−11	0

14 August 2014
18:00 CST

Papua New Guinea	0–7	Venezuela
	Report	Deyna Castellanos 19', 40', 49', 69'; Hilary Vergara 47'; Nathalie Pasquel 61'; Greisbell Marquez 82'

Wutaishan Stadium, Nanjing
Referee: He Jin (China)

17 August 2014
18:00

Venezuela	6–2	Slovakia
Deyna Castellanos 10', 13', 33'; Nathalie Pasquel 45', 72'; Yuleisi Rivero 61'	Report	Martina Surnovska 40', 58'

Wutaishan Stadium, Nanjing
Attendance: 4,503
Referee: Christina Unkel (United States)

Semi-final

23 August 2014
18:00

Venezuela	1–1	Mexico
Argelis Campos 2'	Report	Dayana Cazares 8'
Penalties
Olimar Castillo (penalty scored); Nathalie Pasquel (penalty scored); Sandra Luzardo (penalty missed); Deyna Castellanos (penalty scored); Nayluisa Caceres (penalty scored)	4–3	(penalty scored) Kimberly Rodriguez; (penalty scored) Vanessa Gonzalez; (penalty scored) Marianna Maldonado; (penalty missed) Daniela Garcia; (penalty missed) Montserrat Hernandez

Wutaishan Stadium, Nanjing
Attendance: 4,690
Referee: Morag Pirie (Great Britain)

Gold medal match

26 August 2014
20:45

Venezuela (silver)	0–5	China
	Report	Wan Wenting 10'; Xie Qiwen 19'; Ma Xiaolan 34'; Zhang Jiayun 45'; Wu Xi 80+1'

Wutaishan Stadium, Nanjing
Attendance: 11,678
Referee: Gladys Lengwe (Zambia)

== Golf ==
Venezuela qualified one team of two athletes based on the 8 June 2014 IGF Combined World Amateur Golf Rankings.

Individual

Athlete	Event	Round 1		Round 2			Round 3			Total	
Athlete	Event	Score	Rank	Score	Total	Rank	Score	Total	Rank	Score	Rank
Jorge García	Boys										
Maria Merchan	Girls	71	7	73	144	6					

Team

Athletes	Event	Round 1 (Foursome)		Round 2 (Fourball)			Round 3 (Individual Stroke)				Total	
Athletes	Event	Score	Rank	Score	Total	Rank	Boy	Girl	Total	Rank	Score	Rank
Jorge García; Maria Merchan	Mixed										278 (−10)	8

== Judo ==
Venezuela qualified two athletes based on its performance at the 2013 Cadet World Judo Championships.

Individual

Athlete	Event	Round of 32	Round of 16	Quarterfinals	Semifinals	Rep 1	Rep 2	Rep 3	Rep 4	Final / BM	Rank
Athlete	Event	Opposition Result	Opposition Result	Opposition Result	Opposition Result	Opposition Result	Opposition Result	Opposition Result	Opposition Result	Opposition Result	Rank
Luis Gonzalez	Boys' −66 kg	—N/a	Manzi (ITA); W 010–000	Abe (JPN); L 000–100	Did not advance	—N/a		Wawrzyczek (POL); L 000–000	Did not advance		11
Elvismar Rodriguez	Girls' −78 kg	—N/a	Pasternak (POL); W 110–000	Matic (CRO); L 000–001	Did not advance	—N/a		Bye	Pasternak (POL); W 100–000	Duchene (FRA); W 100–001	3rd place, bronze medalist(s)

Team

Athletes	Event	Round of 16	Quarterfinals	Semifinals	Final	Rank
Athletes	Event	Opposition Result	Opposition Result	Opposition Result	Opposition Result	Rank
Team Tani; Francesco Aufieri (MLT); Rostislav Dashkov (KGZ); Luis Gonzalez (VEN); Natig Gurbanli (AZE); Ulyana Minenkova (BLR); Khulan Tseregbaatar (MGL); Hassiatou Yahaya Aboubacar (NIG)	Mixed Team	Team Xian (MIX); L 0 – 7	Did not advance			9
Team Kano; Melisa Çakmaklı (TUR); Salim Darukhi (TJK); Mariam Janashvili (GEO); Arso Milic (MNE); Gavin Mogopa (BOT); Elvismar Rodriguez (VEN); Stoyan Tarapanov (BUL); Tea Tintor (SRB)	Mixed Team	Team Rouge (MIX); L 2 – 5	Did not advance			9

== Modern Pentathlon ==
Venezuela qualified one athlete based on its performance at the PANAM YOG Qualifiers.

Athlete	Event	Fencing Ranking Round (épée one touch)		Swimming (200 m freestyle)			Fencing Final Round (épée one touch)			Combined: Shooting/Running (10 m air pistol)/(3000 m)			Total Points	Final Rank
Athlete	Event	Results	Rank	Time	Rank	Points	Results	Rank	Points	Time	Rank	Points	Total Points	Final Rank
Berengerth Seguera	Boys' Individual													
Unknown; Berengerth Seguera (VEN)	Mixed Relay													

== Sailing ==
Venezuela was given a reallocation boat based on being a top ranked nation not yet qualified. Later they were given a reallocation spot based on being a top ranked nation not yet qualified.

Athlete	Event	Race											Net Points	Final Rank
Athlete	Event	1	2	3	4	5	6	7	8	9	10	M*	Net Points	Final Rank
Manuel de la Rosa	Boys' Techno 293	13	(21); OCS	14	17	12	18	21; OCS	Cancelled			116.00	95.00	18
Barbara Moya	Girls' Techno 293	21	(22); OCS	19	21	20	21	12	Cancelled			136.00	114.00	20

== Swimming ==
Venezuela qualified four swimmers.

Boys

Athlete	Event	Heat		Semifinal		Final	
Athlete	Event	Time	Rank	Time	Rank	Time	Rank
Robinson Molina	50 m backstroke	26.22	9 Q	26.35	12	Did not advance	
Robinson Molina	100 m backstroke	57.74	22	Did not advance			
Carlos Claverie	50 m breaststroke	28.19	2 Q	28.19	2 Q	27.94	2nd place, silver medalist(s)
Carlos Claverie	100 m breaststroke	1:01.62	1 Q	1:01.71	2 Q	1:01.56	3rd place, bronze medalist(s)
Carlos Claverie	200 m breaststroke	2:14.02	1 Q	—N/a		2:11.74	2nd place, silver medalist(s)

Girls

Athlete	Event	Heat		Semifinal		Final	
Athlete	Event	Time	Rank	Time	Rank	Time	Rank
Simone Palomo	200 m butterfly	2:16.94	17	—N/a		Did not advance	
Fernandez Vanessa	200 m butterfly	2:19.84	24	—N/a		Did not advance	

== Table Tennis ==
Venezuela qualified one athlete based on its performance at the Latin American Qualification Event.

Singles

Athlete	Event	Group Stage	Rank	Round of 16	Quarterfinals	Semifinals	Final / BM	Rank
Athlete	Event	Opposition Score	Rank	Opposition Score	Opposition Score	Opposition Score	Opposition Score	Rank
Gremlis Arvelo	Girls	Group A Doo (HKG)						
Gremlis Arvelo	Girls	Seera (UGA); W 3 – 0						
Gremlis Arvelo	Girls	Stefcova (CZE)						

Team

Athletes	Event	Group Stage	Rank	Round of 16	Quarterfinals	Semifinals	Final / BM	Rank
Athletes	Event	Opposition Score	Rank	Opposition Score	Opposition Score	Opposition Score	Opposition Score	Rank
Latin America 2 Gremlis Arvelo (VEN); Fermin Tenti (ARG)	Mixed		qB	Latin America 3 Edghill (GUY); Toranzos (PAR); W 2–1				

Qualification Legend: Q=Main Bracket (medal); qB=Consolation Bracket (non-medal)

== Triathlon ==
Venezuela qualified two athletes based on its performance at the 2014 American Youth Olympic Games Qualifier.

Individual

Athlete	Event	Swim (750m)	Trans 1	Bike (20 km)	Trans 2	Run (5 km)	Total Time	Rank
Jose Solorzano	Boys	09:54	00:44	29:21	00:28	16:52	0:57:19	15
Katherine Clemant Materano	Girls	10:07	00:50	31:40	00:29	20:48	1:03:54	14

Relay

Athlete	Event	Total Times per Athlete (Swim 250m, Bike 6.6km, Run 1.8km)	Total Group Time	Rank
America 1 Katherine Vanesa Clemant Materano (VEN); Javier Martin (CHI); Stephanie Jenks (USA); Charles Paquet (CAN)	Mixed Relay	23:14; 20:33; 22:08; 19:46	1:25:41	7
America 3 Barbara Dos Santos (BRA); Tyler Smith (BER); Giovanna Gonzalez Miranda (ESA); Jose Solorzano (VEN)	Mixed Relay	22:51; 21:04; 24:11; 22:11	1:30:17	11

== Weightlifting ==
Venezuela qualified 1 quota in the boys' events and 1 quota in the girls' events based on the team ranking after the 2013 Weightlifting Youth World Championships.

Boys

Athlete	Event	Snatch		Clean & jerk		Total	Rank
Athlete	Event	Result	Rank	Result	Rank	Total	Rank
Wilson Magallanes	−69 kg	115	6	153	4	268	5

Girls

Athlete	Event	Snatch		Clean & jerk		Total	Rank
Athlete	Event	Result	Rank	Result	Rank	Total	Rank
Yorlis Zabala	−53 kg	80	3	95	4	175	4

== Wrestling ==
Venezuela qualified three athletes based on its performance at the 2014 Pan American Cadet Championships.

Key:
- VT – Victory by Fall.
- PP – Decision by Points – the loser with technical points.
- PO – Decision by Points – the loser without technical points.

Boys

Athlete	Event	Group stage					Final / RM	Rank
Athlete	Event	Opposition Score	Opposition Score	Opposition Score	Opposition Score	Rank	Opposition Score	Rank
Eliezer Aular	Freestyle −54kg	Corbett (NZL)	Guvazhokov (RUS); L 0–4	Matevosyan (ARM)	Kuatbek (KAZ)	4 Q	Sejfualau (MKD); L 1–3	8
Anthony Montero Chirinos	Freestyle −63kg	Kumar (IND); W 3–1 ^{PP}	Moore (CAN); W	Lloyd (NZL); W	—N/a	1 Q	Mammadov (AZE); L 0–3 ^{PO}	2nd place, silver medalist(s)

Girls

Athlete	Event	Group stage				Final / RM	Rank
Athlete	Event	Opposition Score	Opposition Score	Opposition Score	Rank	Opposition Score	Rank
Adrianny Castillo	Freestyle −46kg	Kadour (ALG); W 4–0	Roik (BLR); W	Bolormaa (MGL); L 0–4	2 Q	Doncila (MDA); L 1–3 ^{PP}	4
