= Algeria at the 2014 Summer Youth Olympics =

- IOC code: ALG
- NOC: Algerian Olympic Committee

in Nanjing
- Competitors: 33 in 13 sports
- Medals: Gold 0 Silver 0 Bronze 0 Total 0

Summer Youth Olympics appearances (overview)
- 2010; 2014; 2018; 2026

Algeria competed at the 2014 Summer Youth Olympics, in Nanjing, China from 16 August to 28 August 2014.

== Athletics ==
Algeria qualified 12 athletes.

Qualification Legend: Q=Final A (medal); qB=Final B (non-medal); qC=Final C (non-medal); qD=Final D (non-medal); qE=Final E (non-medal)

Boys
Track & road events

Athlete	Event	Heats		Final	
Athlete	Event	Result	Rank	Result	Rank
Tahar Lazaar	800 m	2:00.99	17 qC	1:59.45	14
Taufiq Bouziane	3000 m	8:21.58 PB	8 Q	8:18.98 PB	6
Amine Bouanani	110 m hurdles	13.92 PB	14 qC	14.19	18
Ahmed Kenzi Saidia	2000 m steeplechase	5:41.73 PB	4 Q	5:49.22	6
Djaber Bouras	10000 m walk	—N/a		Disqualified	

Field Events

Athlete	Event	Qualification		Final	
Athlete	Event	Distance	Rank	Distance	Rank
Yasser Mohamed Tahar Triki	Long jump	NM qB		No mark	
Hicham Bouhanoun	High jump	2.07	7 Q	2.08	7

Girls
Track & road events

Athlete	Event	Heats		Final	
Athlete	Event	Result	Rank	Result	Rank
Abir Reffas	1500 m	4:41.17	16 qB	4:36.88	14
Noura Kherroubi	3000 m	10:08.86	14 qB	10:11.15	15
Ilham Zenati	2000 m steeplechase	7:30.59	16 qB	7:29.17	17

Field events

Athlete	Event	Qualification		Final	
Athlete	Event	Distance	Position	Distance	Position
Yousra Arar	High jump	1.60	15 qB	No mark	
May Massika Mesioud	Pole vault	NM qB		DNS	

== Boxing ==
Algeria qualified one boxer based on its performance at the 2014 AIBA Youth World Championships

Boys

Athlete	Event	Preliminaries	Semifinals	Final / RM	Rank
Athlete	Event	Opposition Result	Opposition Result	Opposition Result	Rank
Tamma Salem	Boys' −56 kg	Bye	Mihaylov (BUL); L 0–2	Bronze-medal match McGrail (GBR); L 0–3	4

== Cycling ==
Algeria qualified a boys' and girls' team based on its ranking issued by the UCI.

Team

Athletes	Event	Cross-Country Eliminator		Time Trial			BMX		Cross-Country Race			Road Race			Total Pts	Rank
Athletes	Event	Rank	Points	Time	Rank	Points	Rank	Points	Time	Rank	Points	Time	Rank	Points	Total Pts	Rank
Zoheir Benyoub; Islam Mansouri	Boys' team	28	0	5:28.66	22	0	27	0	–3 laps	26	0	1:37:29; 1:37:23	30; 8	20	20	21
Yasmine Elmeddah; Nour Megherbi	Girls' team	24	0	7:11.64	27	0	29	0	−2 laps	28	0	DNF; 1:27:52	51	0	0	31

Mixed relay

Athletes	Event	Cross-Country Girls' Race	Cross-Country Boys' Race	Boys' Road Race	Girls' Road Race	Total Time	Rank
Yasmine Elmeddah; Islam Mansouri; Zoheir Benyoub; Nour Megherbi	Mixed team relay	4:25	3:23	5:41	7:25	20:54	27

== Fencing ==
Algeria qualified two athletes based on its performance at the 2014 Cadet World Championships.

Boys

Athlete	Event	Pool Round	Seed	Round of 16	Quarterfinals	Semifinals	Final / BM	Rank
Athlete	Event	Opposition Score	Seed	Opposition Score	Opposition Score	Opposition Score	Opposition Score	Rank
Salim Heroui	Individual foil	1–6	12	Bianchi (ITA); L 6–15	Did not advance			9

Girls

Athlete	Event	Pool Round	Seed	Round of 16	Quarterfinals	Semifinals	Final / BM	Rank
Athlete	Event	Opposition Score	Seed	Opposition Score	Opposition Score	Opposition Score	Opposition Score	Rank
Abik Boungab	Individual sabre	1-4	9	Crovari (ITA); L 10–15	Did not advance			9

Mixed team

Athletes	Event	Round of 16	Quarterfinals	Semifinals / PM	Final / PM	Rank
Athletes	Event	Opposition Score	Opposition Score	Opposition Score	Opposition Score	Rank
Africa; Abik Boungab (ALG); Ahmed El-Sayed (EGY); Yara El-Shakrawy (EGY); Fares Ferjani (TUN); Shirwit Gaber (EGY); Salim Heroui (ALG)	Mixed team	Americas 2 L 20–30	Did not advance			9

== Gymnastics ==
=== Artistic ===
Algeria qualified one athlete based on its performance at the 2014 African Artistic Gymnastics Championships.

Girls

Athlete	Event	Apparatus				Total	Rank
Athlete	Event	F	V	UB	BB	Total	Rank
Fatima Mokhtari	Qualification	7.750	12.550	3.325	9.500	33.125	40

== Judo ==
Algeria qualified two athletes based on its performance at the 2013 Cadet World Judo Championships.

Individual

Athlete	Event	Round of 32	Round of 16	Quarterfinals	Semifinals	Rep 1	Rep 2	Rep 3	Rep 4	Final / BM	Rank
Athlete	Event	Opposition Result	Opposition Result	Opposition Result	Opposition Result	Opposition Result	Opposition Result	Opposition Result	Opposition Result	Opposition Result	Rank
Salim Rebahi	Boys' −66 kg	Manzi (ITA); L 0002–000	Did not advance			—N/a	Wawrzyczek (POL); L 0002–0101	Did not advance			17
Sadjia Amrane	Girls' −52 kg	—N/a	Mbazoghe (GAB); W 101–0002	Temelkova (BUL); L 0002–000	Did not advance	—N/a		Lee (KOR); L 0001–1012	Did not advance		9

Team

Athletes	Event	Round of 16	Quarterfinals	Semifinals	Final	Rank
Athletes	Event	Opposition Result	Opposition Result	Opposition Result	Opposition Result	Rank
Team Nevzorov; Mihanta Andriamifehy (MAD); Brigitte Carabalí (COL); Nicolas Grinda (MON); Bryan Jolly (AUS); Tamazi Kirakozashvili (GEO); Salim Rebahi (ALG); Aleksandra Samardzic (BIH)	Mixed team	Bye	Team Douillet (MIX); L 2 – 5	Did not advance		5
Team Ruska; Sadjia Amrane (ALG); Jose Basile (BRA); Harutyun Dermishyan (ARM); Szabina Gercsák (HUN); Lovro Kovac (CRO); Kamila Pasternak (POL); Julian Sancho (CRC); Betina Temelkova (BUL)	Mixed team	Bye	Team Rouge (MIX); L 2 – 5	Did not advance		5

== Rowing ==
Algeria qualified two boats based on its performance at the African Qualification Regatta.

Athlete	Event	Heats		Repechage		Semifinals		Final	
Athlete	Event	Time	Rank	Time	Rank	Time	Rank	Time	Rank
Boucif Mohammed Belhadj	Boys' single sculls	3:47.18	5 R	3:39.77	4 SC/D	3:41.68	5 FD	3:47.99	21
Thiziri Douki	Girls' single sculls	4:30.10	6 R	4:25.32	5 SC/D	4:27.52	5 FD	4:32.59	22

Qualification Legend: FA=Final A (medal); FB=Final B (non-medal); FC=Final C (non-medal); FD=Final D (non-medal); SA/B=Semifinals A/B; SC/D=Semifinals C/D; R=Repechage

== Sailing ==
Algeria qualified one boat based on its performance at the Byte CII African Continental Qualifier. Later they were given a reallocation spot based on being a top ranked nation not yet qualified.

Athlete	Event	Race											Net Points	Final Rank
Athlete	Event	1	2	3	4	5	6	7	8	9	10	M*	Net Points	Final Rank
Amine Guedmim	Boys' Byte CII	20	25	23	13	~~31~~	22	23	CAN	CAN	CAN	25	151	26
Nouha Akil	Girls' Byte CII	26	~~27~~	27	25	25	19	24	CAN	CAN	CAN	26	172	29

== Swimming ==
Algeria qualified one swimmer.

Girls

Athlete	Event	Heat		Final	
Athlete	Event	Time	Rank	Time	Rank
Hamida Nefsi	200 m butterfly	2:29.20	25	Did not advance	
Hamida Nefsi	200 m individual medley	2:26.30	27	Did not advance	

== Table tennis ==
Algeria qualified one athlete based on its performance at the African Qualification Event.

Singles

Athlete	Event	Group stage				Round of 16	Quarterfinals	Semifinals	Final / BM	
Athlete	Event	Opposition Score	Opposition Score	Opposition Score	Rank	Opposition Score	Opposition Score	Opposition Score	Opposition Score	Rank
Sannah Lagsir	Girls	Khetkuan (THA); L 8–11, 3–11, 5–11	Yee (SIN); W 11–5, 11–7, 8–11, 11–7	Luo (CAN); L 7–11, 11–13, 10–12	3 qB	Consolation round Kim (UZB); W 11–8, 11–9, 10–12, 11–9	Consolation round Imre (HUN); L 10–12, 15–13, 10–12, 8–11	Did not advance		21

Team

Athlete	Event	Group stage				Round of 16	Quarterfinals	Semifinals	Final / BM	
Athlete	Event	Opposition Score	Opposition Score	Opposition Score	Rank	Opposition Score	Opposition Score	Opposition Score	Opposition Score	Rank
Africa 1 Sannah Lagsir (ALG); Kerem Ben Yahia (TUN)	Mixed	Wan (GER); Ort (GER); L 0–3	Piccolin (ITA); Schmid (SUI); L 0–3	Lorenzotti (URU); Calderano (BRA); L 0–3	4 qB	Consolation round Imre (HUN); Szudi (HUN); L 0–2	Did not advance			25

Qualification Legend: Q=Main Bracket (medal); qB=Consolation Bracket (non-medal)

== Weightlifting ==
Algeria qualified 1 quota in the boys' and girls' events based on the team ranking after the 2014 Weightlifting Junior & Youth African Championships.

Boys

Athlete	Event	Snatch		Clean & jerk		Total	Rank
Athlete	Event	Result	Rank	Result	Rank	Total	Rank
Aymen Touairi	+85 kg	133	5	171	6	304	6

Girls

Athlete	Event	Snatch		Clean & jerk		Total	Rank
Athlete	Event	Result	Rank	Result	Rank	Total	Rank
Meryem Benmiloud	−58 kg	66	7	82	7	148	7

== Wrestling ==
Algeria qualified three athletes based on its performance at the 2014 African Cadet Championships.

Key:

- VT - Victory by Fall.
- PP - Decision by Points - the loser with technical points.
- PO - Decision by Points - the loser without technical points.

Boys' Greco-Roman

Athlete	Event	Group stage				Final / RM	Rank
Athlete	Event	Opposition Score	Opposition Score	Opposition Score	Rank	Opposition Score	Rank
Habib Belghelam	−42 kg	Leilua (ASA); W 4–0	Masyk (UKR); L 1–3	Aslan (TUR); L 0–4	3	5th place match Perez (MEX); L 0–4 ^{VT}	6
Houssem Bounasri	−50 kg	Bakhromov (UZB); L 0–4	Muller (MHL); W 4–0	Correa (BRA); W 4–0	2	Bronze-medal match Aghaniachari (IRI); L 0–3 ^{PO}	4

Girls' freestyle

Athlete	Event	Group stage				Final / RM	Rank
Athlete	Event	Opposition Score	Opposition Score	Opposition Score	Rank	Opposition Score	Rank
Khadidja Kadour	−46 kg	Castillo (VEN); L 0–4	Bolormaa (MGL); L 0–4	Roik (BLR); W 4–0	3	5th place match Bramley (NZL); W 4–0 ^{VT}	5
