= Rattanaphon Pakkaratha =

Thai weightlifter

Personal information
- Born: 14 June 1997 (age 29)
- Weight: 52.97 kg (116.8 lb)

Sport
- Country: Thailand
- Sport: Weightlifting
- Team: National team
- Updated on 21 July 2016

Rattanaphon Pakkaratha (born 14 June 1997) is a Thai female weightlifter, competing in the 53 kg category and representing Thailand at international competitions.

She won a gold medal at the 2014 Summer Youth Olympic Games. She competed at world championships, at the 2015 World Weightlifting Championships.

== Major results ==
Year	Venue	Weight	Snatch (kg)				Clean & Jerk (kg)				Total	Rank
Year	Venue	Weight	1	2	3	Rank	1	2	3	Rank	Total	Rank
World Championships
2015	Houston, United States	53 kg	83	86	89	7	111	~~116~~	116	4	205	5
