= Jong Chun-hui =

North Korean weightlifter (born 1998)

Personal information
- Born: 4 March 1998 (age 28)
- Weight: 52.44 kg (115.6 lb)

Sport
- Country: North Korea
- Sport: Weightlifting
- Weight class: 71 kg
- Team: National team
Medal record
Women's weightlifting
Representing North Korea
World Championships
Silver medal – second place	2024 Manama	71 kg
Asian Games
Silver medal – second place	2022 Hangzhou	76 kg
Asian Championships
Gold medal – first place	2024 Tashkent	76 kg
FISU World University Games
Bronze medal – third place	2017 Taipei	69 kg
Youth Olympic Games
Silver medal – second place	2014 Nanjing	53 kg

Korean name
- Hangul: 정춘희
- RR: Jeong Chunhui
- MR: Chŏng Ch'unhŭi
- Updated on 9 November 2016

Jong Chun-hui (born 4 March 1998) is a North Korean weightlifter, who competes in the 71 kg category and represents North Korea at international competitions.

As a junior, she won the silver medal at the 2014 Summer Youth Olympics.

== Major results ==
Year	Venue	Weight	Snatch (kg)				Clean & Jerk (kg)				Total	Rank
Year	Venue	Weight	1	2	3	Rank	1	2	3	Rank	Total	Rank
Summer Youth Olympics
2014	Nanjing, China	53 kg	77	81	~~82~~	---	95	100	~~105~~	---	181	2nd place, silver medalist(s)
Summer Universiade
2017	New Taipei, Taiwan	69 kg	~~97~~	97	~~101~~	---	117	121	~~125~~	---	121	3rd place, bronze medalist(s)
