= Turkmenistan at the 2014 Summer Youth Olympics =

- IOC code: TKM
- NOC: National Olympic Committee of Turkmenistan

in Nanjing
- Competitors: 3 in 3 sports
- Flag bearer: Muhammet Rozykulyyev
- Medals: Gold 0 Silver 0 Bronze 0 Total 0

Summer Youth Olympics appearances (overview)
- 2010; 2014; 2018

Turkmenistan competed at the 2014 Summer Youth Olympics, in Nanjing, China from 16 August to 28 August 2014.

== Swimming ==
Turkmenistan qualified one swimmer.

Girls

Athlete	Event	Heat		Semifinal		Final	
Athlete	Event	Time	Rank	Time	Rank	Time	Rank
Merjen Saryýewa	50 m freestyle	29.50	39	did not advance			
Merjen Saryýewa	50 m butterfly	31.49	30	did not advance			

== Weightlifting ==
Turkmenistan was given a quota to compete in a boys' event by the tripartite committee.

Boys

Athlete	Event	Snatch		Clean & jerk		Total	Rank
Athlete	Event	Result	Rank	Result	Rank	Total	Rank
Söhbet Tirkişow	−62 kg	115	3	137	5	252	4

== Wrestling ==
Turkmenistan was given a spot to compete from the Tripartite Commission.

Key:
- VT - Victory by Fall.
- PP - Decision by Points - the loser with technical points.
- PO - Decision by Points - the loser without technical points.

Boys

Athlete	Event	Group stage				Final / RM	Rank
Athlete	Event	Opposition Score	Opposition Score	Opposition Score	Rank	Opposition Score	Rank
Muhammet Rozykuliýew	Freestyle -100kg	F Yakubov (TJK); L 1 – 3	D Ceacusta (MDA); L 0 – 4	B Pratt (AUS); W 4 – 0	3 Q	R Filho (BRA); W 4 – 1 ^{ST}	5
