= Sierra Leone at the 2014 Summer Youth Olympics =

- IOC code: SLE
- NOC: National Olympic Committee of Sierra Leone

Summer Youth Olympics appearances
- 2010; 2014; 2018

Sierra Leone was planning to participate at the 2014 Summer Youth Olympics, in Nanjing, China, but on 13 August 2014 they pulled out of the games due to pressure from Chinese Authorities in an attempt to prevent Ebola from West Africa from entering their nation. (see 2014 Ebola virus epidemic in Sierra Leone)

== Beach Volleyball ==
Sierra Leone qualified a boys' and girls' team by their performance at the CAVB Qualification Tournament.

Athletes	Event	Preliminary round	Standing	Round of 24	Round of 16	Quarterfinals	Semifinals	Final / BM	Rank
Athletes	Event	Opposition Score	Standing	Opposition Score	Opposition Score	Opposition Score	Opposition Score	Opposition Score	Rank
Abubaker Kamara; Patrick Lombi	Boys'	Withdrew							
Kadiatu Conteh; Aminata Turay	Girls'	Withdrew							

== Swimming ==
Sierra Leone qualified one swimmer.

Boys

Athlete	Event	Heat		Semifinal		Final	
Athlete	Event	Time	Rank	Time	Rank	Time	Rank
Saidu Kamara	50 m freestyle	Withdrew					

== Weightlifting ==
Sierra Leone was given a quota to compete in a boys' event by the tripartite committee.

Boys

Athlete	Event	Snatch		Clean & jerk		Total	Rank
Athlete	Event	Result	Rank	Result	Rank	Total	Rank
Abu Kamara	−56 kg	Withdrew					
