= Nanjing International Expo Center =

- 南京国际博览中心
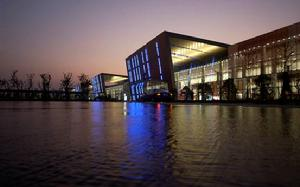
- Interactive map of the Nanjing International Expo Center area

General information
- Type: Exposition center
- Location: Center of Hexi New Town, No.199 Yan Shan Road, Jianye District, Nanjing, Jiangsu Province, China
- Coordinates: 31.9954°N 118.7097°E
- Owner: Nanjing Hexi New Town State-owned Assets Management Group Holdings Limited

Technical details
- Floor count: 2

Design and construction
- Architect: tvsdesign

Website
- http://www.nanjingexpo.com.cn/exportal/index.asp

Nanjing International Expo Center (Chinese: 南京国际博览中心; pinyin: Nánjīng guójì bólǎn zhōngxīn) is an exposition center and also a landmark in Nanjing, Jiangsu Province, China. It has an exposition area of 120,000 square meters. The Expo Center facilities include six exposition pavilions, 38 conference rooms (20 conference rooms are in the Conference Center) and a multi-function pavilion, and it is capable of hosting exhibitions with over 4,500 international standard large-scale exhibition booths. Two more exposition pavilions, a business hotel and a conference center hotel are planned.

Nanjing International Expo Center has hosted a large number of expositions, including The 6th World Chinese Entrepreneur Convention, The 6th International Retailers' Sourcing Fair & China Sourcing Fair, and the annual meeting of BASF-YPC Co. Ltd. On December 12, 2011, Nanjing International Expo Center won The Top 10 Brands of the Year among Chinese convention and exhibition centers in the annual meeting of the Chinese exhibition industry which was held in Guangzhou.

== Project planning ==
The first phase of Nanjing International Expo Center is completed. The project has a total construction area of 180,000 square meters, including six single-floor exposition pavilions, a conference centre and office centre. The area of every pavilion is approximately 21000 square meters. Every pavilion can be flexibly divided to adapt to the requirement for different expositions. Most of them are single-floor wide buildings, and some of them have a second floor.

The second phase of the Nanjing International Expo Center is still under construction and including a business hotel and a conference center hotel. The area of the business hotel is approximately 8,000 square meters, and will have nearly 300 hotel rooms. It will have an underground parking garage, an entrance lobby and a dining hall on the ground floor.

== Management ==
The Nanjing Hexi Convention & Exhibition Co., Ltd. is a joint venture of the Nanjing Hexi New Town State-owned Assets Management Group Holdings Limited and Nanjing Olympic Construction and Development Co., Ltd. It takes overall responsibility for the day-to-day management and operation of the Nanjing International Expo Center, which includes administration, security, marketing, scheduling, booking, maintenance, and dining.

== Design concept ==
The Center was designed by tvsdesign, an American design company which also designed the Knight Theater (Charlotte, North Carolina, US) and Dubai Creek (UAE). According to the company, it spatially represents an integration of the mountains, water, city and trees and the unique style of "Curling Dragon, Crouching Tiger" in Nanjing.

== Technical parameters ==
The total power capacity of every pavilion is 2800 kW. Telephone and Internet is available to every booth. Each pavilion has 162 water supply points and 81 drain pipes. The discharge channels between B hall and C hall, D hall and E hall are 180m long and 30m wide. The area of outdoor exhibition space is 30,000 m^{2}. It is divided into six different exhibition areas. From south to north, the areas are 2000 m^{2}, 4000 m^{2}, 5000 m^{2}, 5000 m^{2}, 4000 m^{2}and 10,000 m^{2}.

== Events ==
Since 1988, various events have been held at the convention centre, including:

- Search Marketing Expo, September 23–24, 2008
- The World Urban Forum IV, November 3, 2008
- The 5th China Expo Forum for International Cooperation, January 14–16, 2009
- Herbalife (China) Sales Conference, October, 2009
- The 12th China-EU Summit, November 30, 2009
- The 3rd China (Nanjing) International Automobile Expo, June 4–8, 2010
- The 3rd China International Service Outsourcing Cooperation Conference, June 11–12, 2010
- The Seventh XiCi Wedding Expo and The 2012 Yangtze River Delta Carnival, March 4, 2012

== Activity introductions ==
China World Logistics Conference

From November 19 to November 20, 2008, China World Logistics Conference was held in Nanjing International Expo Center. The organizers include China Council for the Promotion of International Trade, China International Talent Exchange Foundation and American Society of Transportation & Logistics. Topics such as Intra-China logistics, dangerous goods transportation, logistics technology, cargo security, cold chain logistics, the logistics talent shortage crisis, business strategies for Small Medium size logistics companies are concerned in the conference.

The Second Nanjing COODJOB Amine

On March 4, 2012, the Second Nanjing GOODJOB Amine was held in A museum in Nanjing International Expo Center. The audience was satisfied with the comfortable environment. The aisles between the booths are large enough, so it is very convenient whether shopping or taking pictures. The highlight of the exhibition was the appearance of alpaca, which is called as "God beast" and the performance in stage area.

The Seventh XiCi Wedding Expo and The 2012 Yangtze River Delta Carnival

From March 10 to March 11, 2012, the Seventh XiCi Wedding Expo and The 2012 Yangtze River Delta Carnival were held in Nanjing International Expo Center. In two days, the scene of the participants exceeded the number of 11 million passengers with more than 20,000 orders, and transaction volume was more than 180 million yuan. Besides, Li Qi, the Vice Mayor of Nanjing, Lv jijian, the Deputy Director of the Ministry of Commerce Trade and Business Services, and other leaders attended the opening ceremony on the tenth of March.

CCMT 2012 The Seventh China Numerical Control Expo

On April 16, 2012, The Seventh China Numerical Control Expo was held in a museum in Nanjing International Expo Center by China Machine Tool & Tool Builders' Association(CMBTA). The opening ceremony began at 10 o'clock in the morning, host by Wang Liming, vice president and general secretary of CMBTA.Experts in numerical control, enterprisers and leaders of governments and associations gathered together. The mayor of Nanjing Ji Jianye attended the opening ceremony and cut the ribbon for the Expo. The vice major Li Qi delivered a speech at the ceremony. After the opening ceremony, they visited the Expo.

Green Theme—The 2012 Exhibition of International Passenger Cars and Mechanical Parts

On March 23–25, 2012, The 2012 Exhibition of China (Nanjing) International Passenger Cars and Mechanical Parts was held in Nanjing International Expo Center by the China Urban Public Transportation Association, China Tourism Vehicle Cruise Association etc. Besides, Tianjin Bus Group, Hangzhou Bus Group, Kunming Bus Group, Dalian Bus Passenger Transport Group, Ningbo Bus Head Office, Nanjing Bus Parent Company jointly hosted it. There are 26 domestic coach mainstream enterprises and more than 100 well-known parts enterprises participate in the exhibition. During the exhibition, these participated enterprises displayed all kinds of bus, tourist buses, new energy coaches, and engine, transmission, axles and brake, slow speed device, air conditioning, tires, new energy bus power battery, motor, electric, car door, automatic lubrication, and various kinds of intelligent electronic bus parts. The area of the exhibition was about 20000 square meters. During the exhibition, the organizing committee also held other activities. In addition, the exhibitors at the fair will also hold new product launches and business activities, for expanding their enterprise brand culture and market development impact.

== Location ==
Nanjing International Expo Center located in the center of Hexi New City. Opposite of it is Hexi Business District. It takes 30 minutes to get to Xinshengwei 10-thousand-ton Port, LuKou International Airport Expressway, and Shanghai-Nanjing Expressway.

== Transportation ==
The expo center is accessible within walking distance south west of Yuantong Station of Nanjing Metro.
