= Gymnastics at the 2014 Summer Youth Olympics – Boys' rings =

Boys' Rings at the II Summer Youth Olympic Games
- Venue: Nanjing Olympic Sports Center Gymnasium
- Date: 23 August
- Competitors: 8 from 8 nations
- Winning score: 14.000

Medalists
1st place, gold medalist(s)		Nikita Nagornyy	Russia
2nd place, silver medalist(s)		Ma Yue	China
3rd place, bronze medalist(s)		Vladyslav Hryko	Ukraine

The Boy's rings event final for the 2014 Summer Youth Olympics took place on the 23rd of August at Nanjing Olympic Sports Center Gymnasium.

== Medalists ==
Gold	Silver	Bronze
Nikita Nagornyy; Russia	Ma Yue; China	Vladyslav Hryko; Ukraine

== Qualification ==
The top eight gymnasts from qualification advanced into the final – with the exception to Vigen Khachatryan, who placed fourth during qualifications. He had problems with his back did not perform on the parallel bars or horizontal bar. With the performance on all apparatus being a requirement for gymnasts at the YOG, Khachatryan was not eligible to advance to the finals.

== Results ==
Rank	Gymnast	D-score	E-score	Penalty	Total
Gold medal	Nikita Nagornyy (RUS)	5.3	8.700		14.000
Silver medal	Ma Yue (CHN)	5.4	8.466		13.866
Bronze medal	Vladyslav Hryko (UKR)	4.7	8.833		13.533
4	Vladimir Tushev (BUL)	4.8	8.700		13.500
5	Botond Kardos (HUN)	4.8	8.566		13.366
6	Ilya Yakauleu (BLR)	4.8	8.433		13.233
7	Zachari Hrimeche (FRA)	4.6	8.416		13.016
8	Lim Myongwoo (KOR)	4.6	8.133		12.733

Reserves

The following gymnasts were reserves for the final:

- Giarnni Regini-Moran (GBR)
- Nils Dunkel (GER)
- Igor Takac (SVK)
