= Gymnastics at the 2014 Summer Youth Olympics – Boys' artistic qualification =

Boys' artistic gymnastics qualification at the 2014 Summer Youth Olympics was held at the Nanjing Olympic Sports Centre on August 17. The results of the qualification determined the qualifiers to the finals: 18 gymnasts in the all-around final, and eight gymnasts in each of four apparatus finals.

== Start list ==
Floor (gymnastics)	Pommel horse	Rings (gymnastics)
Subdivision 1
Canada	Sweden	Kazakhstan
Slovakia	Colombia	Armenia
Peru	Panama	Germany
Morocco	China	South Africa
Greece	Brazil	Belgium
Iceland	Australia	Mexico
France	Malaysia	Russia
Subdivision 2
Japan	Belarus	Egypt
Switzerland	Cyprus	Finland
Austria	Thailand	Hungary
Puerto Rico	South Korea	United Kingdom
Jordan	India	Uzbekistan
Ukraine	Vietnam	Bulgaria
Croatia		United States

== Results ==
Note: On vault, the rankings are determined by the score of their first vault, the vault that counts toward their all-around total. Qualification into the vault final is based on the average of two vaults.

Gymnast	Floor Exercise		Pommel Horse		Rings		Vault		Parallel Bars		Horizontal Bar		Total (All-around)	
Gymnast	Score	Rank	Score	Rank	Score	Rank	Score	Rank	Score	Rank	Score	Rank	Score	Rank
Giarnni Regini-Moran (GBR)	14.700	1	13.700	5	13.250	10	14.950	1	14.300	1	13.500	4	84.400	1
Nikita Nagornyy (RUS)	13.900	6	13.900	2	13.900	3	13.950	17	14.050	3	13.800	2	83.500	2
Botond Kardos (HUN)	14.050	2	13.775	4	13.450	5	14.550	3	14.050	2	13.400	7	83.250	3
Vladyslav Hyrko (UKR)	13.700	10	14.150	1	13.300	9	14.100	14	13.300	11	13.150	9	81.700	4
Kenya Yuasa (JPN)	13.950	5	12.400	21	13.050	18	14.100	14	13.900	4	13.800	1	81.200	5
Alec Yoder (USA)	13.250	15	13.800	3	13.150	14	14.300	9	13.600	5	12.450	22	80.550	6
Zachari Hrimeche (FRA)	13.850	7	12.650	18	13.350	7	13.850	22	13.300	9	13.500	6	80.500	7
Ma Yue (CHN)	13.650	11	13.450	10	14.250	1	14.300	9	13.100	12	11.700	28	80.475	8
Nils Dunkel (GER)	12.750	25	13.400	11	13.200	11	14.150	13	13.400	7	13.050	11	79.950	9
Artem Dolgopyat (ISR)	13.975	4	13.100	13	12.600	25	14.450	4	12.500	25	12.900	16	79.525	10
Luka Van Den Keybus (BEL)	13.600	14	12.550	20	12.900	20	13.775	24	13.300	9	13.250	8	79.375	11
Marco Pfyl (SUI)	13.650	12	13.050	14	13.150	13	13.800	23	13.300	8	12.000	27	78.950	12
Andrés Martínez (COL)	13.650	13	11.550	29	12.425	26	13.900	20	12.650	20	13.500	5	77.675	13
Mohamed Elhamy Aly (EGY)	13.700	9	10.650	37	12.925	19	14.250	12	13.000	14	12.950	13	77.475	14
Igor Takac (SVK)	12.950	21	13.100	12	13.200	11	12.550	38	12.500	23	12.950	14	77.250	15
Phay Xing Loo (MAS)	13.150	18	13.500	9	11.500	30	12.800	36	13.575	6	12.500	20	77.025	16
Yerbol Jantykov (KAZ)	13.100	20	12.250	23	12.950	17	14.600	37	13.700	10	13.150	22	76.750	17
Vladimir Tushev (BUL)	12.850	24	12.600	19	13.950	2	13.300	30	12.675	18	11.300	33	76.675	18
René Cournoyer (CAN)	12.650	29	10.750	36	12.950	18	14.300	9	12.000	27	13.650	3	76.300	19
Emil Soravuo (FIN)	13.200	16	10.950	33	12.700	24	14.400	7	12.500	23	12.450	21	76.200	20
Jakov Vlahek (CRO)	12.875	23	13.650	7	11.450	31	12.950	34	12.975	17	12.150	26	76.050	21
Kjell Kim Vanstrom (SWE)	12.550	21	11.850	26	12.150	28	13.400	29	12.950	16	12.350	23	75.250	22
Clay Mason Stephans (AUS)	11.900	37	10.500	38	12.850	21	14.700	2	13.050	13	11.650	29	74.650	23
Nattipong Aeadwong (THA)	13.200	17	13.000	15	12.000	29	13.950	17	11.400	31	11.050	36	74.600	24
Johannes Mairoser (AUT)	11.650	39	11.050	32	12.800	22	13.300	30	12.900	17	12.850	17	74.550	25
Abhijeet Kumar (IND)	12.650	27	13.000	16	10.000	30	13.600	28	12.650	21	12.250	24	74.150	26
Ilya Yakauleu (BLR)	13.100	19	9.075	39	13.450	4	13.900	20	11.300	33	13.150	10	73.975	27
Lim Myongwoo (KOR)	13.750	8	11.400	30	13.300	9	13.150	33	9.100	38	13.050	12	73.750	28
Timur Kadirov (UZB)	11.450	30	13.700	6	11.450	33	14.100	14	11.350	32	11.600	30	73.650	29
Andres Perez Gines (PUR)	12.150	36	11.100	31	10.850	37	13.950	17	12.675	19	12.900	15	73.625	30
O.C. De Goncalves (BRA)	12.600	30	12.325	22	11.250	34	13.700	26	11.000	35	12.750	18	73.625	31
Antonios Tantalidis (GRE)	12.900	22	11.800	27	12.950	16	13.775	24	11.550	29	10.550	37	73.525	32
Yazan Abendeh (JOR)	12.650	28	11.750	28	11.000	35	13.650	27	12.400	26	11.050	35	72.500	33
Dinh Vuong Tran (VIE)	12.400	32	10.800	34	12.800	23	12.550	38	11.675	28	12.200	25	72.450	34
Luis Pizarro Silva (PER)	12.750	26	12.100	25	10.900	36	12.600	37	10.800	36	11.500	32	70.650	35
Muhammad Mia (RSA)	12.150	35	12.150	24	10.800	38	12.150	41	9.750	37	11.300	34	68.300	36
Kevin Espinosa Castillo (PAN)	10.650	41	10.800	35	11.450	32	12.200	40	11.250	34	11.500	31	67.850	37
Patricio Razo Padillo (MEX)	12.150	34	5.550	41	12.275	27	14.450	4	11.400	30	9.625	39	65.450	38
Hamza Hajjaji (MAR)	11.850	38	7.750	40	2.250	41	12.850	35	8.750	39	9.650	38	53.100	39

=== Vault ===
Q= qualified R=reserve

Rank	Gymnast	#	A-score	B-score	Penalty	Average	Total
1	Giarnni Regini-Moran (GBR)	1	5.6	9.350	−	14.950	14.800 Q
1	Giarnni Regini-Moran (GBR)	2	5.2	9.450	−	14.650	14.800 Q
2	Nikita Nagornyy (RUS)	1	5.6	8.350	−	13.950	14.425 Q
2	Nikita Nagornyy (RUS)	2	5.6	9.300	−	14.900	14.425 Q
3	Vigen Khachatryan (ARM)	1	5.2	9.250	−	14.450	14.425
3	Vigen Khachatryan (ARM)	2	5.2	9.200	−	14.400	14.425
4	Ma Yue (CHN)	1	5.2	9.200	0.1	14.300	14.400 Q
4	Ma Yue (CHN)	2	5.2	9.300	−	14.500	14.400 Q
5	Clay Mason Stephans (AUS)	1	5.2	9.500	−	14.700	14.375 Q
5	Clay Mason Stephans (AUS)	2	4.8	9.250	−	14.050	14.375 Q
6	René Cournoyer (CAN)	1	5.6	8.700	−	14.300	14.350 Q
6	René Cournoyer (CAN)	2	5.2	9.150	−	14.350	14.350 Q
7	Mohamed Elhamy Aly (EGY)	1	5.2	9.050	−	14.250	14.275 Q
7	Mohamed Elhamy Aly (EGY)	2	5.6	8.700	−	14.300	14.275 Q
8	Artem Dolgopyart (ISR)	1	5.2	9.250	−	14.450	14.125 Q
8	Artem Dolgopyart (ISR)	2	4.8	9.000	−	13.800	14.125 Q
9	Emil Soravuo (FIN)	1	5.2	9.200	−	14.400	14.100 Q
9	Emil Soravuo (FIN)	2	4.4	9.400	−	13.800	14.100 Q
10	Marios Georgiou (CYP)	1	5.2	9.225	0.1	14.325	14.087
10	Marios Georgiou (CYP)	2	4.8	9.150	0.1	13.850	14.087
11	Patricio Razo Padillo (MEX)	1	5.2	9.250	−	14.450	14.025 R
11	Patricio Razo Padillo (MEX)	2	4.4	9.200	−	13.600	14.025 R
12	Nattipong Aeadwong (THA)	1	5.2	8.750	−	13.950	14.025 R
12	Nattipong Aeadwong (THA)	2	5.2	8.900	−	14.100	14.025 R
13	Marco Pfyl (SUI)	1	5.2	8.600	−	13.800	13.875 R
13	Marco Pfyl (SUI)	2	4.8	9.150	−	13.950	13.875 R
14	Andrés Martínez (COL)	1	5.2	8.700	−	13.900	13.725
14	Andrés Martínez (COL)	2	4.8	9.050	0.3	13.550	13.725
15	Zachari Hrimeche (FRA)	1	5.6	8.250	−	13.850	13.625
15	Zachari Hrimeche (FRA)	2	5.2	8.200	−	13.400	13.625
16	Kenya Yuasa (JPN)	1	5.2	9.200	0.3	14.100	13.550
16	Kenya Yuasa (JPN)	2	3.6	9.400	−	13.000	13.550
17	Alec Yoder (USA)	1	5.2	9.100	−	14.300	13.087
17	Alec Yoder (USA)	2	3.2	8.675	−	11.875	13.087
18	Yazan Abendeh (JOR)	1	5.2	8.550	0.1	13.650	12.875
18	Yazan Abendeh (JOR)	2	3.2	8.900	−	12.100	12.875
19	Abhijeet Kumar (IND)	1	4.4	9.200	−	13.600	12.862
19	Abhijeet Kumar (IND)	2	3.2	8.925	−	12.125	12.862
