= Gymnastics at the 2014 Summer Youth Olympics – Boys' floor =

Boys' Floor at the II Summer Youth Olympic Games
- Venue: Nanjing Olympic Sports Center Gymnasium
- Date: 23 August
- Competitors: 8 from 8 nations
- Winning score: 14.766

Medalists
1st place, gold medalist(s)		Giarnni Regini-Moran	Great Britain
2nd place, silver medalist(s)		Kenya Yuasa	Japan
3rd place, bronze medalist(s)		Myongwoo Lim	South Korea

The Boy's floor event final for the 2014 Summer Youth Olympics took place on the 23rd of August at Nanjing Olympic Sports Center Gymnasium.

== Medalists ==
Gold	Silver	Bronze
Giarnni Regini-Moran; Great Britain	Kenya Yuasa; Japan	Myongwoo Lim; South Korea

== Qualification ==
The top eight gymnasts from qualification advanced into the final – with exception to Vigen Khachatryan, who placed third during qualifications. He had problems with his back did not perform on the parallel bars or horizontal bar. With the performance on all apparatus being a requirement for gymnasts at the YOG, Khachatryan was not eligible to advance to the finals.

== Results ==
Rank	Gymnast	D-score	E-score	Penalty	Total
Gold medal	Giarnni Regini-Moran (GBR)	5.8	8.966		14.766
Silver medal	Kenya Yuasa (JPN)	4.8	9.333		14.133
Bronze medal	Myongwoo Lim (KOR)	5.0	8.766		13.766
4	Nikita Nagornyy (RUS)	5.5	8.300	-0.1	13.700
5	Mohamed Elhamy Aly (EGY)	4.7	8.916		13.616
6	Botond Kardos (HUN)	5.4	8.033		13.433
7	Zachari Hrimeche (FRA)	5.5	8.066	-0.3	13.266
8	Artem Dolgopyat (ISR)	5.5	7.866	-0.1	13.266

Reserves

The following gymnasts were reserves for the boys floor final:

- Vladyslav Hryko (UKR)
- Ma Yue (CHN)
- Marco Pfyl (SUI)
