= Gymnastics at the 2014 Summer Youth Olympics – Boys' horizontal bar =

Boys' Horizontal Bar at the II Summer Youth Olympic Games
- Venue: Nanjing Olympic Sports Center Gymnasium
- Date: 24 August
- Competitors: 8 from 8 nations
- Winning score: 13.700

Medalists
1st place, gold medalist(s)		Kenya Yuasa	Japan
2nd place, silver medalist(s)		Luka Van Den Keybus	Belgium
3rd place, bronze medalist(s)		Giarnni Regini-Moran	Great Britain

The Boy's horizontal bar event final for the 2014 Summer Youth Olympics took place on the 24th of August at Nanjing Olympic Sports Center Gymnasium.

== Medalists ==
Gold	Silver	Bronze
Kenya Yuasa; Japan	Luka Van Den Keybus; Belgium	Giarnni Regini-Moran; Great Britain

== Qualification ==
The top eight gymnasts from qualification advanced into the final.

== Results ==
Rank	Gymnast	D-score	E-score	Penalty	Total
Gold medal	Kenya Yuasa (JPN)	5.0	8.700		13.700
Silver medal	Luka Van Den Keybus (BEL)	4.9	8.766		13.666
Bronze medal	Giarnni Regini-Moran (GBR)	4.7	8.933		13.633
4	Zachari Hrimeche (FRA)	5.2	8.433		13.633
5	Andrés Martínez (COL)	5.0	8.266		13.266
6	Botond Kardos (HUN)	4.8	8.366		13.166
7	René Cournoyer (CAN)	4.7	7.633		12.333
8	Nikita Nagornyy (RUS)	4.7	7.300		12.000

Reserves

The following gymnasts were reserves for the final:

- Vladyslav Hryko (UKR)
- Ilya Yakauleu (BLR)
- Nils Dunkel (GER)
