= Gymnastics at the 2014 Summer Youth Olympics – Boys' pommel horse =

Boys' Pommel Horse at the II Summer Youth Olympic Games
- Venue: Nanjing Olympic Sports Center Gymnasium
- Date: 23 August
- Competitors: 8 from 8 nations
- Winning score: 13.966

Medalists
1st place, gold medalist(s)		Nikita Nagornyy	Russia
2nd place, silver medalist(s)		Vladyslav Hryko	Ukraine
3rd place, bronze medalist(s)		Timur Kadirov	Uzbekistan

The Boy's pommel horse event final for the 2014 Summer Youth Olympics took place on the 23rd of August at Nanjing Olympic Sports Center Gymnasium.

== Medalists ==
Gold	Silver	Bronze
Nikita Nagornyy; Russia	Vladyslav Hryko; Ukraine	Timur Kadirov; Uzbekistan

== Qualification ==
The top eight gymnasts from qualification advanced into the final – with exception to Marios Georgiou, who placed eighth during qualifications. He suffered a finger injury and withdrew from the competition.

== Results ==
Rank	Gymnast	D-score	E-score	Penalty	Total
Gold medal	Nikita Nagornyy (RUS)	5.3	8.666		13.966
Silver medal	Vladyslav Hryko (UKR)	5.7	8.233		13.933
Bronze medal	Timur Kadirov (UZB)	5.6	8.200		13.800
4	Botond Kardos (HUN)	5.0	8.566		13.566
5	Jakov Vlahek (CRO)	5.0	8.533		13.533
6	Giarnni Regini-Moran (GBR)	5.2	8.200		13.400
7	Alec Yoder (USA)	5.6	7.300		12.900
8	Loo Phay Xing (MAS)	5.3	7.566		12.866

Reserves

The following gymnasts were reserves for the final:

- Ma Yue (CHN)
- Nils Dunkel (GER)
- Igor Takac (SVK)
