= Gymnastics at the 2014 Summer Youth Olympics – Boys' artistic individual all-around =

Boys' All-Around at the II Summer Youth Olympic Games
- Venue: Nanjing Olympic Sports Center Gymnasium
- Date: 19 August
- Competitors: 18 from 18 nations
- Winning score: 84.725

Medalists
1st place, gold medalist(s)		Giarnni Regini-Moran	Great Britain
2nd place, silver medalist(s)		Nikita Nagornyy	Russia
3rd place, bronze medalist(s)		Alec Yoder	United States

The boys' artistic individual all-around at the 2014 Summer Youth Olympics was held on August 19 at the Nanjing Olympic Sports Centre.

== Qualification ==
Eighteen gymnasts qualified into the all-around final.

== Medalists ==
Gold	Silver	Bronze
Giarnni Regini-Moran; Great Britain	Nikita Nagornyy; Russia	Alec Yoder; United States

== Final results ==
Position	Gymnast	Floor (gymnastics)	Pommel horse	Rings (gymnastics)	Vault (gymnastics)	Parallel bars	Horizontal bar	Total
1st place, gold medalist(s)	Giarnni Regini-Moran (GBR)	14.900	13.325	13.550	14.850	14.000	13.700	84.725
2nd place, silver medalist(s)	Nikita Nagornyy (RUS)	13.550	13.800	13.950	14.800	13.300	13.600	83.050
3rd place, bronze medalist(s)	Alec Yoder (USA)	13.650	14.100	13.100	14.250	13.850	13.850	82.800
4	Botond Kardos (HUN)	14.300	13.900	12.850	14.500	14.100	13.000	82.650
5	Ma Yue (CHN)	14.300	13.650	14.000	14.450	13.350	12.300	82.050
6	Vladyslav Hyrko (UKR)	14.000	14.050	13.350	13.950	13.625	12.950	81.925
7	Kenya Yuasa (JPN)	14.100	12.850	13.050	13.100	13.850	13.850	80.800
8	Zachari Hrimeche (FRA)	13.900	12.550	13.000	14.200	13.400	13.700	80.750
9	Luka Van Den Keybus (BEL)	13.350	12.400	12.700	13.650	13.600	13.450	79.150
10	Artem Dolgopyat (ISR)	13.850	13.250	12.200	13.550	11.700	12.850	78.400
11	Igor Takac (SVK)	13.150	12.800	13.050	12.800	13.550	12.900	78.250
12	Nils Dunkel (GER)	13.550	12.850	11.900	13.550	13.050	12.750	77.650
13	Marco Pfyl (SUI)	14.000	12.800	12.700	13.950	12.250	11.325	77.025
14	Mohamed Elhamy Aly (EGY)	13.500	11.450	12.450	14.200	12.700	12.500	76.800
15	Yerbol Jantykov (KAZ)	13.400	12.600	13.050	13.050	13.300	9.900	75.000
16	Andrés Martínez (COL)	13.850	11.100	10.300	14.100	12.050	13.375	74.750
17	Vladimir Tushev (BUL)	12.600	10.650	13.600	13.400	13.400	11.000	74.650
18	Phay Xing Loo (MAS)	12.950	12.300	11.625	13.000	12.650	12.000	74.525

== Reserves ==
The reserves for the All-Around Final were:

- René Cournoyer (CAN) (19th place)
- Emil Soravuo (FIN) (20th place)
- Jakov Vlahek (CRO) (21st place)
- Kjell Kim Vanstrom (SWE) (22nd place)
