= Gymnastics at the 2014 Summer Youth Olympics – Boys' parallel bars =

Boys' parallel bars at the II Summer Youth Olympic Games
- Venue: Nanjing Olympic Sports Center Gymnasium
- Date: 24 August
- Competitors: 8 from 8 nations
- Winning score: 14.033

Medalists
1st place, gold medalist(s)		Nikita Nagornyy	Russia
2nd place, silver medalist(s)		Botond Kardos	Hungary
3rd place, bronze medalist(s)		Giarnni Regini-Moran	Great Britain

The Boy's parallel bars event final for the 2014 Summer Youth Olympics took place on the 24th of August at Nanjing Olympic Sports Center Gymnasium.

== Medalists ==
Gold	Silver	Bronze
Nikita Nagornyy; Russia	Botond Kardos; Hungary	Giarnni Regini-Moran; Great Britain

== Qualification ==
The top eight gymnasts from qualification advanced into the final.

== Results ==
Rank	Gymnast	D-score	E-score	Penalty	Total
Gold medal	Nikita Nagornyy (RUS)	5.6	8.433		14.033
Silver medal	Botond Kardos (HUN)	4.9	9.116		14.016
Bronze medal	Giarnni Regini-Moran (GBR)	5.4	8.600		14.000
4	Alec Yoder (USA)	5.1	8.533		13.633
5	Marco Pfyl (SUI)	4.7	8.841		13.541
6	Kenya Yuasa (JPN)	5.4	8.133		13.533
7	Loo Phay Xing (MAS)	4.9	8.466		13.366
8	Nils Dunkel (GER)	4.9	8.400		13.300

Reserves

The following gymnasts were reserves for the final:

- Zachari Hrimeche (FRA)
- Vladyslav Hryko (UKR)
- Ma Yue (CHN)
