= Gymnastics at the 2014 Summer Youth Olympics – Boys' vault =

Boys' vault at the II Summer Youth Olympic Games
- Venue: Nanjing Olympic Sports Center Gymnasium
- Date: 24 August
- Competitors: 8 from 8 nations
- Winning score: 14.695

Medalists
1st place, gold medalist(s)		Giarnni Regini-Moran	Great Britain
2nd place, silver medalist(s)		Ma Yue	China
3rd place, bronze medalist(s)		Nikita Nagornyy	Russia

The Boy's vault event final for the 2014 Summer Youth Olympics took place on the 24th of August at Nanjing Olympic Sports Center Gymnasium.

== Medalists ==
Gold	Silver	Bronze
Giarnni Regini-Moran; Great Britain	Ma Yue; China	Nikita Nagornyy; Russia

== Qualification ==
The top eight gymnasts from qualification advanced into the final.

== Results ==
Rank	Gymnast	#	A-score	B-score	Penalty	Average	Total
Gold medal	Giarnni Regini-Moran (GBR)	1	5.6	9.200	—	14.800	14.695
Gold medal	Giarnni Regini-Moran (GBR)	2	5.2	9.391	—	14.591	14.695
Silver medal	Ma Yue (CHN)	1	5.2	9.200	—	14.400	14.416
Silver medal	Ma Yue (CHN)	2	5.2	9.233	—	14.433	14.416
Bronze medal	Nikita Nagornyy (RUS)	1	5.6	8.500	0.3	13.800	14.383
Bronze medal	Nikita Nagornyy (RUS)	2	5.6	9.366	—	14.966	14.383
4	Clay Mason Stephens (AUS)	1	5.2	9.300	—	14.500	14.166
4	Clay Mason Stephens (AUS)	2	4.8	9.133	0.1	13.833	14.166
5	Artem Dolgopyat (ISR)	1	5.2	8.883	—	14.083	13.974
5	Artem Dolgopyat (ISR)	2	4.8	9.066	—	13.866	13.974
6	René Cournoyer (CAN)	1	5.6	7.966	—	13.566	13.883
6	René Cournoyer (CAN)	2	5.2	9.100	0.1	14.200	13.883
7	Emil Soravuo (FIN)	1	5.2	8.741	0.1	13.841	13.837
7	Emil Soravuo (FIN)	2	4.4	9.433	—	13.833	13.837
8	Mohamed Elhamy Aly (EGY)	1	5.2	8.566	—	13.766	13.599
8	Mohamed Elhamy Aly (EGY)	2	5.6	7.833	—	13.433	13.599

== Reserves ==
The following gymnasts were reserves for the boys vault final.

- Patricio Razo Padillo (MEX)
- Nattipong Aeadwong (THA)
- Marco Pfyl (SUI)
