= Gymnastics at the 2014 Summer Youth Olympics =

Gymnastics at the II Summer Youth Olympic Games
- Venue: Nanjing Olympic Sports Centre
- Dates: 17–27 August
- No. of events: 16 (8 boys, 8 girls)

Gymnastics at the 2014 Summer Youth Olympics was held from 17 to 27 August at the Nanjing Olympic Sports Centre in Nanjing, China.

== Qualification ==
=== Artistic gymnastics ===
Each National Olympic Committee (NOC) can enter a maximum of 2 athletes, 1 per each gender. Athletes can qualify their nations in one of five continental qualification tournaments. The host quota was not given to China because they qualified 2 athletes at the 2014 Asian Championships. Initially 6 spots, 3 in each gender was allocated to the Tripartite Commission, however only two spots were given; this will cause a reduction from the continental quota depending which continent the chosen athlete is from. Due to the lack of eligible athletes at the African Championships one male athlete quota was transferred to Europe.

To be eligible to participate at the Youth Olympics male athletes must have been born between 1 January 1997 and 31 December 1998 while female athletes must have been born between 1 January 1999 and 31 December 1999. Also athletes who have participated in FIG senior competitions or multisport games may not participate in the Youth Olympic Games

Event	Location	Date	Total places	Qualified boys	Qualified girls
2014 African Championships	(South Africa) Tshwane	27–30 March 2014	3/4	Mohamed Elhamy Aly (EGY); Hamza Hajjaji (MAR); Muhammad Mia (RSA)	Fatima Mokhtari (ALG); Nada Ayman Ibrahim (EGY); Mammule Rankoe (RSA); Rahma Mastouri (TUN)
2014 Junior Pan American Championships	(Brazil) Aracaju	27–30 March 2014	8/9	Lucas Cardoso (BRA); René Cournoyer (CAN); Andrés Martínez (COL); Patricio Razo (MEX); Luis Pizarro (PER); Andres Gines (PUR); Alec Yoder (USA)	Augustina Santamaria (ARG); Flávia Saraiva (BRA); Sydney Townsend (CAN); Morgan Lloyd (CAY); Laura Pardo (COL); Katherine Godinez (GUA); Stephanie Hernández (MEX); Ana Karina Mendez (PER); Paola Irizarry (PUR)
Tripartite Invitation	–	–	8/9	Kevin Espinosa (PAN)	
2014 Asian Championships	(Uzbekistan) Tashkent	10–14 April 2014	10/9	Ma Yue (CHN); Abhijeet Kumar (IND); Kenya Yuasa (JPN); Yerbol Jantikov (KAZ); Myongwoo Lim (KOR); Jeremiah Loo (MAS); Nattipong Aeadwong (THA); Timur Kadirov (UZB); Định Vương Trần (VIE)	Wang Yan (CHN); Fatimah Al-Tameemi (IRQ); Sae Miyagawa (JPN); Arailym Khanseiitova (KAZ); Hana Park (KOR); Ava Verdeflor (PHI); Rahma Al-Dualimi (QAT); Nadine Joy Nathan (SIN); Veronika Orlova (UZB)
Tripartite Invitation	–	–	10/9	Yazan Abendeh (JOR)	
2014 European MAG Championships; 2014 European WAG Championships	(Bulgaria) Sofia	12–25 May 2014	19/18	Vigen Khachatryan (ARM); Johannes Mairoser (AUT); Ilya Yakauleu (BLR); Luka van den Keybus (BEL); Vladimir Tushev (BUL); Jakov Vlahek (CRO); Marios Georgiou (CYP); Emil Soravuo (FIN); Zachari Hrimeche (FRA); Nils Dunkel (GER); Giarnni Regini-Moran (GBR); Antonios Tantalidis (GRE); Botond Kardos (HUN); Artem Dolgopyat (ISR); Nikita Nagornyy (RUS); Igor Takáč (SVK); Kjell Kim Vanström (SWE); Marco Pfyl (SUI); Vladyslav Hryko (UKR)	Ceyda Sirbu (AUT); Natallia Yakubava (BLR); Veronika Cenkova (CZE); Monica Sileoni (FIN); Camille Bahl (FRA); Antonia Alicke (GER); Ellie Downie (GBR); Evangelia Monokrousou (GRE); Boglárka Dévai (HUN); Iosra Abdelaziz (ITA); Wendy de Jong (NED); Martine Skregelid (NOR); Wiktoria Lopuszanska (POL); Sara Raposeiro (POR); Laura Jurcă (ROU); Seda Tutkhalyan (RUS); Gaia Nesurini (SUI); Tutya Yılmaz (TUR)
2014 Oceania Championships	(Australia) Melbourne	21–25 May 2014	1	Clay Stephens (AUS)	Millie Williamson (NZL)
TOTAL				42	42

=== Rhythmic gymnastics ===
Each National Olympic Committee (NOC) can enter a maximum of 1 individual athlete and 1 group of 5 athletes. Each continent will qualify one group through five continental qualification tournaments along with China as hosts. China however, declined its spot and it was reallocated to the next best ranked Asian team. Oceania also declined to use its continental quota and the spot was reallocated to the next best team from Europe. Individual athletes can qualify their nations in one of five continental qualification tournaments. Despite being hosts China did not select an athlete to compete in this event. Initially 2 spots were allocated to the Tripartite Commission, however none were given.

To be eligible to participate at the Youth Olympics athletes must have been born between 1 January 1999 and 31 December 1999. Also athletes who have participated in FIG senior competitions or multisport games may not participate in the Youth Olympic Games

==== Individual ====
Event	Location	Date	Total places	Qualified
2014 Asian Championships	(Malaysia) Kuala Lumpur	21–24 February 2014	4	Takana Tatsusawa (JPN); Yelizaveta Mainovskaya (KAZ); Olivia Tai (MAS); Anora Davlyatova (UZB)
2014 Grand Prix (Europe Qualifying)	(Russia) Moscow	28 Feb–2 Mar 2014	7	Mariya Trubach (BLR); Katerina Marinova (BUL); Linoy Ashram (ISR); Nicoleta Dulgheru (MDA); Ana Luiza Filiorianu (ROU); Yulia Bravikova (RUS); Valeriya Khanina (UKR)
2014 African Championships	(South Africa) Tshwane	25 Mar–4 Apr 2014	3	Hana Hassan Nafie (EGY); Basma Ouatay (MAR); Shannon Gardiner (RSA)
2014 Pan American Championships	(United States) Daytona Beach	9–11 May 2014	3	Mayra Siñeriz (BRA); Edna Garcia (MEX); Laura Zeng (USA)
Oceania Qualifying Event	(New Zealand) Auckland	9–11 May 2014	1	Tara Wilkie (AUS)
TOTAL			18	

==== Group ====
Event	Location	Date	Qualified
Host nation	-	-	~~China~~
2014 Asian Championships	(Malaysia) Kuala Lumpur	21–24 February 2014	Uzbekistan; Kazakhstan
2014 Grand Prix (Europe Qualifying)	(Russia) Moscow	28 Feb–2 Mar 2014	Russia; Bulgaria
2014 African Championships	(South Africa) Tshwane	25 Mar–4 Apr 2014	Egypt
2014 Pan American Championships	(United States) Daytona Beach	9–11 May 2014	Canada
Oceania Qualifying Event	(New Zealand) Auckland	11 May 2014	Declined
TOTAL			6

=== Trampoline ===
Each National Olympic Committee (NOC) can enter a maximum of 2 athletes, 1 per each gender. Athletes can qualify their nations in one of five continental qualification tournaments. As they qualified normally China was not given the host quota. Initially a further 2, 1 in each gender was to be decided by the Tripartite Commission, but only 1 spot was given; this will cause a reduction from the continental quota depending which continent the chosen athlete is from.

To be eligible to participate at the Youth Olympics athletes must have been born between 1 January 1997 and 31 December 1998. Also athletes who have participated in FIG senior competitions or multisport games may not participate in the Youth Olympic Games

Event	Location	Date	Total places	Qualified boys	Qualified girls
2014 European Championships	(Portugal) Guimaraes	7–13 April 2014	4	Artsion Zhuk (BLR); Zachary Sheridan (GBR); Pedro Ferreira (POR); Oleg Selyutin (RUS)	Léa Labrousse (FRA); Teona Janjgava (GEO); Zainub Akbar (GBR); Maria Zacharchuk (RUS)
2014 African Championships	(Namibia) Walvis Bay	30 Apr–1 May 2014	2	Mohab Ayman Hassan (EGY); Reinhardt van Zyl (NAM)	Ashrakat Ismail (EGY)
Tripartite Invitation	-	-	2		Jivanka Kruger (NAM)
2014 Pan American Championships	(United States) Daytona Beach	7–12 May 2014	2	Luis Loria (MEX); Cody Gesuelli (USA)	Karina Cantú (MEX); Nicole Ahsinger (USA)
2014 Oceania Championships	(Australia) Melbourne	28–30 May 2014	1	Dylan Schmidt (NZL)	Abbie Watts (AUS)
2014 Asian Championships	(Japan) Chiba	2–4 June 2014	3	Liu Changxin (CHN); Pirmammad Aliyev (KAZ); Amiran Babayan (UZB)	Zhu Xueying (CHN); Rana Nakano (JPN); Nadeen Wehdan (QAT)
TOTAL				12	12

== Schedule ==
The schedule was released by the Nanjing Youth Olympic Games Organizing Committee.

All times are CST (UTC+8)

Event date	Event day	Starting time	Event details
August 17	Sunday	13:30	Boys' artistic gymnastics qualification
August 17	Sunday	19:00	Boys' artistic gymnastics qualification
August 18	Monday	11:00	Girls' artistic gymnastics qualification
August 18	Monday	14:30	Girls' artistic gymnastics qualification
August 18	Monday	19:00	Girls' artistic gymnastics qualification
August 19	Tuesday	19:00	Boys' artistic individual all-around finals
August 20	Wednesday	19:00	Girls' artistic individual all-around finals
August 21	Thursday	13:30	Girls' trampoline
August 22	Friday	13:30	Boys' trampoline
August 23	Saturday	19:00	Boys' floor finals Girls' vault finals Boys' pommel horse finals Girls' uneven bars finals Boys' rings finals
August 24	Sunday	19:00	Boys' vault finals Girls' balance beam finals Boys' parallel bars finals Girls' floor finals Boys' horizontal bar finals
August 26	Tuesday	11:00	Girls' rhythmic individual all-around qualification
August 26	Tuesday	14:30	Girls' rhythmic individual all-around qualification
August 26	Tuesday	19:00	Girls' rhythmic group all-around qualification
August 27	Wednesday	13:30	Girls' rhythmic individual all-around finals
August 27	Wednesday	19:00	Girls' rhythmic group all-around finals

== Medal summary ==
=== Medal table ===
Rank	Nation	Gold	Silver	Bronze	Total
1	Russia	7	2	2	11
2	China	3	3	1	7
3	Great Britain	3	1	5	9
4	Japan	1	2	1	4
5	Brazil	1	2	0	3
6	New Zealand	1	0	0	1
7	Ukraine	0	1	1	2
8	Belarus	0	1	0	1
8	Belgium	0	1	0	1
8	Bulgaria	0	1	0	1
8	Hungary	0	1	0	1
8	Italy	0	1	0	1
13	United States	0	0	2	2
14	Kazakhstan	0	0	1	1
14	Portugal	0	0	1	1
14	South Korea	0	0	1	1
14	Uzbekistan	0	0	1	1
Totals (17 entries)		16	16	16	48

=== Artistic gymnastics ===
==== Boys' events ====
Games	Gold	Silver	Bronze
All-around	Giarnni Regini-Moran; Great Britain	Nikita Nagornyy; Russia	Alec Yoder; United States
Floor exercise	Giarnni Regini-Moran; Great Britain	Kenya Yuasa; Japan	Lim Myong-woo; South Korea
Pommel horse	Nikita Nagornyy; Russia	Vladyslav Hryko; Ukraine	Timur Kadirov; Uzbekistan
Rings	Nikita Nagornyy; Russia	Ma Yue; China	Vladyslav Hryko; Ukraine
Vault	Giarnni Regini-Moran; Great Britain	Ma Yue; China	Nikita Nagornyy; Russia
Parallel bars	Nikita Nagornyy; Russia	Botond Kardos; Hungary	Giarnni Regini-Moran; Great Britain
Horizontal bar	Kenya Yuasa; Japan	Luka van den Keybus; Belgium	Giarnni Regini-Moran; Great Britain

==== Girls' events ====
Games	Gold	Silver	Bronze
All-around	Seda Tutkhalyan; Russia	Flávia Saraiva; Brazil	Ellie Downie; Great Britain
Vault	Wang Yan; China	Ellie Downie; Great Britain	Sae Miyakawa; Japan
Uneven bars	Seda Tutkhalyan; Russia	Iosra Abdelaziz; Italy	Wang Yan; China
Balance beam	Wang Yan; China	Flávia Saraiva; Brazil	Ellie Downie; Great Britain
Floor exercise	Flávia Saraiva; Brazil	Seda Tutkhalyan; Russia	Ellie Downie; Great Britain

=== Rhythmic gymnastics ===
Games	Gold	Silver	Bronze
Individual all-around	Irina Annenkova; Russia	Mariya Trubach; Belarus	Laura Zeng; United States
Group all-around	Russia; Daria Anenkova; Daria Dubova; Victoria Ilina; Natalia Safonova; Sofya Skomorokh	Bulgaria; Elena Bineva; Aleksandra Mitrovich; Emiliya Radicheva; Sofiya Rangelova; Gabriela Stefanova	Kazakhstan; Viktoriya Guslyakova; Amina Kozhakhat; Nuray Kumarova; Darya Medvedeva; Aliya Moldakhmetova

=== Trampoline gymnastics ===
Games	Gold	Silver	Bronze
Boys' individual	Dylan Schmidt; New Zealand	Liu Changxin; China	Pedro Ferreira; Portugal
Girls' individual	Zhu Xueying; China	Rana Nakano; Japan	Maria Zakharchuk; Russia

== Start list ==
=== Men's qualification ===
Floor (gymnastics)	Pommel horse	Rings (gymnastics)
Subdivision 1
Canada	Sweden	Kazakhstan
Slovakia	Colombia	Armenia
Peru	Panama	Germany
Morocco	China	South Africa
Greece	Brazil	Belgium
Israel	Australia	Mexico
France	Malaysia	Russia
Subdivision 2
Japan	Belarus	Egypt
Switzerland	Cyprus	Finland
Austria	Thailand	Hungary
Puerto Rico	South Korea	United Kingdom
Jordan	India	Uzbekistan
Ukraine	Vietnam	Bulgaria
Croatia	Italy	United States

=== Women's qualification ===
Vault (gymnastics)	Uneven bars
Subdivision 1
Puerto Rico	Kazakhstan
Algeria	South Korea
Cayman Islands	Hungary
Iraq	Singapore
Finland	United Kingdom
Portugal	Peru
South Africa	Japan
Subdivision 2
Turkey	Italy
Mexico	China
Czech Republic	Uzbekistan
Poland	Argentina
Belarus	Canada
Egypt	Austria
Switzerland	Philippines
Subdivision 3
Qatar	Netherlands
Greece	Romania
Belgium	Russia
Guatemala	Germany
Tunisia	Norway
Colombia	New Zealand
France	Brazil
