= Gymnastics at the 2014 Summer Youth Olympics – Girls' floor =

Girls' Floor at the II Summer Youth Olympic Games
- Venue: Nanjing Olympic Sports Center Gymnasium
- Date: 24 August
- Competitors: 8 from 8 nations
- Winning score: 13.766

Medalists
1st place, gold medalist(s)		Flávia Saraiva	Brazil
2nd place, silver medalist(s)		Seda Tutkhalyan	Russia
3rd place, bronze medalist(s)		Ellie Downie	Great Britain

The Girl's floor event final for the 2014 Summer Youth Olympics took place on the 24th of August at the Nanjing Olympic Sports Center Gymnasium.

== Medalists ==
Gold	Silver	Bronze
Flávia Saraiva; Brazil	Seda Tutkhalyan; Russia	Ellie Downie; Great Britain

== Qualification ==
The top eight gymnasts from qualification advanced into the final.

== Final ==
Rank	Gymnast	Difficulty	Execution	Penalty	Total
Gold medal	Flávia Saraiva (BRA)	5.3	8.466	—	13.766
Silver medal	Seda Tutkhalyan (RUS)	5.3	8.433	—	13.733
Bronze medal	Ellie Downie (GBR)	5.5	8.066	0.1	13.466
4	Laura Jurca (ROU)	5.4	7.966	—	13.366
5	Antonia Alicke (GER)	4.9	8.166	—	13.066
6	Iosra Abdelaziz (ITA)	5.0	7.933	—	12.933
7	Sydney Townsend (CAN)	5.3	7.533	—	12.833
8	Tutya Yılmaz (TUR)	5.1	5.000	0.9	9.200

== Reserves ==
The following gymnasts were reserves for the floor final.

- Stephanie Hernandez (MEX)
- Camille Bahl (FRA)
- Nadine Joy Nathan (SIN)
