= Gymnastics at the 2014 Summer Youth Olympics – Girls' balance beam =

Girls' Balance Beam at the II Summer Youth Olympic Games
- Venue: Nanjing Olympic Sports Center Gymnasium
- Date: 24 August
- Competitors: 8 from 8 nations
- Winning score: 14.633

Medalists
1st place, gold medalist(s)		Wang Yan	China
2nd place, silver medalist(s)		Flávia Saraiva	Brazil
3rd place, bronze medalist(s)		Ellie Downie	Great Britain

The girl's balance beam event final for the 2014 Summer Youth Olympics took place on the 24th of August at the Nanjing Olympic Sports Center Gymnasium.

== Medalists ==
Gold	Silver	Bronze
Wang Yan; China	Flávia Saraiva; Brazil	Ellie Downie; Great Britain

== Qualification ==
The top eight gymnasts from qualification advanced into the final.

== Final results ==
Rank	Gymnast	Difficulty	Execution	Penalty	Total
Gold medal	Wang Yan (CHN)	6.4	8.233	—	14.633
Silver medal	Flávia Saraiva (BRA)	5.5	8.500	—	14.000
Bronze medal	Ellie Downie (GBR)	5.6	7.900	—	13.500
4	Iosra Abdelaziz (ITA)	4.7	8.233	—	12.933
5	Natallia Yakubava (BLR)	5.3	7.466	—	12.766
6	Veronika Cenkova (CZE)	5.2	7.433	—	12.633
7	Stephanie Hernandez (MEX)	4.5	7.858	—	12.358
8	Laura Jurca (ROU)	5.4	6.466	—	11.866

== Reserves ==
The following gymnasts were reserves for the balance beam final.

- Seda Tutkhalyan (RUS)
- Martine Skregelid (NOR)
- Antonia Alicke (GER)
