= Gymnastics at the 2014 Summer Youth Olympics – Girls' vault =

Girls' Vault at the II Summer Youth Olympic Games
- Venue: Nanjing Olympic Sports Center Gymnasium
- Date: 23 August
- Competitors: 8 from 8 nations
- Winning score: 14.783

Medalists
1st place, gold medalist(s)		Wang Yan	China
2nd place, silver medalist(s)		Ellie Downie	Great Britain
3rd place, bronze medalist(s)		Sae Miyakawa	Japan

The Girl's vault event final for the 2014 Summer Youth Olympics took place on the 23rd of August at the Nanjing Olympic Sports Center Gymnasium.

== Medalists ==
Gold	Silver	Bronze
Wang Yan; China	Ellie Downie; Great Britain	Sae Miyakawa; Japan

== Qualification ==
The top eight gymnasts from qualification advanced into the final.

== Results ==
Rank	Gymnast	#	A-score	B-score	Penalty	Average	Total
Gold medal	Wang Yan (CHN)	1	6.0	8.900	—	14.900	14.783
Gold medal	Wang Yan (CHN)	2	6.2	8.566	0.1	14.666	14.783
Silver medal	Ellie Downie (GBR)	1	5.8	9.066	—	14.866	14.566
Silver medal	Ellie Downie (GBR)	2	5.2	9.066	—	14.266	14.566
Bronze medal	Sae Miyakawa (JPN)	1	5.8	9.000	—	14.800	14.566
Bronze medal	Sae Miyakawa (JPN)	2	5.4	8.933	—	14.333	14.566
4	Laura Jurca (ROU)	1	5.0	8.833	—	13.833	14.249
4	Laura Jurca (ROU)	2	5.8	8.866	—	14.666	14.249
5	Seda Tutkhalyan (RUS)	1	5.8	8.800	—	14.600	13.816
5	Seda Tutkhalyan (RUS)	2	5.2	7.833	—	13.033	13.816
6	Boglárka Dévai (HUN)	1	5.0	8.733	—	13.733	13.766
6	Boglárka Dévai (HUN)	2	5.2	8.600	—	13.800	13.766
7	Sydney Townsend (CAN)	1	5.0	8.600	–	13.600	13.750
7	Sydney Townsend (CAN)	2	5.8	8.400	0.3	13.900	13.750
8	Tutya Yilmaz (TUR)	1	5.0	8.800	—	13.800	13.533
8	Tutya Yilmaz (TUR)	2	5.8	7.566	0.1	13.266	13.533

=== Tiebreaker ===
Ellie Downie and Sae Miyakawa had tied for second place with 14.566. For the tiebreaker, the highest scoring vault for each gymnast was used to determine who won the silver and who won the bronze. Downie's highest vault score was 14.866, and Miyakawa's was 14.800.

== Reserves ==
The following gymnasts were reserves for the vault final.

- Camille Bahl (FRA)
- Nada Ayman Ibrahim (EGY)
- Laura Pardo (COL)
