= Great Britain at the 2014 Summer Youth Olympics =

- IOC code: GBR
- NOC: British Olympic Association
- Website: www.teamgb.com

in Nanjing
- Competitors: 33 in 13 sports
- Medals Ranked 11th: Gold 5 Silver 5 Bronze 10 Total 20

Summer Youth Olympics appearances (overview)
- 2010; 2014; 2018; 2026

Great Britain competed at the 2014 Summer Youth Olympics, in Nanjing, China from 16 August to 28 August 2014. On 9 July 2014, the British Olympic Association named a team of 33 athletes to compete at the Games.

== Medalists ==
Medals awarded to participants of mixed-NOC (combined) teams are represented in italics. These medals are not counted towards the individual NOC medal tally.

| Medal | Name | Sport | Event | Date |
|---|---|---|---|---|
| Gold | Ben Dijkstra | Triathlon | Boys' race | 18 August |
| Gold | Giarnni Regini-Moran | Gymnastics | Boys' artistic individual all-around | 19 August |
| Gold | Luke Greenbank; Miles Munro; Duncan Scott; Martyn Walton | Swimming | Boys' 4 × 100 m freestyle relay | 19 August |
| Gold | Jake Saywell | Equestrian | Team jumping | 20 August |
| Gold | Ben Dijkstra | Triathlon | Mixed relay | 21 August |
| Gold | Giarnni Regini-Moran | Gymnastics | Boys' floor | 23 August |
| Gold | Giarnni Regini-Moran | Gymnastics | Boys' vault | 24 August |
| Silver | Jessica Fullalove | Swimming | Girls' 100 m backstroke | 18 August |
| Silver | Charlotte Atkinson; Georgina Evans; Jessica Fullalove; Amelia Maughan | Swimming | Girls' 4 × 100 m medley relay | 18 August |
| Silver | Jessica Fullalove | Swimming | Girls' 50 m backstroke | 21 August |
| Silver | Sian Rainsley | Triathlon | Mixed relay | 21 August |
| Silver | Ellie Downie | Gymnastics | Girls' vault | 23 August |
| Silver | Francesca Summers | Modern Pentathlon | Girls' individual | 23 August |
| Bronze | Abigail Stones | Taekwondo | Girls' −44 kg | 17 August |
| Bronze | Christian McNeish | Taekwondo | Boys' −63 kg | 19 August |
| Bronze | Ellie Downie | Gymnastics | Girls' artistic individual all-around | 20 August |
| Bronze | Peter Miles | Judo | Mixed team | 21 August |
| Bronze | Luke Greenbank | Swimming | Boys' 200 m backstroke | 22 August |
| Bronze | Giarnni Regini-Moran | Gymnastics | Boys' horizontal bar | 24 August |
| Bronze | Giarnni Regini-Moran | Gymnastics | Boys' parallel bars | 24 August |
| Bronze | Ellie Downie | Gymnastics | Girls' balance beam | 24 August |
| Bronze | Ellie Downie | Gymnastics | Girls' floor | 24 August |
| Bronze | Muhammad Ali | Boxing | Boys' -52 kg | 27 August |
| Bronze | Peter McGrail | Boxing | Boys' -56 kg | 27 August |

== Archery ==
Great Britain qualified two archers from its performance at the 2013 World Archery Youth Championships.

individual

| Athlete | Event | Ranking round | | Round of 32 | Round of 16 | Quarterfinals | Semifinals | Final / BM | Rank |
| Athlete | Event | Score | Seed | Opposition Score | Opposition Score | Opposition Score | Opposition Score | Opposition Score | Rank |
|---|---|---|---|---|---|---|---|---|---|
| Bradley Denny | Boys' individual | 670 | 11 | Murong (BAN); W 6-0 | Koenig (FRA); W 6-2 | D'Almeida (BRA); L 0-6 | Did not advance | | 8 |
| Bryony Pitman | Girls' individual | 634 | 14 | Romero (GUA); L 4-6 | Did not advance | | | | 17 |

Team

| Athletes | Event | Ranking round | | Round of 32 | Round of 16 | Quarterfinals | Semifinals | Final / BM | Rank |
| Athletes | Event | Score | Seed | Opposition Score | Opposition Score | Opposition Score | Opposition Score | Opposition Score | Rank |
|---|---|---|---|---|---|---|---|---|---|
| Bradley Denny (GBR); Miasa Koike (JPN) | Mixed team | 1288 | | Ghrari (LBA); Marin (ESP); W 5-4 | Machado (BRA); Szafran (POL); W 6-2 | Freywald (GER); Zolkepeli (MAS); L 4-5 | Did not advance | | 5 |
| Aliaksei Dubrova (BLR); Bryony Pitman (GBR) | Mixed team | 1285 | | Tongeren (NED); Zamirova (TJK); W 5-3 | Martens (BEL); Romero (GUA); L 1-5 | Did not advance | | | 9 |

== Boxing ==
Great Britain qualified three boxers based on its performance at the 2014 AIBA Youth World Championships

Boys

| Athlete | Event | Preliminaries | Semifinals | Final / RM | Rank |
| Athlete | Event | Opposition Result | Opposition Result | Opposition Result | Rank |
|---|---|---|---|---|---|
| Muhammad Ali | -52 kg | Yusifzada (AZE); W 2-1 | Stevenson (USA); L 0-3 | Bronze medal Bout Solanki (IND); W 3-0 | 3rd place, bronze medalist(s) |
| Peter McGrail | -56 kg | Takacs (SVK); W 2-1 | Ibanez Diaz (CUB); L 1-2 | Bronze medal Bout Tamma (ALG); W 3-0 | 3rd place, bronze medalist(s) |
| Viddal Riley | -81 kg | Bye | Naydenov (BUL); L 0-3 | Bronze medal Bout Manasyan (ARM); L 1-2 | 4 |

== Canoeing ==
Great Britain qualified two boats based on its performance at the 2013 world junior canoe sprint and slalom championships.

Boys

| Athlete | Event | Qualification | | Repechage | | Round of 16 | | Quarterfinals | Semifinals | Final / BM | Rank |
| Athlete | Event | Time | Rank | Time | Rank | Time | Rank | Opposition Result | Opposition Result | Opposition Result | Rank |
|---|---|---|---|---|---|---|---|---|---|---|---|
| Paul Sunderland | K1 slalom | 1:13.515 | 5 | Cancelled | | 1:09.713 | 4 | Taubner (FRA); W 1:12.333 | Urankar (SLO); L 1:12.688 | Huang (CHN); L 1:11.987 | 4 |
| Paul Sunderland | K1 sprint | 1:44.899 | 14 | 1:46.763 | 5 | 1:45.229 | 14 | Did not advance | | | |

Girls

| Athlete | Event | Qualification | | Repechage | | Round of 16 | | Quarterfinals | Semifinals | Final / BM | Rank |
| Athlete | Event | Time | Rank | Time | Rank | Time | Rank | Opposition Result | Opposition Result | Opposition Result | Rank |
|---|---|---|---|---|---|---|---|---|---|---|---|
| Victoria Murray | K1 slalom | 1:19.401 | 5 | —N/a | | 1:19.826 | 6 | Hilgertová (CZE); L 1:21.904 | Did not advance | | |
| Victoria Murray | K1 sprint | 2:17.101 | 14 | 2:17.279 | 6 | 2:20.668 | 14 | Did not advance | | | |

== Equestrian ==
Great Britain qualified a rider.

| Athlete | Horse | Event | Round 1 | | Round 2 | | | Total | |
| Athlete | Horse | Event | Penalties | Rank | Penalties | Total | Rank | Penalties | Rank |
|---|---|---|---|---|---|---|---|---|---|
| Jake Saywell | Galaxy | individual jumping | 4 | 11 | 8 | 12 | 10 | 12 | 10 |
| Europe; Jake Saywell (GBR); Michael Duffy (IRL); Matias Alvaro (ITA); Lisa Nooren (NED); Filip Agren (SWE) | Galaxy; Commander; Montelini; For The Sun; Abel | Team jumping | (8); 0; 0 (8); 0 (0); 0; 0 (0); 0 | 1 | (4); 0; 0 (0); 0 (0); 0; 0 (0); 0 | | 1 | 0 | 1st place, gold medalist(s) |

== Golf ==
Great Britain qualified one team of two athletes based on the 8 June 2014 IGF combined World Amateur Golf Rankings.

individual

| Athlete | Event | Round 1 | | Round 2 | | | Round 3 | | | Total | |
| Athlete | Event | Score | Rank | Score | Total | Rank | Score | Total | Rank | Score | Rank |
|---|---|---|---|---|---|---|---|---|---|---|---|
| Robert MacIntyre | Boys | 69 | 5 | 75 | 144 | 13 | 71 | 215 | 13 | 215 | 13 |
| Annabel Dimmock | Girls | DNS due to injury | | | | | | | | | |

== Gymnastics ==
=== Artistic gymnastics ===
Great Britain qualified one athlete based on its performance at the 2014 European MAG Championships and another athlete based on its performance at the 2014 European WAG Championships.

Boys

| Athlete | Event | Apparatus | | | | | | Total | Rank |
| Athlete | Event | F | PH | R | V | PB | HB | Total | Rank |
|---|---|---|---|---|---|---|---|---|---|
| Giarnni Regini-Moran | Qualification | 14.700 Q | 13.700 Q | 13.250 | 14.950 Q | 14.300 Q | 13.500 Q | 84.400 | 1 Q |
| Giarnni Regini-Moran | All-around | 14.900 | 13.325 | 13.550 | 14.850 | 14.400 | 13.700 | 84.725 | 1st place, gold medalist(s) |
| Giarnni Regini-Moran | Floor exercise | —N/a | | | | | | 14.766 | 1st place, gold medalist(s) |
| Giarnni Regini-Moran | Pommel horse | —N/a | | | | | | 13.400 | 6 |
| Giarnni Regini-Moran | Vault | —N/a | | | | | | 14.695 | 1st place, gold medalist(s) |
| Giarnni Regini-Moran | Parallel bars | —N/a | | | | | | 14.000 | 3rd place, bronze medalist(s) |
| Giarnni Regini-Moran | Horizontal bar | —N/a | | | | | | 13.633 | 3rd place, bronze medalist(s) |

Girls

| Athlete | Event | Apparatus | | | | Total | Rank |
| Athlete | Event | F | V | UB | BB | Total | Rank |
|---|---|---|---|---|---|---|---|
| Ellie Downie | Qualification | 13.500 Q | 14.900 Q | 11.600 | 13.500 Q | 53.500 | 2 Q |
| Ellie Downie | All-around | 12.900 | 14.750 | 13.350 | 13.150 | 54.150 | 3rd place, bronze medalist(s) |
| Ellie Downie | Floor exercise | —N/a | | | | 13.466 | 3rd place, bronze medalist(s) |
| Ellie Downie | Vault | —N/a | | | | 14.566 | 2nd place, silver medalist(s) |
| Ellie Downie | Balance beam | —N/a | | | | 13.500 | 3rd place, bronze medalist(s) |

=== Trampoline ===
Great Britain qualified one athlete based on its performance at the 2014 European Trampoline Championships.

| Athlete | Event | Qualification | | | | Final | |
| Athlete | Event | Routine 1 | Routine 2 | Total | Rank | Score | Rank |
|---|---|---|---|---|---|---|---|
| Zachary Sheridan | Boys | 43.190 | 52.470 | 95.660 | 5 | 11.000 | 6 |
| Zainub Akbar | Girls | 42.670 | 50.275 | 92.945 | 4 | 44.655 | 8 |

== Judo ==
Great Britain qualified two athletes based on its performance at the 2013 Cadet World Judo Championships.

individual

| Athlete | Event | Round of 32 | Round of 16 | Quarterfinals | Semifinals | Rep 1 | Rep 2 | Rep 3 | Rep 4 | Final / BM | Rank |
| Athlete | Event | Opposition Result | Opposition Result | Opposition Result | Opposition Result | Opposition Result | Opposition Result | Opposition Result | Opposition Result | Opposition Result | Rank |
|---|---|---|---|---|---|---|---|---|---|---|---|
| Peter Miles | Boys' -66 kg | Sancho (CRC); L 0001-100 | Did not advance | | | Manzi (ITA); L 0002-000 | Did not advance | | | | |
| Lubjana Piovesana | Girls' -63 kg | —N/a | Dobre (ROU); L 0002-0001 | Did not advance | | Tintor (SRB); W 1011-0002 | Schwille (GER); L 0002-100 | Did not advance | | | |

Team

| Athletes | Event | Round of 16 | Quarterfinals | Semifinals | Final | Rank |
| Athletes | Event | Opposition Result | Opposition Result | Opposition Result | Opposition Result | Rank |
|---|---|---|---|---|---|---|
| Team Douillet; Gustavo Basile (ARG); Marko Bubanja (AUT); Adonis Diaz (USA); Liudmyla Drozdova (UKR); Lee Hye-kyeong (KOR); Brigita Matic (CRO); Peter Miles (GBR) | Mixed team | Team Yamashita (MIX); W 3^{200} – 3^{112} | Team Nevzorov (MIX); W 5 – 2 | Team Geesink (MIX); L 3^{111} – 3^{202} | Did not advance | 3rd place, bronze medalist(s) |
| Team Yamashita; Frank de Wit (NED); Nellie Einstein (SWE); Sandrine Mbazoghe Endamne (GAB); Lubjana Piovesana (GBR); Sara Rodriguez (ESP); Tsogtbaatar Tsend-Ochir (MGL); Jorre Verstraeten (BEL) | Mixed team | Team Douillet (MIX); L 3^{112} – 3^{200} | Did not advance | | | 9 |

== Modern pentathlon ==
Great Britain qualified one athlete based on its performance at the European YOG Qualifiers and another based on the 1 June 2014 Olympic Youth A Pentathlon World Rankings.

| Athlete | Event | Fencing Ranking round (épée one touch) | | Swimming (200 m freestyle) | | | Fencing Final round (épée one touch) | | Combined: shooting/running (10 m air pistol)/(3000 m) | | | Total Points | Final Rank |
| Athlete | Event | Results | Rank | Time | Rank | Points | Rank | Points | Time | Rank | Points | Total Points | Final Rank |
|---|---|---|---|---|---|---|---|---|---|---|---|---|---|
| Henry Choong | Boys' individual | 10-13 | 14 | 1:57.21 | 1 | 349 | 15 | 235 | 12:57.62 | 19 | 523 | 1207 | 11 |
| Francesca Summers | Girls' individual | 19-4 | 3 | 2:21.33 | 11 | 276 | 2 | 300 | 13:52.95 | 6 | 468 | 1044 | 2nd place, silver medalist(s) |
| Henry Choong (GBR); Laure Roset (FRA) | Mixed relay | 18-28 | 22 | 1:55.12 | 1 | 355 | 22 | 237 | 12:41.33 | 15 | 539 | 1131 | 17 |
| Francesca Summers (GBR); Bartosz Hoffman (POL) | Mixed relay | 26-20 | 4 | 2:04.19 | 15 | 328 | 4 | 291 | 12:42.05 | 16 | 538 | 1157 | 10 |

== Rowing ==
Great Britain qualified two boats based on its performance at the 2013 World Rowing Junior Championships.

| Athlete | Event | Heats | | Repechage | | Semifinals | | Final | |
| Athlete | Event | Time | Rank | Time | Rank | Time | Rank | Time | Rank |
|---|---|---|---|---|---|---|---|---|---|
| Chris Lawrie | Boys' single sculls | 3:28.01 | 2 R | 3:23.20 | 1 SA/B | 3:24.13 | 2 FA | 3:23.89 | 4 |
| Anna Thornton | Girls' single sculls | 3:52.18 | 4 R | 3:53.67 | 1 SA/B | 3:51.00 | 4 FB | 4:01.21 | 8 |

Qualification Legend: FA=Final A (medal); FB=Final B (non-medal); FC=Final C (non-medal); FD=Final D (non-medal); SA/B=Semifinals A/B; SC/D=Semifinals C/D; R=Repechage

== Sailing ==
Great Britain qualified one boat based on its performance at the Byte CII European Continental Qualifiers.

| Athlete | Event | race | | | | | | | | | | | Net Points | Final Rank |
| Athlete | Event | 1 | 2 | 3 | 4 | 5 | 6 | 7 | 8 | 9 | 10 | M* | Net Points | Final Rank |
|---|---|---|---|---|---|---|---|---|---|---|---|---|---|---|
| Hanna Brant | Girls' Byte CII | 22 | 14 | 15 | 20 | 1 | 7 | (31) | Cancelled | | | 24 | 103 | 18 |

== Swimming ==
Great Britain qualified eight swimmers.

Boys

| Athlete | Event | Heat | | Semifinal | | Final | |
| Athlete | Event | Time | Rank | Time | Rank | Time | Rank |
|---|---|---|---|---|---|---|---|
| Miles Munro | 50 m freestyle | 22.99 | 6 | 22.80 | 6 | 22.82 | 6 |
| Miles Munro | 100 m freestyle | 51.40 | 16 | 50.87 | 14 | Did not advance | |
| Duncan Scott | 50 m freestyle | 23.08 | 7 | 22.78 | 5 | 22.84 | 8 |
| Duncan Scott | 100 m freestyle | 50.60 | 7 | 50.33 | 6 | 49.96 | 6 |
| Duncan Scott | 200 m freestyle | 1:51.23 | 7 | —N/a | | 1:49.73 | 4 |
| Duncan Scott | 200 m individual medley | 2:04.98 | 9 | —N/a | | Did not advance | |
| Martyn Walton | 200 m freestyle | 1:51.73 | 11 | —N/a | | Did not advance | |
| Martyn Walton | 400 m freestyle | 4:02.40 | 24 | —N/a | | Did not advance | |
| Martyn Walton | 200 m individual medley | 2:08.75 | 17 | —N/a | | Did not advance | |
| Luke Greenbank | 100 m backstroke | 55.94 | 5 | 55.70 | 7 | 55.38 | 6 |
| Luke Greenbank | 200 m backstroke | 2:00.83 | 2 | —N/a | | 1:59.03 | 3rd place, bronze medalist(s) |
| Luke Greenbank | 100 m butterfly | 55.59 | 16 | 56.74 | 16 | Did not advance | |
| Luke Greenbank; Miles Munro; Duncan Scott; Martyn Walton | 4 × 100 m freestyle relay | 3:26.37 | 4 | —N/a | | 3:21.19 | 1st place, gold medalist(s) |
| Luke Greenbank; Miles Munro; Duncan Scott; Martyn Walton | 4 × 100 m medley relay | —N/a | | | | | |

Girls

| Athlete | Event | Heat | | Semifinal | | Final | |
| Athlete | Event | Time | Rank | Time | Rank | Time | Rank |
|---|---|---|---|---|---|---|---|
| Amelia Maughan | 50 m freestyle | 26.89 | 25 | Did not advance | | | |
| Amelia Maughan | 100 m freestyle | 57.08 | 14 | 55.97 | 10 | Did not advance | |
| Amelia Maughan | 200 m freestyle | 2:01.39 | 7 | —N/a | | 1:59.41 | 4 |
| Jessica Fullalove | 50 m backstroke | 29.13 | 4 | 28.94 | 4 | 28.66 | 2nd place, silver medalist(s) |
| Jessica Fullalove | 100 m backstroke | 1:02.58 | 9 | 1:01.35 | 1 | 1:01.23 | 2nd place, silver medalist(s) |
| Jessica Fullalove | 200 m backstroke | 2:20.62 | 23 | —N/a | | Did not advance | |
| Georgina Evans | 50 m breaststroke | 32.17 | 4 | 32.27 | 7 | 32.03 | 6 |
| Georgina Evans | 100 m breaststroke | 1:09.59 | 5 | 1:09.80 | 6 | 1:09.69 | 6 |
| Georgina Evans | 200 m breaststroke | 2:33.01 | 7 | —N/a | | 2:32.92 | 8 |
| Charlotte Atkinson | 50 m butterfly | 28.41 | 20 | Did not advance | | | |
| Charlotte Atkinson | 100 m butterfly | 1:00.72 | 6 | 1:00.27 | 6 | 1:00.61 | 8 |
| Charlotte Atkinson | 200 m butterfly | 2:18.56 | 19 | —N/a | | Did not advance | |
| Charlotte Atkinson; Georgina Evans; Jessica Fullalove; Amelia Maughan | 4 × 100 m freestyle relay | —N/a | | | | | |
| Charlotte Atkinson; Georgina Evans; Jessica Fullalove; Amelia Maughan | 4 × 100 m medley relay | 4:09.83 | 1 | —N/a | | 4:05.75 | 2nd place, silver medalist(s) |

Mixed

| Athlete | Event | Heat | | Final | |
| Athlete | Event | Time | Rank | Time | Rank |
|---|---|---|---|---|---|
| Charlotte Atkinson; Amelia Maughan; Duncan Scott; Martyn Walton | 4 × 100 m freestyle relay | 3:35.41 | 5 | 3:33.28 | 6 |
| Charlotte Atkinson; Georgina Evans; Luke Greenbank; Duncan Scott | 4 × 100 m medley relay | 3:58.80 | 5 | 3:58.32 | 6 |

== Taekwondo ==
Great Britain qualified two athletes based on its performance at the Taekwondo Qualification Tournament.

Boys

| Athlete | Event | Round of 16 | Quarterfinals | Semifinals | Final | Rank |
| Athlete | Event | Opposition Result | Opposition Result | Opposition Result | Opposition Result | Rank |
|---|---|---|---|---|---|---|
| Christian McNeish | −63 kg | Bye | Khartskhava (RUS); W 19-10 | Marques Quirino Pontes (BRA); L 6-12 | Did not advance | 3rd place, bronze medalist(s) |

Girls

| Athlete | Event | Round of 16 | Quarterfinals | Semifinals | Final | Rank |
| Athlete | Event | Opposition Result | Opposition Result | Opposition Result | Opposition Result | Rank |
|---|---|---|---|---|---|---|
| Abigail Stones | −44 kg | Bye | Aladaileh (JOR); W 5-2 | Ozbek (AZE); L 2-3 | Did not advance | 3rd place, bronze medalist(s) |

== Triathlon ==
Great Britain qualified two athletes based on its performance at the 2014 European Youth Olympic Games Qualifier.

individual

| Athlete | Event | Swim (750m) | Trans 1 | Bike (20 km) | Trans 2 | Run (5 km) | Total Time | Rank |
|---|---|---|---|---|---|---|---|---|
| Ben Dijkstra | Boys | 9:40 | 00:45 | 28:37 | 00:27 | 15:14 | 54:43 | 1st place, gold medalist(s) |
| Sian Rainsley | Girls | 10:08 | 00:46 | 31:43 | 00:26 | 18:50 | 1:01.53 | 8 |

relay

| Athlete | Event | Total Times per Athlete (Swim 250m, Bike 6.6 km, Run 1.8 km) | Total Group Time | Rank |
|---|---|---|---|---|
| Europe 1 Kristin Ranwig (GER); Emil Deleuran Hansen (DEN); Emilie Morier (FRA); Ben Dijkstra (GBR) | Mixed relay | 21:49; 19:25; 21:43; 19:20 | 1:22:17 | 1st place, gold medalist(s) |
| Europe 3 Sian Rainsley (GBR); Giulio Soldati (ITA); Carmen Gomez Cortes (ESP); Bence Lehmann (HUN) | Mixed relay | 21:23; 20:01; 21:23; 19:43 | 1:22:30 | 2nd place, silver medalist(s) |
