= Luka van den Keybus =

Belgian artistic gymnast

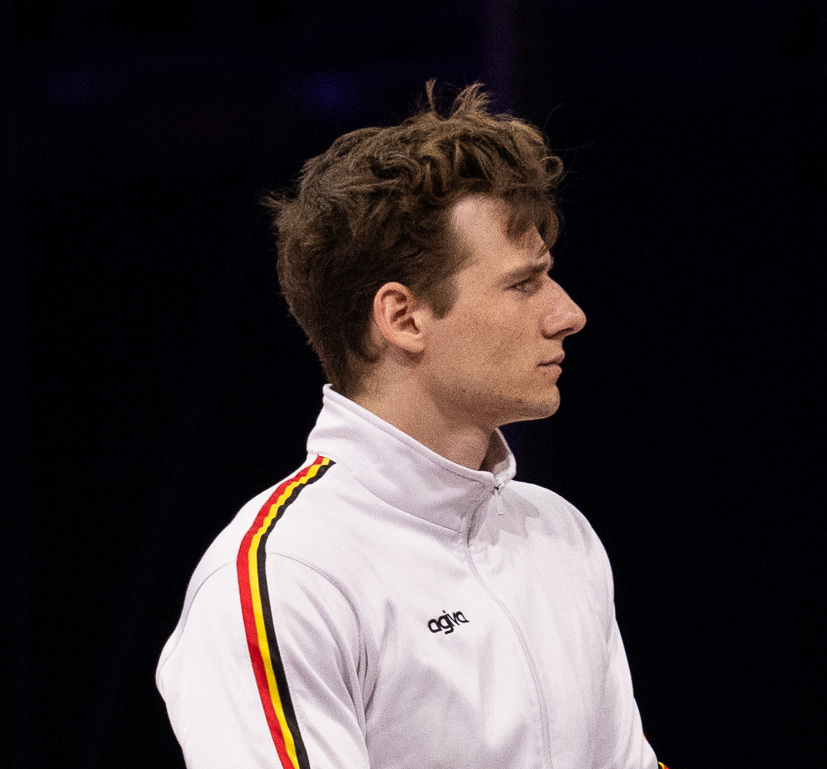
- Van den Keybus at the 2022 European Championships

Personal information
- Full name: Luka Van den Keybus
- Born: 14 April 1997 (age 29) Lokeren, Belgium
- Height: 1.68 m (5 ft 6 in)

Gymnastics career
- Discipline: Men's artistic gymnastics
- Country represented: Belgium
- Club: Gymteam Sint-Niklaas
- Head coach: Koen Van Damme
- Retired: 27 March 2026
Medal record
Men's artistic gymnastics
Representing Belgium
Youth Olympic Games
Silver medal – second place	2014 Nanjing	Horizontal bar

Luka van den Keybus (born 14 April 1997) is a retired Belgian artistic gymnast who captained the national team. He represented Belgium at the 2024 Summer Olympics.

== Early life and education ==
Van den Keybus was born in Lokeren, Belgium. He is studying business management at the Artevelde University of applied sciences in Ghent.

== Gymnastics career ==
Van den Keybus competed at the 2014 Youth Olympics Games in Nanjing, China. He finished 9th in the all-around final and won a silver medal on the horizontal bar.

He made his senior international debut at the 2015 European Games in Baku, Azerbaijan. He competed at his first senior European Championships in 2016 and his first World Championships in 2018.

At the 2021 European Championship in Basel, Switzerland, he placed 15th in the all-around final with a score of 79.065. Then, at the 2021 World Championships in Kitakyushu, Japan he placed 16th in the all-around final with a score of 81.265 which is the best result for a Belgian in world championship history.

He made a second all-around final at a World Championships in 2022 in Liverpool. He placed 20th with a score of 78.264.

At the 2023 European Championships in Mersin, Turkey, he finished 18th in the all-around final with a score of 79.099. Belgium also finished 8th in team qualification and qualified for a full-team for the World Championships.

He was selected for the 2023 World Championships in Antwerp, Belgium following his participation in several trial meets in Ghent, Belgium. He scored an 82.550 in the all-around at the first of these events. At the World Championships, the Belgian team failed to qualify a full-team for 2024 Summer Olympics after they finished in 15th with a score of 245.095. However, Van den Keybus was able to qualify individually through his all-around result, where he placed 29th with a score of 80.798. He was initially the third reserve for the all-around final, but after several withdrawals he entered the final and finished in 21st place.

On March 27, 2026, he announced his sporting retirement.
