= Nils Dunkel =

German artistic gymnast

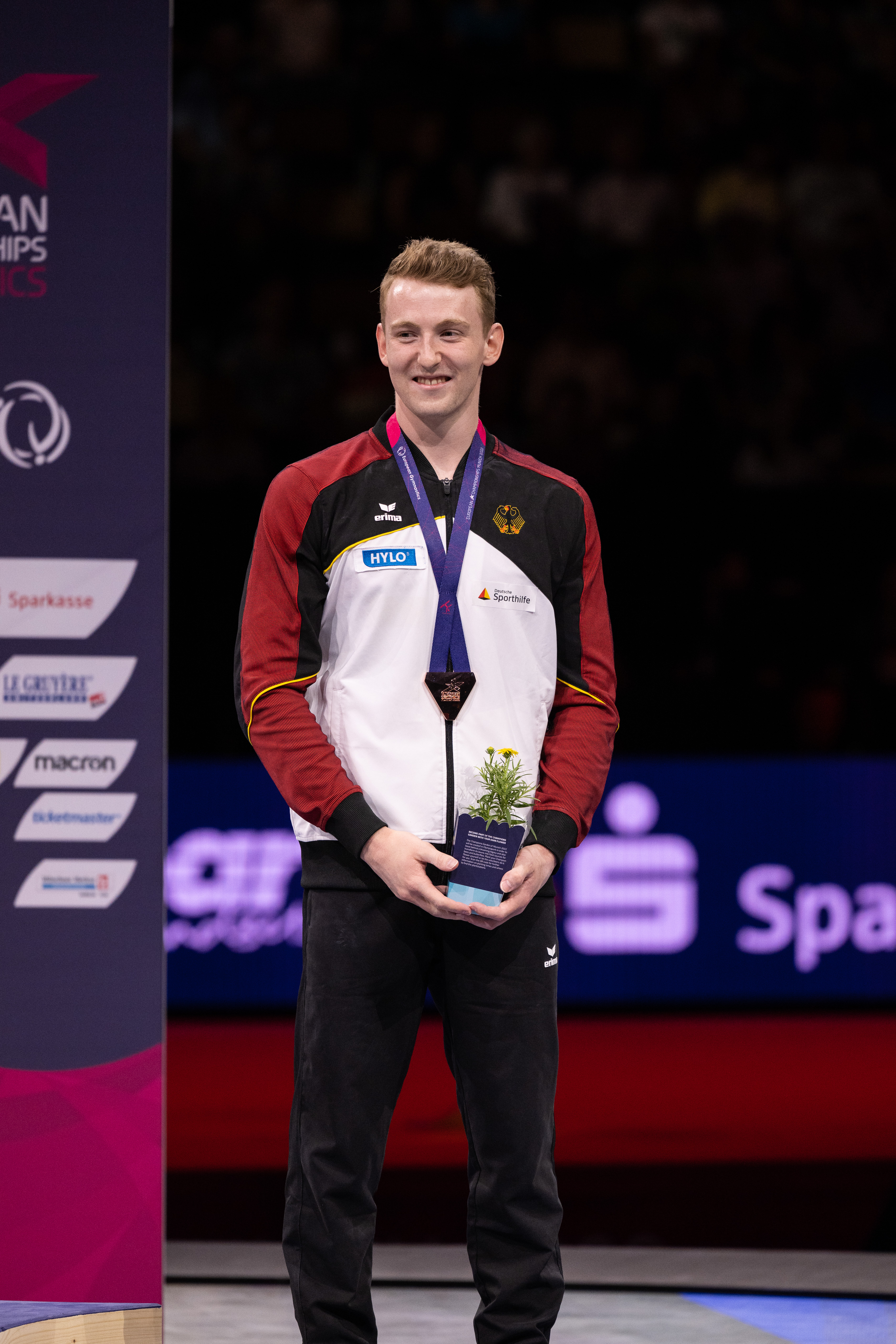
- Dunkel at the 2022 European Championships

Personal information
- Born: 20 February 1997 (age 29) Erfurt, Thuringia, Germany
- Height: 173 cm (5 ft 8 in)

Gymnastics career
- Discipline: Men's artistic gymnastics
- Country represented: Germany
- Club: SV Halle
- Head coach: Hubert Brylok
Medal record
Men's artistic gymnastics
Representing Germany
European Championships
Gold medal – first place	2025 Leipzig	Parallel bars
Bronze medal – third place	2022 Munich	Pommel horse

Nils Dunkel (born 20 February 1997) is a German artistic gymnast. He is the 2025 European parallel bars champion. He won a bronze medal on the pommel horse at the 2022 European Championships. He represented Germany at the 2020 and 2024 Olympic Games.

== Gymnastics career ==
Dunkel began gymnastics at age four because his father, Stephan Dunkel, is a coach at the MTV Erfurt club.

=== 2014–2017 ===
He competed at the 2014 Junior European Championships and finished 21st in the all-around final. He finished fourth in the pommel horse event final. He represented Germany at the 2014 Summer Youth Olympics and finished 12th in the all-around final. There, he also qualified for the parallel bars final and finished eighth. Additionally, he was a reserve for the pommel horse, still rings, and horizontal bar finals.

Dunkel finished eighth on the still rings at the 2016 Cottbus World Cup. He competed at his first World Championships in 2017. He only competed on the floor exercise and did not advance to the final.

=== 2018–2021 ===
Dunkel competed at the 2018 European Championships and helped the German team finish fourth. Individually, he finished fourth in the parallel bars event final. He finished 41st in the all-around during the qualification round of the 2019 European Championships. He was not able to compete at the 2019 World Championships due to a foot injury.

Dunkel could not compete at the 2021 European Championships because he tore ligaments in his ankle right before the event. Eight weeks later, he returned to competition at the German Championships and won the pommel horse title. He also finished second in the all-around at the German Championships, and he placed third in the all-around at the German Olympic Trials. He was selected to represent Germany at the 2020 Summer Olympics, held in 2021 due to the COVID-19 pandemic, alongside Lukas Dauser, Philipp Herder, and Andreas Toba. The team qualified for the team final and finished in eighth place.

=== 2022–2023 ===
Dunkel finished fifth on the pommel horse at the 2022 Cottbus World Cup. Then at the European Championships, he helped the German team place seventh. Individually, he won the bronze medal on the pommel horse behind Harutyun Merdinyan and Loran de Munck. This was his first medal at an international competition. He then competed alongside Lukas Dauser, Pascal Brendel, Glenn Trebing, and Andreas Toba at the 2022 World Championships, and they placed ninth in the qualification round, making them the first reserves for the team final.

Dunkel finished sixth on the parallel bars at the 2023 Cottbus World Cup. Then at the 2023 European Championships, he helped the German team finish fifth. He then competed at the 2023 World Championships and helped Germany qualify for the team final where they finished sixth. Individually, Dunkel qualified for the pommel horse final and finished seventh.

=== 2024–2025 ===
At the 2024 DTB Pokal Stuttgart, Dunkel won a bronze medal on the pommel horse. He was then selected to represent Germany at the 2024 Summer Olympics alongside Lukas Dauser, Pascal Brendel, Timo Eder, and Andreas Toba. The team finished 11th in the qualification round and did not advance to the final. Dunkel did advance to the individual all-around final, where he finished 18th. He was also the second reserve for the pommel horse final.

== Competitive history ==
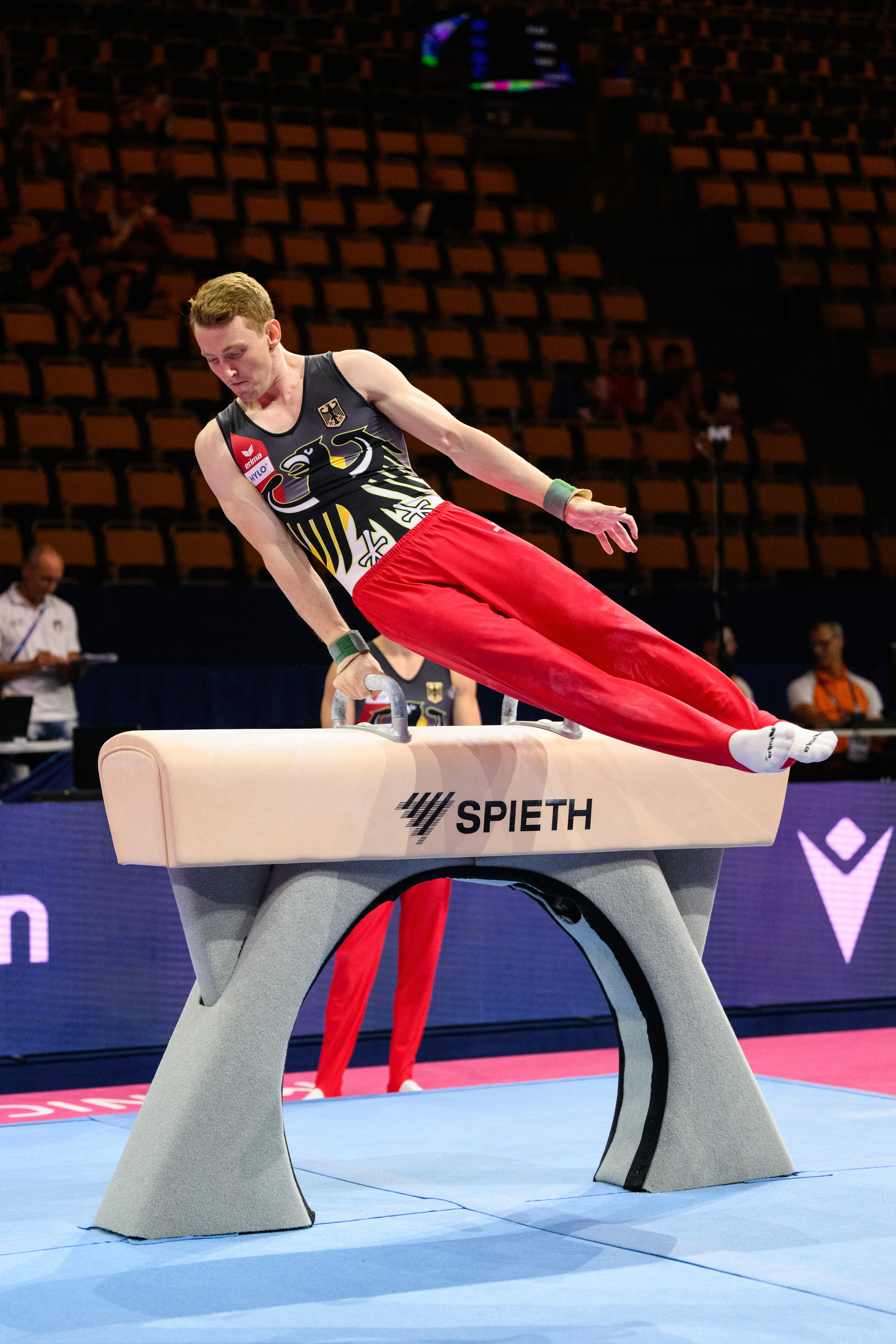
Dunkel competing pommel horse at the 2022 European Championships

Competitive history of Nils Dunkel
Year	Event	Team	AA	FX	PH	SR	VT	PB	HB
2014
2014	Junior European Championships		21		4				
2014	Youth Olympic Games		12		R2	R2		8	R3
2016	Cottbus World Cup					8			
2018
2018	European Championships	4						4	
2021
2021	Olympic Games	8							
2022	Cottbus World Cup				5				
2022	European Championships	7			3rd place, bronze medalist(s)				
2022	World Championships	R1							
2023	Cottbus World Cup							6	
2023	European Championships	5							
2023	World Championships	6			7				
2024	DTB Pokal Stuttgart	5			3rd place, bronze medalist(s)				
2024	Olympic Games	11	18		R2				
2025	DTB Pokal Team Challenge	6						5	
2025	DTB Pokal Mixed Cup	2nd place, silver medalist(s)							
2025	Varna World Challenge Cup					5			
2025	European Championships	4	5					1st place, gold medalist(s)	
2025	German Championships				1st place, gold medalist(s)			2nd place, silver medalist(s)	
2025	World Championships	—N/a	R2						
2025	Arthur Gander Memorial		8						
2026	DTB Pokal Team Challenge	5							
2026	DTB Pokal Mixed Cup	1st place, gold medalist(s)							
2026	Koper World Challenge Cup				8				
2026	World Championships	15							
