= Nikita Nagornyy =

Russian artistic gymnast

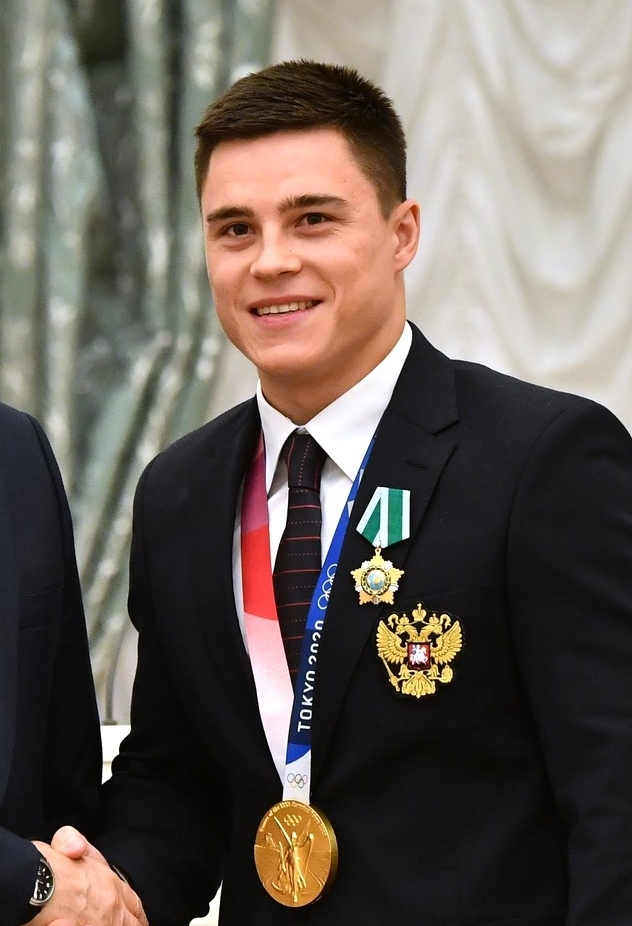
- Nagornyy in 2021

Personal information
- Full name: Nikita Vladimirovich Nagornyy
- Nickname: A lion
- Born: 12 February 1997 (age 29) Rostov-on-Don, Russia
- Height: 168 cm (5 ft 6 in)
- Spouse: Daria Spiridonova (m. 2018)

Gymnastics career
- Discipline: Men's artistic gymnastics
- Country represented: Russia; (2014–2024)
- Club: Dynamo Moscow
- Assistant coach: Anatoly Zabelin
- Eponymous skills: Nagornyy (Floor) – Triple Back Pike (J)
Medal record
Representing Russia & ROC
Event	1st	2nd	3rd
Olympic Games	1	1	2
World Championships	3	1	1
European Championships	8	2	1
Youth Olympic Games	3	1	1
Total	15	5	5
Representing ROC
Olympic Games
Gold medal – first place	2020 Tokyo	Team
Bronze medal – third place	2020 Tokyo	All-Around
Bronze medal – third place	2020 Tokyo	Horizontal Bar
Representing Russia
Olympic Games
Silver medal – second place	2016 Rio de Janeiro	Team
World Championships
Gold medal – first place	2019 Stuttgart	Team
Gold medal – first place	2019 Stuttgart	All-Around
Gold medal – first place	2019 Stuttgart	Vault
Silver medal – second place	2018 Doha	Team
Bronze medal – third place	2018 Doha	All-Around
European Championships
Gold medal – first place	2015 Montpellier	Vault
Gold medal – first place	2016 Bern	Team
Gold medal – first place	2016 Bern	Floor Exercise
Gold medal – first place	2018 Glasgow	Team
Gold medal – first place	2019 Szczecin	All-Around
Gold medal – first place	2019 Szczecin	Parallel Bars
Gold medal – first place	2021 Basel	All-Around
Gold medal – first place	2021 Basel	Floor Exercise
Silver medal – second place	2021 Basel	Pommel Horse
Silver medal – second place	2021 Basel	Rings
Bronze medal – third place	2017 Cluj-Napoca	Parallel Bars
Youth Olympic Games
Gold medal – first place	2014 Nanjing	Pommel Horse
Gold medal – first place	2014 Nanjing	Rings
Gold medal – first place	2014 Nanjing	Parallel Bars
Silver medal – second place	2014 Nanjing	All-Around
Bronze medal – third place	2014 Nanjing	Vault

Nikita Vladimirovich Nagornyy (Russian: Никита Владимирович Нагорный, IPA: [nʲɪˈkʲitə nɐˈɡornɨɪ̯], born 12 February 1997 in Rostov-on-Don, Rostov Oblast, Russia) is a Russian artistic gymnast and two-time Olympian, representing Russia in 2016 and ROC in 2020. He was part of the teams who won gold at the 2020 Olympic Games and 2019 World Championships and silver at the 2016 Olympic Games and 2018 World Championships.

Individually, Nagornyy is the 2019 World All-Around Champion and the 2020 Olympic and 2018 World All-Around bronze medalist. He is an eight-time European gold medalist and a three-time Youth Olympic champion.

== Personal life ==
Nagornyy has a YouTube account, and enjoys making YouTube vlogs in his free time. His grandmother is his inspiration. Tasked with disciplining him, she took him to a gymnastics club where one of her friends worked as a coach. Nagornyy has a Spanish language tattoo on his ribs reading salvame y guardame (save and protect me), a reference to a common Russian Orthodox phrase. On December 18, 2018, Nagornyy married fellow Russian gymnast Daria Spiridonova.

=== Activities for the Russian military ===
In September 2016, Nagorny joined the National Guard of Russia. In December 2020, he became the head of the Young Army Cadets National Movement.

In March 2022, he offered to forward gifts to Russian soldiers participating in the 2022 Russian invasion of Ukraine.

== Career ==
Nagornyy began gymnastics aged six, encouraged by his grandmother. His favorite gymnasts are Alexei Nemov and Kohei Uchimura.

Nagornyy was bronze medalist in all-around at the 2014 Russian Championships. Nagornyy was member of the Russian Team that won silver medal at the 2014 European Junior Championships, he qualified for the vault finals and won gold.

Nagornyy was selected to represent Russia in men's gymnastics at the 2014 Summer Youth Olympics in Nanjing, China. He won the all-around silver medal behind Britain's Giarnni Regini-Moran. Nagornyy was the only gymnast to qualify to all 6 event finals. He won gold in (rings, pommel horse, parallel bars), bronze medal in vault, 4th in floor exercise and 8th after a fall on horizontal bars. Nagornyy was the most decorated male artistic gymnast at this Youth Olympics Game with a total of three gold, one silver, and one bronze medal.

=== 2015 ===
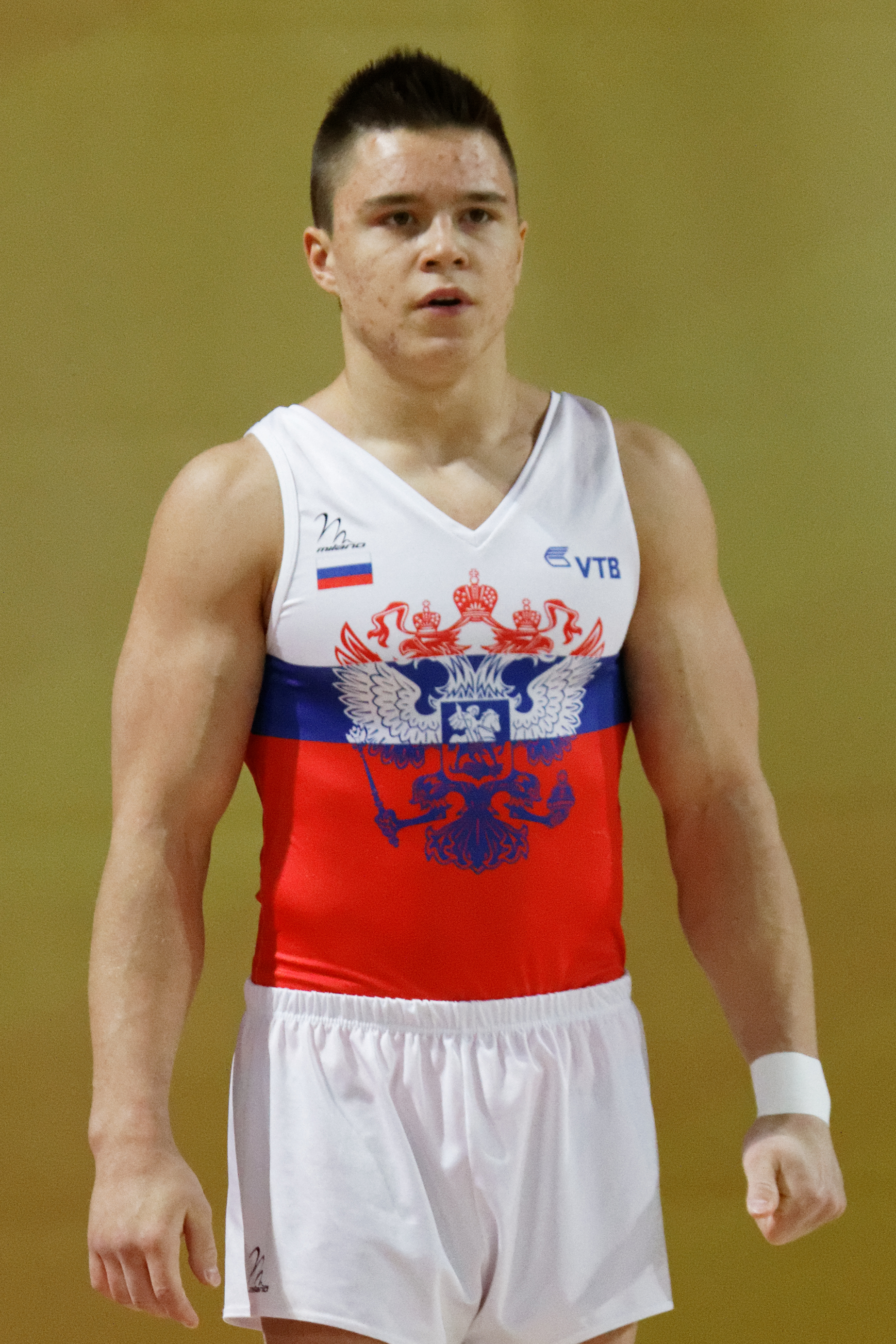
Nagornyy at the 2015 European Championships

Nagornyy's first year as a senior gymnast was 2015. At the 2015 Russian National Championships, his team finished in 4th, and he finished 5th in the all-around. In the event finals, he tied for gold with Denis Ablyazin on both floor and vault and won bronze on parallel bars and high bar. He was then selected to compete floor and vault at the 2015 European Championships.

Nagornyy qualified first for the vault final at the 2015 European Championships with a 15.050. However, he only finished 41st in the floor qualifications with a 14.100 due to a near-fall and several steps out of bounds. In the vault final, he won the European title with a 15.099. His teammate, Denis Ablyazin, was only 0.016 behind him.

At the 2015 World Championships in Glasgow Nagornyy competed floor and vault in the Team Final to contribute to the Russian Team's 4th-place finish.

=== 2016 ===
At the 2016 Russian National Championships Nagornyy's Team placed 3rd, winning the bronze medal. In the All Around Nagornyy was in 3rd place after the first day with a score of 89.033. On the second day he placed second with a score of 89.166 to give him a combined score of 178.199 which won him the silver medal behind Nikolai Kuksenkov and ahead of former National and European Champion David Belyavskiy. In event finals he won gold on floor ahead of 2014 World Champion Denis Ablyazin and also won silver medals on vault, rings and parallel bars.

Nagornyy was part of the Russia team for the 2016 European Championships. In qualifications he competed on every event except high bar, helping Russia to qualify in first place for the Team Final and qualifying to 3 Event Finals: Floor, Vault and Parallel Bars. In Team finals he again competed on 5 events, helping the team to win gold with a score of 271.378, nearly 3 points ahead of Great Britain. In Event Finals he became European Champion on Floor with a score of 15.566, also placing 6th in the Vault final with an average of 14.916 after a mistake on his second vault, and 7th in the Parallel Bars final with a score of 14.100 after a fall.

On August 6–16, Nagornyy competed with the Russian Team (together with Ivan Stretovich, Denis Ablyazin, Nikolai Kuksenkov and David Belyavskiy) at the 2016 Summer Olympics in Rio de Janeiro, he contributed scores of 15.000 in floor, 14.866 in rings, 15.400 vault; helping the Russian men's team win the silver medal with a total of 271.453 points. Nagornyy also qualified in the vault finals where he finished in 5th place.

=== 2017 ===
Due to a foot injury from the end of 2016, Nagornyy did not compete in the All Around at 2017 Russian National Championships. He competed on 4 events- Pommel Horse, Rings, Parallel Bars and High Bar. He won the national Parallel Bars title with a score of 15.066. Nagornyy also placed 7th in the Pommel Horse Final and 4th in the High Bar final, after falls on both events. At the 2017 European Championships, not fully healed from the injury; Nagornyy did not compete in the all-around. He qualified in 1 apparatus final and won a bronze in Parallel Bars. Nagornyy won the all-around at the Russian Cup held in Ekaterinburg beating hometown competitor David Belyavskiy. In the Apparatus Finals, he qualified in 5 out of 6 events winning 2 gold medals in Floor Exercise and Vault (tied with Artur Dalaloyan) and 3 bronze medals in Pommel Horse, Rings and High Bar. At the 2017 World Artistic Gymnastics Championships Nagornyy had falls on floor and vault in qualifications, and did not qualify for any apparatus finals, although did make it into the All Around final, where he placed 10th after falling on high bar.

In December, Nagornyy competed at the Voronin Cup, where he won the all-around competition, as well as gold on floor and parallel bars, and silver on pommel horse.

=== 2018 ===
Nagornyy competed at the 2018 Birmingham World Cup, where he won the silver medal in the All Around. At the 2018 Russian Artistic Gymnastics Championships, Nagornyy once again did not compete on all 6 events due to injury, competing 4 events- pommel horse, rings, parallel bars and high bar. He won a bronze medal on pommel horse, making him the only active Russian male gymnast to have National medals on all 6 events. He also defended his title on parallel bars, and won his first National high bar title, as well as placing 5th in the rings final.

At the 2018 Russian Cup, still not fully recovered from injury, Nagornyy competed on 5 events- everything except for vault. He won the floor title, placed 5th in the rings final and 6th in the parallel bars final. He went on to compete at the 2018 European Men's Artistic Gymnastics Championships where he competed 5 events in qualifications, and all 6 in the Team Final to help the Russian team to their third consecutive European team title. Nagornyy qualified to the floor and rings finals, placing 4th in both. He also placed 3rd on parallel bars in qualifications, behind teammates David Belyavskiy and Artur Dalaloyan, however did not advance to the final due to the rule that only 2 gymnasts per country may compete in a final.

At the 2018 World Artistic Gymnastics Championships, Nagornyy competed on all 6 events, helping the Russian team to qualify in first place and qualifying in second place to the All Around Final, as well as to 4 apparatus finals- floor, pommel horse, rings and vault. He was also the only gymnast to place in the top 20 on every event in qualifications. In the team final Nagornyy competed on all 6 events, helping the Russian team to the silver medal- their first World team medal since 2006 and Nagornyy's first World medal. They placed 2nd behind China by only 0.049 points. In the All Around final, Nagornyy won the bronze medal behind teammate Artur Dalaloyan, who became the 2018 World Champion, and 2017 Champion Xiao Ruoteng. This was the first time two Russian gymnasts had been on a World All Around podium together, and the first time any Russian man had won a World All Around medal since 2009. In the event finals, Nagornyy placed 6th on floor and pommel horse, and 5th on rings and vault.

=== 2019 ===
Nagornyy started his year at the 2019 Russian Artistic Gymnastics Championships where he was able to compete on all 6 events for the first time since 2016. In qualifications he placed first in the All Around and qualified to all 6 event finals. He then went on to win his first National All Around title, winning by over 6 points after 2 days of combined scores. In the event finals, he won every event except floor where he won the silver medal after going out of bounds in his routine. Nagornyy won his first National titles on pommel horse and rings, making him the only active Russian gymnast to have National titles on all 6 events, as well as taking his 3rd consecutive parallel bars title and defending his high bar title from the previous year.

At the 2019 World Artistic Gymnastics Championships in Stuttgart, Germany, Nagornyy helped Russia to win gold in the team event, almost one-full point ahead of 2018 champion China, and Japan. Nagornyy qualified first for the all-around event, and successfully retained that position in the final with a total score of 88.772, ahead of compatriot and also reigning champion, Artur Dalaloyan, and Olympic gold medalist Oleg Verniaiev. He also qualified for floor exercise and vault apparatus finals, and was a reserve for horizontal bar and parallel bar. He won another gold medal in the vault event, narrowly beating Dalaloyan who won silver.

=== 2020 ===
In January it was announced that Nagornyy would represent Russia at the American Cup, taking place on March 7. However, in late February Nagornyy and Lilia Akhaimova announced on Instagram that Russia withdrew from the upcoming competition due to the escalation of coronavirus worldwide. Nargornyy later was selected to compete at the Birmingham World Cup, which was then postponed.

=== 2021 ===
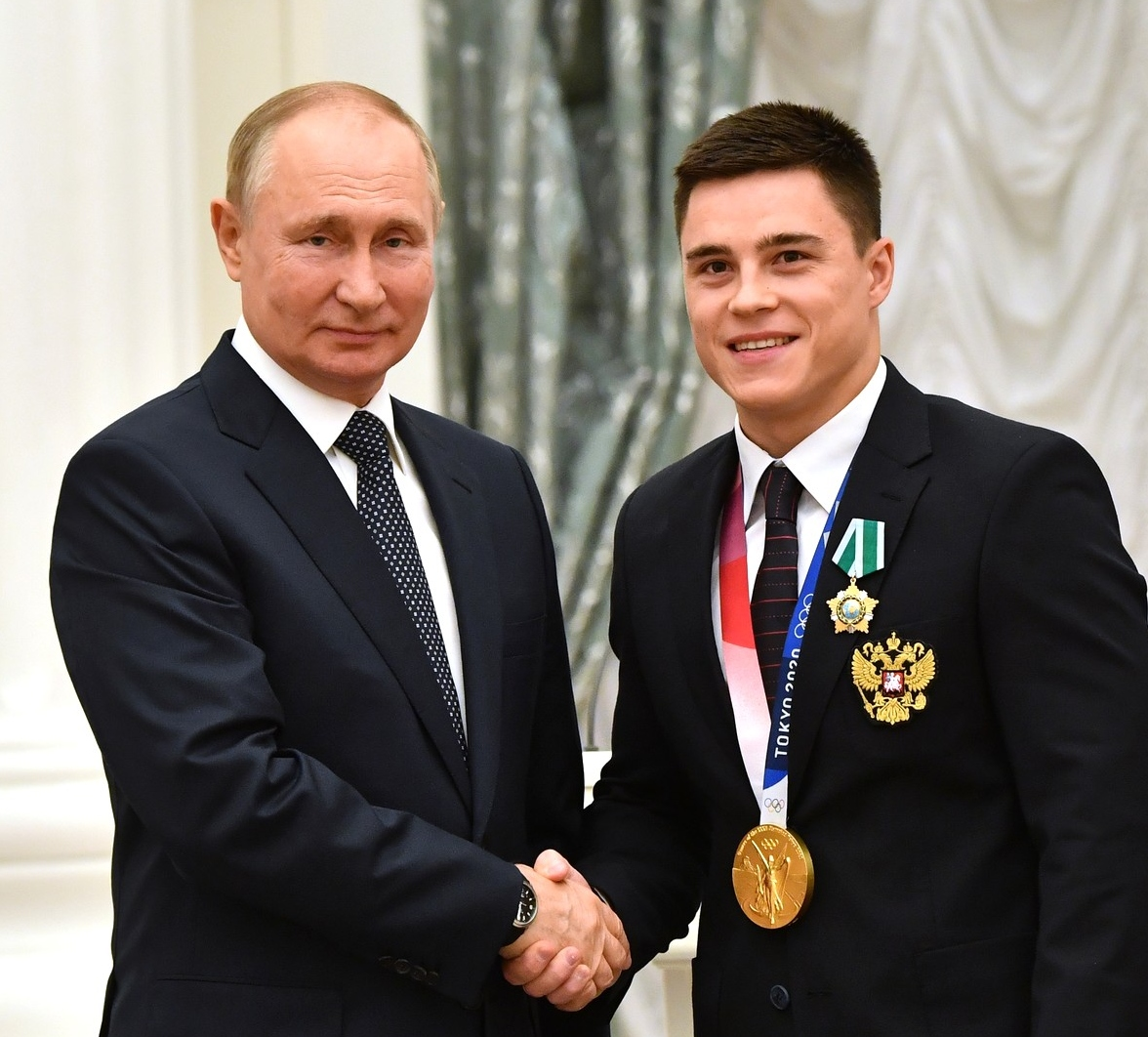
Nagornyy receives the Order of Friendship from Vladimir Putin in 2021

Nagornyy was scheduled to compete at the 2021 Russian Championships but withdrew because of a throat infection. He then started his International 2021 season at the 2021 European Championships. He qualified first to the All Around with a combined score of 87.097. He qualified to every apparatus final except horizontal bar, where he was the first reserve. Nagornyy debuted a new skill on floor; a triple back pike, which was then named after him in the Code of Points. The Nagornyy was the first skill graded with the highest I value (0.9).

At the 2020 Summer Olympics in Tokyo Nagornyy competed with the Russian Olympic Committee, a team including Denis Ablyazin, David Belyavskiy, and Artur Dalaloyan. Nagornyy helped the team qualify to the team final in third place and individually qualified to the all-around, floor exercise, vault, and horizontal bar event finals. During the team final Nagornyy competed on all six events and helped the team finish first with a combined score of 262.5. This was the first team Olympic gold medal for Russia in 25 years. During the all-around final Nagornyy won the bronze medal behind Hashimoto Daiki and Xiao Ruoteng. He qualified for the event finals for floor exercise, vault and horizontal bar. He finished seventh on floor, fifth on vault and won a bronze medal (his second individual medal and fourth overall) on the horizontal bar after scoring 14.533.

On 11 September, he along with his Olympic Team were awarded with Order of Friendship by President Vladimir Putin. In November Nagornyy competed at the Arthur Gander Memorial. He placed second in the four-event all-around after losing the tie-breaker to Yul Moldauer of the United States.

In May 2022, it was announced that Nagorny would join the Sakhalin Football Club as a player.

At the 2023 Russian Championships in Kazan, Nagorny sensationally lost in the all-around to Daniel Marinov, becoming the second. But Nikita still took two more gold medals in individual exercises. He became the best on the uneven bars and in the vault.

In June 2024, at the BRICS Games, he won gold in the vault and silver in floor exercises.

In October 2024, he initiated the creation of the Gymnastics Premier League in Russia.

== Personal life and social activities ==
Nagorny's grandfather played football for Rostselmash Rostov and the Armenian national team.

In 2018, Nikita Nagorny married Olympic medalist, world and European champion in artistic gymnastics Daria Spiridonova. On June 21, 2023, the couple had a son. In February 2026, Daria and Nikita announced they are currently expecting their second child, a girl.

In addition to their sports career, the couple are engaged in entrepreneurial activities. He is a soldier of the Russian National Guard. He holds the military rank of "Junior Lieutenant" (2016).

In December 2020, he became the head of the All-Russian Children's and Youth movement "Yunarmiya" (he was appointed Chief of the General Staff of the Military Academy "Yunarmiya"). In 2022, he invited his fans to send gifts to help the Russian military personnel involved in the invasion of Ukraine.

In 2023, he joined the initiative group to nominate Vladimir Putin as a candidate for the presidential election in 2024. In 2024, he was a confidant of Russian presidential candidate Vladimir Putin.

In 2025, he became a participant in the second season of the show "Titans" on TNT, where his wife took part a year earlier.

== Sanctions ==
After the Russian invasion, the National Agency for the Prevention of Corruption of Ukraine took the initiative to impose international sanctions against Nagorny for supporting the "aggressive policy of the Putin regime" and as involved in the propaganda of the war in Ukraine.

On September 22, 2023, Nagorny was included in Canada's sanctions list of "associates of the Russian regime and agents of disinformation" against those involved in the deportation of Ukrainian children to Russia and "the creation and dissemination of disinformation and propaganda funded by the Kremlin." On June 12, 2024, Nagorny was placed on the US blocking sanctions list against those responsible for the forced deportation, re-education and militarization of Ukrainian children from Russian-occupied regions of Ukraine. In November, he was included in the UK sanctions lists. In February 2025, he was also included in the sanctions list of the European Union. On April 18, it became known that he was included in the sanctions list of Ukraine for a period of 10 years.

== Awards ==
- Medal of the Order of Merit for the Fatherland, 1st class (August 25, 2016) — for outstanding sporting achievements at the Games of the XXXI Olympic Games in 2016 in Rio de Janeiro (Brazil), for showing the will to win and determination.
- Order of Friendship (August 11, 2021) — for his great contribution to the development of domestic sports, high sporting achievements, the will to win, perseverance and determination shown at the Games of the XXXII Olympic Games 2020 (2021 due to the postponement due to COVID-19) in Tokyo (Japan).
- Honored Master of Sports of Russia (2016).

== Competitive history ==
Year	Event	Team	AA	FX	PH	SR	VT	PB	HB
Junior
2013	Olympic Hopes Penza	1st place, gold medalist(s)	5	2nd place, silver medalist(s)		1st place, gold medalist(s)			
2013	Voronin Junior Cup			1st place, gold medalist(s)				7	3rd place, bronze medalist(s)
2014	Russian Junior Championships		3rd place, bronze medalist(s)						
2014	2014 European Junior Championships	2nd place, silver medalist(s)				9	1st place, gold medalist(s)		
2014	Youth Olympic Games		2nd place, silver medalist(s)	4	1st place, gold medalist(s)	3rd place, bronze medalist(s)	1st place, gold medalist(s)	8	
Senior
2015	National Championships	4	5	1st place, gold medalist(s)			1st place, gold medalist(s)	3rd place, bronze medalist(s)	
2015	European Championships						1st place, gold medalist(s)		
2015	World Championships	4							
2016	National Championships	3rd place, bronze medalist(s)	2nd place, silver medalist(s)	1st place, gold medalist(s)		2nd place, silver medalist(s)			
2016	Osijek World Cup					5	4	7	
2016	European Championships	1st place, gold medalist(s)		1st place, gold medalist(s)			6	7	
2016	Olympic Games	2nd place, silver medalist(s)					5		
2017	National Championships	1st place, gold medalist(s)			7			1st place, gold medalist(s)	4
2017	European Championships							3rd place, bronze medalist(s)	
2017	Russian Cup	1st place, gold medalist(s)	1st place, gold medalist(s)	1st place, gold medalist(s)	3rd place, bronze medalist(s)	3rd place, bronze medalist(s)	1st place, gold medalist(s)	4	3rd place, bronze medalist(s)
2017	World Championships		10						
2017	Voronin Cup		1st place, gold medalist(s)	1st place, gold medalist(s)	2nd place, silver medalist(s)			1st place, gold medalist(s)	
2018	National Championships	1st place, gold medalist(s)			3rd place, bronze medalist(s)	5		1st place, gold medalist(s)	1st place, gold medalist(s)
2018	European Championships	1st place, gold medalist(s)		4		4			
2018	Birmingham World Cup		2nd place, silver medalist(s)						
2018	Russian Cup	1st place, gold medalist(s)		1st place, gold medalist(s)		5		6	
2018	World Championships	2nd place, silver medalist(s)	3rd place, bronze medalist(s)	6	6	5	5		
2018	Arthur Gander Memorial		2nd place, silver medalist(s)						
2018	Swiss Cup	2nd place, silver medalist(s)							
2018	Toyota International			3rd place, bronze medalist(s)	8	1st place, gold medalist(s)	5	6	1st place, gold medalist(s)
2019	National Championships	2nd place, silver medalist(s)	1st place, gold medalist(s)	2nd place, silver medalist(s)	1st place, gold medalist(s)				
2019	European Championships		1st place, gold medalist(s)		4	4		1st place, gold medalist(s)	
2019	Birmingham World Cup		1st place, gold medalist(s)						
2019	Russian Cup		1st place, gold medalist(s)	1st place, gold medalist(s)	4	5	3rd place, bronze medalist(s)		
2019	World Championships	1st place, gold medalist(s)	1st place, gold medalist(s)	6			1st place, gold medalist(s)		
2020	Friendship & Solidarity Meet	1st place, gold medalist(s)							
2021
2021	European Championships		1st place, gold medalist(s)	1st place, gold medalist(s)	2nd place, silver medalist(s)	2nd place, silver medalist(s)	7	6	
2021	Russian Cup		1st place, gold medalist(s)	8	3rd place, bronze medalist(s)	8	1st place, gold medalist(s)	2nd place, silver medalist(s)	
2021	Olympic Games	1st place, gold medalist(s)	3rd place, bronze medalist(s)	7			5		3rd place, bronze medalist(s)
2021	Arthur Gander Memorial		2nd place, silver medalist(s)						
2021	Swiss Cup	1st place, gold medalist(s)							

== See also ==
- List of Olympic male artistic gymnasts for Russia
- List of Youth Olympic Games gold medalists who won Olympic gold medals
