= Giarnni Regini-Moran =

British artistic gymnast

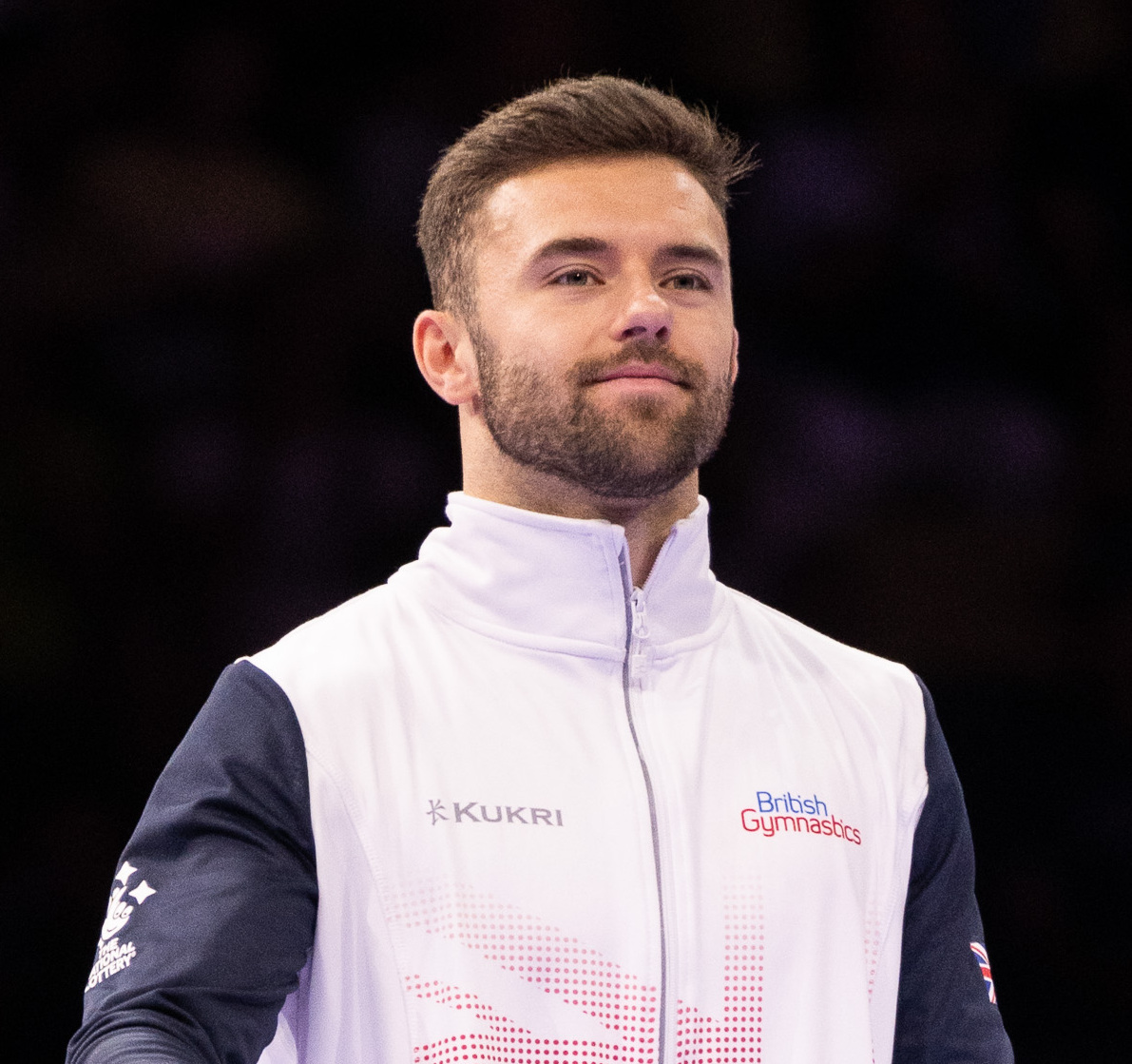
- Regini-Moran at the 2022 European Championships

Personal information
- Full name: Giarnni Lorenzo Regini-Moran
- Born: 2 August 1998 (age 28) Great Yarmouth, England
- Height: 1.66 m (5 ft 5 in)

Gymnastics career
- Discipline: Men's artistic gymnastics
- Country represented: (United Kingdom) Great Britain; England (2013–2024)
- Club: Pegasus Gymnastics Club
Medal record
Men's artistic gymnastics
Representing Great Britain
World Championships
Gold medal – first place	2022 Liverpool	Floor Exercise
Bronze medal – third place	2022 Liverpool	Team
European Championships
Gold medal – first place	2022 Munich	Team
Bronze medal – third place	2021 Basel	Vault
Bronze medal – third place	2022 Munich	Parallel Bars
European Games
Silver medal – second place	2019 Minsk	Floor Exercise
Youth Olympic Games
Gold medal – first place	2014 Nanjing	All-Around
Gold medal – first place	2014 Nanjing	Floor Exercise
Gold medal – first place	2014 Nanjing	Vault
Bronze medal – third place	2014 Nanjing	Parallel Bars
Bronze medal – third place	2014 Nanjing	Horizontal Bar
Representing England
Commonwealth Games
Gold medal – first place	2022 Birmingham	Team
Silver medal – second place	2022 Birmingham	Vault
Silver medal – second place	2022 Birmingham	Parallel Bars
Bronze medal – third place	2022 Birmingham	Floor Exercise

Giarnni Lorenzo Regini-Moran (born 2 August 1998) is a British artistic gymnast representing Great Britain and England internationally. He is the 2022 world champion on floor exercise (the second British world floor champion after Beth Tweddle and the first British male) and the fourth British world champion in the sport of artistic gymnastics (after Tweddle, Max Whitlock, and Joe Fraser).

A junior, Regini-Moran is the 2014 Youth Olympic all-around, floor and vault champion, the 2016 European Junior all-around and floor champion, and 2014 European Junior floor champion. As a senior, he won team gold at the 2022 European Championships and team bronze at the 2022 World Championships with Great Britain, and team gold at the 2022 Commonwealth Games with England.

== Early life ==
Regini-Moran was born on 2 August 1998 in Great Yarmouth, Great Britain, to Glenn Moran and Kerri Regini. His father is of Irish descent, and his mother is of Italian descent. He studied at St John's Catholic School. His younger brother, Ricco, has competed in artistic gymnastics at the national junior level.

Regini-Moran began gymnastics at age three, then the family moved to the Europa Centre in Crayford where Giarnni trained with coach Pete Etherington. He began competitive gymnastics in 2004. He currently trains at Pegasus Gymnastics Club, coached by Ionut Trandaburu, who also coaches James Hall.

In 2014, Regini-Moran was named Young Sportsperson of the Year at the Great Britain Pride of Sport Awards.

== Gymnastics career ==
=== 2013 ===
In 2013, Regini-Moran's international breakthrough began at the competition in Brasília, Brazil for the 2013 Gymnasiade; he won gold in floor exercise, bronze in parallel bars, and with Team Britain winning the silver medal.

=== 2014 ===
In 2014, Regini-Moran won the British Junior all-around title under 16 years. He was a member of the British Team (together with teammates Brinn Bevan, Joe Fraser, Gaius Thompson and Nile Wilson) that won the gold medal at the 2014 European Junior Championships; he qualified for the floor finals, winning the gold medal.

Regini-Moran was selected to represent Great Britain in men's gymnastics at the 2014 Summer Youth Olympics in Nanjing, China. He won the all-around gold medal ahead of Russia's Nikita Nagornyy and the USA's Alec Yoder. He qualified for four event finals and won two gold medals (vault, floor) and two bronze (parallel bars, high bar).

=== 2016–2018 ===
On 25–29 May 2016, Regini-Moran competed at the 2016 European Junior Championships where Team Great Britain (together with Donell Osbourne, Joe Fraser, Jamie Lewis, Joshua Nathan) won gold ahead of Russia; he also won gold in the all-around ahead of Russia's Andrey Makolov. In the apparatus finals, Regini-Moran won gold in floor, silver in vault and parallel bars, and finished 5th in rings.

In July 2016, Regini-Moran suffered a serious leg injury, damaging multiple knee ligaments and his hamstring and fracturing his tibia, which left him out of contention for the 2016 Summer Olympics. After six hours of reconstructive surgery and a 12-month recovery period, during which he "had to learn to walk again", he was sidelined again after fracturing his ankle on his return to training while attempting a vault. He eventually returned to competitive action in mid-2018.

=== 2019-2020 ===
In May 2019, Regini-Moran competed at the European Games in Minsk, Belarus, with Brinn Bevan and Jake Jarman. He was second on floor exercise and sixth on vault.

In October 2019, he was selected for the British team for the World Championships in Stuttgart, Germany, alongside Dominick Cunningham, Joe Fraser, James Hall, and Max Whitlock. He contributed to Great Britain's fifth-place finish.

Regini-Moran was slated to compete at the 2020 Birmingham World Cup alongside Fraser, but the event was canceled due to the COVID-19 pandemic.

=== 2021 ===
In April, Regini-Moran competed at the European Championships in Basel, Switzerland, where he placed third on vault.

In May, Regini-Moran was selected to compete for Great Britain at the 2020 Summer Olympics in Tokyo, Japan, alongside Fraser, Hall, Whitlock, and Jake Jarman (alternate). In the qualification round, despite not qualifying for any event finals, his highest finish was 12th on floor, barely missing out on an alternate spot due to a tiebreaker with Takeru Kitazono (both scoring 14.666). In the team final, he helped the team take fourth place with a score of 255.76.

=== 2022 ===
In 2022, Regini-Moran was part of the same England/Great Britain team roster that competed in three successive competitions, alongside Fraser, Hall, Jarman, and Courtney Tulloch.

In July, Regini-Moran won gold in the team competition at the 2022 Commonwealth Games in Birmingham. He also took home silver in the vault and parallel bars as well as bronze on floor. In August, he won gold with Great Britain at the 2022 European Championships in Munich, Germany. Regini-Moran also qualified for three even finals (floor, vault, and parallel bars), winning the bronze medal on parallel bars and seventh on floor. He withdrew from vault and was replaced by Jarman, who went on to win the event.

Regini-Moran was selected to the British team for the 2022 World Championships in Liverpool, England. In a dramatic comeback, he helped Great Britain win the team bronze medal. After qualifying for the floor exercise final in fourth place, Regini-Moran won the gold medal in front of the home crowd with a 14.533, defeating the world and Olympic individual all-around champion, Daiki Hashimoto of Japan, by a narrow score margin of only 0.033. This was a part of the British sweep of the floor exercise gold medals at those world championships, as fellow Briton Jessica Gadirova won the women's floor exercise gold the next day. Regini-Moran also qualified for the parallel bars final in eighth place and finished one better in seventh.

== Competitive history ==
Competitive history of Giarnni Regini-Moran
Year	Event	Team	AA	FX	PH	SR	VT	PB	HB
2013	Gymnasiade	2nd place, silver medalist(s)		2nd place, silver medalist(s)				3rd place, bronze medalist(s)	
2014
2014	Junior European Championships	1st place, gold medalist(s)		1st place, gold medalist(s)			2nd place, silver medalist(s)		
2014	Youth Olympic Games		1st place, gold medalist(s)	1st place, gold medalist(s)	6		1st place, gold medalist(s)	3rd place, bronze medalist(s)	3rd place, bronze medalist(s)
2016	English Championships		1st place, gold medalist(s)	1st place, gold medalist(s)	3rd place, bronze medalist(s)	1st place, gold medalist(s)	1st place, gold medalist(s)	1st place, gold medalist(s)	2nd place, silver medalist(s)
2016	Junior European Championships	1st place, gold medalist(s)	1st place, gold medalist(s)	1st place, gold medalist(s)		5	2nd place, silver medalist(s)	2nd place, silver medalist(s)	
2018	British Championships							6	
2018	Mersin World Challenge Cup						5		
2018	Africa Safari International			2nd place, silver medalist(s)	3rd place, bronze medalist(s)		2nd place, silver medalist(s)	1st place, gold medalist(s)	
2019	English Championships		3rd place, bronze medalist(s)						
2019	British Championships		2nd place, silver medalist(s)	1st place, gold medalist(s)			2nd place, silver medalist(s)	2nd place, silver medalist(s)	
2019	Doha World Cup						4		
2019	Tokyo World Cup		5						
2019	European Games		13	2nd place, silver medalist(s)			6		
2019	World Championships	5							
2019	Brabant Trophy	4							
2021
2021	European Championships						3rd place, bronze medalist(s)		
2021	Olympic Games	4							
2022	British Championships			2nd place, silver medalist(s)				1st place, gold medalist(s)	
2022	Commonwealth Games	1st place, gold medalist(s)		3rd place, bronze medalist(s)			2nd place, silver medalist(s)	2nd place, silver medalist(s)	
2022	European Championships	1st place, gold medalist(s)		7				3rd place, bronze medalist(s)	
2022	World Championships	3rd place, bronze medalist(s)		1st place, gold medalist(s)				7	
