= Switzerland at the 2014 Summer Youth Olympics =

- IOC code: SUI
- NOC: Swiss Olympic Association
- Website: www.swissolympic.ch

in Nanjing
- Competitors: 19 in 9 sports
- Medals Ranked 36th: Gold 2 Silver 1 Bronze 0 Total 3

Summer Youth Olympics appearances
- 2010; 2014; 2018; 2026

Switzerland competed at the 2014 Summer Youth Olympics, in Nanjing, China from 16 August to 28 August 2014.

== Archery ==
Switzerland qualified a male archer from its performance at the 2014 European Archery Youth Championships.

Individual

Athlete	Event	Ranking round		Round of 32	Round of 16	Quarterfinals	Semifinals	Final / BM	Rank
Athlete	Event	Score	Seed	Opposition Score	Opposition Score	Opposition Score	Opposition Score	Opposition Score	Rank
Florian Faber	Boys' Individual	676	9	Purnama (INA); W 6–2	Han (TPE); W 6–2	Lee (KOR); L 2–6	did not advance		7

Team

Athletes	Event	Ranking round		Round of 32	Round of 16	Quarterfinals	Semifinals	Final / BM	Rank
Athletes	Event	Score	Seed	Opposition Score	Opposition Score	Opposition Score	Opposition Score	Opposition Score	Rank
Florian Faber (SUI); Ralitsa Gencheva (BUL)	Mixed Team	1291	4	D'Almeida (BRA); Abdrazak (KAZ); L 0-6	did not advance				17

== Athletics ==
Switzerland qualified four athletes.

Qualification Legend: Q=Final A (medal); qB=Final B (non-medal); qC=Final C (non-medal); qD=Final D (non-medal); qE=Final E (non-medal)

Boys
Track & road events

Athlete	Event	Heats		Final	
Athlete	Event	Result	Rank	Result	Rank
Tom Elmer	800 m	1:51.12	6 Q	1:52.35	6

Girls
Track & road events

Athlete	Event	Heats		Final	
Athlete	Event	Result	Rank	Result	Rank
Michelle Müller	400 m hurdles	1:00.60	8 Q	59.86	5

Field events

Athlete	Event	Qualification		Final	
Athlete	Event	Distance	Rank	Distance	Rank
Salome Lang	High jump	1.74	9 qB	1.73	5
Angelica Moser	Pole vault	3.80	1 Q	4.36 PB	1st place, gold medalist(s)

== Beach Volleyball ==
Switzerland qualified a team by being the highest ranked nation not yet qualified.

Athletes	Event	Preliminary round	Standing	Round of 24	Round of 16	Quarterfinals	Semifinals	Final / BM	Rank
Athletes	Event	Opposition Score	Standing	Opposition Score	Opposition Score	Opposition Score	Opposition Score	Opposition Score	Rank
Dunja Gerson; Esther Rohrer	Girls'	Conteh/Turay (SLE); W w/o	Q	Mondesir/Noel (LCA); W 2 - 0	Arnholdt/Schneider (GER); L 1 - 2	did not advance			17
Dunja Gerson; Esther Rohrer	Girls'	Caputo/Muno (USA); W 2 – 1	Q	Mondesir/Noel (LCA); W 2 - 0	Arnholdt/Schneider (GER); L 1 - 2	did not advance			17
Dunja Gerson; Esther Rohrer	Girls'	Adamcikova/Valkova (CZE)	Q	Mondesir/Noel (LCA); W 2 - 0	Arnholdt/Schneider (GER); L 1 - 2	did not advance			17
Dunja Gerson; Esther Rohrer	Girls'	Vi/Van (VIE)	Q	Mondesir/Noel (LCA); W 2 - 0	Arnholdt/Schneider (GER); L 1 - 2	did not advance			17
Dunja Gerson; Esther Rohrer	Girls'	Ramos/Lisboa (BRA)	Q	Mondesir/Noel (LCA); W 2 - 0	Arnholdt/Schneider (GER); L 1 - 2	did not advance			17

== Diving ==
Switzerland qualified two quotas based on its performance at the Nanjing 2014 Diving Qualifying Event.

Athlete	Event	Preliminary		Final	
Athlete	Event	Points	Rank	Points	Rank
Guillaume Dutoit	Boys' 3 m springboard	521.25	4	525.05	9
Vivian Barth	Girls' 3 m springboard	362.45	10	383.70	9
Vivian Barth (SUI); Rodrigo Diego (MEX)	Mixed team	—N/a		275.80	11

== Golf ==
Switzerland qualified one athlete based on the 8 June 2014 IGF World Amateur Golf Rankings.

Individual

Athlete	Event	Round 1		Round 2			Round 3			Total	
Athlete	Event	Score	Rank	Score	Total	Rank	Score	Total	Rank	Score	Rank
Azelia Meichtry	Girls	73 (+1)	=11	75 (+3)	148 (+4)		70 (-2)	218 (+2)		218	=8

Team

Athletes	Event	Round 1 (Fourball)		Round 2 (Foursome)		Round 3 (Individual Stroke)				Total	
Athletes	Event	Score	Rank	Score	Rank	Boy	Girl	Total	Rank	Score	Rank
Dou Zecheng (CHN); Azelia Meichtry (SUI)	Mixed	70	22	69		74	77	290		290	=17

== Gymnastics ==
=== Artistic Gymnastics ===
Switzerland qualified one athlete based on its performance at the 2014 European MAG Championships and another athlete based on its performance at the 2014 European WAG Championships.

Boys

Athlete	Event	Apparatus						Total	Rank
Athlete	Event	F	PH	R	V	PB	HB	Total	Rank
Marco Pfyl	Qualification	13.650 12	13.050 14	13.150 13	13.800 23	13.300 8 Q	12.000 27	78.950	12 Q
Marco Pfyl	All-Around	14.000	12.800	12.700	13.950	12.250	11.325	77.025	13
Marco Pfyl	Parallel Bars	—N/a						13.541	5

Girls

Athlete	Event	Apparatus				Total	Rank
Athlete	Event	V	UB	BB	F	Total	Rank
Gaia Nesurini	Qualification	13.600 14	11.975 12	12.300 17	12.450 10	50.425	11 Q
Gaia Nesurini	All-Around	13.650	12.400	11.350	12.350	49.750	13

== Shooting ==
Switzerland was given a wild card to compete.

Individual

Athlete	Event	Qualification		Final	
Athlete	Event	Points	Rank	Points	Rank
Sarah Hornung	Girls' 10m Air Rifle	416.4	1 Q	207.8	1st place, gold medalist(s)

Team

Athletes	Event	Qualification		Round of 16	Quarterfinals	Semifinals	Final / BM	Rank
Athletes	Event	Points	Rank	Opposition Result	Opposition Result	Opposition Result	Opposition Result	Rank
Sarah Hornung (SUI); Chimi Rinzin (BHU)	Mixed Team 10m Air Rifle	793.1	20	did not advance				

== Swimming ==
Switzerland qualified four swimmers.

Boys

Athlete	Event	Heat		Semifinal		Final	
Athlete	Event	Time	Rank	Time	Rank	Time	Rank
Nils Liess	200 m freestyle	—N/a					
Nils Liess	400 m freestyle	3:55.66	10	—N/a		did not advance	
Nils Liess	800 m freestyle	—N/a				DNS	
Nils Liess	200 m backstroke	—N/a					
Nils Liess	100 m butterfly	54.15	5 Q	53.52	3 Q	54.14	6
Nils Liess	200 m butterfly	1:58.44	1 Q	—N/a		1:58.32	4
Luca Pfyffer	50 m breaststroke	29.49	24	did not advance			
Luca Pfyffer	100 m breaststroke	1:03.73	17	did not advance			
Luca Pfyffer	200 m breaststroke	2:16.76	9	—N/a		did not advance	
Luca Pfyffer	200 m individual medley	2:09.28	19	—N/a		did not advance	

Girls

Athlete	Event	Heat		Semifinal		Final	
Athlete	Event	Time	Rank	Time	Rank	Time	Rank
Svenja Stoffel	50 m freestyle	—N/a					
Svenja Stoffel	50 m backstroke	DNS		did not advance			
Svenja Stoffel	100 m backstroke	1:07.14	31	did not advance			
Svenja Stoffel	50 m butterfly	26.93	1 Q	26.89	4 Q	26.62	2nd place, silver medalist(s)
Svenja Stoffel	100 m butterfly	1:01.03	8 Q	1:00.68	9	did not advance	
Lisa Mamie	50 m breaststroke	32.51	12 Q	33.16	16	did not advance	
Lisa Mamie	100 m breaststroke	1:10.44	8 Q	1:10.87	15	did not advance	
Lisa Mamie	200 m breaststroke	2:37.08	19	—N/a		did not advance	
Lisa Mamie	200 m individual medley	2:23.05	21	—N/a		did not advance	

Mixed

Athlete	Event	Heat		Final	
Athlete	Event	Time	Rank	Time	Rank
Nils Liess; Lisa Mamie; Luca Pfyffer; Svenja Stoffel	4×100 m freestyle relay	—N/a			
Nils Liess; Lisa Mamie; Luca Pfyffer; Svenja Stoffel	4×100 m medley relay	—N/a			

== Table Tennis ==
Switzerland qualified one athlete based on its performance at the Road to Nanjing series.

Singles

Athlete	Event	Group Stage	Rank	Round of 16	Quarterfinals	Semifinals	Final / BM	Rank
Athlete	Event	Opposition Score	Rank	Opposition Score	Opposition Score	Opposition Score	Opposition Score	Rank
Elia Schmid	Boys							

Team

Athletes	Event	Group Stage	Rank	Round of 16	Quarterfinals	Semifinals	Final / BM	Rank
Athletes	Event	Opposition Score	Rank	Opposition Score	Opposition Score	Opposition Score	Opposition Score	Rank
Europe 3 Giorgia Piccolin (ITA); Elia Schmid (SUI)	Mixed	Latin America 1 Lorenzotti (URU); Calderano (BRA); L 1-3	3 qB					
Europe 3 Giorgia Piccolin (ITA); Elia Schmid (SUI)	Mixed	Africa 1 Lagsir (ALG); Yahia (TUN); W 3-0	3 qB					
Europe 3 Giorgia Piccolin (ITA); Elia Schmid (SUI)	Mixed	Germany; Wan (GER); Ort (GER); L 0-3	3 qB					

Qualification Legend: Q=Main Bracket (medal); qB=Consolation Bracket (non-medal)

== Tennis ==
Switzerland qualified one athlete based on the 9 June 2014 ITF World Junior Rankings.

Singles

Athlete	Event	Round of 32	Round of 16	Quarterfinals	Semifinals	Final / BM	Rank
Athlete	Event	Opposition Score	Opposition Score	Opposition Score	Opposition Score	Opposition Score	Rank
Jil Belen Teichmann	Girls' Singles	Zarazúa (MEX); W 2-0; 6-3, 7^{12}-6^{10}	Paražinskaitė (LTU); L 1-2; 7^{7}-6^{5}, 2-6, 6^{7}-7^{9}	did not advance			9

Doubles

Athletes	Event	Round of 32	Round of 16	Quarterfinals	Semifinals	Final / BM	Rank
Athletes	Event	Opposition Score	Opposition Score	Opposition Score	Opposition Score	Opposition Score	Rank
Jil Belen Teichmann (SUI); Ivana Jorović (SRB)	Girls' Doubles	—N/a	Ostapenko (LAT); Paražinskaitė (LTU); L 1-2; 3-6, 7^{7}-6^{4}, [8]-[10]	did not advance			9
Jil Belen Teichmann (SUI); Jan Zielinski (POL)	Mixed Doubles	Hon (AUS); Bourchier (AUS); W 2–0 (6–3, 6–4)	Minnen (BEL); Geens (BEL); W 2–0 (7–6, 6–3)	Heinová (CZE); Carey (BAH); W 2–0 (6–3, 6–3)	Ducu (ROU); Zukas (ARG); W 2–0 (6–2, 6–1)	Ye (CHN); Yamasaki (JPN); W 2–1 (4–6, 6–3, 10–4)	1st place, gold medalist(s)
