= Vladyslav Hryko =

Ukrainian artistic gymnast (born 1997)

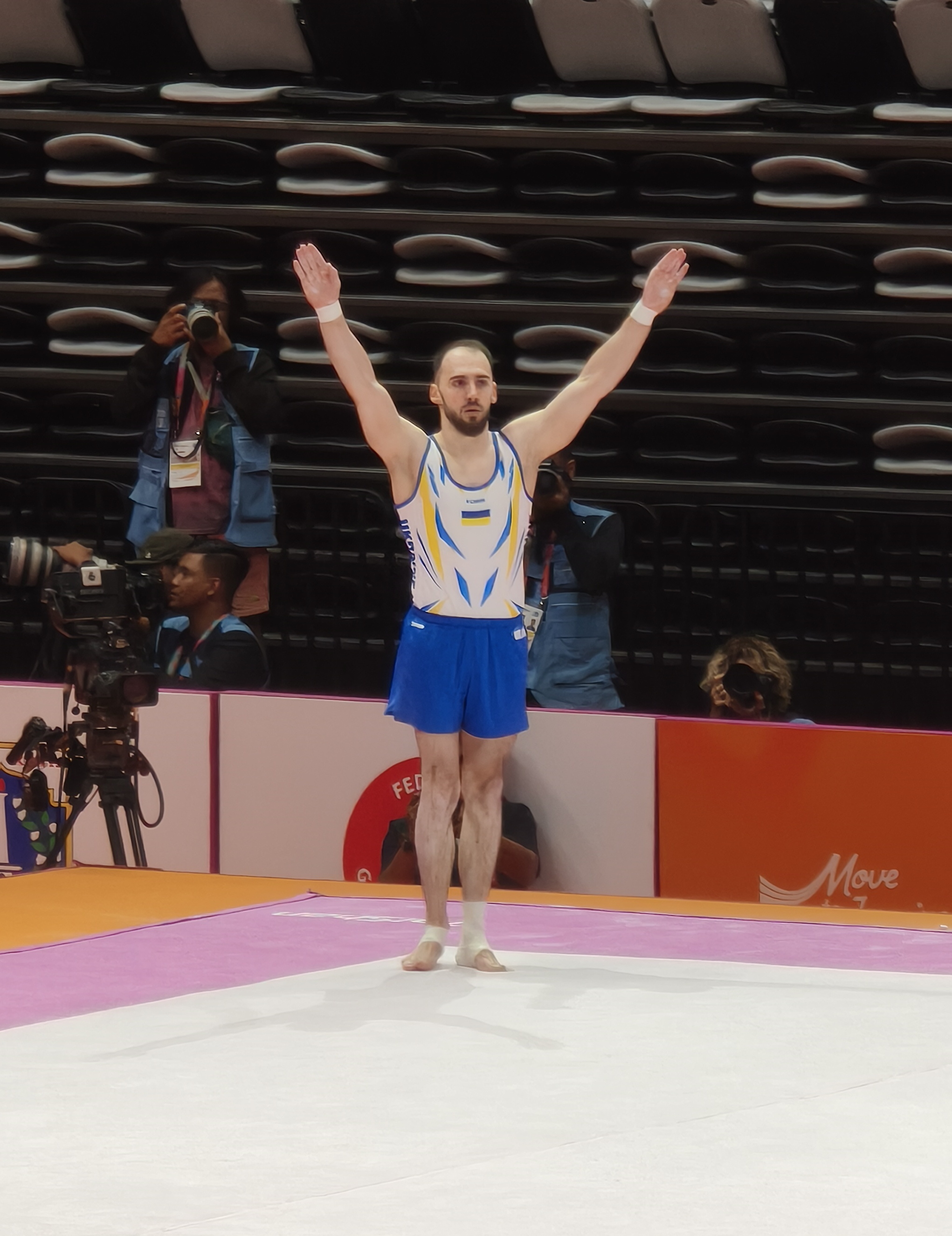
- Hryko at the 2025 World Championships.

Personal information
- Full name: Vladyslav Volodymyrovich Hryko
- Born: 25 January 1997 (age 29) Kharkiv, Ukraine
- Height: 1.69 m (5 ft 7 in)

Gymnastics career
- Discipline: Men's artistic gymnastics
- Country represented: Ukraine; (2012–present (UKR))
Medal record
Representing Ukraine
Men's artistic gymnastics
European Championships
Gold medal – first place	2020 Mersin	Team
Youth Olympic Games
Silver medal – second place	2014 Nanjing	Pommel horse
Bronze medal – third place	2014 Nanjing	Rings
Summer Universiade
Silver medal – second place	2017 Taipei	Team

Vladyslav Volodymyrovich Hryko (Ukrainian: Владислав Володимирович Грико; born January 25, 1997) is a Ukrainian male artistic gymnast and a member of the national team. He participated at the 2015 World Artistic Gymnastics Championships in Glasgow, and qualified for the 2016 Summer Olympics.

Two years before his senior Olympic debut, Hryko secured two medals, a silver in the pommel horse, and a bronze in the rings, at the 2014 Summer Youth Olympics in Nanjing, China.

== Competitive history ==
Year	Event	Team	AA	FX	PH	SR	VT	PB	HB
Junior
2012	Olympic Hopes Penza	2nd place, silver medalist(s)	18	5					
2013	Olympic Hopes Penza	4	13		7				6
2014	International Junior Team Cup	11	67						
2014	European Junior Championships		20		8			15	
2014	Youth Olympic Games		6	9	2nd place, silver medalist(s)	3rd place, bronze medalist(s)	14	10	9
Senior
2016
2016	European Championships	4			11				
2016	Olympic Games	8		54	49	56		43	53
2017	Universiade	2nd place, silver medalist(s)							
2018	DTB Team Challenge	5	8				3rd place, bronze medalist(s)		
2019	Liukin Invitational		6		3rd place, bronze medalist(s)				
2019	Universiade		8	42	11	15		25	14
2020	Ukrainian Championships		3rd place, bronze medalist(s)	2nd place, silver medalist(s)	4			4	1st place, gold medalist(s)
2020	European Championships	1st place, gold medalist(s)		5		12		10	12
2021	World Cup Koper				11	28			19
2021	World Cup Mersin				11	18		10	
2021	World Championships				14				36
2025	Doha World Cup				5				
2025	World Championships	—N/a	22						
2026
2026	European Championships		18						
