= Botond Kardos =

Hungarian gymnast

- Born: 16 September 1997 (age 28) Budapest, Hungary
- Height: 1.64 m (5 ft 5 in)

Gymnastics career
- Discipline: Men's artistic gymnastics
- Country represented: Hungary
- Club: Vasas SC, GYŐRI AC

Botond Kardos (born 16 September 1997) is a Hungarian artistic gymnast.
