= Nanjing Olympic Sports Center Gymnasium =

Sports venue in Nanjing, China

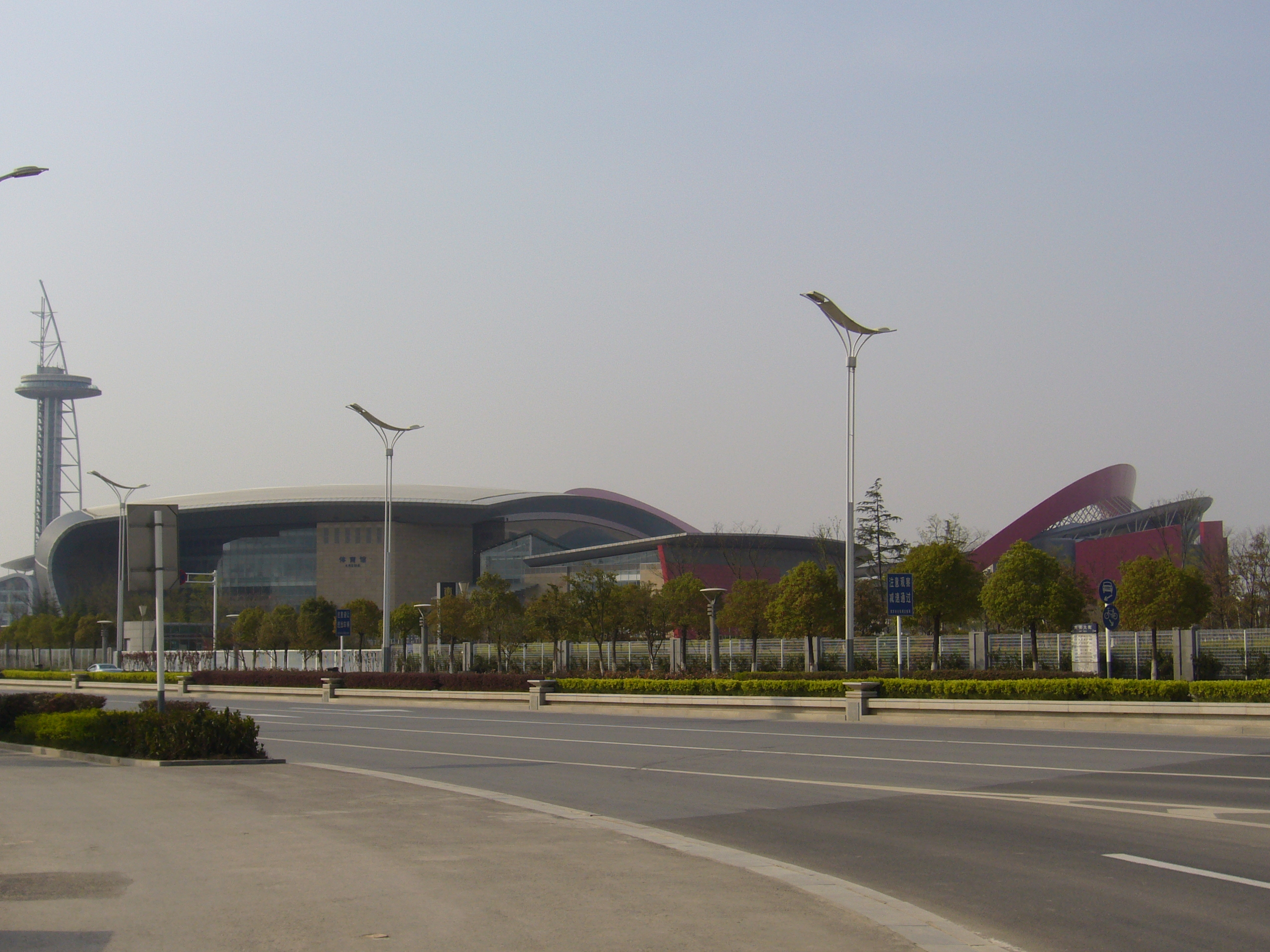
- Interactive map of Nanjing Olympic Sports Center Gymnasium
- Address: 222 Jiangdong Middle Rd, Jianye District, Nanjing, Jiangsu, China 210019
- Coordinates: 32°0′28″N 118°43′10″E
- Owner: Provincial People's Government
- Capacity: 13,000
- Surface: parquet, ice
- Public transit: Olympic Stadium 10; Olympic Stadium East 2 Hexi tram Olympic Stadium East

Construction
- Opened: 2005
- Architect: HOK Sport Venue Event (now Populous)

The Nanjing Olympic Sports Center Gymnasium (Simplified Chinese: 南京奥林匹克体育中心体育馆) is an indoor arena in Nanjing, Jiangsu, China. The arena is mainly used for indoor sports such as basketball and figure skating. The facility has a capacity of 13,000 people and was opened in 2005. It is located near Nanjing Olympic Sports Center Stadium.

== Entertainment events ==
- 17 and 18 January 2009: Super Show – Super Junior
- 12 December 2009: Super Show 2 – Super Junior
- 18 and 20 January: 2009 World Women's Handball Championship, final round with semifinals and finals
- 13 November 2010: Super Show 3 – Super Junior
- 20 August 2011: Shinee World – Shinee
- 21 November 2014: Girls' Generation – 1st Fan Party Mr.Mr.
- 29 March 2015: Super Show 6 – Super Junior
- 9 August 2015: Made World Tour – BigBang

== See also ==
- Nanjing Olympic Sports Center
- List of indoor arenas in China

Preceded by Palais Omnisports de Paris-Bercy; Paris	World Women's Handball Championship; Final Venue; 2009	Succeeded by Ginásio do Ibirapuera; São Paulo
Preceded by Starck Arena; Belgrade	IAAF World Indoor Championships in Athletics; Venue; 2023	Succeeded by
