= Argentina at the 2014 Summer Youth Olympics =

- IOC code: ARG
- NOC: Argentine Olympic Committee
- Website: www.coarg.org.ar (in Spanish)

in Nanjing
- Competitors: 62 in 25 sports
- Flag bearer: Sofía Goicoechea Ruiz (opening) Francisco Saubidet (closing)
- Medals Ranked 41st: Gold 1 Silver 2 Bronze 4 Total 7

Summer Youth Olympics appearances (overview)
- 2010; 2014; 2018; 2026

Argentina competed at the 2014 Summer Youth Olympics, in Nanjing, China from 16 August to 28 August 2014.

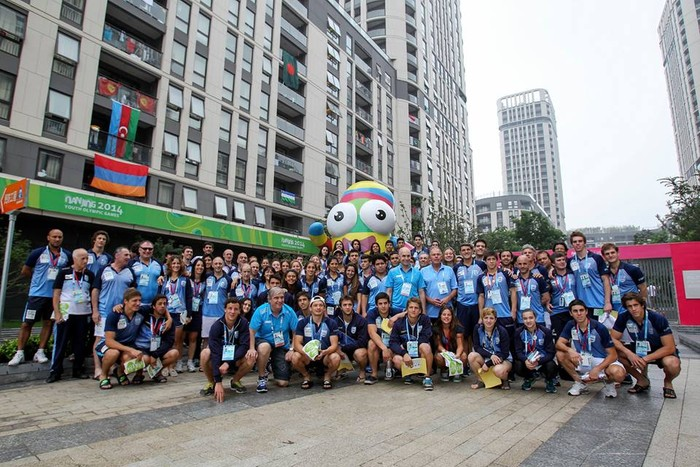
The Argentine delegation at the Youth Olympic Village.

== Medalists ==
Medals awarded to participants of mixed-NOC (Combined) teams are represented in italics. These medals are not counted towards the individual NOC medal tally.

Medal	Name	Sport	Event	Date
Gold	Ayelén Elizeche	Judo	Mixed Team	21 August
Gold	Francisco Saubidet	Sailing	Boys' Techno 293	24 August
Silver	Martina Campi	Equestrian	Team Jumping	20 August
Silver	Argentina boys' national rugby sevens team: José Barros Sosa; Lautaro Bazán Vélez; Vicente Boronat; Enrique Camerlinckx; Juan Cruz Camerlinckx; Juan Ignacio Conil Vila; Manuel de Sousa Carrusca; Bautista Delguy; Indalecio Ledesma; Hugo Miotti; Mariano Romanini; Isaac Sprenger	Rugby Sevens	Boys' Tournament	20 August
Silver	Fernanda Russo	Shooting	Mixed Team 10m Air Rifle	22 August
Silver	Martina Campi	Equestrian	Individual Jumping	24 August
Bronze	Gustavo Basile	Judo	Mixed Team	21 August
Bronze	Michel Divoy; Rodrigo Gerhardt; Juan Pablo Lugrin; José Vildoza	Basketball	Boys' Tournament	26 August
Bronze	Argentina girls' national field hockey team: Cristina Cosentino; Bárbara Dichiara Gentili; Julieta Jankunas; Macarena Losada; María Paula Ortiz; Micaela Retegui; Delfina Thome; Sofía Toccalino; Eugenia Trinchinetti	Field Hockey	Girls' Tournament	26 August
Bronze	Santiago Aulisi; Leandro Aveiro	Beach Volleyball	Boys' Tournament	27 August
Bronze	Sasha Nievas	Weightlifting	Girls' −58 kg	19 August

== Archery ==
Argentina qualified a male archer from its performance at the 2013 World Archery Youth Championships.

Individual

Athlete	Event	Ranking round		Round of 32	Round of 16	Quarterfinals	Semifinals	Final / BM	Rank
Athlete	Event	Score	Seed	Opposition Score	Opposition Score	Opposition Score	Opposition Score	Opposition Score	Rank
Francisco Rodríguez Sas	Boys' Individual	649	20	Fregnan (ITA); W 6–0	van Tongeren (NED); L 2–6	Did not advance			9

Team

Athletes	Event	Ranking round		Round of 32	Round of 16	Quarterfinals	Semifinals	Final / BM	Rank
Athletes	Event	Score	Seed	Opposition Score	Opposition Score	Opposition Score	Opposition Score	Opposition Score	Rank
Francisco Rodríguez Sas (ARG); Ivana Laharnar (SLO)	Mixed Team	1284	16	Koenig (FRA); Rivera (MEX); L 2-6	Did not advance				17

== Athletics ==
Argentina qualified 3 athletes in the following events:

Qualification Legend: Q=Final A (medal); qB=Final B (non-medal); qC=Final C (non-medal); qD=Final D (non-medal); qE=Final E (non-medal)

Boys
Track & road events

Athlete	Event	Heats		Final	
Athlete	Event	Result	Rank	Result	Rank
Daniel Londero	100 m	11.04	13 qB	11.02	12

Field Events

Athlete	Event	Qualification		Final	
Athlete	Event	Distance	Rank	Distance	Rank
Julián Pereyra	Shot put	18.78	7Q	18.64	8

Girls
Track & road events

Athlete	Event	Heats		Final	
Athlete	Event	Result	Rank	Result	Rank
Micaela Levaggi	1500 m	4:32.77	12 qB	4:36.72	13

== Basketball ==
Argentina qualified a boys' team from their performance at the 2013 U18 3x3 World Championships.

=== Boys' tournament ===
Roster

- Michel Divoy
- Rodrigo Gerhardt
- Juan Pablo Lugrin
- José Vildoza

Group Stage

Pos	Team	Pld	W	L	PF	PA	PD	Pts	Qualification
1	Argentina	9	7	2	156	101	+55	16	Round of 16
2	Russia	9	7	2	153	117	+36	16	Round of 16
3	Spain	9	7	2	145	135	+10	16	Round of 16
4	New Zealand	9	6	3	145	129	+16	15	Round of 16
5	Venezuela	9	5	4	136	128	+8	14	Round of 16
6	Brazil	9	4	5	116	92	+24	13 (Note: BRA +5, ROU −5)	Round of 16
7	Romania	9	4	5	130	122	+8	13	Round of 16
8	Tunisia	9	3	6	115	130	−15	12	Round of 16
9	Andorra	9	2	7	129	168	−39	11	Eliminated
10	Guatemala	9	0	9	74	177	−103	9	Eliminated

Notes:

18 August 2014
17:40

Brazil	10–16	Argentina
Pts: Pereira 5		Pts: Vildoza 7

Wutaishan Sports Center, Nanjing

18 August 2014
21:00

Argentina	16–12	Romania
Pts: Vildoza 8		Pts: T. Gheorghe 6

Wutaishan Sports Center, Nanjing

19 August 2014
18:40

New Zealand	9–14	Argentina
Pts: Davidson, Timmins 4		Pts: Vildoza 8

Wutaishan Sports Center, Nanjing

20 August 2014
17:20

Argentina	21–5	Guatemala
Pts: Vildoza 8		Pts: Rosales 4

Wutaishan Sports Center, Nanjing

20 August 2014
21:40

Venezuela	15–21	Argentina
Pts: Garmendia, Materan 5		Pts: Lugrin 11

Wutaishan Sports Center, Nanjing

22 August 2014
19:20

Russia	13–11	Argentina
Pts: Abramovskii 6		Pts: Vildoza 7

Wutaishan Sports Center, Nanjing

23 August 2014
17:00

Argentina	21–9	Tunisia
Pts: Divoy 10		Pts: Hajri 8

Wutaishan Sports Center, Nanjing

23 August 2014
21:20

Andorra	11–21	Argentina
Pts: Lliteras 5		Pts: Vildoza 11

Wutaishan Sports Center, Nanjing

24 August 2014
19:40

Argentina	15–17	Spain

Wutaishan Sports Center, Nanjing

Knockout Stage

Round of 16	Quarterfinals	Semifinals	Final	Rank
Opposition Score	Opposition Score	Opposition Score	Opposition Score	Rank
Uruguay; W 20-13	Venezuela; W 21–13	France; L 14–16	Russia; W 17-14	3rd place, bronze medalist(s)

== Beach Volleyball ==
Argentina qualified a boys' and girls' team from their performance at the 2014 CSV Youth Beach Volleyball Tour.

Athletes	Event	Preliminary round	Standing	Round of 24	Round of 16	Quarterfinals	Semifinals	Final / BM	Rank
Athletes	Event	Opposition Score	Standing	Opposition Score	Opposition Score	Opposition Score	Opposition Score	Opposition Score	Rank
Santiago Aulisi; Leandro Aveiro	Boys'	MacNeil / Richards (CAN); W 21–13, 19–21, 15–12	2	Navickas / Vaskelis (LTU); W	Gauthier / Loiseau (FRA); W 21–11, 21–23, 15-13	Rudolf / Stadie (GER); W 20–22, 21–18, 19-17	Gomez / Hernandez (VEN); L 18–21, 19-21	Määttänen / Sirén (FIN); W 21–10, 12–21, 15-12	3rd place, bronze medalist(s)
Santiago Aulisi; Leandro Aveiro	Boys'	Patrick / Abubakarr (SLE); W w/o	2	Navickas / Vaskelis (LTU); W	Gauthier / Loiseau (FRA); W 21–11, 21–23, 15-13	Rudolf / Stadie (GER); W 20–22, 21–18, 19-17	Gomez / Hernandez (VEN); L 18–21, 19-21	Määttänen / Sirén (FIN); W 21–10, 12–21, 15-12	3rd place, bronze medalist(s)
Santiago Aulisi; Leandro Aveiro	Boys'	Kovalov / Oleh (UKR); L 14–21, 14–21	2	Navickas / Vaskelis (LTU); W	Gauthier / Loiseau (FRA); W 21–11, 21–23, 15-13	Rudolf / Stadie (GER); W 20–22, 21–18, 19-17	Gomez / Hernandez (VEN); L 18–21, 19-21	Määttänen / Sirén (FIN); W 21–10, 12–21, 15-12	3rd place, bronze medalist(s)
Santiago Aulisi; Leandro Aveiro	Boys'	Aloisio / Alex (STP); W 21–11, 21–7	2	Navickas / Vaskelis (LTU); W	Gauthier / Loiseau (FRA); W 21–11, 21–23, 15-13	Rudolf / Stadie (GER); W 20–22, 21–18, 19-17	Gomez / Hernandez (VEN); L 18–21, 19-21	Määttänen / Sirén (FIN); W 21–10, 12–21, 15-12	3rd place, bronze medalist(s)
Santiago Aulisi; Leandro Aveiro	Boys'	J. Surin / N. Banlue (THA); W 21–10, 21–16	2	Navickas / Vaskelis (LTU); W	Gauthier / Loiseau (FRA); W 21–11, 21–23, 15-13	Rudolf / Stadie (GER); W 20–22, 21–18, 19-17	Gomez / Hernandez (VEN); L 18–21, 19-21	Määttänen / Sirén (FIN); W 21–10, 12–21, 15-12	3rd place, bronze medalist(s)
Camila Hiruela; Irene Verasio	Girls'	Makroguzova / Rudykh (RUS); L 27–29, 21–18, 5–15	2	Davidson / Ward (TRI); W 21–13, 21-13	Çetin / Yurtsever (TUR); W 21–9, 21-18	Ramos / Lisboa (BRA); L 24–26, 14-21	Did not advance		9
Camila Hiruela; Irene Verasio	Girls'	Bell / Kendall (AUS); W 23–21, 17–21, 15–10	2	Davidson / Ward (TRI); W 21–13, 21-13	Çetin / Yurtsever (TUR); W 21–9, 21-18	Ramos / Lisboa (BRA); L 24–26, 14-21	Did not advance		9
Camila Hiruela; Irene Verasio	Girls'	Loti / Floflo (VAN); W 21–14, 21–12	2	Davidson / Ward (TRI); W 21–13, 21-13	Çetin / Yurtsever (TUR); W 21–9, 21-18	Ramos / Lisboa (BRA); L 24–26, 14-21	Did not advance		9
Camila Hiruela; Irene Verasio	Girls'	Bernier / Cajigas (PUR); W 23–21, 10–21, 15–11	2	Davidson / Ward (TRI); W 21–13, 21-13	Çetin / Yurtsever (TUR); W 21–9, 21-18	Ramos / Lisboa (BRA); L 24–26, 14-21	Did not advance		9
Camila Hiruela; Irene Verasio	Girls'	Mukantambara / Uwimbabazi (RWA); W 21–7, 21–10	2	Davidson / Ward (TRI); W 21–13, 21-13	Çetin / Yurtsever (TUR); W 21–9, 21-18	Ramos / Lisboa (BRA); L 24–26, 14-21	Did not advance		9

== Boxing ==
Argentina qualified one boxer based on its performance at the 2014 AIBA Youth World Championships

Boys

Athlete	Event	Preliminaries	Semifinals	Final / RM	Rank
Athlete	Event	Opposition Result	Opposition Result	Opposition Result	Rank
Kevin Espíndola	+91 kg	Rock (USA); L w/o	—N/a	Komor (HUN); L w/o	6

== Cycling ==
Argentina qualified a boys' and girls' team based on its ranking issued by the UCI.

Team

Athletes	Event	Cross-Country Eliminator		Time Trial			BMX		Cross-Country Race			Road Race			Total Pts	Rank
Athletes	Event	Rank	Points	Time	Rank	Points	Rank	Points	Time	Rank	Points	Time	Rank	Points	Total Pts	Rank
Franco Vigiani; Nicolás Torres	Boys' Team	7	30	6:24.87	32	0	2	160	58:49	10	10	1:38.11; DNF	43	0	200	7
Fiorella Bosch; Luisina Pesce	Girls' Team	15	2	7:33.36	28	0	6	60	48:47	11	8	1:22:07; DNF	46	0	70	19

Mixed Relay

Athletes	Event	Cross-Country Girls' Race	Cross-Country Boys' Race	Boys' Road Race	Girls' Road Race	Total Time	Rank
Fiorella Bosch; Franco Vigiani; Nicolás Torres; Luisina Pesce	Mixed Team Relay	3:32	3:00	6:24	8:02	20:58	29

== Equestrian ==
Argentina qualified one athlete at the 2013 Equestrian South American Junior Championships.

Athlete	Horse	Event	Round 1		Round 2			Total		Jump-Off		Rank
Athlete	Horse	Event	Penalties	Rank	Penalties	Total	Rank	Penalties	Rank	Penalties	Time	Rank
Martina Campi	Darina	Individual Jumping	0	1	0	0	1	0	=1	0	39.95	2nd place, silver medalist(s)
'South America'; Martina Campi (ARG); Bianca de Souza Rodrigues (BRA); Antoine Porte (CHI); Valeria Jimenez Caballero (PAR); Francisco Calvelo Martinez (URU)	Darina; La Gomera; Zyralynn; Cenai; Lord Power	Team Jumping	4; ~~EL~~; ~~20~~; 0; 0	2	0; ~~20~~; ~~8~~; 0; 0	4	2	4	2nd place, silver medalist(s)	—N/a		

== Fencing ==
Argentina qualified one athlete based on its performance at the 2014 Cadet World Championships.

Boys

Athlete	Event	Pool Round	Seed	Round of 16	Quarterfinals	Semifinals	Final / BM	Rank
Athlete	Event	Opposition Score	Seed	Opposition Score	Opposition Score	Opposition Score	Opposition Score	Rank
Pietro Di Martino	Sabre	2–4	10	Yan (CHN); L 12–15	Did not advance			9

Mixed Team

Athletes	Event	Round of 16	Quarterfinals	Semifinals / PM	Final / PM	Rank
Athletes	Event	Opposition Score	Opposition Score	Opposition Score	Opposition Score	Rank
Americas 1 Justin Yoo (USA); Sabrina Massialas (USA); Pietro Jose di Martino (ARG); Catherine Nixon (USA); George Haglund (USA); Julieta Isabel Toledo Ames (MEX)	Mixed Team	Bye	Europe 2 L 24–30	Europe 4 L 27–30	Europe 3 L 28–30	8

== Field hockey ==
Argentina qualified a girls' team based on its performance at the 2014 Youth American Championship.

=== Girls' tournament ===
Roster

- Cristina Cosentino
- Bárbara Dichiara Gentili
- Julieta Jankunas
- Macarena Losada
- María Paula Ortiz
- Micaela Retegui
- Delfina Thome
- Sofía Toccalino
- Eugenia Trinchinetti

Group Stage

Pos	Team	Pld	W	D	L	GF	GA	GD	Pts	Qualification
1	Netherlands	4	4	0	0	46	1	+45	12	Quarterfinals
2	Japan	4	2	1	1	42	16	+26	7	Quarterfinals
3	Argentina	4	2	1	1	34	9	+25	7	Quarterfinals
4	South Africa	4	1	0	3	8	34	−26	3	Quarterfinals
5	Fiji	4	0	0	4	3	73	−70	0	

Source: FIH
Rules for classification: 1) points; 2) goal difference; 3) goals scored; 4) head-to-head result.

17 August 2014
16:30

Argentina	22 – 0	Fiji
Jankunas 1', 3', 15', 15', 27', 28', 31', 34'; Trinchinetti 6', 16', 17', 36'; Ortiz 7', 33'; Retegui 10', 21', 32'; Thome 19', 23', 30'; Toccalino 26', 35'	Report

Umpires:
Ivona Makar (CRO)
Tanja Schafer (RSA)

18 August 2014
19:00

Argentina	9 – 0	South Africa
Jankunas 3', 22'; Toccalino 4', 27'; Thome 8', 15'; Trinchinetti 20'; Retegui 24', 26'	Report

Umpires:
Ana Faias (POR)
Lucy Townend (NZL)

20 August 2014
16:00

Argentina	0 – 6	Netherlands
	Report	Veen 12', 26' van Erk 16'; Fillet 28'; Wijsman 30'; Matla 32'

Umpires:
Denise Pelletier (CAN)
Tanja Schafer (RSA)

21 August 2014
21:00

Japan	3 – 3	Argentina
Tsubouchi 7'; Asai 17', 36'	Report	Jankunas 2'; Retegui 21', 27'

Quarterfinal

23 August 2014
16:30

Uruguay	0 – 9	Argentina
	Report	Ortiz 2'; Jankunas 3', 28', 34'; Thome 6'; Dichiara 8'; Toccalino 29'; Trinchinetti 31', 33'

Umpires:
Ivona Makara (CRO)
Ana Escalante (MEX)

Semifinal

24 August 2014
18:00

Netherlands	4 – 2	Argentina
Kerstholt 20', 35'; Van Erk 22'; Veen 34'	Report	Jankunas 11', 31'

Umpires:
Tanja Schafer (RSA)
Ivona Makar (CRO)

Bronze medal match

26 August 2014
19:00

Argentina (bronze)	5 – 2	Japan
Ortiz 13'; Guastavino 17'; Jankunas 20', 25', 35'	Report	Fujibayashi 27'; Mori 32'

Umpires:
Denise Pelletier (CAN)
Ivona Makar (CRO)

== Golf ==
Argentina qualified one athlete based on the 8 June 2014 IGF World Amateur Golf Rankings.

Individual

Athlete	Event	Round 1		Round 2			Round 3			Total	
Athlete	Event	Score	Rank	Score	Total	Rank	Score	Total	Rank	Score	Rank
Sofía Goicoechea Ruíz	Girls	75	19	78	153	26	79	232	24	232	26

Team

Athletes	Event	Round 1 (Fourball)		Round 2 (Foursome)		Round 3 (Individual Stroke)				Total	
Athletes	Event	Score	Rank	Score	Rank	Boy	Girl	Total	Rank	Score	Rank
Marcos Cabarcos (PAN); Sofía Goicoechea Ruíz (ARG)	Mixed									301	13

== Gymnastics ==
=== Artistic Gymnastics ===
Argentina qualified one athlete based on its performance at the 2014 Junior Pan American Artistic Gymnastics Championships.

Girls

Athlete	Event	Apparatus				Total	Rank
Athlete	Event	F	V	UB	BB	Total	Rank
Agustina Santamaria	Qualification	12.350	12.800	8.250	12.450	45.850	28

== Judo ==
Argentina qualified two athletes based on its performance at the 2013 Cadet World Judo Championships.

Individual

Athlete	Event	Round of 16	Quarterfinals	Semifinals	Rep 1	Rep 2	Rep 3	Final / BM	Rank
Athlete	Event	Opposition Result	Opposition Result	Opposition Result	Opposition Result	Opposition Result	Opposition Result	Opposition Result	Rank
Gustavo Basile	Boys' -100 kg	—N/a		Dashkov (KGZ); L 000-100	—N/a			Schonefeldt (GER); L 000–101	4
Ayelén Elizeche	Girls' -52 kg	Lee (KOR); W 002-0011	Stangar (SLO); L 000-100	Did not advance	—N/a	Minenkova (BLR); W 1002–0002	Lee (KOR); L 0003-0001	Did not advance	7

Team

Athletes	Event	Round of 16	Quarterfinals	Semifinals	Final	Rank
Athletes	Event	Opposition Result	Opposition Result	Opposition Result	Opposition Result	Rank
Team Douillet; Gustavo Basile (ARG); Marko Bubanja (AUT); Adonis Diaz (USA); Liudmyla Drozdova (UKR); Lee Hye-kyeong (KOR); Brigita Matic (CRO); Peter Miles (GBR)	Mixed Team	Team Yamashita (MIX); W 3^{200} – 3^{112}	Team Nevzorov (MIX); W 5 – 2	Team Geesink (MIX); L 3^{111} – 3^{202}	Did not advance	3rd place, bronze medalist(s)
Team Rouge; Morgane Duchene (FRA); Ayelén Elizeche (ARG); Adrian Gandia (PUR); Mikhail Igolnikov (RUS); Lisa Millenberg (NED); Maria Siderot (POR); Sukhrob Tursunov (UZB)	Mixed Team	Team Kano (MIX); W 5-2	Team Ruska (MIX); W 5-2	Team Xian (MIX); W 4-3	Team Geesink (MIX); W 4-2	1st place, gold medalist(s)

== Modern Pentathlon ==
Argentina qualified one athlete based on the 1 June 2014 Olympic Youth A Pentathlon World Rankings.

Athlete	Event	Fencing Ranking Round (épée one touch)		Swimming (200 m freestyle)			Fencing Final Round (épée one touch)		Combined: Shooting/Running (10 m air pistol)/(3000 m)			Total Points	Final Rank
Athlete	Event	Results	Rank	Time	Rank	Points	Rank	Points	Time	Rank	Points	Total Points	Final Rank
Ailén Cisneros	Girls' Individual	14–9	6	2:27.37	19	258	7	275	16:15.20	23	325	858	22
Ailén Cisneros (ARG); Dovidas Vaivada (LTU)	Mixed Relay				17	327	6	285		509	22	1121	19

== Rowing ==
Argentina qualified two boats based on its performance at the 2014 Latin American Qualification Regatta.

Athlete	Event	Heats		Repechage		Semifinals		Final	
Athlete	Event	Time	Rank	Time	Rank	Time	Rank	Time	Rank
Joel Rabel	Boys' Single Sculls	3:34.83	4 R	3:24.84	2 SA/B	3:31.38	6 FB	3:40.58	12
Ilen Carballo	Girls' Single Sculls	4:01.33	6 R	4:06.26	5 SC/D	4:02.68	3 FC	4:15.15	18

== Rugby sevens ==
Argentina qualified 1 team in the boys' team competition based on their ranking at the 2013 Rugby Sevens World Cup.

=== Boys' tournament ===
Roster

- José Barros Sosa
- Lautaro Bazán Vélez
- Vicente Boronat
- Enrique Camerlinckx
- Juan Cruz Camerlinckx
- Juan Ignacio Conil Vila
- Manuel de Sousa Carrusca
- Bautista Delguy
- Indalecio Ledesma
- Hugo Miotti
- Mariano Romanini
- Isaac Sprenger

Group Stage

Pos	Team	Pld	W	D	L	PF	PA	PD	Pts
1	Argentina	5	5	0	0	145	34	+111	15
2	France	5	4	0	1	98	55	+43	13
3	Fiji	5	2	0	3	82	70	+12	9
4	Kenya	5	2	0	3	68	107	−39	9
5	Japan	5	2	0	3	73	131	−58	9
6	United States	5	0	0	5	59	128	−69	5

17 August 2014
11:30

Argentina	19 – 7	France
	Report

Youth Olympic Sports Park

17 August 2014
18:30

Argentina	40 – 12	Japan
	Report

Youth Olympic Sports Park

18 August 2014
11:00

Kenya	5 – 32	Argentina
	Report

Youth Olympic Sports Park

18 August 2014
18:30

Fiji	0 – 21	Argentina
	Report

Youth Olympic Sports Park

19 August 2014
11:00

Argentina	33 – 10	United States
	Report

Youth Olympic Sports Park

Semifinal

19 August 2014
18:00

Argentina	19 – 12	Kenya
	Report

Youth Olympic Sports Park

Gold Medal Match

20 August 2014
10:30

Argentina (silver)	22 – 45	France
	Report

Youth Olympic Sports Park

== Sailing ==
Argentina qualified two boats based on its performance at the Techno 293 Central & South American Continental Qualifiers.

Athlete	Event	Race											Net Points	Final Rank
Athlete	Event	1	2	3	4	5	6	7	8	9	10	M*	Net Points	Final Rank
Francisco Saubidet	Boys' Techno 293	6	1	1	8	1	11	CAN				2	19	1st place, gold medalist(s)
Micaela Lauret	Girls' Techno 293	15	19	15	19	19	19	CAN				17	104	19

== Shooting ==
Argentina qualified two shooters based on its performance at the Americas Qualification Event held during a Shooting World Cup event in Fort Benning.

Lucas Decicilia finished 1st in Men's 10m Air Rifle event, thus winning one quota for Argentina. Fernanda Russo while ending 4th at the Girls 10m Air Rifle event still gained the quota because Mexico had already occupied it's quotas by finishing 1st, 2nd and 3rd in the Girl's Air Rifle Event (the requirement to get a quota was to end 1st or 2nd in a MQA event).

Individual

Athlete	Event	Qualification		Final	
Athlete	Event	Points	Rank	Points	Rank
Lucas Decicilia	Boys' 10m Air Rifle	599.0	18	Did not advance	
Fernanda Russo	Girls' 10m Air Rifle	406.9	13	Did not advance	

Team

Athletes	Event	Qualification		Round of 16	Quarterfinals	Semifinals	Final / BM	Rank
Athletes	Event	Points	Rank	Opposition Result	Opposition Result	Opposition Result	Opposition Result	Rank
Lucas Deciclia (ARG); Julia Budde (GER)	Mixed Team 10m Air Rifle	815.5	9 Q	Tahlak (UAE); Suppini (ITA); W 10–4	Russo (ARG); Valdes Martinez (MEX); L 7–10	Did not advance		5
Fernanda Russo (ARG); José Santos Valdés Martinez (MEX)	Mixed Team 10m Air Rifle	825.2	1 Q	Pei (CHN); Aksoy (TUR); W 10–5	Budde (GER); Deciclia (ARG); W 10 - 7	Sukhorukova (UKR); Lu (TPE); W 10 - 8	Mekhimar (EGY); Péni (HUN); L 2 - 10	2nd place, silver medalist(s)

== Swimming ==
Argentina qualified three swimmers.

Boys

Athlete	Event	Heat		Semifinal		Final	
Athlete	Event	Time	Rank	Time	Rank	Time	Rank
Guido Buscaglia	50 m freestyle	23.69	19	Did not advance			
Guido Buscaglia	100 m freestyle	51.48	17	Did not advance			
Guido Buscaglia	200 m freestyle	1:53.20	20	—N/a		Did not advance	
Guido Buscaglia	50 m butterfly	25.18	21	Did not advance			
Santiago Grassi	50 m butterfly	24.93	12 Q	24.71	10	Did not advance	
Santiago Grassi	100 m butterfly	54.40	7Q	54.37	9	Did not advance	
Santiago Grassi	200 m butterfly	2:07.17	20	—N/a		Did not advance	

Girls

Athlete	Event	Heat		Final	
Athlete	Event	Time	Rank	Time	Rank
Josefina Lorda Taylor	200 m butterfly	2:18.90	20	Did not advance	

== Table Tennis ==
Argentina qualified one athlete based on its performance at the Latin American Qualification Event.

Singles

Athlete	Event	Group Stage	Rank	Round of 16	Quarterfinals	Semifinals	Final / BM	Rank
Athlete	Event	Opposition Score	Rank	Opposition Score	Opposition Score	Opposition Score	Opposition Score	Rank
Fermín Tenti	Boys	Group C Calderano (BRA); L 12–10, 10–12, 12–14, 6–11	2 Q	Hung (HKG); L 11–9, 6–11, 8–11, 7–11, 7–11	Did not advance			9
Fermín Tenti	Boys	Huang (AUS); W 11–8, 11–2, 11–7	2 Q	Hung (HKG); L 11–9, 6–11, 8–11, 7–11, 7–11	Did not advance			9
Fermín Tenti	Boys	Ranefur (SWE); W 10–12, 11–7, 9–11, 11–3, 11–8	2 Q	Hung (HKG); L 11–9, 6–11, 8–11, 7–11, 7–11	Did not advance			9

Team

Athletes	Event	Group Stage	Rank	Round of 16	Quarterfinals	Semifinals	Final / BM	Rank
Athletes	Event	Opposition Score	Rank	Opposition Score	Opposition Score	Opposition Score	Opposition Score	Rank
Latin America 2 Fermín Tenti (ARG); Gremlis Arvelo (VEN)	Mixed	China; Liu (CHN); Fan (CHN)	3 qB	Latin America 3 Edghill (GUY); Toranzos (PAR); W 2-1	Europe 3 Schmid (SUI); Piccolin (ITA); W 2–1	—N/a		17
Latin America 2 Fermín Tenti (ARG); Gremlis Arvelo (VEN)	Mixed	Poland; Zatówka (POL); Bajor (POL)	3 qB	Latin America 3 Edghill (GUY); Toranzos (PAR); W 2-1	Europe 3 Schmid (SUI); Piccolin (ITA); W 2–1	—N/a		17
Latin America 2 Fermín Tenti (ARG); Gremlis Arvelo (VEN)	Mixed	Asia 1 Kim (UZB); Al-Naggar (QAT)	3 qB	Latin America 3 Edghill (GUY); Toranzos (PAR); W 2-1	Europe 3 Schmid (SUI); Piccolin (ITA); W 2–1	—N/a		17

Qualification Legend: Q=Main Bracket (medal); qB=Consolation Bracket (non-medal)

== Taekwondo ==
Argentina qualified one athlete based on its performance at the Taekwondo Qualification Tournament.

Boys

Athlete	Event	Round of 16	Quarterfinals	Semifinals	Final	Rank
Athlete	Event	Opposition Result	Opposition Result	Opposition Result	Opposition Result	Rank
Ezequiel Navarro	−48 kg	Bye	Chiovetta (GER); L 4–16	Did not advance		5

== Tennis ==
Argentina qualified two tennis players based on their ranking.

Singles

Athlete	Event	Round of 32	Round of 16	Quarterfinals	Semifinals	Final / BM	Rank
Athlete	Event	Opposition Score	Opposition Score	Opposition Score	Opposition Score	Opposition Score	Rank
Francisco Bahamonde	Boys' Singles	Appelgren (SWE); W 7–5, 2–6, 7–6	Matsumura (JPN); W 6–4, 6–1	Rublev (RUS); L w/o	Did not advance		5
Matías Zukas	Boys' Singles	Chung (KOR); L 1–6, 5–7	Did not advance				17

Doubles

Athletes	Event	Round of 32	Round of 16	Quarterfinals	Semifinals	Final / BM	Rank
Athletes	Event	Opposition Score	Opposition Score	Opposition Score	Opposition Score	Opposition Score	Rank
Francisco Bahamonde (ARG); Matías Zukas (ARG)	Boys' Doubles	—N/a	Rybakov (USA); Valero (COL); W 7–6, 6–3	Matsumura (JPN); Yamasaki (JPN); L w/o	Did not advance		5
Ioana Loredana Roșca (ROU); Francisco Bahamonde (ARG)	Mixed Doubles	Bondár (HUN); Biró (HUN); W 2-0; 7^{7}-6^{4}, 6-3	Ducu (ROU); Zukas (ARG); L w/o	Did not advance			17
Ioana Ducu (ROU); Matías Zukas (ARG)	Mixed Doubles	Jacobs (NAM); Iradukunda (BDI); W 2-0; 6–3, 6-1	Roșca (ROU); Bahamonde (ARG); W w/o	Komardina (RUS); Khachanov (RUS); W 2-0; 7^{7}-6^{2}, 6-4	Teichmann (SUI); Zieliński (POL); L 0-2; 2–6, 1-6	Stollár (HUN); Majchrzak (POL); L 1-2; 3–6, 6–3, [5]-[10]	4

== Weightlifting ==
Argentina was given a reallocation spot for being a top ranked nation not yet qualified.

Girls

Athlete	Event	Snatch		Clean & jerk		Total	Rank
Athlete	Event	Result	Rank	Result	Rank	Total	Rank
Sasha Nievas	−58 kg	78	4	100	3	178	3rd place, bronze medalist(s)

== Wrestling ==
Argentina qualified one athlete based on its performance at the 2014 Pan American Cadet Championships.

Key:
- VT - Victory by Fall.
- PP - Decision by Points - the loser with technical points.
- PO - Decision by Points - the loser without technical points.

Boys

Athlete	Event	Group stage				Final / RM	Rank
Athlete	Event	Opposition Score	Opposition Score	Opposition Score	Rank	Opposition Score	Rank
Agustín Destribats	Greco-Roman -58kg	Nasr (TUN); W 4-0 ^{ST}	Mikaelyan (ARM); L 0-4 ^{ST}	de Los Santos (DOM); W 4-0 ^{VT}	2 Q	Abdevali (IRI); L 2-4 ^{PP}	4
