= Swimming at the 2014 Summer Youth Olympics – Boys' 100 metre butterfly =

Boys' 100 metre butterfly at the 2014 Summer Youth Olympics
- Venue: Nanjing Olympic Sports Centre
- Dates: 18 August (heats, semifinals); 19 August (final)
- Competitors: 25 from 25 nations
- Winning time: 52.94

Medalists
gold medal	Li Zhuhao	China
silver medal	Aleksandr Sadovnikov	Russia
bronze medal	Nicholas Brown	Australia

The boys' 100 metre butterfly event in swimming at the 2014 Summer Youth Olympics took place on 18 and 19 August at the Nanjing Olympic Sports Centre in Nanjing, China.

== Results ==
=== Heats ===
The heats were held at 10:22.

Rank	Heat	Lane	Name	Nationality	Time	Notes
1	4	4	Li Zhuhao	China	52.97	Q
2	2	7	Aleksandr Sadovnikov	Russia	53.64	Q
3	2	4	Joshua Steyn	South Africa	53.74	Q
4	3	5	Nicholas Brown	Australia	54.04	Q
5	2	3	Nils Liess	Switzerland	54.15	Q
6	4	2	Mathys Goosen	Netherlands	54.34	Q
7	4	3	Santiago Grassi	Argentina	54.40	Q
8	2	5	Alexander Kunert	Germany	54.84	Q
9	3	4	Sascha Subarsky	Austria	54.86	Q
10	3	3	Giacomo Carini	Italy	55.01	Q
11	2	6	Zuhayr Pigot	Suriname	55.19	Q
12	4	6	Tamás Kenderesi	Hungary	55.20	Q
13	3	6	Supakrid Pananuratana	Thailand	55.21	Q
14	4	7	Justin Wright	United States	55.47	Q
15	2	2	Daniel Zaitsev	Estonia	55.55	Q
16	3	2	Luke Greenbank	Great Britain	55.59	Q
17	3	7	Tomáš Púchly	Slovakia	56.11	
18	4	8	Ralph Goveia	Zambia	56.16	
19	3	1	Supriya Mondal	India	56.23	
20	2	1	Dylan Koo	Singapore	56.24	
21	4	5	Jonathan Gómez	Colombia	56.53	
22	4	1	Sidrell Williams	Jamaica	57.40	
23	1	3	Jesse Washington	Bermuda	59.03	
24	1	4	Lalanomena Andrianirina	Madagascar	1:03.26	
25	1	5	Haris Bandey	Pakistan	1:05.03	

=== Semifinals ===
The semifinals were held at 18:32.

Rank	Heat	Lane	Name	Nationality	Time	Notes
1	2	4	Li Zhuhao	China	53.26	Q
2	1	4	Aleksandr Sadovnikov	Russia	53.42	Q
3	2	3	Nils Liess	Switzerland	53.52	Q
4	1	5	Nicholas Brown	Australia	53.57	Q
5	1	3	Mathys Goosen	Netherlands	53.84	Q
6	1	7	Tamás Kenderesi	Hungary	53.94	Q
7	2	2	Sascha Subarsky	Austria	54.00	Q
8	2	5	Joshua Steyn	South Africa	54.25	Q
9	2	6	Santiago Grassi	Argentina	54.37	
10	1	6	Alexander Kunert	Germany	54.59	
11	1	2	Giacomo Carini	Italy	54.69	
12	1	1	Justin Wright	United States	54.88	
13	2	1	Supakrid Pananuratana	Thailand	54.91	
14	2	7	Zuhayr Pigot	Suriname	55.09	
15	2	8	Daniel Zaitsev	Estonia	55.39	
16	1	8	Luke Greenbank	Great Britain	56.74	

=== Final ===
The final was held at 18:41.

Rank	Lane	Name	Nationality	Time	Notes
1st place, gold medalist(s)	4	Li Zhuhao	China	52.94	
2nd place, silver medalist(s)	5	Aleksandr Sadovnikov	Russia	52.97	
3rd place, bronze medalist(s)	6	Nicholas Brown	Australia	53.18	
4	8	Joshua Steyn	South Africa	53.63	
5	2	Mathys Goosen	Netherlands	53.64	
6	3	Nils Liess	Switzerland	54.14	
7	7	Tamás Kenderesi	Hungary	54.30	
8	1	Sascha Subarsky	Austria	54.44	
