= Sailing at the 2014 Summer Youth Olympics =

Sailing at the II Summer Youth Olympic Games
- Venue: Jinniu Lake
- Dates: 18–23 August
- No. of events: 4 (2 boys, 2 girls)

Sailing at the 2014 Summer Youth Olympics was held from 18 to 23 August at Jinniu Lake in Nanjing, China.

== Qualification ==
Each National Olympic Committee (NOC) could enter a maximum of 4 boats, 1 per event. As hosts, China was given the maximum quota of 4, but since they did not compete in any of the qualification events, the spots were reallocated. An extra additional spot was created in the girls' Techno 293 event and given to China. A further 8, 2 in each event, was decided by the Tripartite Commission. The remaining 88 places were allocated based on qualification events, namely the 2013 World Championships and six continental qualification tournaments for each boat. If a country declined a spot or if there were spots that remained unfilled after the qualification event, the quota was reallocated to another nation, with priority going to nations that had not qualified for any sailing events.

To be eligible to participate at the Youth Olympics athletes must have been born between 1 January 1998 and 31 December 1999.

=== Byte CII ===
Event	Location	Date	Total Places	Qualified Boys	Qualified Girls
Host Nation	-	-	1	Antigua and Barbuda^{[a]}	Chile^{[a]}
2013 World Championships	(United States) Newport	24–28 August 2013	5	Canada; Croatia; Hungary; Singapore; United States	Bermuda; Dominican Republic; Hungary; Netherlands; Singapore
Asian Continental Qualification	(Malaysia) Langkawi	9–14 February 2014	4	Indonesia; Malaysia; Thailand; United Arab Emirates	Indonesia; Malaysia; Thailand; Algeria^{[a]}
N American & Caribbean Continental Qualification	(United States) Florida	27 Feb–2 Mar 2014	4	Bahamas; British Virgin Islands; Cayman Islands; Virgin Islands	Cayman Islands; Mexico; Trinidad and Tobago; Virgin Islands
Central & S American Continental Qualification	(Brazil) São Paulo	1–4 March 2014	3	Brazil; Chile; Peru	Brazil; Peru; Uruguay
Oceania Continental Qualification	(Australia) Brisbane	17–21 April 2014	3	Australia; Cook Islands; New Zealand	Australia; Bulgaria^{[a]} Croatia^{[a]}
African Continental Qualification	(Italy) Riva del Garda	21–27 April 2014	2	Algeria; South Africa	Egypt; South Africa
European Continental Qualification	(Italy) Riva del Garda	21–27 April 2014	6	France; Greece; Italy; Netherlands; Portugal; Sweden	France; Great Britain; Italy; Norway; Portugal; Ukraine
Tripartite Invitation	-	-	2	Saint Lucia; Papua New Guinea^{[a]}	Ecuador^{[a]} Finland^{[a]}
TOTAL				30	30

- ^{a} Reallocation spot

=== Techno 293 ===
Event	Location	Date	Total Places	Qualified Boys	Qualified Girls
Host Nation	-	-	1	Chinese Taipei^{[b]}	India^{[b]}
2013 World Championships	(Poland) Sopot	24–28 August 2013	3	Hong Kong; Israel; Slovenia^{[b]}	France; Hong Kong; Russia
African Continental Qualification	(Tunisia) Port Yasmine	2–7 September 2013	1	Tunisia	Venezuela^{[b]}
Asian Continental Qualification	Singapore	22–26 January 2014	3	Japan; Myanmar; Thailand	Japan; Singapore; Thailand
Oceania Continental Qualification	(New Zealand) Auckland	14–16 February 2014	2	New Zealand; Slovakia^{[b]}	New Zealand; Estonia^{[b]}
N American & Caribbean Continental Qualification	(Mexico) Cancún	20–23 February 2014	2	United States; Aruba	Mexico; Latvia^{[b]}
Central & S American Continental Qualification	(Argentina) Mendoza	25–29 March 2014	2	Argentina; Brazil	Peru; Argentina
European Continental Qualification	(Italy) Torbole sul Garda	20–27 April 2014	4	France; Italy; Netherlands; Russia	Israel; Italy; Netherlands; Spain
Tripartite Invitation	-	-	2	Puerto Rico^{[b]} Venezuela^{[b]}	Poland^{[b]} Turkey^{[b]}
Additional Quota Place	-	-	1	—N/a	China
TOTAL				20	21

- ^{b} Reallocation spot

== Schedule ==
The schedule was released by the Nanjing Youth Olympic Games Organizing Committee.

All times are CST (UTC+8)

Event date	Event day	Starting time	Event details
August 18	Monday	11:00	Boys' Byte CII Qualification Races; Girls' Byte CII Qualification Races; Boys' Techno 293 Qualification Races; Girls' Techno 293 Qualification Races
August 19	Tuesday	11:00	Boys' Byte CII Qualification Races; Girls' Byte CII Qualification Races; Boys' Techno 293 Qualification Races; Girls' Techno 293 Qualification Races
August 20	Wednesday	11:00	Boys' Byte CII Qualification Races; Girls' Byte CII Qualification Races; Boys' Techno 293 Qualification Races; Girls' Techno 293 Qualification Races
August 21	Thursday	-	Reserve Day (if required)
August 22	Friday	11:00	Boys' Byte CII Qualification Races; Girls' Byte CII Qualification Races; Boys' Techno 293 Qualification Races; Girls' Techno 293 Qualification Races
August 23	Saturday	11:00	Boys' Byte CII Medal Race; Girls' Byte CII Medal Race; Boys' Techno 293 Medal Race; Girls' Techno 293 Medal Race
August 24	Sunday	-	Reserve Day (if required)

== Medal summary ==
=== Medal table ===
* Host nation (China)

Rank	Nation	Gold	Silver	Bronze	Total
1	Singapore	2	0	0	2
2	Argentina	1	0	0	1
2	China*	1	0	0	1
4	Russia	0	2	0	2
5	Netherlands	0	1	1	2
6	Portugal	0	1	0	1
7	France	0	0	1	1
7	Hungary	0	0	1	1
7	Peru	0	0	1	1
Totals (9 entries)		4	4	4	12

=== Boys ===
Event	Gold	Silver	Bronze
One Person Dinghy (Byte CII)	Bernie Chin; Singapore	Rodolfo Pires; Portugal	Jonatán Vadnai; Hungary
Windsurfing (Techno 293)	Francisco Saubidet; Argentina	Maxim Tokarev; Russia	Lars van Someren; Netherlands

=== Girls ===
Event	Gold	Silver	Bronze
One Person Dinghy (Byte CII)	Samantha Yom; Singapore	Odile van Aanholt; Netherlands	Jarian Brandes; Peru
Windsurfing (Techno 293)	Wu Linli; China	Mariam Sekhposyan; Russia	Lucie Pianazza; France
