= Equestrian at the 2014 Summer Youth Olympics =

Equestrian at the II Summer Youth Olympic Games
- Venue: Nanjing International Exhibition Center
- Dates: 19–24 August

Equestrian at the 2014 Summer Youth Olympics was held from 19 to 24 August at the Nanjing International Exhibition Center in Nanjing, China.

== Qualification ==
Each National Olympic Committee (NOC) can enter a maximum of 1 athlete. Athletes qualified into one of six zones (Europe, North America, South America, Asia, Australasia and Africa) containing five athletes. As hosts, China was automatically given a rider and up to 6 spots were available to the Tripartite Commission, though not all were used; this will cause a reduction from the zone quota depending which zone the chosen athlete is from. The remaining places were decided from qualification events or the 2013 FEI World Jumping Challenge (Category A) rankings. Should a zone not have enough athletes, the spot was filled by athletes from another zone.

To be eligible to participate at the Youth Olympics athletes must have been born between 1 January 1996 and 31 December 1997. Furthermore, all riders must have obtained a Certificate of Capability. The certificate must be obtained between 1 April 2013 and 31 May 2014 at a registered event.

== Participating nations ==
=== Europe ===
- Great Britain
- Ireland
- Italy
- Netherlands
- Sweden

=== North America ===
- Cayman Islands
- Dominican Republic
- Ecuador*
- El Salvador
- Guatemala

=== South America ===
- Argentina
- Brazil
- Chile
- Paraguay
- Uruguay

=== Asia ===
- China
- Japan
- Kyrgyzstan
- Qatar
- Saudi Arabia

=== Australasia ===
- Australia
- Hong Kong
- Iran
- Malaysia
- New Zealand

=== Africa ===
- Egypt
- Morocco
- Senegal
- South Africa
- Zimbabwe

== Schedule ==
The schedule was released by the Nanjing Youth Olympic Games Organizing Committee.

All times are CST (UTC+8)

Event date	Event day	Starting time	Event details
August 19	Tuesday	15:30	Team Jumping Round 1
August 20	Wednesday	15:30	Team Jumping Round 2
August 23	Saturday	15:30	Individual Jumping Round A
August 24	Sunday	15:30	Individual Jumping Round B

== Medal summary ==
=== Medal table ===
Rank	Nation	Gold	Silver	Bronze	Total
1	Mixed-NOCs	1	1	1	3
2	New Zealand	1	0	0	1
3	Argentina	0	1	0	1
3	Brazil	0	1	0	1
5	Australia	0	0	1	1
Totals (5 entries)		2	3	2	7

=== Events ===
Event	Gold	Silver	Bronze
Individual Jumping	Emily Fraser; New Zealand	Martina Campi; Argentina	Jake Hunter; Australia
Team Jumping	Europe; Matias Alvaro; Italy; Michael Duffy; Ireland; Jake Saywell; Great Britain; Filip Agren; Sweden; Lisa Nooren; Netherlands	South America; Francisco Calvelo Martinez; Uruguay; Antoine Porte; Chile; Valeria Jimenez Caballero; Paraguay; Martina Campi; Argentina; Bianca de Souza Rodrigues; Brazil	North America; Polly Serpell; Cayman Islands; Macarena Chiriboga Granja; Ecuador; Sabrina Rivera Meza; El Salvador; Stefanie Brand; Guatemala; María Gabriela Brugal; Dominican Republic
