= Swimming at the 2014 Summer Youth Olympics – Boys' 50 metre butterfly =

Boys' 50 metre butterfly at the 2014 Summer Youth Olympics
- Venue: Nanjing Olympic Sports Centre
- Dates: 20 August (heats, semifinals); 21 August (final)
- Competitors: 45 from 39 nations
- Winning time: 23.69

Medalists
gold medal	Yu Hexin	China
silver medal	Dylan Carter	Trinidad and Tobago
bronze medal	Mathys Goosen	Netherlands

The boys' 50 metre butterfly event in swimming at the 2014 Summer Youth Olympics took place on 20 and 21 August at the Nanjing Olympic Sports Centre in Nanjing, China.

== Results ==
=== Heats ===
The heats were held at 10:09.

Rank	Heat	Lane	Name	Nationality	Time	Notes
1	6	4	Dylan Carter	Trinidad and Tobago	24.01	Q
2	4	5	Yu Hexin	China	24.38	Q
3	5	5	Li Zhuhao	China	24.39	Q
4	4	3	Aleksandr Sadovnikov	Russia	24.49	Q
5	5	6	Daniel Zaitsev	Estonia	24.61	Q
6	6	3	Jānis Šaltāns	Latvia	24.68	Q
7	4	4	Mathys Goosen	Netherlands	24.69	Q
8	5	7	Povilas Strazdas	Lithuania	24.74	Q
9	4	2	Armin Porobic	Norway	24.86	Q
10	4	8	Joshua Steyn	South Africa	24.87	Q
11	5	4	Kyle Chalmers	Australia	24.90	Q
12	5	3	Santiago Grassi	Argentina	24.93	Q
13	6	5	Sascha Subarsky	Austria	24.95	Q
14	6	6	Filipp Shopin	Russia	25.00	Q
15	6	7	Chad Idensohn	Zimbabwe	25.02	Q
16	4	1	Norbert Szabó	Hungary	25.07	Q
17	5	2	Zuhayr Pigot	Suriname	25.08	
18	4	6	Alexander Kunert	Germany	25.10	
19	5	1	Supakrid Pananuratana	Thailand	25.16	
20	6	1	Franco Reyes	Panama	25.17	
21	3	3	Guido Buscaglia	Argentina	25.18	
22	3	5	Ralph Goveia	Zambia	25.33	
23	6	8	Adam Vik	Finland	25.34	
24	5	8	Vedad Ramić	Bosnia and Herzegovina	25.36	
25	3	6	Nicholas Brown	Australia	25.44	
26	1	2	Berk Özkul	Turkey	25.52	
27	3	1	Calum Bain	Ireland	25.69	
28	3	8	Giacomo Carini	Italy	25.74	
29	4	7	Bedirhan Yıldız	Turkey	25.85	
30	6	2	Tamás Kenderesi	Hungary	25.92	
31	2	5	Meli Malani	Fiji	26.02	
32	2	6	Oumar Toure	Mali	26.05	
33	3	2	José Alberto Quintanilla	Bolivia	26.17	
34	2	4	Dylan Koo	Singapore	26.22	
35	3	7	Sidrell Williams	Jamaica	26.29	
36	2	3	Vahan Mkhitaryan	Armenia	26.40	
37	3	4	Ali Al-Kaabi	United Arab Emirates	26.61	
38	2	2	Waleed Abdulrazzaq	Kuwait	26.62	
39	2	7	Adam Viktora	Seychelles	26.76	
40	2	1	Shakil Fakir	Mozambique	26.84	
41	2	8	Kwaku Addo	Ghana	27.45	
42	1	5	Hannibal Gaskin	Guyana	28.11	
43	1	6	Ammaar Ghadiyali	Tanzania	28.41	
44	1	4	Mohamed Adnan	Maldives	28.57	
45	1	3	Abdoul Babu	Rwanda	34.44	

=== Semifinals ===
The semifinals were held at 18:50.

Rank	Heat	Lane	Name	Nationality	Time	Notes
1	1	4	Yu Hexin	China	24.03	Q
2	2	4	Dylan Carter	Trinidad and Tobago	24.04	Q
3	1	5	Aleksandr Sadovnikov	Russia	24.09	Q
4	2	6	Mathys Goosen	Netherlands	24.29	Q
5	2	3	Daniel Zaitsev	Estonia	24.39	Q
6	2	5	Li Zhuhao	China	24.41	Q
7	1	3	Jānis Šaltāns	Latvia	24.58	Q
8	2	2	Armin Porobic	Norway	24.60	Q
9	2	7	Kyle Chalmers	Australia	24.70	
10	1	7	Santiago Grassi	Argentina	24.71	
11	1	2	Joshua Steyn	South Africa	24.74	
12	1	1	Filipp Shopin	Russia	24.82	
13	1	6	Povilas Strazdas	Lithuania	24.83	
14	1	8	Norbert Szabó	Hungary	24.93	
15	2	1	Sascha Subarsky	Austria	25.10	
15	2	8	Chad Idensohn	Zimbabwe	25.10	

=== Final ===
The final was held at 18:42.

Rank	Lane	Name	Nationality	Time	Notes
1st place, gold medalist(s)	4	Yu Hexin	China	23.69	
2nd place, silver medalist(s)	5	Dylan Carter	Trinidad and Tobago	23.81	
3rd place, bronze medalist(s)	6	Mathys Goosen	Netherlands	24.13	
4	3	Aleksandr Sadovnikov	Russia	24.16	
5	8	Armin Porobic	Norway	24.25	
6	7	Li Zhuhao	China	24.34	
7	2	Daniel Zaitsev	Estonia	24.57	
8	1	Jānis Šaltāns	Latvia	24.66	
