= CPHS =

CPHS may refer to:

- Cayman Prep and High School in Grand Cayman, Cayman Islands
- Cedar Park High School in Cedar Park, Texas
- Caldwell Parish High School in Columbia, LA
- Clover Park High School in Lakewood, Washington
- Crown Point High School in Crown Point, Indiana
- Boston University Center for Philosophy and History of Science
- College Park High School (Pleasant Hill, California)
- Castle Park High School
