= Weightlifting at the 2014 Summer Youth Olympics – Girls' 58 kg =

Girl's 58 kg at the II Summer Youth Olympic Games
- Venue: Nanjing International Expo Center
- Dates: August 19, 2014
- Competitors: 10 from 10 nations
- Winning total weight: 203kg

Medalists
1st place, gold medalist(s)		Chiang Nien-hsin	Chinese Taipei
2nd place, silver medalist(s)		Anastasia Petrova	Russia
3rd place, bronze medalist(s)		Sasha Nievas	Argentina

The girls' 58 kg weightlifting event was the third women's event at the weightlifting competition at the 2014 Summer Youth Olympics, with competitors limited to a maximum of 58 kilograms of body mass.

Each lifter performed in both the snatch and clean and jerk lifts, with the final score being the sum of the lifter's best result in each. The athlete received three attempts in each of the two lifts; the score for the lift was the heaviest weight successfully lifted.

== Results ==
Rank	Name	Body Weight	Snatch (kg)				Clean & Jerk (kg)				Total (kg)
Rank	Name	Body Weight	1	2	3	Res	1	2	3	Res	Total (kg)
1st place, gold medalist(s)	Chiang Nien-hsin (TPE)	57.61	80	85	88	88	107	111	115	115	203
2nd place, silver medalist(s)	Anastasia Petrova (RUS)	57.60	80	85	~~90~~	85	100	105	110	110	195
3rd place, bronze medalist(s)	Sasha Nievas (ARG)	57.02	~~75~~	75	78	78	95	100	~~102~~	100	178
4	Acchedya Jagaddhita (INA)	57.41	73	76	79	79	92	~~96~~	~~97~~	92	171
5	Altynay Damen (KAZ)	57.05	68	~~73~~	~~73~~	68	85	90	93	93	161
6	Sagolsem Thasana Chanu (IND)	57.91	~~70~~	70	~~74~~	70	~~85~~	85	90	90	160
7	Maryem Benmiloud (ALG)	57.67	57	63	66	66	78	82	~~83~~	82	148
8	Youssra Karim (MAR)	56.23	50	54	56	56	70	74	~~77~~	74	130
9	Romentha Larue (SEY)	57.43	~~53~~	53	55	55	65	~~70~~	~~70~~	65	120
	Vanya Luhova (BUL)	56.23	~~74~~	~~74~~	~~74~~	–	–	–	–	–	–
