= Morgan Lloyd (gymnast) =

Caymanian artistic gymnast

- Born: 7 June 1999 (age 27) Cayman Islands
- Height: 162 cm (5 ft 4 in)

Gymnastics career
- Discipline: Women's artistic gymnastics
- Country represented: Cayman Islands

Morgan Lloyd (born 7 June 1999) is a Caymanian former artistic gymnast. She represented the Cayman Islands at the 2014 Summer Youth Olympics and 2015 Pan American Games. She was the first gymnast to represent the Cayman Islands at international competitions, and in 2015, she became the first gymnast to compete for the Cayman Islands at the World Championships.

== Early life ==
Lloyd began gymnastics when she was 18 months old. She has two siblings, and her parents are immigrants from Canada. She attended Cayman Prep and High School before moving to Ashbury College in Canada for her last two years of secondary school.

== Career ==
=== 2013 ===
Lloyd competed at her first international event, the Island Games in Bermuda. She placed 22nd in the all-around. She was the first gymnast to represent the Cayman Islands at an international competition.

=== 2014 ===
In March, Lloyd competed at the Junior Pan American Championships in Aracaju, Brazil. She finished 34th with an all-around score of 39.334. Her placement qualified her to compete at the upcoming Summer Youth Olympics.

In August, at the Summer Youth Olympics, she placed 37th with an all-around score of 41.250.

In November, she and two other Caymanian gymnasts were invited to a pan-American training camp at the U.S. National Training Center in Huntsville, Texas.

=== 2015 ===
In March, she tore a muscle in her hip and was not able to train fully until mid-June.

In July, at the Pan American Games in Toronto, Lloyd placed 30th in the all-around qualifications with a score of 40.050. She advanced to the all-around final as a reserve. In the final, she scored 41.150 and placed 23rd overall.

She competed at the 2015 World Championships in Glasgow in October. It was the first time a gymnast representing the Cayman Islands competed at the World Championships. However, when she competed vault, her hand slipped on the apparatus. She received a zero on the event and ended up in 250th place in the all-around.

In November, she competed at the first Caribbean Gymnastics Championships, held in Jamaica, where she won gold on floor and two bronze medals on vault and the uneven bars.

=== 2017 ===
Lloyd was scheduled to compete at the 2017 Island Games; however, she did not start at the competition.
