= Russia at the 2014 Summer Youth Olympics =

- IOC code: RUS
- NOC: Russian Olympic Committee
- Website: olympic.ru

in Nanjing
- Competitors: 84 in 18 sports
- Flag bearers: Anatoliy Ryapolov (opening); Mikhail Igolnikov (closing)
- Medals Ranked 2nd: Gold 27 Silver 19 Bronze 11 Total 57

Summer Youth Olympics appearances (overview)
- 2010; 2014; 2018; 2026

Russia competed at the 2014 Summer Youth Olympics, in Nanjing, China from 16 August to 28 August 2014.

== Medalists ==
Medals awarded to participants of mixed-NOC teams are represented in italics. These medals are not counted towards the individual NOC medal tally.

Medal	Name	Sport	Event	Date

Medals by sport
Sport	1st place, gold medalist(s)	2nd place, silver medalist(s)	3rd place, bronze medalist(s)	Total
Gymnastics	7	2	2	11
Swimming	6	4	3	13
Wrestling	4	0	0	4
Athletics	3	2	0	5
Fencing	2	0	1	3
Weightlifting	1	3	0	4
Canoeing	1	0	1	2
Judo	1	0	1	2
Beach volleyball	1	0	0	1
Modern pentathlon	1	0	0	1
Tennis	0	2	1	3
Sailing	0	2	0	2
Boxing	0	1	1	2
Taekwondo	0	1	1	2
Handball	0	1	0	1
Shooting	0	1	0	1
Total	27	19	11	57

Medals by date
Day	Date	1st place, gold medalist(s)	2nd place, silver medalist(s)	3rd place, bronze medalist(s)	Total
Day 1	17 August				
Day 2	18 August				
Day 3	19 August				
Day 4	20 August				
Day 5	21 August				
Day 6	22 August				
Day 7	23 August				
Day 8	24 August				
Day 9	25 August				
Day 10	26 August				
Day 11	27 August				
Total		27	19	11	57

== Competitors ==
Sport	Boys	Girls	Total
Athletics	5	4	9
Basketball	4	0	4
Beach volleyball	2	2	4
Boxing	3	0	3
Canoeing	1	1	2
Fencing	2	2	4
Gymnastics	2	8	10
Handball	0	14	14
Judo	1	1	2
Modern pentathlon	1	1	2
Sailing	1	1	2
Shooting	0	2	2
Swimming	4	4	8
Taekwondo	1	2	3
Tennis	2	2	4
Triathlon	1	1	2
Weightlifting	2	2	4
Wrestling	4	1	5
Total	36	48	84

== Athletics ==
Russia used 9 of their 18 quotas based on its performance at the European Olympic Youth Trials.

=== Boys ===
Track and Road Events

Athletes	Event	Final	
Athletes	Event	Result	Rank
Vladislav Saraykin	Boys’ 10km Walk	42:10.95 PB	2nd place, silver medalist(s)

Field Events

Athletes	Event	Qualification		Final	
Athletes	Event	Result	Rank	Result	Rank
Petr Nekiporets	Boys’ Hammer Throw	74.47	6 Q	72.61	6
Danil Lysenko	Boys’ High Jump	2.10	1 Q	2.20	1st place, gold medalist(s)
Anatoly Ryapolov	Boys’ Long Jump	7.65	1 Q	7.54	1st place, gold medalist(s)
Vladimir Shcherbakov	Boys’ Pole Vault	4.90	1 Q	5.05	2nd place, silver medalist(s)

=== Girls ===
Track and Road Events

Athletes	Event	Heats		Final	
Athletes	Event	Result	Rank	Result	Rank
Ekaterina Alekseeva	Girls’ 800m	2:09.32 SB	5 Q	2:09.21 SB	7

Field Events

Athletes	Event	Qualification		Final	
Athletes	Event	Result	Rank	Result	Rank
Ekaterina Kropivko	Girls’ Long Jump	5.50	11 qB	5.92	1
Alena Bugakova	Girls’ Shot Put	18.86	1	18.95	1st place, gold medalist(s)
Tatyana Blagoveshchenskaya	Girls’ Triple Jump	12.86	3	12.83	4

== Basketball ==
Russia qualified a boys' team from their performance at the 2013 U18 3x3 World Championships.

Skills Competition

Athlete	Event	Qualification				Final			
Athlete	Event	Round 1	Round 2	Total	Rank	Round 1	Round 2	Total	Rank
Vladislav Staratelev	Boys' Dunk Contest	23	28	51	5	Did not advance			

=== Boys' tournament ===
Roster

- Kirill Gornaev
- Vladimir Ivanov
- Vladislav Staratelev
- Alexey Zherdev

Group Stage

Pos	Team	Pld	W	L	PF	PA	PD	Pts	Qualification
1	Argentina	9	7	2	156	101	+55	16	Round of 16
2	Russia	9	7	2	153	117	+36	16	Round of 16
3	Spain	9	7	2	145	135	+10	16	Round of 16
4	New Zealand	9	6	3	145	129	+16	15	Round of 16
5	Venezuela	9	5	4	136	128	+8	14	Round of 16
6	Brazil	9	4	5	116	92	+24	13 (Note: BRA +5, ROU −5)	Round of 16
7	Romania	9	4	5	130	122	+8	13	Round of 16
8	Tunisia	9	3	6	115	130	−15	12	Round of 16
9	Andorra	9	2	7	129	168	−39	11	Eliminated
10	Guatemala	9	0	9	74	177	−103	9	Eliminated

Notes:

18 August 2014
17:00

Andorra	13–21	Russia

Wutaishan Sports Center, Nanjing

18 August 2014
21:20

Russia	20–8	Guatemala

Wutaishan Sports Center, Nanjing

19 August 2014
19:40

Spain	16–15	Russia

Wutaishan Sports Center, Nanjing

20 August 2014
17:40

Russia	14–15	Venezuela

Wutaishan Sports Center, Nanjing

20 August 2014
21:00

Brazil	8–14	Russia

Wutaishan Sports Center, Nanjing

22 August 2014
19:20

Russia	13–11	Argentina

Wutaishan Sports Center, Nanjing

23 August 2014
18:20

Romania	17–21	Russia

Wutaishan Sports Center, Nanjing

23 August 2014
21:20

Russia	17–13	Tunisia

Wutaishan Sports Center, Nanjing

24 August 2014
19:20

New Zealand	16–18	Russia

Wutaishan Sports Center, Nanjing

Knockout stage

Round of 16	Quarterfinals	Semifinals	Final	Rank
Opposition Score	Opposition Score	Opposition Score	Opposition Score	Rank
Hungary; W 17-12	Brazil; W 12–8	Lithuania; L 10–13	Argentina; L 14-17	4

== Beach volleyball ==
Russia qualified a boys' and girls' team from their performance at the 2014 CEV Youth Continental Cup Final.

Athletes	Event	Preliminary round	Standing	Round of 24	Round of 16	Quarterfinals	Semifinals	Final / BM	Rank
Athletes	Event	Opposition Score	Standing	Opposition Score	Opposition Score	Opposition Score	Opposition Score	Opposition Score	Rank
Artem Iarzutkin; Oleg Stoyanovskiy	Boys'	Bosco Ndayishimiye (BDI); Fiston Niyongabo (BDI); 21-12, 21-12	1 Q	—	Andrew Richards (CAN); Jake MacNeil (CAN); 21-15, 21-16	Arthur Lanci (BRA); George Wanderley (BRA); 15-21, 21-9, 15-12	Miro Määttänen (FIN); Santeri Siren (FIN); 21-11, 21-10	Tigrito Gómez (VEN); Rolando Hernández (VEN); 21-12, 21-13	1st place, gold medalist(s)
Artem Iarzutkin; Oleg Stoyanovskiy	Boys'	Anders Berntsen Mol (NOR); Mathias Berntsen (NOR); 21-19, 21-16	1 Q	—	Andrew Richards (CAN); Jake MacNeil (CAN); 21-15, 21-16	Arthur Lanci (BRA); George Wanderley (BRA); 15-21, 21-9, 15-12	Miro Määttänen (FIN); Santeri Siren (FIN); 21-11, 21-10	Tigrito Gómez (VEN); Rolando Hernández (VEN); 21-12, 21-13	1st place, gold medalist(s)
Artem Iarzutkin; Oleg Stoyanovskiy	Boys'	Renato Bogarin (PAR); Elioth Frutos (PAR); 21-12, 21-15	1 Q	—	Andrew Richards (CAN); Jake MacNeil (CAN); 21-15, 21-16	Arthur Lanci (BRA); George Wanderley (BRA); 15-21, 21-9, 15-12	Miro Määttänen (FIN); Santeri Siren (FIN); 21-11, 21-10	Tigrito Gómez (VEN); Rolando Hernández (VEN); 21-12, 21-13	1st place, gold medalist(s)
Artem Iarzutkin; Oleg Stoyanovskiy	Boys'	Erik Flores (GUA); Mark Álvarez (GUA); 21-15, 21-11	1 Q	—	Andrew Richards (CAN); Jake MacNeil (CAN); 21-15, 21-16	Arthur Lanci (BRA); George Wanderley (BRA); 15-21, 21-9, 15-12	Miro Määttänen (FIN); Santeri Siren (FIN); 21-11, 21-10	Tigrito Gómez (VEN); Rolando Hernández (VEN); 21-12, 21-13	1st place, gold medalist(s)
Artem Iarzutkin; Oleg Stoyanovskiy	Boys'	Thantrige Perera Mallawa (SRI); Isuru Madushan Siddihaluge (SRI); 21-16, 21-15	1 Q	—	Andrew Richards (CAN); Jake MacNeil (CAN); 21-15, 21-16	Arthur Lanci (BRA); George Wanderley (BRA); 15-21, 21-9, 15-12	Miro Määttänen (FIN); Santeri Siren (FIN); 21-11, 21-10	Tigrito Gómez (VEN); Rolando Hernández (VEN); 21-12, 21-13	1st place, gold medalist(s)
Nadezhda Makroguzova; Daria Rudykh	Girls'	Camila Hiruela (ARG); Irene Verasio (ARG); 29-27, 18-21, 15-5	1 Q	—	Irene Enzo (ITA); Michela Lantignotti (ITA); 21-16, 21-17	Mona Gesslbauer (AUT); Julia Radl] (AUT); 17-21, 21-11, 16-14	Ana Patrícia Ramos (BRA); Eduarda Lisboa] (BRA); 18-21, 19-21	Lisa Arnholdt (GER); Sarah Schneider (GER); 14-21, 25-27	4
Nadezhda Makroguzova; Daria Rudykh	Girls'	Lina Bernier Colon (PUR); Valeria Cajigas Medina (PUR)	1 Q	—	Irene Enzo (ITA); Michela Lantignotti (ITA); 21-16, 21-17	Mona Gesslbauer (AUT); Julia Radl] (AUT); 17-21, 21-11, 16-14	Ana Patrícia Ramos (BRA); Eduarda Lisboa] (BRA); 18-21, 19-21	Lisa Arnholdt (GER); Sarah Schneider (GER); 14-21, 25-27	4
Nadezhda Makroguzova; Daria Rudykh	Girls'	Phoebe Bell (AUS); Britt Kendall (AUS); 21-11, 21-9	1 Q	—	Irene Enzo (ITA); Michela Lantignotti (ITA); 21-16, 21-17	Mona Gesslbauer (AUT); Julia Radl] (AUT); 17-21, 21-11, 16-14	Ana Patrícia Ramos (BRA); Eduarda Lisboa] (BRA); 18-21, 19-21	Lisa Arnholdt (GER); Sarah Schneider (GER); 14-21, 25-27	4
Nadezhda Makroguzova; Daria Rudykh	Girls'	Seraphine Mukantambara (RWA); Lea Uwimbabazi (RWA)	1 Q	—	Irene Enzo (ITA); Michela Lantignotti (ITA); 21-16, 21-17	Mona Gesslbauer (AUT); Julia Radl] (AUT); 17-21, 21-11, 16-14	Ana Patrícia Ramos (BRA); Eduarda Lisboa] (BRA); 18-21, 19-21	Lisa Arnholdt (GER); Sarah Schneider (GER); 14-21, 25-27	4
Nadezhda Makroguzova; Daria Rudykh	Girls'	Floflo Daniel (VAN); Loti Joe (VAN); 21-18, 21-15	1 Q	—	Irene Enzo (ITA); Michela Lantignotti (ITA); 21-16, 21-17	Mona Gesslbauer (AUT); Julia Radl] (AUT); 17-21, 21-11, 16-14	Ana Patrícia Ramos (BRA); Eduarda Lisboa] (BRA); 18-21, 19-21	Lisa Arnholdt (GER); Sarah Schneider (GER); 14-21, 25-27	4

== Boxing ==
Russia qualified three boxers based on its performance at the 2014 AIBA Youth World Championships

Boys

Athlete	Event	Preliminaries	Semifinals	Final / RM	Rank
Athlete	Event	Opposition Result	Opposition Result	Opposition Result	Rank
Bibert Tumenov	-64 kg	Bye	Suzuki (JPN); L DISQ	Bronze Medal Bout Avcı (TUR); L 1-2	4
Dmitrii Nesterov	-75 kg	Bye	Plantić (CRO); W 3-0	Gadzhyiev (UKR); L 0-3	2nd place, silver medalist(s)
Marat Kerimkhanov	+91 kg	Komor (HUN); W 3-0	Rock (USA); L 1-2	Bronze Medal Bout Tahirov (AZE); W 3-0	3rd place, bronze medalist(s)

== Canoeing ==
Russia qualified two boats based on its performance at the 2013 World Junior Canoe Sprint and Slalom Championships.

Boys

Athlete	Event	Qualification		Repechage		Round of 16		Quarterfinals	Semifinals	Final / BM	Rank
Athlete	Event	Time	Rank	Time	Rank	Time	Rank	Opposition Result	Opposition Result	Opposition Result	Rank
Vladislav Oleynikov	K1 slalom	DSQ		Did not advance							
Vladislav Oleynikov	K1 sprint	1:34.272	2 Q	Bye		1:35.236	3 Q	Brent (CAN); W 1:34.626	Daineka (BLR); L 1:33.833	Milinković (SRB); W 1:39.049	3rd place, bronze medalist(s)

Girls

Athlete	Event	Qualification		Repechage		Round of 16		Quarterfinals	Semifinals	Final / BM	Rank
Athlete	Event	Time	Rank	Time	Rank	Time	Rank	Opposition Result	Opposition Result	Opposition Result	Rank
Inna Nikitina	K1 slalom	1:32.931	13 R	1:51.652	10	Did not advance					
Inna Nikitina	K1 sprint	1:45.980	1 Q	Bye		1:45.394	1 Q	Duta (ROU); W 1:42.852	Kaltenberger (KAZ); W 1:43.686	Homonnai (HUN); W 1:49.922	1st place, gold medalist(s)

== Fencing ==
Russia qualified four athletes based on its performance at the 2014 FIE Cadet World Championships.

Boys

Athlete	Event	Pool Round	Seed	Round of 16	Quarterfinals	Semifinals	Final / BM	Rank
Athlete	Event	Opposition Score	Seed	Opposition Score	Opposition Score	Opposition Score	Opposition Score	Rank
Ivan Limarev	Épée	Esztergályos (HUN) W 5–3; Flygare (SWE) L 3–5; Unterhauser (GER) L 2–5; Shaheen (SYR) W 5–1; Chien (HKG) W 5–2; Hassane (NIG) W 5-1	3	Bye	French (CAN); W 15–5	Esztergályos (HUN); L 5–15	Yoo (USA); W 15–14	3rd place, bronze medalist(s)
Ivan Ilin	Sabre	Yan (CHN) W 5–0; Cucu (ROU) W 5–4; Kim (KOR) W 5–4; Al-Musawi (IRQ) W 5–1; Ayman (EGY) W 5–1; Al-Shamlan (KUW) W 5–4	1	Bye	Shengelia (GEO); W 15–8	Ferjani (TUN); W 15–10	Kim (KOR); W 15–7	1st place, gold medalist(s)

Girls

Athlete	Event	Pool Round	Seed	Round of 16	Quarterfinals	Semifinals	Final / BM	Rank
Athlete	Event	Opposition Score	Seed	Opposition Score	Opposition Score	Opposition Score	Opposition Score	Rank
Marta Martyanova	Foil	Elsharkawy (EGY) W 5–2; Zhao (CAN) W 3–2; Borella (ITA) L 4–5; Szymczak (POL) L 2–5; Kontochristopoulou (GRE) L 4–5; Lau (HKG) W 5–4	8	Kontochristopoulou (GRE); W 15–11	Szymczak (POL); W 15–13	Miyawaki (JPN); L 10–13	Huang (CHN); L 8–13	4
Alina Moseyko	Sabre	Emura (JPN) L 1–5; Ciss (SEN) W 5-0; Gkountoura (GRE) W 5–4; Köse (TUR) W 5–2; Matuszak (POL) W 5–2; Koutoglo (TOG) W 5–2	2	Bye	Toledo (MEX); W 15–14	Záhonyi (HUN); W 15–12	Crovari (ITA); W 15–10	1st place, gold medalist(s)

Mixed team

Athletes	Event	Round of 16	Quarterfinals	Semifinals / PM	Final / BM / PM	Rank
Athletes	Event	Opposition Score	Opposition Score	Opposition Score	Opposition Score	Rank
Europe 1 Patrik Esztergályos (HUN); Marta Martyanova (RUS); Ivan Ilin (RUS); Eleonora De Marchi (ITA); Andrzej Rządkowski (POL); Alina Moseyko (RUS)	Mixed Team	Bye	Americas 2 W 30–29	Asia-Oceania 2 W 30–29	Asia-Oceania 1 L 26–30	2nd place, silver medalist(s)
Europe 3 Ivan Limarev (RUS); Flóra Pásztor (HUN); Nika Shengelia (GEO); Anna Mroszczak (POL); Guillaume Bianchi (ITA); Petra Záhonyi (HUN)	Mixed Team	Bye	Asia-Oceania 2 L 26–30	Americas 2 L 29–30	Americas 1 W 30–28	7

== Gymnastics ==
=== Artistic gymnastics ===
Russia qualified one athlete based on its performance at the 2014 European MAG Championships and another athlete based on its performance at the 2014 European WAG Championships.

Boys

athlete	Event	Apparatus						Total	Rank
athlete	Event	F	PH	R	V	PB	HB	Total	Rank
Nikita Nagornyy	Qualification	13.900 Q	13.900 Q	13.900 Q	13.950 Q	14.050 Q	13.800 Q	83.500 Q	2
Nikita Nagornyy	All-around	13.550	13.800	13.950	14.850	13.300	13.600	83.050	2nd place, silver medalist(s)
Nikita Nagornyy	Floor	13.700	—N/a					13.700	4
Nikita Nagornyy	Pommel horse	—N/a	13.966	—N/a				13.966	1st place, gold medalist(s)
Nikita Nagornyy	Rings	—N/a		14.000	—N/a			14.000	1st place, gold medalist(s)
Nikita Nagornyy	Vault	—N/a			14.383	—N/a		14.383	3rd place, bronze medalist(s)
Nikita Nagornyy	Parallel bars	—N/a				14.033	—N/a	14.033	1st place, gold medalist(s)
Nikita Nagornyy	Horizontal bar	—N/a					12.000	12.000	8

Girls

Athlete	Event	Apparatus				Total	Rank
Athlete	Event	V	UB	BB	F	Total	Rank
Seda Tutkhalyan	Qualification	14.300 Q	13.000 Q	12.900	13.150 Q	53.650 Q	1
Seda Tutkhalyan	All-around	14.400	14.050	14.000	12.450	54.900	1st place, gold medalist(s)
Seda Tutkhalyan	Vault	13.816	—N/a			13.816	5
Seda Tutkhalyan	Uneven bars	—N/a	13.575	—N/a		13.575	1st place, gold medalist(s)
Seda Tutkhalyan	Floor	—N/a			13.733	13.733	2nd place, silver medalist(s)

=== Rhythmic gymnastics ===
Russia qualified one individual and one team based on its performance at the 2014 Rhythmic Gymnastics Grand Prix in Moscow.

Individual

Athlete	Event	Qualification						Final					
Athlete	Event	Hoop	Ball	Clubs	Ribbon	Total	Rank	Hoop	Ball	Clubs	Ribbon	Total	Rank
Irina Annenkova	Individual	15.150	14.575	14.800	14.425	58.950	1 Q	14.975	14.800	14.450	14.350	58.575	1st place, gold medalist(s)

Group

Athletes	Event	Qualification				Final			
Athletes	Event	4 Hoops	4 Ribbons	Total	Rank	4 Hoops	4 Ribbons	Total	Rank
Daria Anenkova; Daria Dubova; Victoria Ilina; Natalia Safonova; Sofya Skomorokh	Group	14.750	14.900	29.650	1 Q	14.700	14.850	29.550	1st place, gold medalist(s)

=== Trampoline ===
Russia qualified two athletes based on its performance at the 2014 European Trampoline Championships.

Athlete	Event	Qualification				Final	
Athlete	Event	Routine 1	Routine 2	Total	Rank	Score	Rank
Dmitriy Zenkin	Boys	44.050	21.665	65.715	9	Did not advance	
Maria Zakharchuk	Girls	44.245	52.225	96.470	1	52.360	3rd place, bronze medalist(s)

== Handball ==
Russia qualified a girls' team based on its performance at the 2013 European Women's Youth Handball Championship

=== Girls' tournament ===
Roster

- Daria Belikova
- Marianna Egorova
- Yaroslava Frolova
- Yulia Golikova
- Julia Komarova
- Kristina Likhach
- Elizaveta Malashenko
- Yulia Markova
- Anastasia Riabtceva
- Anastasia Starshova
- Anastasia Suslova
- Anastasia Titovskaya
- Valentina Vernigorova
- Liudmila Vydrina

Group stage

Pos	Team	Pld	W	D	L	GF	GA	GD	Pts	Qualification
1	Russia	2	2	0	0	70	52	+18	4	Semifinals
2	South Korea	2	1	0	1	70	59	+11	2	Semifinals
3	Angola	2	0	0	2	44	73	−29	0	5th place game

Source: Nanjing 2014
Rules for classification: 1) points; 2) head-to-head points; 3) head-to-head goal difference; 4) head-to-head number of goals scored; 5) goal difference.

20 August; 14:00	Angola	21 - 34	Russia	Jiangning Sports Center Gymnasium; Referees: Engberg, Laurell (Sweden)
20 August; 14:00	Paulino 8	(12 - 20)	three players 4	Jiangning Sports Center Gymnasium; Referees: Engberg, Laurell (Sweden)
20 August; 14:00	1× (yellow card) 1× (suspension)	Report	3× (yellow card) 3× (suspension)	Jiangning Sports Center Gymnasium; Referees: Engberg, Laurell (Sweden)

22 August; 14:00	Russia	36 - 31	South Korea	Jiangning Sports Center Gymnasium; Referees: Wang, Li (China)
22 August; 14:00	Frolova 9	(16 - 16)	Yu 7	Jiangning Sports Center Gymnasium; Referees: Wang, Li (China)
22 August; 14:00	2× (yellow card) 3× (suspension)	Report	3× (yellow card) 1× (suspension)	Jiangning Sports Center Gymnasium; Referees: Wang, Li (China)

Semifinal

24 August; 15:30	Russia	30 - 22	Brazil	Jiangning Sports Center Gymnasium; Referees: Liu, Li (China)
24 August; 15:30	Golikova, Vernigorova 5	(17 - 7)	Almeida de Paula 6	Jiangning Sports Center Gymnasium; Referees: Liu, Li (China)
24 August; 15:30	4× (yellow card) 3× (suspension)	Report	3× (yellow card) 1× (suspension)	Jiangning Sports Center Gymnasium; Referees: Liu, Li (China)

Final

25 August; 18:00	South Korea	32 - 31	Russia (silver)	Jiangning Sports Center Gymnasium; Referees: Engberg, Laurell (Sweden)
25 August; 18:00	Kang 12	(17 - 14)	Golikova, Markova 7	Jiangning Sports Center Gymnasium; Referees: Engberg, Laurell (Sweden)
25 August; 18:00	3× (yellow card) 5× (suspension)	Report	3× (yellow card) 7× (suspension)	Jiangning Sports Center Gymnasium; Referees: Engberg, Laurell (Sweden)

== Judo ==
Russia qualified two athletes based on its performance at the 2013 Cadet World Judo Championships.

Individual

Athlete	Event	Round of 32	Round of 16	Quarterfinals	Semifinals	Rep 1	Rep 2	Rep 3	Rep 4	Final / BM	Rank
Athlete	Event	Opposition Result	Opposition Result	Opposition Result	Opposition Result	Opposition Result	Opposition Result	Opposition Result	Opposition Result	Opposition Result	Rank
Mikhail Igolnikov	Boys' -81 kg	Bye	Basile (BRA); W 102–000	Milić (MNE); W 100–000	Majdov (SRB); W 100–000	Bye				Kirakozashvili (GEO); W 000–000	1st place, gold medalist(s)
Anastasya Turcheva	Girls' -44 kg	—N/a		Soriano (DOM); W 001–000	Aliyeva (AZE); L 000–000	Bye	—N/a			Quizhpi (ECU); W 000–000	3rd place, bronze medalist(s)

Team

Athletes	Event	Round of 16	Quarterfinals	Semifinals	Final	Rank
Athletes	Event	Opposition Result	Opposition Result	Opposition Result	Opposition Result	Rank
Team Rouge; Morgane Duchêne (FRA); Ayelén Elizeche (ARG); Adrián Gandía (PUR); Mikhail Igolnikov (RUS); Lisa Millenberg (NED); Maria Siderot (POR); Sukhrob Tursunov (UZB)	Mixed Team	Team Kano (MIX); W 5–2	Team Ruska (MIX); W 5–2	Team Xian (MIX); W 4–3	Team Geesink (MIX); W 4–2	1st place, gold medalist(s)
Team Geesink; Layana Colman (BRA); Nemanja Majdov (SRB); Dzmitry Minkou (BLR); Ryu Seung-hwan (KOR); Ivana Sunjevic (MNE); Anastasya Turcheva (RUS); Wang Yu-jyun (TPE)	Mixed Team	Team Chochishvili (MIX); W 4–3	Team Van de Walle (MIX); W 4–3	Team Douillet (MIX); W 3^{2}–3^{1}	Team Rougé (MIX); L 2–4	2nd place, silver medalist(s)

== Modern pentathlon ==
Russia qualified two athletes based on its performance at the European YOG Qualifiers.

Athlete	Event	Fencing Ranking Round (épée one touch)		Swimming (200 m freestyle)			Fencing Final Round (épée one touch)			Combined: Shooting/Running (10 m air pistol)/(3000 m)			Total Points	Rank
Athlete	Event	Results	Rank	Time	Rank	Points	Results	Rank	Points	Time	Rank	Points	Total Points	Rank
Alexander Lifanov	Boys' Individual	17–6	2	2:10.22	16	310		3	295	12:01.30	2	579	1184	1st place, gold medalist(s)
Adelina Ibatullina	Girls' Individual	12–11	12	2:19.32	8	283		12	250	13:31.54	5	489	1022	6
Jolana Hojsáková (CZE); Alexander Lifanov (RUS)	Mixed Relay	34–12	1	2:01.70	6	335	1–0	1	303	12:51.06	19	529	1167	6
Adelina Ibatullina (RUS); Radion Khripchenko (KGZ)	Mixed Relay	23–23	11	2:06.10	20	322	1–1	11	270	12:11.28	5	569	1161	7

== Sailing ==
Russia qualified one boat based on its performance at the 2013 Techno 293 World Championships. Later Russia qualified one more boat based on its performance at the Techno 293 European Continental Qualifiers.

Athlete	Event	Race											Net Points	Final Rank
Athlete	Event	1	2	3	4	5	6	7	8	9	10	M*	Net Points	Final Rank
Maxim Tokarev	Boys' Techno 293	(9)	3	6	1	2	4	3	Cancelled			28.00	19.00	2nd place, silver medalist(s)
Mariam Sekhposyan	Girls' Techno 293	7	2	3	(10)	1	3	2	Cancelled			28.00	18.00	2nd place, silver medalist(s)

== Shooting ==
Russia qualified two shooters based on its performance at the 2014 European Shooting Championships.

Individual

Athlete	Event	Qualification		Final	
Athlete	Event	Points	Rank	Points	Rank
Ekaterina Parshukova	Girls' 10m Air Rifle	407.9	12	Did not advance	
Margarita Lomova	Girls' 10m Air Pistol	378	4 Q	194.4	2nd place, silver medalist(s)

Team

Athletes	Event	Qualification		Round of 16	Quarterfinals	Semifinals	Final / BM	Rank
Athletes	Event	Points	Rank	Opposition Result	Opposition Result	Opposition Result	Opposition Result	Rank
Ekaterina Parshukova (RUS); Borna Petanjek (CRO)	Mixed Team 10m Air Rifle		7 Q	Akter (BAN)- Babayan (ARM); L 7-10	Did not advance			17
Margarita Lomova (RUS); Juan Sebastián Rivera (COL)	Mixed Team 10m Air Pistol		10 Q	Konarieva (UKR)- Aric (MDA); L 9-10	Did not advance			17

== Swimming ==
Russia qualified eight swimmers.

Boys

Athlete	Event	Heat		Semifinal		Final	
Athlete	Event	Time	Rank	Time	Rank	Time	Rank
Filipp Shopin	100 m freestyle	50.44	5	50.58	9	Did not advance	
Filipp Shopin	50 m backstroke	26.20	7	25.79	4	Did not advance	
Filipp Shopin	100 m backstroke	56.94 Q	15	56.38	13	Did not advance	
Filipp Shopin	50 m butterfly	25.00 Q	14	24.82	12	Did not advance	
Evgeny Rylov	50 m backstroke	25.66	2 Q	25.42	2 Q	25.09 WJR	1st place, gold medalist(s)
Evgeny Rylov	100 m backstroke	55.78	4 Q	54.86	3 Q	54.24	1st place, gold medalist(s)
Evgeny Rylov	200 m backstroke	2:00.74	1 Q	—N/a		1:57.08	2nd place, silver medalist(s)
Anton Chupkov	50 m breaststroke	28.51	3 Q	28.50	3 Q	28.43	3rd place, bronze medalist(s)
Anton Chupkov	100 m breaststroke	1:02.07	2 Q	1:00.84 WJR	1 Q	1:01.29	1st place, gold medalist(s)
Anton Chupkov	200 m breaststroke	2:15.46	3 Q	—N/a		2:11.87	3rd place, bronze medalist(s)
Aleksandr Sadovnikov	50 m butterfly	24.49	4 Q	24.09	3 Q	24.16	4
Aleksandr Sadovnikov	100 m butterfly	53.64	2 Q	53.42	2 Q	52.97	2nd place, silver medalist(s)
Anton Chupkov; Evgeny Rylov; Aleksandr Sadovnikov; Filipp Shopin	4 × 100 m freestyle relay	3:24.95	1 Q	—N/a		3:25.01	4
Anton Chupkov; Evgeny Rylov; Aleksandr Sadovnikov; Filipp Shopin	4 × 100 m medley relay	3:43.47	1 Q	—N/a		3:38.02 WJR	1st place, gold medalist(s)

Girls

Athlete	Event	Heat		Semifinal		Final	
Athlete	Event	Time	Rank	Time	Rank	Time	Rank
Rozaliya Nasretdinova	50 m freestyle	25.00	1 Q	25.20	1 Q	24.28 WJR	1st place, gold medalist(s)
Rozaliya Nasretdinova	50 m backstroke	30.15	25	Did not advance			
Rozaliya Nasretdinova	50 m butterfly	26.98	2 Q	26.55	1 Q	26.26	1st place, gold medalist(s)
Daria S. Ustinova	50 m freestyle	25.80	4 Q	25.42	3 Q	25.56	3rd place, bronze medalist(s)
Daria S. Ustinova	100 m freestyle	55.99	6 Q	55.54	6 Q	55.69	7
Daria S. Ustinova	200 m freestyle	2:01.06	4 Q	—N/a		2:01.32	7
Daria Mullakaeva	100 m freestyle	56.06	7 Q	55.53	5	55.69	7
Daria Mullakaeva	200 m freestyle	2:01.06	4 Q	—N/a		2:01.32	7
Daria Mullakaeva	400 m freestyle	4:17.68	14	—N/a		Did not advance	
Irina Prikhodko	50 m backstroke	29.78	15 Q	29.28	7 Q	29.34	8
Irina Prikhodko	100 m backstroke	1:02.25	4 Q	1:02.24	7 Q	1:01.77	6
Irina Prikhodko	200 m backstroke	2:14.16	4 Q	—N/a		2:13.93	5
Daria Mullakaeva; Rozaliya Nasretdinova; Irina Prikhodko; Daria S. Ustinova	4 × 100 m freestyle relay	3:46.96	1 Q	—N/a		3:42.39	2nd place, silver medalist(s)
Daria Mullakaeva; Rozaliya Nasretdinova; Irina Prikhodko; Daria S. Ustinova	4 × 100 m medley relay	4:16.42	7 Q	—N/a		4:13.77	6

Mixed

Athlete	Event	Heat		Final	
Athlete	Event	Time	Rank	Time	Rank
Rozaliya Nasretdinova; Aleksandr Sadovnikov; Filipp Shopin; Daria S. Ustinova	4 × 100 m freestyle relay	3:35.40	4 Q	3:32.15	4
Rozaliya Nasretdinova; Evgeny Rylov; Aleksadr Sadovnikov; Daria S. Ustinova	4 × 100 m medley relay	3:54.71	2 Q	3:50.86	2nd place, silver medalist(s)

== Taekwondo ==
Russia qualified three athletes based on its performance at the Taekwondo Qualification Tournament.

Boys

Athlete	Event	Round of 16	Quarterfinals	Semifinals	Final	Rank
Athlete	Event	Opposition Result	Opposition Result	Opposition Result	Opposition Result	Rank
Soso Kvartskhava	−63 kg	Bye	McNeish (GBR); L 10 - 19	Did not advance		5

Girls

Athlete	Event	Round of 16	Quarterfinals	Semifinals	Final	Rank
Athlete	Event	Opposition Result	Opposition Result	Opposition Result	Opposition Result	Rank
Tatiana Kudashova	−55 kg	Bye	Bogdanović (SRB); W 18 (PTG) - 6	Sarıdoğan (TUR); L 8 - 10	Did not advance	3rd place, bronze medalist(s)
Yulia Turutina	−63 kg	Bye	Jelić (CRO); W 7 - 4	Zhang (CHN); W 11 - 1	Alizadeh (IRI); L 7 - 10	2nd place, silver medalist(s)

== Tennis ==
Russia qualified four athletes based on the 9 June 2014 ITF World Junior Rankings.

Singles

Athlete	Event	Round of 32	Round of 16	Quarterfinals	Semifinals	Final / BM	Rank
Athlete	Event	Opposition Score	Opposition Score	Opposition Score	Opposition Score	Opposition Score	Rank
Karen Khachanov	Boys' Singles	Sharmal Dissanayake (SRI); 6-0, 6-0	Harry Bourchier (AUS); 6-4, 6-2	Jumpei Yamasaki (JPN); 3-6, 7-6^{(8–6)}, 1–6	Did not advance		5
Andrey Rublev	Boys' Singles	Nicolás Álvarez (PER); 6-3, 6-4	Martin Blaško (SVK); 5-7, 6-2, 6-2	Francisco Bahamonde (ARG) w/o	Kamil Majchrzak (POL); 4-6, 6-3, 3-6	Jumpei Yamasaki (JPN); 6-1, 6-3	3rd place, bronze medalist(s)
Darya Kasatkina	Girls' Singles	Ioana Ducu (ROU); 6-3, 6-0	Doménica González (ECU); 6-2, 6-1	Akvilė Paražinskaitė (LTU); 4-6, 4-6	Did not advance		5
Anastasiya Komardina	Girls' Singles	Anhelina Kalinina (UKR); 7-6^{(7-3)}, 3-6, 2-6	Did not advance				17

Doubles

Athletes	Event	Round of 32	Round of 16	Quarterfinals	Semifinals	Final / BM	Rank
Athletes	Event	Opposition Score	Opposition Score	Opposition Score	Opposition Score	Opposition Score	Rank
Karen Khachanov (RUS); Andrey Rublev (RUS)	Boys' Doubles	—N/a	Rasheed Carey (BAH); Justin Roberts (BAH); 6-1, 6-3	André Biró (HUN); Clément Geens (BEL); 6-4, 6-4	Kamil Majchrzak (POL); Jan Zieliński (POL); 4-6, 6-3, [10-8]	Orlanda Luz (BRA); Marcelo Zormann (BRA); 5-7, 6-3, [3-10]	2nd place, silver medalist(s)
Darya Kasatkina (RUS); Anastasiya Komardina (RUS)	Girls' Doubles	—N/a	Kamonwan Buayam (THA); Kim Dabin (KOR); 6-7^{(5-7)}, 6-3, [11-9]	Anna Bondár (HUN); Fanny Stollár (HUN); 7-6^{(7-2)}, 6-4	Anna Bondár (USA); Fanny Stollár (MEX); 6-2, 6-4	Anhelina Kalinina (UKR); Iryna Shymanovich (BLR); 4-6, 4-6	2nd place, silver medalist(s)
Darya Kasatkina (RUS); Andrey Rublev (RUS)	Mixed Doubles	Kristína Schmiedlová (SVK); Alex Molčan (SVK); 6-2, 6-4	Ye Qiuyu (CHN); Jumpei Yamasaki (JPN); 5-7, 6-4, [3-10]	Did not advance			9
Anastasiya Komardina (RUS); Karen Khachanov (RUS)	Mixed Doubles	Renata Zarazúa (MEX); Justin Roberts (BAH); 6-4, 6-2	Viktória Kužmová (SVK); Martin Blaško (SVK); 6-3, 6-1	Ioana Ducu (ROU); Matías Zukas (ARG); 6-7^{(2-7)}, 4-6	Did not advance		5

== Triathlon ==
Russia qualified two athletes based on its performance at the 2014 European Youth Olympic Games Qualifier.

Individual

Athlete	Event	Swim (750m)	Trans 1	Bike (20 km)	Trans 2	Run (5 km)	Total Time	Rank
Dmitry Efimov	Boys	00:09:56	00:00:43	00:29:20	00:00:33	00:17:24	00:57:56	17
Elizaveta Zhizhina	Girls	00:10:29	00:00:43	00:31:24	00:00:24	00:18:39	01:01:39	7

Relay

Athlete	Event	Total Times per Athlete (Swim 250m, Bike 6.6 km, Run 1.8 km)	Total Group Time	Rank
Europe 2 Elizaveta Zhizhina (RUS); Alberto Gonzalez Garcia (ESP); Kirsten Nuyens (NED); Peer Sonksen (GER)	Mixed Relay	21:39; 19:33; 23:12; 19:51	1:24:15	5
Europe 5 Sara Skardelly (AUT); Romain Loop (BEL); Flora Bicsak (HUN); Dmitry Efimov (RUS)	Mixed Relay	22:33; 20:42; 23:20; 20:11	1:26:46	9

== Weightlifting ==
Russia qualified 2 quotas in the boys' events and 2 quotas in the girls' events based on the team ranking after the 2013 Weightlifting Youth World Championships.

Boys

Athlete	Event	Snatch		Clean & jerk		Total	Rank
Athlete	Event	Result	Rank	Result	Rank	Total	Rank
Viacheslav Iarkin	−69 kg	134	1	160	2	294	2nd place, silver medalist(s)
Khetag Khugaev	−85 kg	164	1	191	1	355	1st place, gold medalist(s)

Girls

Athlete	Event	Snatch		Clean & jerk		Total	Rank
Athlete	Event	Result	Rank	Result	Rank	Total	Rank
Anastasia Petrova	−58 kg	85	2	110	2	195	2nd place, silver medalist(s)
Svetlana Shcherbakova	+63 kg	103	3	125	2	228	2nd place, silver medalist(s)

== Wrestling ==
Russia qualified five athletes based on its performance at the 2014 European Cadet Championships.

Key:

- VT - Victory by Fall.
- PP - Decision by Points - the loser with technical points.
- PO - Decision by Points - the loser without technical points.

Boys

Athlete	Event	Group stage					Final / RM	Rank
Athlete	Event	Opposition Score	Opposition Score	Opposition Score	Opposition Score	Rank	Opposition Score	Rank
Ismail Gadzhiev	Freestyle -46kg	Óscar Tigreros (COL); W 4 - 0 ^{ST}	Faifua Ipolito (ASA); W 4 - 0 ^{ST}	Prakash Vasant Kolekar (IND); W 4 - 0 ^{ST}	—	1	Cade Olivas (USA); W 3 - 1 ^{PP}	1st place, gold medalist(s)
Amirkhan Guvazhokov	Freestyle -54kg	Mukhambet Kuatbek (KAZ); L 1 - 3	Eliezer Aular (VEN); W 4 - 0	Vaghinak Matevosyan (ARM); L 1 - 3	Tyler Corbett (NZL); W 4 - 1	—	Reynhardt Louw (RSA); W 4 - 1 ^{ST}	5
Arslan Zubairov	Greco-Roman -58kg	Raiynbek Kurmanali (KAZ); W 3 - 1	Keramat Abdevali (IRI); W 4 - 0	Matthew Downes (NZL); W 4 - 1	—	1	Zaven Mikaelyan (ARM); W 4 - 1 ^{ST}	1st place, gold medalist(s)
Mark Bemalian	Greco-Roman -85kg	Ramandeep Khehira (CAN); W 4 - 0	Tokhirdzhon Okhonov (TJK); W 4 - 1	Schey-Xyong McMoore (ASA); W 4 - 0	—	1	Kiril Milov (BUL); W 3 - 1 ^{PP}	1st place, gold medalist(s)

Girls

Athlete	Event	Group stage					Final / RM	Rank
Athlete	Event	Opposition Score	Opposition Score	Opposition Score	Opposition Score	Rank	Opposition Score	Rank
Daria Shisterova	Freestyle -70kg	Leonela Ayoví (ECU); W 4 - 0	Merey Duisenova (KAZ); W 4 - 0	Natalia Iwona Strzalka (POL); W 4 - 0 ^{VT}	—	1	Tugba Kilic (TUR); W 4 - 0 ^{VT}	1st place, gold medalist(s)
