= Guyana at the 2014 Summer Youth Olympics =

- IOC code: GUY
- NOC: Guyana Olympic Association

in Nanjing
- Competitors: 4 in 3 sports
- Medals: Gold 0 Silver 0 Bronze 0 Total 0

Summer Youth Olympics appearances
- 2010; 2014; 2018

Guyana competed at the 2014 Summer Youth Olympics, in Nanjing, China from 16 August to 28 August 2014.

== Athletics ==
Guyana qualified one athlete.

Qualification Legend: Q=Final A (medal); qB=Final B (non-medal); qC=Final C (non-medal); qD=Final D (non-medal); qE=Final E (non-medal)

Boys
Track & road events

Athlete	Event	Heats		Final	
Athlete	Event	Result	Rank	Result	Rank
Jason Yaw	400 m	49.41	15 qB	47.47	9

== Swimming ==
Guyana qualified two swimmers.

Boys

Athlete	Event	Heat		Semifinal		Final	
Athlete	Event	Time	Rank	Time	Rank	Time	Rank
Hannibal Gaskin	100 m freestyle	58.03	36	did not advance			
Hannibal Gaskin	50 m butterfly	28.11	42	did not advance			

Girls

Athlete	Event	Heat		Semifinal		Final	
Athlete	Event	Time	Rank	Time	Rank	Time	Rank
Britany van Lange	50 m freestyle	28.43	36	did not advance			
Britany van Lange	100 m freestyle	1:01.41	33	did not advance			

== Table Tennis ==
Guyana was given a quota to compete by the tripartite committee.

Singles

Athlete	Event	Group Stage	Rank	Round of 16	Quarterfinals	Semifinals	Final / BM	Rank
Athlete	Event	Opposition Score	Rank	Opposition Score	Opposition Score	Opposition Score	Opposition Score	Rank
Chelsea Edghill	Girls	Group F N Bajor (POL); L 0 – 3	4 qB	A Zarif (FRA); L w/o	did not advance			25
Chelsea Edghill	Girls	K Mischek (AUT); L 0 – 3	4 qB	A Zarif (FRA); L w/o	did not advance			25
Chelsea Edghill	Girls	L Rakovac (CRO); L 0 – 3	4 qB	A Zarif (FRA); L w/o	did not advance			25

Team

Athletes	Event	Group Stage	Rank	Round of 16	Quarterfinals	Semifinals	Final / BM	Rank
Athletes	Event	Opposition Score	Rank	Opposition Score	Opposition Score	Opposition Score	Opposition Score	Rank
Latin America 3 Chelsea Edghill (GUY); Alejandro Toranzos (PAR)	Mixed	Thailand; T Khetkhuan (THA); P Tanviriyavechakul (THA); L 0 – 3	4 qB	Latin America 2 G Arvelo (VEN); F Tenti (ARG); L 1 – 2	did not advance			25
Latin America 3 Chelsea Edghill (GUY); Alejandro Toranzos (PAR)	Mixed	Austria; A Levenko (AUT); K Mischek (AUT); L 0 – 3	4 qB	Latin America 2 G Arvelo (VEN); F Tenti (ARG); L 1 – 2	did not advance			25
Latin America 3 Chelsea Edghill (GUY); Alejandro Toranzos (PAR)	Mixed	Croatia; L Rakovac (CRO); T Pucar (CRO); L 0 – 3	4 qB	Latin America 2 G Arvelo (VEN); F Tenti (ARG); L 1 – 2	did not advance			25

Qualification Legend: Q=Main Bracket (medal); qB=Consolation Bracket (non-medal)
