= Judo at the 2014 Summer Youth Olympics – Boys' 100 kg =

Judo competition

Boys' 100 kg at the II Summer Youth Olympic Games
- Venue: Longjiang Gymnasium
- Date: August 19
- Competitors: 4 from 4 nations

Medalists
1st place, gold medalist(s)		Ramin Safavieh	Iran
2nd place, silver medalist(s)		Rostislav Dashkov	Kyrgyzstan
3rd place, bronze medalist(s)		Domenik Schönefeldt	Germany

The Boys' 100 kg tournament in Judo at the 2014 Summer Youth Olympics was held on August 19 at the Longjiang Gymnasium.

This event was the heaviest of the boy's judo weight classes, limiting competitors to a maximum of 100 kilograms of body mass. The tournament bracket consisted of a single-elimination contest culminating in a gold medal match. Since there were only four attendees, it was decided that only one bronze medal will be granted instead of two bronze medals.

== Results ==
=== Main Bracket ===
Semifinals
Ramin Safavieh (IRI)	000
Domenik Schönefeldt (GER)	000
Rostislav Dashkov (KGZ)	100
Gustavo Basile (ARG)	000

Finals
Ramin Safavieh (IRI)	100
Rostislav Dashkov (KGZ)	000
Bronze Medal Finals
Domenik Schönefeldt (GER)	101
Gustavo Basile (ARG)	000
