= Cayman Islands at the 2026 Summer Youth Olympics =

- Flag of Cayman Islands
- IOC code: CAY
- NOC: Cayman Islands Olympic Committee

in Dakar, Senegal October 31, 2026 – November 13, 2026
- Competitors: 4 in 2 sports
- Flag bearers: Kate Galatopoulos & Pomian Rares
- Medals: Gold 0 Silver 0 Bronze 0 Total 0

Summer Youth Olympics appearances
- 2010; 2014; 2018; 2026

Cayman Islands is scheduled to compete at the 2026 Summer Youth Olympics in Dakar, Senegal from October 31 to November 13, 2026. This will mark Cayman Islands's fourth appearance at the Youth Olympics, after making its debut in 2010.

Swimmer Kate Galatopoulos and beach volleyball player Pomian Rares served as the flag bearers for the opening ceremony.

== Competitors ==
The following is the list of number of competitors participating at the Games per sport/discipline.

| Sport | Men | Women | Total |
|---|---|---|---|
| Beach volleyball | 2 | 0 | 2 |
| Swimming | 1 | 1 | 2 |
| Total | 3 | 1 | 4 |

== Beach volleyball ==
Cayman Islands received a quota place for the men's tournament.

Summary

| Team | Event | Group stage | | | | Round of 16 | Quarterfinals | Semifinals | Final / PG / BM | |
| Team | Event | Opposition Result | Opposition Result | Opposition Result | Rank | Opposition Result | Opposition Result | Opposition Result | Opposition Result | Rank |
|---|---|---|---|---|---|---|---|---|---|---|
| Rares Pomian; Dylan Simpson | Men's tournament | Hohenauer / Poinstingl (AUT) | Amir / Amin (IRI) | Mulapwa / Mutendi (COD) | | | | | | |

== Swimming ==
Cayman Islands entered two swimmers, one male and one female.

| Athlete | Event | Heat | | Semifinal | | Final | |
| Athlete | Event | Time | Rank | Time | Rank | Time | Rank |
|---|---|---|---|---|---|---|---|
| Lev Fahy | 50 m freestyle | | | | | | |
| Lev Fahy | 100 m freestyle | | | | | | |
| Lev Fahy | 50 m backstroke | | | | | | |
| Lev Fahy | 100 m backstroke | | | | | | |
| Kate Galatopoulos | 50 m freestyle | | | | | | |
| Kate Galatopoulos | 200 m freestyle | | | | | | |
| Kate Galatopoulos | 400 m freestyle | | | | | | |
| Kate Galatopoulos | 800 m freestyle | | | | | | |
