= Sailing at the 2014 Summer Youth Olympics – Boys' Techno 293 =

Boys' Techno 293 at the II Summer Youth Olympic Games
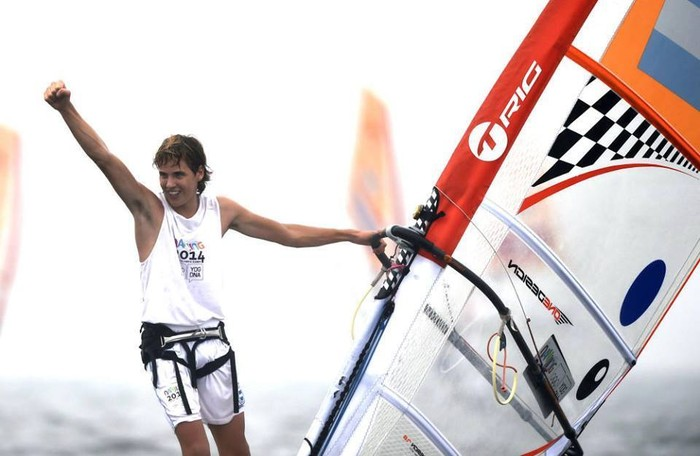
- Argentina's Francisco Saubidet Birkner after winning gold at the event
- Venue: Jinniu Lake
- Dates: August 18–23, 2014
- Competitors: 20 from 20 nations

Medalists
1st place, gold medalist(s)		Francisco Saubidet Birkner	Argentina
2nd place, silver medalist(s)		Maxim Tokarev	Russia
3rd place, bronze medalist(s)		Lars van Someren	Netherlands

The Boys' Techno 293 class competition at the 2014 Summer Youth Olympics in Nanjing took place from August 18 to August 23 at Jinniu Lake. 20 sailors competed in this Techno 293 competition.

== Results ==
Pos	Competitor	I	II	III	IV	V	VI	Medal Race	Points
1	Francisco Saubidet (ARG)	6	1	1	8	1	(11)	2	19
2	Maksim Tokarev (RUS)	(9)	3	6	1	2	4	3	19
3	Lars van Someren (NED)	1	4	(10)	9	3	2	4	23
4	Tom Monnet (FRA)	4	9	4	(11)	5	1	1	24
5	Yoav Omer (ISR)	5	2	(13)	4	6	5	5	27
6	Finn Croft (NZL)	(11)	6	3	2	7	6	8	32
7	Kensei Ikeda (JPN)	3	7	2	7	(9)	8	7	34
8	Chan Tsz Kit (HKG)	8	5	9	3	4	3	(17)	40
9	Ruggero Lo Mauro (ITA)	(14)	8	8	10	8	9	13	56
10	Toni Vrscaj (SLO)	12	13	7	(14)	10	7	10	59
11	Thanatip Suebyubon (THA)	10	12	5	6	13	12	(14)	59
12	Daniel Pereira (BRA)	2	(14)	11	12	14	13	11	63
13	Aung Set Naing (MAS)	7	(19)	16	5	16	14	15	73
14	Mack van den Eerenbeemt (ARU)	16	10	(18)	18	11	15	12	82
15	Wang Ting-Yu (TPE)	15	15	12	13	15	10	(18)	83
16	Maximo Nores (USA)	(18)	11	15	15	18	16	9	84
17	Safouan Mami (TUN)	17	17	17	(19)	19	17	6	93
18	Manuel de la Rosa (VEN)	13	(21 OCS)	14	17	12	18	21 OCS	95
19	Lucas Miranda (PUR)	19	16	19	16	17	(20)	16	103
20	Martin Beránek (SVK)	(20)	18	20	20	20	19	19	116

Scoring system: low-point system

Legend: DNE – Non excludable disqualification; DNF – Did not finish; DSQ – Disqualified; OCS – On the course side of the starting line; () – Discarded race not counted in the overall result;
