= United Arab Emirates at the 2014 Summer Youth Olympics =

- IOC code: UAE
- NOC: United Arab Emirates National Olympic Committee

in Nanjing
- Competitors: 4 in 4 sports
- Medals: Gold 0 Silver 0 Bronze 0 Total 0

Summer Youth Olympics appearances
- 2010; 2014; 2018; 2026

United Arab Emirates competed at the 2014 Summer Youth Olympics, in Nanjing, China from 16 August to 28 August 2014.

== Athletics ==
United Arab Emirates qualified one athlete.

Qualification Legend: Q=Final A (medal); qB=Final B (non-medal); qC=Final C (non-medal); qD=Final D (non-medal); qE=Final E (non-medal)

Girls
Field events

Athlete	Event	Qualification		Final	
Athlete	Event	Distance	Rank	Distance	Rank
Fatma Alhosani	Discus throw	37.20	13 qB	32.36	15

== Sailing ==
United Arab Emirates qualified one boat based on its performance at the Byte CII Asian Continental Qualifiers.

Athlete	Event	Race											Net Points	Final Rank
Athlete	Event	1	2	3	4	5	6	7	8	9	10	M*	Net Points	Final Rank
Hamad Alhammadi	Boys' Byte CII	27	21	~~29~~	27	27	21	27	CAN			28	178	28

== Shooting ==
United Arab Emirates was given a quota to compete by the tripartite committee.

Individual

Athlete	Event	Qualification		Final	
Athlete	Event	Points	Rank	Points	Rank
Yasmin Tahlak	Girls' 10m Air Rifle	404.8	15	did not advance	

Team

Athletes	Event	Qualification		Round of 16	Quarterfinals	Semifinals	Final / BM	Rank
Athletes	Event	Points	Rank	Opposition Result	Opposition Result	Opposition Result	Opposition Result	Rank
Yasmin Tahlak (UAE); Marco Suppini (ITA)	Mixed Team 10m Air Rifle	817.2	8 Q	J Budde (GER); L Decicilia (ARG); L 4 – 10	did not advance			12

== Swimming ==
United Arab Emirates qualified one swimmer.

Boys

Athlete	Event	Heat		Semifinal		Final	
Athlete	Event	Time	Rank	Time	Rank	Time	Rank
Ali Alkaabi	50 m butterfly	26.61	37	did not advance			
