= Seychelles at the 2014 Summer Youth Olympics =

- IOC code: SEY
- NOC: Seychelles Olympic and Commonwealth Games Association

in Nanjing
- Competitors: 3 in 3 sports
- Medals: Gold 0 Silver 0 Bronze 0 Total 0

Summer Youth Olympics appearances
- 2010; 2014; 2018

Seychelles competed at the 2014 Summer Youth Olympics, in Nanjing, China from 16 August to 28 August 2014.

== Badminton ==
Seychelles was given a quota to compete by the tripartite committee.

Singles

Athlete	Event	Group stage				Quarterfinal	Semifinal	Final / BM	Rank
Athlete	Event	Opposition Score	Opposition Score	Opposition Score	Rank	Opposition Score	Opposition Score	Opposition Score	Rank
Chlorie Cadeau	Girls' Singles	A Yamaguchi (JPN); L 0 – 2	M Blichfeldt (DEN); L 0 – 2	T Hendahewa (SRI); L 0 – 2	4	did not advance			

Doubles

Athlete	Event	Group stage				Quarterfinal	Semifinal	Final / BM	Rank
Athlete	Event	Opposition Score	Opposition Score	Opposition Score	Rank	Opposition Score	Opposition Score	Opposition Score	Rank
Chlorie Cadeau (SEY); Luís Enrique Peñalver (ESP)	Mixed Doubles	J Qin (CHN); M Narongrit (THA); L 0 – 2	R Hartawan (INA); D Guda (AUS); L 0 – 2	M Blichfeldt (DEN); D Mananga (CGO); W 2 – 0	3	did not advance			

== Swimming ==
Seychelles qualified one swimmer.

Boys

Athlete	Event	Heat		Semifinal		Final	
Athlete	Event	Time	Rank	Time	Rank	Time	Rank
Adam Viktora	50 m freestyle	24.82	32	did not advance			
Adam Viktora	50 m butterfly	26.76	39	did not advance			

== Weightlifting ==
Seychelles was given a quota to compete in a girls' event by the tripartite committee.

Girls

Athlete	Event	Snatch		Clean & jerk		Total	Rank
Athlete	Event	Result	Rank	Result	Rank	Total	Rank
Romentha Larue	−58 kg	55	9	65	9	120	9
