= Cayman Islands at the 2010 Summer Youth Olympics =

- IOC code: CAY
- NOC: Cayman Islands Olympic Committee

in Singapore
- Competitors: 3 in 2 sports
- Flag bearer: Seiji Groome
- Medals: Gold 0 Silver 0 Bronze 0 Total 0

Summer Youth Olympics appearances
- 2010; 2014; 2018; 2026

Cayman Islands participated in the 2010 Summer Youth Olympics in Singapore.

The Cayman Islands team consisted of 3 athletes competing in 2 sports: sailing and swimming.

== Sailing ==
One Person Dinghy

Athlete	Event	Race												Points	Rank
Athlete	Event	1	2	3	4	5	6	7	8	9	10	11	M*	Points	Rank
Elizabeth Wauchope	Girls' Byte CII	22	25	21	25	22	~~27~~	18	20	~~DSQ~~	23	26	20	222	25

== Swimming ==
Athletes	Event	Heat		Semifinal		Final	
Athletes	Event	Time	Position	Time	Position	Time	Position
Seiji Groome	Boys' 200m breaststroke	2:36.75	19			Did not advance	
Seiji Groome	Boys' 200m Individual Medley	2:16.84	25			Did not advance	
Lara Butler	Girls' 100m backstroke	1:08.98	33	Did not advance			
Lara Butler	Girls' 100m butterfly	1:07.59	29	Did not advance			
