= Kyrgyzstan at the 2014 Summer Youth Olympics =

- IOC code: KGZ
- NOC: Kyrgyzstan Olympic Committee
- Website: www.olympic.kg

in Nanjing
- Competitors: 7 in 6 sports
- Medals Ranked 70th: Gold 0 Silver 1 Bronze 0 Total 1

Summer Youth Olympics appearances (overview)
- 2010; 2014; 2018

Kyrgyzstan competed at the 2014 Summer Youth Olympics, in Nanjing, China from 16 August to 28 August 2014.

== Medalists ==
Medal	Name	Sport	Event	Date
Silver	Rostsilav Dashkov	Judo	Boys' -100 kg	19 August

== Canoeing ==
Kyrgyzstan qualified one boat based on its performance at the 2013 World Junior Canoe Sprint and Slalom Championships.

Boys

Athlete	Event	Qualification		Repechage		Round of 16		Quarterfinals	Semifinals	Final / BM	Rank
Athlete	Event	Time	Rank	Time	Rank	Time	Rank	Opposition Result	Opposition Result	Opposition Result	Rank
Kirill Bondar	K1 slalom	DSQ		did not advance							
Kirill Bondar	K1 sprint	1:42.321	11 R	1:42.970	3 Q	1:42.938	12	did not advance			

== Equestrian ==
Kyrgyzstan qualified a rider.

Athlete	Horse	Event	Round 1		Round 2			Total	
Athlete	Horse	Event	Penalties	Rank	Penalties	Total	Rank	Penalties	Rank
Igor Kozubaev	Fever	Individual Jumping	16	26	DNS	did not finish			
Asia; Li Yaofeng (CHN); Sayaka Fujiwara (JPN); Igor Kozubaev (KGZ); Hamad Al Qadi (QAT); Hisham Alsuwayni (KSA)	Uriah; Lasino; Fever; Fernando; Quick Sylver	Team Jumping	12; ~~13~~; ~~13~~; 0; 8	6	~~8~~; 0; ~~EL~~; 4; 4	28	6	28	6

== Judo ==
Kyrgyzstan qualified one athlete based on its performance at the 2013 Cadet World Judo Championships.

Individual

Athlete	Event	Semifinals	Final / BM	Rank
Athlete	Event	Opposition Result	Opposition Result	Rank
Rostsilav Dashkov	Boys' -100 kg	G Basile (ARG); W 1000 – 0000	R Safaviyeh (IRI); L 0002 – 1002	2nd place, silver medalist(s)

Team

Athletes	Event	Round of 16	Quarterfinals	Semifinals	Final	Rank
Athletes	Event	Opposition Result	Opposition Result	Opposition Result	Opposition Result	Rank
Team Tani; Francesco Aufieri (MLT); Rostislav Dashkov (KGZ); Luis Gonzalez (VEN); Natig Gurbanli (AZE); Ulyana Minenkova (BLR); Khulan Tseregbaatar (MGL); Hassiatou Yahaya Aboubacar (NIG)	Mixed Team	Team Xian (MIX); L 0 – 7	did not advance			9

== Modern Pentathlon ==
Kyrgyzstan qualified one athlete based on its performance at the Asian and Oceania YOG Qualifiers and another based on the 1 June 2014 Olympic Youth A Pentathlon World Rankings.

Athlete	Event	Fencing Ranking Round (épée one touch)		Swimming (200 m freestyle)			Fencing Final Round (épée one touch)			Combined: Shooting/Running (10 m air pistol)/(3000 m)			Total Points	Final Rank
Athlete	Event	Results	Rank	Time	Rank	Points	Results	Rank	Points	Time	Rank	Points	Total Points	Final Rank
Radion Khripchenko	Boys' Individual	12 – 11	12	2:22.42	23	273	3 – 1	8	270	12:55.42	17	525	1068	19
Valerya Uvarova	Girls' Individual	7 – 16	19	2:24.16	16	268	0 – 1	20	210	14:20.74	16	440	918	19
Adelina Ibatullina (RUS); Radion Khripchenko (KGZ)	Mixed Relay	23 – 23	11	2:06.10	20	322	1 – 1	11	270	12:11.28	5	569	1161	7
Valerya Uvarova (KGZ); Gustav Gustenau (AUT)	Mixed Relay	21 – 25	17	2:03.41	14	330	0 – 1	18	252	13:03.85	21	517	1099	21

== Shooting ==
Kyrgyzstan was given a wild card to compete.

Individual

Athlete	Event	Qualification		Final	
Athlete	Event	Points	Rank	Points	Rank
Dmitrii Gutnik	Boys' 10m Air Pistol	541	17	did not advance	

Team

Athletes	Event	Qualification		Round of 16	Quarterfinals	Semifinals	Final / BM	Rank
Athletes	Event	Points	Rank	Opposition Result	Opposition Result	Opposition Result	Opposition Result	Rank
Anna Korakaki (GRE); Dmitrii Gutnik (KGZ)	Mixed Team 10m Air Pistol	724	18	did not advance				

== Weightlifting ==
Kyrgyzstan qualified 1 quota in the boys' events based on the team ranking after the 2014 Weightlifting Youth & Junior Asian Championships.

Boys

Athlete	Event	Snatch		Clean & jerk		Total	Rank
Athlete	Event	Result	Rank	Result	Rank	Total	Rank
Kursant Tolonov	−77 kg	125	6	155	6	280	6
