= Cayman Islands at the 2014 Summer Youth Olympics =

- IOC code: CAY
- NOC: Cayman Islands Olympic Committee

in Nanjing
- Competitors: 5 in 4 sports
- Medals: Gold 0 Silver 0 Bronze 0 Total 0

Summer Youth Olympics appearances
- 2010; 2014; 2018; 2026

Cayman Islands competed at the 2014 Summer Youth Olympics, in Nanjing, China from 16 August to 28 August 2014.

== Medalists ==
Medals awarded to participants of mixed-NOC (Combined) teams are represented in italics. These medals are not counted towards the individual NOC medal tally.

Medal	Name	Sport	Event	Date
Bronze	Polly Serpell	Equestrian	Team Jumping	20 August

== Athletics ==
Cayman Islands qualified two athletes.

Qualification Legend: Q=Final A (medal); qB=Final B (non-medal); qC=Final C (non-medal); qD=Final D (non-medal); qE=Final E (non-medal)

Girls
Track & road events

Athlete	Event	Heats		Final	
Athlete	Event	Result	Rank	Result	Rank
Pearl Morgan	200 m	26.98	18 qC	27.32	18

== Equestrian ==
Cayman Islands qualified a rider.

Athlete	Horse	Event	Round 1		Round 2			Total	
Athlete	Horse	Event	Penalties	Rank	Penalties	Total	Rank	Penalties	Rank
Polly Serpell	Giorgio Zan	Individual Jumping	12	22	4	16	15	16	15
North America; Polly Serpell (CAY); María Brugal (DOM); Macarena Chiriboga Granja (ECU); Sabrina Rivera Meza (ESA); Stefanie Brand (GUA)	Giorgio Zan; Famoso; Brigand; Con-Zero; Chica	Team Jumping	4; 4; ~~8~~; ~~8~~; 0	3	0; ~~8~~; 0; 0; ~~4~~	8	3	8	3rd place, bronze medalist(s)

== Gymnastics ==
=== Artistic Gymnastics ===
Cayman Islands qualified one athlete based on its performance at the 2014 Junior Pan American Artistic Gymnastics Championships.

Girls

Athlete	Event	Apparatus				Total	Rank
Athlete	Event	F	V	UB	BB	Total	Rank
Morgan Lloyd	Qualification	11.300	11.700	7.900	10.350	41.250	37

== Sailing ==
Cayman Islands qualified two boats based on its performance at the Byte CII North American & Caribbean Continental Qualifier.

Athlete	Event	Race											Net Points	Final Rank
Athlete	Event	1	2	3	4	5	6	7	8	9	10	M*	Net Points	Final Rank
Pablo Bertran	Boys' Byte CII	18	~~27~~	19	22	23	15	2	CAN			18	101	17
Florence Allan	Girls' Byte CII	8	24	25	17	13	16	~~DNF~~; ~~31~~	CAN			19	122	22
