= Mathys Goosen =

Dutch swimmer (born 1996)

Personal information
- Born: 18 May 1996 (age 30)

Sport
- Sport: Swimming
Medal record
Men's swimming
Representing Netherlands
Summer Youth Olympics
Bronze medal – third place	2014 Nanjing	50 m butterfly

Mathys Goosen (born 18 May 1996) is a Dutch swimmer. He competed in the men's 50 metre butterfly event at the 2017 World Aquatics Championships. In 2014, he represented Netherlands at the 2014 Summer Youth Olympics held in Nanjing, China and he won the bronze medal in the boys' 50 metre butterfly event.
