= Netherlands at the 2014 Summer Youth Olympics =

- IOC code: NED
- NOC: NOC*NSF
- Website: www.nocnsf.nl

in Nanjing
- Competitors: 41 in 13 sports
- Medals Ranked 38th: Gold 1 Silver 4 Bronze 5 Total 10

Summer Youth Olympics appearances
- 2010; 2014; 2018; 2026

Netherlands competed at the 2014 Summer Youth Olympics, in Nanjing, China from 16 August to 28 August 2014.

== Archery ==
Netherlands qualified a male archer from its performance at the 2013 World Archery Youth Championships.

Individual

Athlete	Event	Ranking round		Round of 32	Round of 16	Quarterfinals	Semifinals	Final / BM	Rank
Athlete	Event	Score	Seed	Opposition Score	Opposition Score	Opposition Score	Opposition Score	Opposition Score	Rank
Jan van Tongeren	Boys' Individual	682	4	El Ghrari (LBA) (29); W 6–2	Rodriguez Sas (ARG); W 6–2	Gazoz (TUR); L 2–6	Did not advance		5

Team

Athletes	Event	Ranking round		Round of 32	Round of 16	Quarterfinals	Semifinals	Final / BM	Rank
Athletes	Event	Score	Seed	Opposition Score	Opposition Score	Opposition Score	Opposition Score	Opposition Score	Rank
Anisa Zamirova (TJK); Jan van Tongeren (NED)	Mixed Team	1281	19	Pitman (GBR); Dubrova (BLR) (14); L 3–5	Did not advance				17

== Badminton ==
Netherlands qualified two athletes based on the 2 May 2014 BWF Junior World Rankings.

Singles

Athlete	Event	Group stage				Quarterfinal	Semifinal	Final / BM	Rank
Athlete	Event	Opposition Score	Opposition Score	Opposition Score	Rank	Opposition Score	Opposition Score	Opposition Score	Rank
Alex Vlaar	Boys' Singles	Citron (FRA); L 16–21, 20-22	Krapež (SLO); L 21–14, 14–21, 19-1	Weisskirchen (GER); L 17–21, 12-21	4	Did not advance			
Alida Chen	Girls' Singles	Courtois (FRA); W 18–21, 21–14, 21-15	Ishaak (SUR); W 21–6, 21-4	Ongbamrungphan (THA); L 6-21, 8-21	2	Did not advance			

Doubles

Athlete	Event	Group stage				Quarterfinal	Semifinal	Final / BM	Rank
Athlete	Event	Opposition Score	Opposition Score	Opposition Score	Rank	Opposition Score	Opposition Score	Opposition Score	Rank
Janine Lais (AUT); Alex Vlaar (NED)	Mixed Doubles	Lesnaya (UKR); Coelho (BRA); W 21–11, 21-19	Lai (AUS); Shi (CHN); L 16–21, 16-21	Hany (EGY); Seo (KOR); L 16–21, 16-21	2	Did not advance			
Alida Chen (NED); Andraž Krapež (SLO)	Mixed Doubles	Mitsova (BUL); Abdelhakim (EGY); W 21–13, 21-10	Kabelo (BOT); Joshi (IND); W 21–13, 17–21, 21-13	Yamaguchi (JPN); Sarsiekienov (UKR); W 21–19, 21-17	1 Q	Qin (CHN); Narongrit (THA); L 9-21, 20-22	Did not advance		

== Basketball ==
Netherlands qualified a girls' team based on the 1 June 2014 FIBA 3x3 National Federation Rankings.

Skills Competition

Athlete	Event	Qualification			Final		
Athlete	Event	Points	Time	Rank	Points	Time	Rank
Esther Fokke	Girls' Shoot-out Contest	8	21.2	1 Q	3	29.8	4
Fleur Kuijt	Girls' Shoot-out Contest	2	21.9	48	Did not advance		

=== Girls' tournament ===
Roster

- Esther Fokke
- Janis Janis Ndiba
- Fleur Kuijt
- Charlotte van Kleef

Group Stage

Pos	Team	Pld	W	D	L	PF	PA	PD	Pts	Qualification
1	Netherlands	9	8	0	1	164	87	+77	24	Round of 16
2	Hungary	9	8	0	1	146	91	+55	24	Round of 16
3	Spain	9	7	0	2	151	95	+56	21	Round of 16
4	Estonia	9	5	0	4	130	109	+21	15	Round of 16
5	China	9	5	0	4	128	103	+25	15	Round of 16
6	Germany	9	4	0	5	111	133	−22	12	Round of 16
7	Brazil	9	3	0	6	101	123	−22	9	Round of 16
8	Venezuela	9	2	0	7	101	153	−52	6	Round of 16
9	Slovenia	9	2	0	7	120	156	−36	6	Eliminated
10	Syria	9	1	0	8	68	170	−102	3	Eliminated

18 August 2014
20:00

Netherlands	7–13	China

Wutaishan Sports Center, Nanjing

19 August 2014
17:20

Estonia	12–21	Netherlands

Wutaishan Sports Center, Nanjing

19 August 2014
20:20

Netherlands	22–9	Venezuela

Wutaishan Sports Center, Nanjing

20 August 2014
18:40

Syria	4–21	Netherlands

Wutaishan Sports Center, Nanjing

22 August 2014
17:40

Netherlands	18–8	Hungary

Wutaishan Sports Center, Nanjing

22 August 2014
21:20

Spain	12–13	Netherlands

Wutaishan Sports Center, Nanjing

23 August 2014
19:00

Netherlands	20–10	Germany

Wutaishan Sports Center, Nanjing

24 August 2014
18:20

Brazil	6–21	Netherlands

Wutaishan Sports Center, Nanjing

24 August 2014
21:00

Netherlands	vs.	Slovenia

Wutaishan Sports Center, Nanjing

Knockout Stage

Round of 16	Quarterfinals	Semifinals	Final	Rank
Opposition Score	Opposition Score	Opposition Score	Opposition Score	Rank
Guam; W 17-1	China; W 21-13	Spain; W 11-7	United States; L 10-19	2nd place, silver medalist(s)

== Cycling ==
Netherlands qualified a boys' and girls' team based on its ranking issued by the UCI.

Team

Athletes	Event	Cross-Country Eliminator		Time Trial			BMX		Cross-Country Race			Road Race			Total Pts	Rank
Athletes	Event	Rank	Points	Time	Rank	Points	Rank	Points	Time	Rank	Points	Time	Rank	Points	Total Pts	Rank
Niek Kimmann; Wiebe Scholten	Boys' Team	5	40	5:24.13	17	0	1	200	1:00:10	12	6	1:54:42; 1:37:23	54; 10	10	256	3rd place, bronze medalist(s)
Lotte Eikelenboom; Viviana van Hees	Girls' Team	Did not start		6:23.62	19	0	2	160	50:28	16	1	1:21:31; DNF	42; DNF	0	161	5

Mixed Relay

Athletes	Event	Cross-Country Girls' Race	Cross-Country Boys' Race	Boys' Road Race	Girls' Road Race	Total Time	Rank
Viviana van Hees; Niek Kimmann; Wiebe Scholten; Lotte Eikelenboom	Mixed Team Relay						

== Equestrian ==
Netherlands qualified a rider.

Athlete	Horse	Event	Round 1		Round 2			Total	
Athlete	Horse	Event	Penalties	Rank	Penalties	Total	Rank	Penalties	Rank
Lisa Nooren	For The Sun	Individual Jumping							
Europe; Jake Saywell (GBR); Michael Duffy (IRL); Matias Alvaro (ITA); Lisa Nooren (NED); Filip Agren (SWE)	Galaxy; Commander; Montelini; For The Sun; Abel	Team Jumping	(8); 0; 0 (8); 0 (0); 0; 0 (0); 0	1	(4); 0; 0 (0); 0 (0); 0; 0 (0); 0		1	0	1st place, gold medalist(s)

== Field hockey ==
Netherlands qualified a girls' team based on its performance at the 2013 Youth European Championship.

=== Girls' tournament ===
Roster

- Karlijn Adank
- Michelle Fillet
- Kyra Fortuin
- Maxime Kerstholt
- Frederique Matla
- Elin van Erk
- Marijn Veen
- Carmen Wijsman
- Ginella Zerbo

Group Stage

Pos	Team	Pld	W	D	L	GF	GA	GD	Pts	Qualification
1	Netherlands	4	4	0	0	46	1	+45	12	Quarterfinals
2	Japan	4	2	1	1	42	16	+26	7	Quarterfinals
3	Argentina	4	2	1	1	34	9	+25	7	Quarterfinals
4	South Africa	4	1	0	3	8	34	−26	3	Quarterfinals
5	Fiji	4	0	0	4	3	73	−70	0	

Source: FIH
Rules for classification: 1) points; 2) goal difference; 3) goals scored; 4) head-to-head result.

18 August 2014
16:00

Netherlands	17–0	Fiji
Veen 1'; Fortuin 2', 34'; Matla 7', 22', 27'; Wijsman 8'; Van Erk 9', 26'; Kerstholt 13', 16', 30', 34'; Fillet 19', 21', 32'; Zerbo 31'	Report

Umpires:
Liu Lijie (CHN)
Emily Carroll (AUS)

19 August 2014
16:30

Japan	1–12	Netherlands
Mori 24'	Report	Fillet 5', 8', 13'; Veen 12', 20', 21'; Matla 12', 24'; Wijsman 17', 28'; Kerstholt 23', 35'

Umpires:
Ivona Makar (CRO)
Ana Escalante (MEX)

20 August 2014
16:00

Argentina	0–6	Netherlands
	Report	Veen 12', 26'; Van Erk 16'; Fillet 28'; Wijsman 30'; Matla 32'

Umpires:
Denise Pelletier (CAN)
Tanja Schafer (RSA)

21 August 2014
18:00

Netherlands	11–0	South Africa
Veen 8', 35'; Zerbo 9', 10'; Kerstholt 12', 26', 28', 35'; Van Erk 17'; Fortuin 22'; Wijsman 25'	Report

Umpires:
Emily Carroll (AUS)
Ana Escalante (MEX)

Quarterfinal

23 August 2014
16:00

Netherlands	8–1	Germany
Matla 11', 20'; Veen 13', 30'; Kerstholt 18', 27'; Fillet 29', 35'	Report	Hohenhovel 1'

Umpires:
Liu Lijie (CHN)
Tanja Schafer (RSA)

Semifinal

24 August 2014
18:00

Netherlands	4–2	Argentina
Kerstholt 20', 35'; Van Erk 22'; Veen 34'	Report	Jankunas 11', 31'

Umpires:
Tanja Schafer (RSA)
Ivona Makar (CRO)

Gold medal match

26 August 2014
20:30

Netherlands (silver)	5–5	China
Zerbo 20'; Kerstholt 22'; Van Erk 25'; Veen 26'; Matla 28'	Report	Zhang Jinrong 2', 16'; Zhang Lijia 4'; Tu Yidan 8'; Zhang Xindan 29'
Penalties
Matla (penalty shoot-out scored); Wijsman (penalty shoot-out missed); Veen (penalty shoot-out scored)	2–3	(penalty shoot-out scored) Zhang Lijia; (penalty shoot-out scored) Li Hong; (penalty shoot-out scored) Zhang Jinrong

Umpires:
Ana Faias (POR)
Tanja Schafer (RSA)

== Golf ==
Netherlands qualified one team of two athletes based on the 8 June 2014 IGF Combined World Amateur Golf Rankings.

Individual

Athlete	Event	Round 1		Round 2			Round 3			Total	
Athlete	Event	Score	Rank	Score	Total	Rank	Score	Total	Rank	Score	Rank
Lars Keunen	Boys	73	19	73	146	20	71	217	16	217	16
Marit Harryvan	Girls	71	7	75	146	11	18	224	18	224	18

Team

Athletes	Event	Round 1 (Foursome)		Round 2 (Fourball)			Round 3 (Individual Stroke)				Total	
Athletes	Event	Score	Rank	Score	Total	Rank	Boy	Girl	Total	Rank	Score	Rank
Lars Keunen; Marit Harryvan	Mixed											

== Gymnastics ==
=== Artistic gymnastics ===
Netherlands qualified one athlete based on its performance at the 2014 European WAG Championships.

Girls

Athlete	Event	Qualification						Final					
Athlete	Event	Apparatus				Total	Rank	Apparatus				Total	Rank
Athlete	Event	F	V	UB	BB	Total	Rank	F	V	UB	BB	Total	Rank
Isa Maassen	All-around	11.550	12.500	11.000	12.050	47.100	25	Did not advance					

== Judo ==
Netherlands qualified two athletes based on its performance at the 2013 Cadet World Judo Championships.

Individual

Athlete	Event	Round of 32	Round of 16	Quarterfinals	Semifinals	Rep 1	Rep 2	Rep 3	Rep 4	Final / BM	Rank
Athlete	Event	Opposition Result	Opposition Result	Opposition Result	Opposition Result	Opposition Result	Opposition Result	Opposition Result	Opposition Result	Opposition Result	Rank
Frank de Wit	Boys' -81 kg	Bye	Lo (TPE); W 100-000S1	Silva Morales (CUB); W 010S1-001S2	Kirakozashvili (GEO); L 000-100	Bye				Milic (MNE); W 100-000	3rd place, bronze medalist(s)
Lisa Mullenberg	Girls' -63 kg	Bye	Yahaya Aboubacar (NIG); W 100-000	Polleres (AUT); W 100-000	Gercsak (HUN); L 000-100					Schwille (GER); L 000-100	5

Team

Athletes	Event	Round of 16	Quarterfinals	Semifinals	Final	Rank
Athletes	Event	Opposition Result	Opposition Result	Opposition Result	Opposition Result	Rank
Team Yamashita; Frank de Wit (NED); Nellie Einstein (SWE); Sandrine Mbazoghe Endamne (GAB); Lubjana Piovesana (GBR); Sara Rodriguez (ESP); Tsogtbaatar Tsend-Ochir (MGL); Jorre Verstraeten (BEL)	Mixed Team	Team Douillet (MIX); L 3^{112} – 3^{200}	Did not advance			9
Team Rouge; Morgane Duchene (FRA); Ayelén Elizeche (ARG); Adrian Gandia (PUR); Mikhail Igolnikov (RUS); Lisa Millenberg (NED); Maria Siderot (POR); Sukhrob Tursunov (UZB)	Mixed Team	Team Kano (MIX); W 5-2	Team Ruska (MIX); W 5-2	Team Xian (MIX); W 4-3	Team Geesink (MIX); W 4-2	1st place, gold medalist(s)

== Sailing ==
Netherlands qualified one boat based on its performance at the 2013 World Byte CII Championships. Later Netherlands qualified one boat based on its performance at the Byte CII European Continental Qualifiers and two boats from the Techno 293 European Continental Qualifiers.

Athlete	Event	Race											Net Points	Final Rank
Athlete	Event	1	2	3	4	5	6	7	8	9	10	M*	Net Points	Final Rank
Scipio Houtman	Boys' Byte CII	8	18	22	12	25	(26)	21	16	Cancelled		148.00	122.00	21
Lars van Someren	Boys' Techno 293	1	4	(10)	9	3	2	4	Cancelled			33.00	23.00	3rd place, bronze medalist(s)
Odile van Aanholt	Girls' Byte CII	6	3	1	1	(8)	8	2	7	Cancelled		36.00	28.00	2nd place, silver medalist(s)
Aimée van 't Hoff	Girls' Techno 293	3	6	6	4	3	(8)	5	Cancelled			35.00	27.00	4

== Swimming ==
Netherlands qualified seven swimmers.

Boys

Athlete	Event	Heat		Semifinal		Final	
Athlete	Event	Time	Rank	Time	Rank	Time	Rank
Kyle Stolk	100 m freestyle	50.52	6 Q	49.78	2 Q	49.83	5
Kyle Stolk	200 m freestyle	1:50.32	2 Q	—N/a		1:48.59	2nd place, silver medalist(s)
Laurent Bams	50 m backstroke	26.21	8 Q	25.84	6 Q	25.61	4
Laurent Bams	100 m backstroke	56.47	11 Q	56.03	11	Did not advance	
Mathys Goosen	50 m butterfly	24.69	7 Q	24.29	4 Q	24.13	3rd place, bronze medalist(s)
Mathys Goosen	100 m butterfly	54.34	6 Q	53.84	5 Q	53.64	5

Girls

Athlete	Event	Heat		Semifinal		Final	
Athlete	Event	Time	Rank	Time	Rank	Time	Rank
Maaike de Waard	50 m freestyle	Did not start		Did not advance			
Maaike de Waard	50 m backstroke	29.03	3 Q	28.88	3 Q	28.36	1st place, gold medalist(s)
Maaike de Waard	100 m backstroke	1:02.33	5 Q	1:02.34	8 Q	1:01.56	5
Maaike de Waard	50 m butterfly	27.10	5 Q	27.18	9	Did not advance	
Kim Busch	50 m freestyle	26.32	12 Q	26.00	10	Did not advance	
Kim Busch	50 m butterfly	27.61	13 Q	27.65	13	Did not advance	
Esmee Bos	50 m backstroke	30.37	26	Did not advance			
Esmee Bos	200 m individual medley	2:19.43	12	—N/a		Did not advance	
Robin Neumann	100 m backstroke	1:04.84	22	Did not advance			
Robin Neumann	200 m backstroke	2:17.15	12	—N/a		Did not advance	
Esmee Bos; Kim Busch; Maaike de Waard; Robin Neumann	4 × 100 m freestyle relay	3:49.98	4 Q	—N/a		3:45.92	4

Mixed

Athlete	Event	Heat		Final	
Athlete	Event	Time	Rank	Time	Rank
Laurent Bams; Kim Busch; Robin Neumann; Kyle Stolk	4 × 100 m freestyle relay	3:34.43	3 Q	3:33.19	5
Maaike de Waard; Mathys Goosen; Robin Neumann; Kyle Stolk	4 × 100 m medley relay	4:02.16	12	Did not advance	

== Taekwondo ==
Netherlands qualified three athletes based on its performance at the Taekwondo Qualification Tournament.

Boys

Athlete	Event	Round of 16	Quarterfinals	Semifinals	Final	Rank
Athlete	Event	Opposition Result	Opposition Result	Opposition Result	Opposition Result	Rank
Machario Patti	−48 kg	Serikbay (KAZ); L 8–9	Did not advance			9
Fahd Zaouia	−55 kg	El Mokhtar (MTN); W 26(PTG)–5	Huang (TPE); L 1–14(PTG)	Did not advance		5
Nabil Ennadiri	−63 kg	Bye	Getrouw (SUR); W 21(PTG)–9	Nava Rodriguez (MEX); L 4–11	Did not advance	3rd place, bronze medalist(s)

== Triathlon ==
Netherlands qualified one athlete based on its performance at the 2014 European Youth Olympic Games Qualifier.

Individual

Athlete	Event	Swim (750m)	Trans 1	Bike (20 km)	Trans 2	Run (5 km)	Total Time	Rank
Kirsten Nuyes	Girls	10:30	0:47	31:18	0:28	18:27	1:01:30	6

Relay

Athlete	Event	Total Times per Athlete (Swim 250m, Bike 6.6 km, Run 1.8 km)	Total Group Time	Rank
Europe 2 Elizaveta Zhizhina (RUS); Alberto Gonzalez Garcia (ESP); Kirsten Nuyens (NED); Peer Sonksen (GER)	Mixed Relay	21:39; 19:33; 23:12; 19:51	1:24:15	5
