= Nanjing International Exhibition Center =

Building in Nanjing, China

Coordinates: 32°4′28.1″N 118°48′32.63″E

- 南京国际展览中心
- Interactive map of Nanjing International Exhibition Center
- Address: Xuanwu District
- Location: Nanjing, Jiangsu, China

The Nanjing International Exhibition Center (Chinese: 南京国际展览中心) is located in the Xuanwu District of Nanjing, China.

Each year the National Travel Expo is held at the center by the China National Tourism Administration. It will be used as a venue for equestrian competitions for the 2014 Summer Youth Olympics in Nanjing.

== Transportation ==
The center is accessible within walking distance south east of Nanjing Railway Station. The center is also accessible by taking Line 3, Nanjing Metro and dropping of at Nanjing Forestry University-Xinzhuang Station

== See also ==
- List of convention and exhibition centers in China
