= Cayman Prep and High School =

Private school in the Cayman Islands

Address
- Primary: 242 Smith Road Grand Cayman KY1-1001 Cayman Islands; Secondary: 559 Walkers Road Grand Cayman KY1-1001 Cayman Islands

Information
- School type: Private
- Opened: 1949
- Website: cayprep.edu.ky

Cayman Prep and High School (CPHS) is a private school serving kindergarten through year 13 located in George Town, Grand Cayman, Cayman Islands, operated and owned by the United Church in Jamaica and the Cayman Islands. CPHS follows the National Curriculum of England.

== History ==
CPHS was established in 1949 and the first teachers were all members of the Presbyterian/United Church. The school originally opened on land behind the George Town Library, in buildings repurposed from a former U.S. Navy World War II base.

Its high school programme began in 1997, and that year its current primary school on Smith Road opened. There are separate campuses for primary and high school in George Town. Each campus includes a playing field, assembly hall, library, and dedicated facilities for specialized subjects, such as information and communication technology (ICT). The high school also features fully equipped science laboratories.

The board of governors and the school's chairman are appointed by the church's board.
