= Lucas Decicilia =

Argentine sport shooter

Lucas Agustín Decicilia
Personal information
- Nationality: Argentina
- Born: 11 May 1998 (age 27); Ensenada, Argentina

Sport
- Sport: Shooting
- Event: 10 m air rifle (AR60)

Lucas Agustín Decicilia (born May 11, 1998 in Argentina) is an Argentinian sport shooter. He won the Men's 10m Air Rifle event at 2014 ISSF World Cup, Fort Benning, thus earning a quota to participate in the 2014 Youth Olympic Games.
