= Sascha Subarsky =

Austrian swimmer

Personal information
- Nationality: Austrian
- Born: 28 February 1996 (age 30)

Sport
- Sport: Swimming

Sascha Subarsky (born 28 February 1996) is an Austrian swimmer. He placed 34th in the men's 100 metre butterfly event at the 2018 FINA World Swimming Championships (25 m) in Hangzhou, China.
