= Sailing at the 2014 Summer Youth Olympics – Girls' Techno 293 =

Girls' Techno 293 at the II Summer Youth Olympic Games
- Venue: Jinniu Lake
- Dates: August 18–23, 2014
- Competitors: 30 from 30 nations

Medalists
1st place, gold medalist(s)		Linli Wu	China
2nd place, silver medalist(s)		Mariam Sekhposyan	Russia
3rd place, bronze medalist(s)		Lucie Pianazza	France

Girls' Techno 293 class competition at the 2014 Summer Youth Olympics in Nanjing took place from August 18 to August 23 at Jinniu Lake. 21 sailors competed in this Techno 293 competition.

Seven races were scheduled.

== Medalists ==
Gold	Linli Wu; China
Silver	Mariam Sekhposyan; Russia
Bronze	Lucie Pianazza; France

== Results ==
- TECHNO 293 (WOMEN) OVERALL RESULTS

=== Notes ===
Scoring abbreviations are defined as follows:

- OCS – On the Course Side of the starting line
- DSQ – Disqualified
- DNF – Did Not Finish
- DNS – Did Not Start
- BFD – Black Flag Disqualification
- RAF – Retired after Finishing
