= Sasha Nievas =

Argentine weightlifter (born 1998)

Personal information
- Full name: Sasha Belen Beatriz Nievas
- Born: 4 June 1998 (age 28)
- Weight: 57.02 kg (125.7 lb)

Sport
- Country: Argentina
- Sport: Weightlifting
- Weight class: 58 kg
- Team: National team
- Updated on 9 November 2016

Sasha Belen Beatriz Nievas (born 4 June 1998) is an Argentine weightlifter and Crossfit Athlete, who represents Argentina at international competitions.

She won the bronze medal in the 58 kg category at the 2014 Summer Youth Olympics.

== Crossfit ==
Sasha competed in her first Crossfit Open in 2018, finishing 487th worldwide and 5th in Argentina, earning a spot in the Latin America Regional. She finished 24th in that Regional Event.

In 2019, she finished again competed in the Crossfit Open, finishing 635th worldwide and 6th in Argentina. In the first year of a new format, Sasha competed at the Brazil Crossfit Championship, a new Crossfit Sanctional Event. She finished 9th at the event, failing to earn a spot to the 2019 Crossfit Games.

In 2020, Sasha finished 36th worldwide and 2nd in Argentina in the Crossfit Open. She scored the top time for Open Workout 20.4, with a time of 11:08. Her placing of 36th worldwide was initially enough to secure her a place in the 2020 Crossfit Games. Sasha competed at the 2020 Brazil Crossfit Championship, but did not finish. With the changes to the qualification rules due to the COVID-19 pandemic, Sasha's placing did not get to compete at the Games.

In 2021, Sasha improved, finishing 25th worldwide and 1st in Argentina in the Crossfit Open. This placing earned her a spot in the Online Individual Quarterfinals, where she finished 3rd overall, winning Workout 2 in the new five workout format. This placing earned her a spot at the 2021 Brazil Crossfit Championship, the South America region's Crossfit Semifinal Competition. This competition was conducted online due to COVID-19 restrictions. She finished 2nd overall, winning Workout 4 and earning the second of two spots from this competition at the 2021 Crossfit Games. Sasha finished 31st at the Games, getting cut after the ninth event at the end of Day 2. Her best finish of the competition was 11th in event 8.

== Major results ==
| Year | Venue | Weight | Snatch (kg) | | | | Clean & Jerk (kg) | | | | Total | Rank |
| Year | Venue | Weight | 1 | 2 | 3 | Rank | 1 | 2 | 3 | Rank | Total | Rank |
Summer Youth Olympics
| 2014 | Nanjing, China | 58 kg | *75 | 75 | 78 | --- | 95 | 100 | ~~102~~ | --- | 178 | 3rd place, bronze medalist(s) |
