= Aleksandr Sadovnikov =

Russian swimmer

Personal information
- National team: Russia
- Born: 21 September 1996 (age 29) Volgograd, Russia

Sport
- Sport: Swimming
- Strokes: Butterfly
Medal record
Men's swimming
Representing Russia
European Championships (LC)
Silver medal – second place	2018 Glasgow	4×100 m medley
European Championships (SC)
Gold medal – first place	2017 Copenhagen	4×50 m medley
Summer Universiade
Silver medal – second place	2015 Gwangju	4x100 m medley
Gold medal – first place	2017 Taipei	100 m butterfly
Silver medal – second place	2017 Taipei	4x100 m medley
Silver medal – second place	2019 Naples	4x100 m medley
Youth Olympic Games
Gold medal – first place	2014 Nanjing	4×100 m medley
Silver medal – second place	2014 Nanjing	100 m butterfly
Silver medal – second place	2014 Nanjing	4×100 m mixed medley
European Junior Championships
Gold medal – first place	2014 Dordrecht	100 m butterfly
Gold medal – first place	2014 Dordrecht	4×100 m medley
Silver medal – second place	2014 Dordrecht	50 m butterfly

Aleksandr Sergeyevich Sadovnikov (Russian: Александр Сергеевич Садовников; born 21 September 1996) is a Russian competitive swimmer who specializes in butterfly.

He qualified for the 2016 Summer Olympics in Rio de Janeiro in the 100 meter butterfly, where he finished 8th in the final with a time of 51.84, just 0.70 seconds off of a bronze medal.
