= Swimming at the 2014 Summer Youth Olympics – Boys' 4 × 100 metre freestyle relay =

Boys' 4 × 100 metre freestyle relay at the 2014 Summer Youth Olympics
- Venue: Nanjing Olympic Sports Centre
- Dates: 19 August
- Competitors: 44 from 11 nations
- Winning time: 3:21.19

Medalists
gold medal	Duncan Scott; Miles Munro; Martyn Walton; Luke Greenbank	Great Britain
silver medal	Alessandro Bori; Giacomo Carini; Simone Sabbioni; Nicolangelo Di Fabio	Italy
bronze medal	Marek Ulrich; Maximilian Pilger; Damian Wierling; Alexander Kunert	Germany

The boys' 4 × 100 metre freestyle relay event in swimming at the 2014 Summer Youth Olympics took place on 19 August at the Nanjing Olympic Sports Centre in Nanjing, China.

== Results ==
=== Heats ===
The heats were held at 10:52.

Rank	Heat	Lane	Name	Nationality	Time	Notes
1	2	2	Filipp Shopin (50.58); Evgeny Rylov (50.67); Aleksandr Sadovnikov (51.05); Anton Chupkov (52.65)	Russia	3:24.95	Q
2	2	3	Alessandro Bori (50.12); Nicolangelo Di Fabio (50.58); Giacomo Carini (51.37); Simone Sabbioni (52.91)	Italy	3:24.98	Q
3	2	5	Marek Ulrich (52.02); Maximilian Pilger (52.88); Damian Wierling (49.66); Alexander Kunert (50.77)	Germany	3:25.33	Q
4	1	5	Duncan Scott (50.81); Miles Munro (52.17); Martyn Walton (50.89); Luke Greenbank (52.50)	Great Britain	3:26.37	Q
5	2	7	Juan Marín (51.86); Gonzalo Carazo (51.13); Marc Vivas (52.37); Guillermo Sánchez (52.25)	Spain	3:27.61	Q
6	2	4	Kyle Chalmers (50.78); Grayson Bell (53.04); Nic Groenewald (52.76); Nicholas Brown (51.67)	Australia	3:28.25	Q
7	1	2	Joshua Steyn (51.42); Chris Reid (51.76); Brent Szurdoki (52.78); Jarred Crous (53.28)	South Africa	3:29.24	Q
8	1	7	Patrick Conaton (52.13); Justin Wright (53.26); Patrick Ransford (52.96); Patrick Mulcare (51.45)	United States	3:29.80	Q
9	1	4	Jean Dencausse (52.66); Rahiti De Vos (52.62); Geoffroy Mathieu (54.33); Guillaume Laure (52.06)	France	3:31.67	
10	1	3	Yuta Sato (54.60); Ippei Watanabe (50.97); Yudai Amada (53.37); Koki Tsunefuka (53.24)	Japan	3:32.18	
	2	6	Li Guangyuan (51.37); Li Zhuhao; Zhang Zhihao; Yu Hexin	China	DSQ	
	1	6		South Korea	DNS	

=== Final ===
The final was held at 19:19.

Rank	Lane	Name	Nationality	Time	Notes
1st place, gold medalist(s)	6	Duncan Scott (49.67); Miles Munro (49.83); Martyn Walton (50.18); Luke Greenbank (51.51)	Great Britain	3:21.19	
2nd place, silver medalist(s)	5	Alessandro Bori (49.85); Giacomo Carini (51.65); Simone Sabbioni (50.97); Nicolangelo Di Fabio (49.82)	Italy	3:22.29	
3rd place, bronze medalist(s)	3	Marek Ulrich (51.52); Maximilian Pilger (51.99); Damian Wierling (49.50); Alexander Kunert (49.92)	Germany	3:22.93	
4	4	Evgeny Rylov (50.33); Aleksandr Sadovnikov (51.35); Anton Chupkov (52.77); Filipp Shopin (50.56)	Russia	3:25.01	
5	7	Kyle Chalmers (50.20); Nic Groenewald (52.24); Grayson Bell (52.50); Nicholas Brown (51.56)	Australia	3:26.50	
6	2	Gonzalo Carazo (51.76); Juan Marín (51.03); Guillermo Sánchez (51.99); Marc Vivas (51.96)	Spain	3:26.74	
7	8	Patrick Mulcare (51.54); Justin Wright (53.81); Patrick Ransford (52.02); Patrick Conaton (51.38)	United States	3:28.75	
8	1	Joshua Steyn (51.72); Chris Reid (51.62); Brent Szurdoki (52.44); Jarred Crous (53.08)	South Africa	3:28.86	
