= Swimming at the 2014 Summer Youth Olympics – Boys' 4 × 100 metre medley relay =

Boys' 4 × 100 metre medley relay at the 2014 Summer Youth Olympics
- Venue: Nanjing Olympic Sports Centre
- Dates: 20 August
- Competitors: 36 from 9 nations
- Winning time: 3:38.02

Medalists
gold medal	Evgeny Rylov; Anton Chupkov; Aleksandr Sadovnikov; Filipp Shopin	Russia
silver medal	Marek Ulrich; Maximilian Pilger; Alexander Kunert; Damian Wierling	Germany
bronze medal	Nic Groenewald; Grayson Bell; Nicholas Brown; Kyle Chalmers	Australia

The boys' 4 × 100 metre medley relay event in swimming at the 2014 Summer Youth Olympics took place on 20 August at the Nanjing Olympic Sports Centre in Nanjing, China.

== Results ==
=== Heats ===
The heats were held at 10:48.

Rank	Heat	Lane	Name	Nationality	Time	Notes
1	2	6	Evgeny Rylov (55.16); Anton Chupkov (1:01.54); Aleksandr Sadovnikov (54.23); Filipp Shopin (52.54)	Russia	3:43.47	Q
2	1	5	Marek Ulrich (56.32); Maximilian Pilger (1:02.65); Alexander Kunert (55.21); Damian Wierling (51.37)	Germany	3:45.55	Q
3	1	6	Chris Reid (56.72); Jarred Crous (1:02.35); Joshua Steyn (54.14); Brent Szurdoki (52.76)	South Africa	3:45.97	Q
4	2	4	Nic Groenewald (56.30); Grayson Bell (1:04.78); Nicholas Brown (55.80); Kyle Chalmers (51.21)	Australia	3:48.09	Q
5	2	5	Geoffroy Mathieu (58.70); Jean Dencausse (1:04.29); Guillaume Laure (56.30); Rahiti De Vos (54.21)	France	3:53.50	Q
6	2	3	Koki Tsunefuka (1:00.07); Ippei Watanabe (1:02.30); Yudai Amada (57.00); Yuta Sato (54.21)	Japan	3:53.58	Q
7	2	2	Guillermo Sánchez (1:00.87); Gonzalo Carazo (1:04.52); Juan Marín (56.00); Marc Vivas (53.63)	Spain	3:55.02	Q
8	1	2	Patrick Conaton (57.06); Patrick Mulcare (1:07.72); Justin Wright (57.02); Patrick Ransford (53.27)	United States	3:55.07	Q
	1	3	Li Guangyuan (55.09); Zhang Zhihao (1:03.10); Li Zhuhao; Yu Hexin	China	DSQ	
	1	4		Brazil	DNS	

=== Final ===
The final was held at 19:17.

Rank	Lane	Name	Nationality	Time	Notes
1st place, gold medalist(s)	4	Evgeny Rylov (54.31); Anton Chupkov (1:00.38); Aleksandr Sadovnikov (53.24); Filipp Shopin (50.09)	Russia	3:38.02	WJR
2nd place, silver medalist(s)	5	Marek Ulrich (55.51); Maximilian Pilger (1:01.03); Alexander Kunert (54.07); Damian Wierling (48.69)	Germany	3:39.30	
3rd place, bronze medalist(s)	6	Nic Groenewald (55.98); Grayson Bell (1:02.26); Nicholas Brown (53.35); Kyle Chalmers (49.09)	Australia	3:40.68	
4	3	Chris Reid (55.69); Jarred Crous (1:01.29); Joshua Steyn (53.55); Brent Szurdoki (51.86)	South Africa	3:42.39	
5	2	Geoffroy Mathieu (58.32); Jean Dencausse (1:02.50); Guillaume Laure (55.55); Rahiti De Vos (52.43)	France	3:48.80	
6	1	Guillermo Sánchez (59.06); Gonzalo Carazo (1:03.59); Juan Marín (55.49); Marc Vivas (52.32)	Spain	3:50.46	
7	7	Koki Tsunefuka (59.90); Yuta Sato (1:04.22); Yudai Amada (57.17); Ippei Watanabe (51.31)	Japan	3:52.60	
	8		United States	DNS	
