= South Africa at the 2014 Summer Youth Olympics =

- IOC code: RSA
- NOC: South African Sports Confederation and Olympic Committee

in Nanjing
- Competitors: 54 in 14 sports
- Medals Ranked 49th: Gold 1 Silver 0 Bronze 0 Total 1

Summer Youth Olympics appearances
- 2010; 2014; 2018; 2026

South Africa competed at the 2014 Summer Youth Olympics, in Nanjing, China from 16 August to 28 August 2014.

== Medalists ==
Medal	Name	Sport	Event	Date
Gold	Gezelle Magerman	Athletics	400 m hurdles	25th

== Athletics ==
South Africa qualified seven athletes.

Qualification Legend: Q=Final A (medal); qB=Final B (non-medal); qC=Final C (non-medal); qD=Final D (non-medal); qE=Final E (non-medal)

Boys
Track & road events

Athlete	Event	Heats		Final	
Athlete	Event	Result	Rank	Result	Rank
Ronald Rakaku	100 m	11.72	25 qC	Did not start	

Field Events

Athlete	Event	Qualification		Final	
Athlete	Event	Distance	Rank	Distance	Rank
Jason van Rooyen	Shot put	19.73	4 Q	19.82	4

Girls
Track & road events

Athlete	Event	Heats		Final	
Athlete	Event	Result	Rank	Result	Rank
Taylon Bieldt	100 m hurdles	14.18	13 qB	Did not start	
Gezelle Magerman	400 m hurdles	58.57	1 Q	57.91	1st place, gold medalist(s)

Field events

Athlete	Event	Qualification		Final	
Athlete	Event	Distance	Rank	Distance	Rank
Yolandi Stander	Shot put	14.62	14 qB	14.45	12
Leandri Geel	Discus throw	46.29	7 Q	46.05	6
Jo-Ane van Dyk	Javelin throw	52.60	3 Q	48.93	7

== Canoeing ==
South Africa qualified one boat based on its performance at the 2013 World Junior Canoe Sprint and Slalom Championships.

Girls

Athlete	Event	Qualification		Repechage		Round of 16		Quarterfinals	Semifinals	Final / BM	Rank
Athlete	Event	Time	Rank	Time	Rank	Time	Rank	Opposition Result	Opposition Result	Opposition Result	Rank
Donna Hutton	K1 slalom	1:38.749	15 R	1:34.219	5 Q	1:33.727	13	Did not advance			
Donna Hutton	K1 sprint	1:54.376	6 Q	—N/a		1:54.976	7 Q	Kaltenberger (KAZ); L 1:50.743	Did not advance		5

== Cycling ==
South Africa qualified a boys' and girls' team based on its ranking issued by the UCI.

Team

Athletes	Event	Cross-Country Eliminator		Time Trial			BMX		Cross-Country Race			Road Race			Total Pts	Rank
Athletes	Event	Rank	Points	Time	Rank	Points	Rank	Points	Time	Rank	Points	Time	Rank	Points	Total Pts	Rank
Alex Limberg; Ivan Venter	Boys' Team	18	0	5:20.24	12	6	4	100	1:01:05	13	4	DNF; 1:37:18	1	100	210	6
Relebohile Pebane; Maia Rawlins	Girls' Team	16	1	7:42.32	29	0	4	100	−2 laps	27	0	DNF; 1:28:19	54	0	101	13

Mixed Relay

Athletes	Event	Cross-Country Girls' Race	Cross-Country Boys' Race	Boys' Road Race	Girls' Road Race	Total Time	Rank
Relebohile Pebane; Alex Limberg; Ivan Venter; Maia Rawlins	Mixed Team Relay	4:11	3:40	5:37	7:30	20:58	28

== Equestrian ==
South Africa qualified a rider.

Athlete	Horse	Event	Round 1		Round 2			Total	
Athlete	Horse	Event	Penalties	Rank	Penalties	Total	Rank	Penalties	Rank
Alexa Stais	Dominand	Individual Jumping	16	26	8	24	12	24	21
Africa; Mohamed Hayab (EGY); Lilia Maamar (MAR); Maeva Boyer (SEN); Alexa Stais (RSA); Sophie Teede (ZIM)	White Lady; Figaro; Cornetta; Dominand; Carsar	Team Jumping	12	4	4	16	4	16	4

== Field hockey ==
South Africa qualified a boys' and girls' team based on its performance at the African Qualification Tournament.

=== Boys' tournament ===
Roster

- Jacques Bleeker
- Ryan Crowe
- Tyson Dlungwana
- Tevin Kok
- Matthew Martins
- Nqobile Ntuli
- Luke Schooling
- Garth Turner
- Cody van Wyk

Group Stage

Pos	Team	Pld	W	D	L	GF	GA	GD	Pts	Qualification
1	Spain	4	4	0	0	28	10	+18	12	Quarterfinals
2	Australia	4	2	0	2	21	17	+4	6	Quarterfinals
3	Canada	4	2	0	2	14	13	+1	6	Quarterfinals
4	South Africa	4	2	0	2	11	19	−8	6	Quarterfinals
5	Bangladesh	4	0	0	4	7	22	−15	0	

Source: FIH
Rules for classification: 1) points; 2) goal difference; 3) goals scored; 4) head-to-head result.

17 August 2014
19:00

South Africa	1 – 5	Canada
Ntuli 3'	Report	Panesar 7', 10'; Pereira 29'; Sidhu 31'; Sandhu 36'

Umpires:
Paul Walker (GBR)
Scott Embry (AUS)

19 August 2014
16:00

South Africa	6 – 5	Australia
Schooling 24', 34'; Kok 27', 30'; Crowe 27', 29'	Report	Weyer 2', 17'; Rasmussen 4'; Warne 7', 9'

Umpires:
Donovan Simmons (BER)
Epeli Tukuca (FIJ)

20 August 2014
19:30

Bangladesh	3 – 4	South Africa
Uddin 14'; Rabby 18'; Emon 28'	Report	Dlungwana 7'; Ntuli 18', 22', 31'

Umpires:
Sompop Boonsong (THA)
Donovan Simmons (BER)

21 August 2014
19:30

South Africa	0 – 6	Spain
	Report	Gonzalez 3', 30'; Lara 7', 18'; Tarres 17', 24'

Quarterfinal

23 August 2014
21:00

New Zealand	0 – 3	South Africa
	Report	Ntuli 4', 18', 26'

Umpires:
Aziz Adimah (GHA)
Duvaughn Henlon (JAM)

Semifinal

25 August 2014
19:30

South Africa	3 – 4	Australia
Crowe 12'; Turner 28'; Schooling 36'	Report	Stewart 18'; Howard 21', 34'; Corey Weyer 31'

Umpires:
Rawi Anbananthan (MAS)
Duvaughn Henlon (JAM)

Bronze Medal Match

27 August 2014
19:00

Spain	7 – 4	South Africa 4th
Farres 7', 15'; Parrilla 9'; Garcia 19'; Lara 20'; Bordas 34'; Tarres 36'	Report	Kok 18', 23'; Ntuli 24'; Bleeker 34'

Umpires:
Rawi Anbananthan (MAS)
Donovan Simmons (BER)

=== Girls' tournament ===
Roster

- Natalie Esteves
- Demi Harmse
- Chrissie Haupt
- Marizen Marais
- Kaydee Miller
- Kristen Paton
- Cheneal Raubenheimer
- Simone Strydom
- Buhle Zondi

Group Stage

Pos	Team	Pld	W	D	L	GF	GA	GD	Pts	Qualification
1	Netherlands	4	4	0	0	46	1	+45	12	Quarterfinals
2	Japan	4	2	1	1	42	16	+26	7	Quarterfinals
3	Argentina	4	2	1	1	34	9	+25	7	Quarterfinals
4	South Africa	4	1	0	3	8	34	−26	3	Quarterfinals
5	Fiji	4	0	0	4	3	73	−70	0	

Source: FIH
Rules for classification: 1) points; 2) goal difference; 3) goals scored; 4) head-to-head result.

17 August 2014
20:30

Japan	12 – 0	South Africa
Kawamura 2', 9', 9'; Mori 7', 17'; Kozuka 11', 12', 24'; Asai 24', 36'; Karino 28'; Hoshi 31'	Report

Umpires:
Liu Lijie (CHN)
Ana Escalante (MEX)

18 August 2014
19:00

Argentina	9 – 0	South Africa
Jankunas 3', 22'; Toccalino 4', 27'; Thome 8', 15'; Trinchinetti 20'; Retegui 24', 26'	Report

Umpires:
Ana Faias (POR)
Lucy Townend (NZL)

19 August 2014
19:30

South Africa	8 – 2	Fiji
Harmse 1', 13'; Marais 2', 18'; Paton 11', 22'; Raubenheimer 19'; Haupt 33'	Report	Bennion 20'; Ravatu 29'

Umpires:
Lucy Townend (NZL)
Ana Faias (POR)

21 August 2014
18:00

Netherlands	11 – 0	South Africa
Veen 8', 35'; Zerbo 9', 11'; Kerstholt 12', 26', 28', 35' van Erk 18'; Fortuin 22'; Wijsman 25'	Report

Umpires:
Emily Carroll (AUS)
Ana Escalante (MEX)

Quarterfinal

23 August 2014
17:30

China	7 – 1	South Africa
Zhang L. 1', 3'; Zhang X. 2', 13', 24'; Li 18'; Chen 20'	Report	Esteves 6'

Umpires:
Denise Pelletier (CAN)
Toh Li Min (SIN)

Classification Match 5th-8th Place

24 August 2014
17:30

South Africa	3 – 4	New Zealand
Esteves 26', 36'; Haupt 27'	Report	Hyatt Brown 4'; Robinson 6'; Waddell 18'; Davies 25'

Umpires:
Liu Lijie (CHN)
Ana Escalante (MEX)

7th Place Match

26 August 2014
16:00

Germany	6 – 1	South Africa
Scheidl 5'; Angerer 12', 14'; Jeltsch 18', 30'; Hohenhövel 24'	Report	Marais 9'

Umpires:
Lucy Townenda (NZL)
Ana Escalante (MEX)

== Golf ==
South Africa qualified one team of two athletes based on the 8 June 2014 IGF Combined World Amateur Golf Rankings.

Individual

Athlete	Event	Round 1		Round 2			Round 3			Total	
Athlete	Event	Score	Rank	Score	Total	Rank	Score	Total	Rank	Score	Rank
Kyle McClatchie	Boys	81	29	73	154	12	72	226	12	226	25
Kaleigh Telfer	Girls	82	29	Disqualified							

Team

Athletes	Event	Round 1 (Foursome)		Round 2 (Fourball)			Round 3 (Individual Stroke)				Total	
Athletes	Event	Score	Rank	Score	Total	Rank	Boy	Girl	Total	Rank	Score	Rank
Kyle McClatchie; Kaleigh Telfer	Mixed	65	6	78	143	28	74	73	147	17	290	17

== Gymnastics ==
=== Artistic Gymnastics ===
South Africa qualified two athletes based on its performance at the 2014 African Artistic Gymnastics Championships.

Boys

Athlete	Event	Apparatus						Total	Rank
Athlete	Event	F	PH	R	V	PB	HB	Total	Rank
Muhammad Mia	Qualification	12.150	12.150	10.800	12.150	9.750	11.300	68.300	36

Girls

Athlete	Event	Apparatus				Total	Rank
Athlete	Event	F	V	UB	BB	Total	Rank
Mammule Rankoe	Qualification	10.400	12.350	11.250	10.600	44.600	33

=== Rhythmic Gymnastics ===
South Africa qualified one athlete based on its performance at the 2014 African Rhythmic Championships.

Individual

Athlete	Event	Qualification						Final					
Athlete	Event	Hoop	Ball	Clubs	Ribbon	Total	Rank	Hoop	Ball	Clubs	Ribbon	Total	Rank
Shannon Gardiner	Individual	11.350	11.400	11.750	11.150	45.650	15	Did not advance					

== Judo ==
South Africa qualified one athlete based on its performance at the 2013 Cadet World Judo Championships.

Individual

Athlete	Event	Round of 16	Quarterfinals	Semifinals	Rep 1	Rep 2	Final / BM	Rank
Athlete	Event	Opposition Result	Opposition Result	Opposition Result	Opposition Result	Opposition Result	Opposition Result	Rank
Unelle Snyman	Girls' -78 kg	—N/a	Berger (BEL); W 010-0001	Matic (CRO); L 000-100	—N/a		Rodriguez (ESP); L 0002-0001	5

Team

Athletes	Event	Round of 16	Quarterfinals	Semifinals	Final	Rank
Athletes	Event	Opposition Result	Opposition Result	Opposition Result	Opposition Result	Rank
Team Van De Walle; Paola Acevedo (PUR); Leyla Aliyeva (AZE); Nokutula Banda (ZAM); Marco Montoya (COL); Ivan Silva Morales (CUB); Unelle Snyman (RSA); Peta Zadro (BIH)	Mixed Team	Bye	Team Geesink; L 3–4	Did not advance		5

== Sailing ==
South Africa qualified two boats based on its performance at the Byte CII African Continental Qualifiers.

Athlete	Event	Race											Net Points	Final Rank
Athlete	Event	1	2	3	4	5	6	7	8	9	10	M*	Net Points	Final Rank
Calvin Gibbs	Boys' Byte CII	15	20	15	23	16	~~25~~	22	CAN	CAN	CAN	26	137	25
Megan Robertson	Girls' Byte CII	25	20	~~30~~	30	28	28	25	CAN	CAN	CAN	22	178	30

== Shooting ==
South Africa qualified one shooter based on its performance at the 2014 African Shooting Championships.

Individual

Athlete	Event	Qualification		Final	
Athlete	Event	Points	Rank	Points	Rank
Sybrand Laurens	Boys' 10m Air Rifle	602.6	16	Did not advance	

Team

Athletes	Event	Qualification		Round of 16	Quarterfinals	Semifinals	Final / BM	Rank
Athletes	Event	Points	Rank	Opposition Result	Opposition Result	Opposition Result	Opposition Result	Rank
Ivana Babic (CRO); Sybrand Laurens (RSA)	Mixed Team 10m Air Rifle	811.9	14 Q	Borgo (MEX); Alvian (INA); W 10–6	Riccardi (SMR); Milovanovic (SRB); L 6–10	Did not advance		5

== Swimming ==
South Africa qualified eight swimmers.

Boys

Athlete	Event	Heat		Semifinal		Final	
Athlete	Event	Time	Rank	Time	Rank	Time	Rank
Joshua Steyn	100 m freestyle	52.19	27	Did not advance			
Joshua Steyn	200 m freestyle	1:50.79	5 Q	—N/a		1:50.06	5
Joshua Steyn	50 m butterfly	24.87	10 Q	24.74	11	Did not advance	
Joshua Steyn	100 m butterfly	53.74	3 Q	54.25	8 Q	53.63	4
Brent Szurdoki	200 m freestyle	1:52.59	18	—N/a		Did not advance	
Brent Szurdoki	400 m freestyle	3:56.84	14	—N/a		Did not advance	
Brent Szurdoki	800 m freestyle	—N/a				8:15.51	14
Christopher Reid	50 m backstroke	26.71	14 Q	26.75	16	Did not advance	
Christopher Reid	100 m backstroke	56.25	7 Q	55.55	9	Did not advance	
Christopher Reid	200 m backstroke	2:00.93	3 Q	—N/a		1:59.77	5
Christopher Reid	200 m individual medley	2:04.19	6 Q	—N/a		2:04.43	7
Jarred Crous	50 m breaststroke	28.66	4 Q	28.79	7 Q	28.46	4
Jarred Crous	100 m breaststroke	1:02.53	5 Q	1:02.30	4 Q	1:02.17	6
Jarred Crous	200 m breaststroke	2:16.65	8 Q	—N/a		2:15.52	6
Jarred Crous; Christopher Reid; Joshua Steyn; Brent Szurdoki	4 × 100 m freestyle relay	3:29.24	7 Q	—N/a		3:28.86	8
Jarred Crous; Christopher Reid; Joshua Steyn; Brent Szurdoki	4 × 100 m medley relay	3:45.97	3 Q	—N/a		3:42.39	4

Girls

Athlete	Event	Heat		Semifinal		Final	
Athlete	Event	Time	Rank	Time	Rank	Time	Rank
Marlies Ross	100 m freestyle	57.30	17	Did not advance			
Marlies Ross	200 m freestyle	2:03.73	19	—N/a		Did not advance	
Marlies Ross	200 m individual medley	2:15.45	2 Q	—N/a		2:15.25	7
Michelle Weber	400 m freestyle	4:26.87	23	—N/a		Did not advance	
Michelle Weber	800 m freestyle	—N/a				9:00.16	16
Nathania van Niekerk	100 m backstroke	1:03.94	18	Did not advance			
Nathania van Niekerk	200 m backstroke	2:17.02	11	—N/a		Did not advance	
Justine MacFarlane	50 m breaststroke	32.85	18	Did not advance			
Justine MacFarlane	100 m breaststroke	1:11.37	14 Q	1:10.55	12	Did not advance	
Justine MacFarlane	200 m breaststroke	2:33.14	8 Q	—N/a		2:32.57	7
Justine MacFarlane; Marlies Ross; Nathania van Niekerk; Michelle Weber	4 × 100 m freestyle relay	3:59.05	10	—N/a		Did not advance	
Justine MacFarlane; Marlies Ross; Nathania van Niekerk; Michelle Weber	4 × 100 m medley relay	4:15.13	6 Q	—N/a		4:15.44	7

Mixed

Athlete	Event	Heat		Final	
Athlete	Event	Time	Rank	Time	Rank
Christopher Reid; Marlies Ross; Joshua Steyn; Nathania van Niekerk	4 × 100 m freestyle relay	3:40.81	12	Did not advance	
Jarred Crous; Marlies Ross; Joshua Steyn; Nathania van Niekerk	4 × 100 m medley relay	3:57.44	4 Q	3:54.86	5

== Tennis ==
South Africa qualified one athlete based on the 9 June 2014 ITF World Junior Rankings.

Singles

Athlete	Event	Round of 32	Round of 16	Quarterfinals	Semifinals	Final / BM	Rank
Athlete	Event	Opposition Score	Opposition Score	Opposition Score	Opposition Score	Opposition Score	Rank
Lloyd Harris	Boys' Singles	Rybakov (USA); W 7–6, 6–4	Majchrzak (POL); L 2–6, 0–6	Did not advance			9

Doubles

Athletes	Event	Round of 32	Round of 16	Quarterfinals	Semifinals	Final / BM	Rank
Athletes	Event	Opposition Score	Opposition Score	Opposition Score	Opposition Score	Opposition Score	Rank
Lloyd Harris (RSA); Guy Orly Iradukunda (BDI)	Boys' Doubles	—N/a	Majchrzak (POL); Zielinski (POL); L 1–6, 4–6	Did not advance			9
Sandra Samir (EGY); Lloyd Harris (RSA)	Mixed Doubles	Kalinina (UKR); Rogan (MNE); W 6–2, 6–4	Giangreco (PAR); Zormann (BRA); L 7–5, 3–6, [5–10]	Did not advance			9

== Triathlon ==
South Africa qualified two athletes based on its performance at the 2014 African Youth Olympic Games Qualifier.

Individual

Athlete	Event	Swim (750m)	Trans 1	Bike (20 km)	Trans 2	Run (5 km)	Total Time	Rank
Nathan le Roux	Boys	10:32	0:44	31:00	0:25	18:50	1:01:31	27
Jayme-Sue Vermaas	Girls	10:31	0:45	33:24	0:25	19:34	1:04:39	18

Relay

Athlete	Event	Total Times per Athlete (Swim 250m, Bike 6.6 km, Run 1.8 km)	Total Group Time	Rank
Africa 1 Rehab Hamdy (EGY); Khaled Essam (EGY); Jayme-Sue Vermaas (RSA); Nathan Le Roux (RSA)	Mixed Relay	25:13; 22:25; 23:47; 21:05	1:32:30	14

== Wrestling ==
South Africa qualified three athletes based on its performance at the 2014 African Cadet Championships.

Key:
- VT - Victory by Fall.
- PP - Decision by Points - the loser with technical points.
- PO - Decision by Points - the loser without technical points.

Boys

Athlete	Event	Group stage				Final / RM	Rank
Athlete	Event	Opposition Score	Opposition Score	Opposition Score	Rank	Opposition Score	Rank
Reynardt Louw	Freestyle -54kg	Al-Shebami (YEM); L 1–3 ^{PP}	Fix (USA); L 0–4 ^{VT}	Sejfulau (MKD); W 4–0 ^{VT}	3	5th Place Match; Guvazhokov (RUS); L 1–4 ^{ST}	6
Elbert Steyn	Freestyle -63kg	Dydasco (PLW); W 4–0 ^{VT}	Mammadov (AZE); L 0–4 ^{ST}	Julakidze (GEO); L 0–3 ^{PO}	3	5th Place Match; Moore (CAN); W 4–0 ^{VT}	5

Girls

Athlete	Event	Group stage				Final / RM	Rank
Athlete	Event	Opposition Score	Opposition Score	Opposition Score	Rank	Opposition Score	Rank
Leanco Stans	Freestyle -60kg	Parra (COL); L 0–3	Aquino (GUM); W 4–1	Pei (CHN); L 0–4	3	5th Place Match; Mane (IND); L 0–3 ^{PO}	6
