= Swimming at the 2014 Summer Youth Olympics – Boys' 100 metre breaststroke =

Boys' 100 metre breaststroke at the 2014 Summer Youth Olympics
- Venue: Nanjing Olympic Sports Centre
- Dates: 17 August (heats, semifinals); 18 August (final)
- Competitors: 37 from 35 nations
- Winning time: 1:01.29

Medalists
gold medal	Anton Chupkov	Russia
silver medal	Maximilian Pilger	Germany
bronze medal	Carlos Claverie	Venezuela

The boys' 100 metre breaststroke event in swimming at the 2014 Summer Youth Olympics took place on 17 and 18 August at the Nanjing Olympic Sports Centre in Nanjing, China.

== Results ==
=== Heats ===
The heats were held at 10:54.

Rank	Heat	Lane	Name	Nationality	Time	Notes
1	3	4	Carlos Claverie	Venezuela	1:01.62	Q
2	3	5	Anton Chupkov	Russia	1:02.07	Q
3	5	5	Ippei Watanabe	Japan	1:02.26	Q
4	3	8	Nikola Obrovac	Croatia	1:02.49	Q
5	5	3	Jarred Crous	South Africa	1:02.53	Q
6	3	3	Andreas Mickosz	Brazil	1:02.74	Q
7	2	8	Dustin Tynes	Bahamas	1:02.97	Q
8	4	7	Stanislau Pazdzeyeu	Belarus	1:02.99	Q
9	5	6	Dávid Horváth	Hungary	1:03.27	Q
10	3	6	Grayson Bell	Australia	1:03.32	Q
11	5	7	Yauhen Kavaliou	Belarus	1:03.42	Q
12	5	1	Paulius Grigaliūnas	Lithuania	1:03.50	Q
13	4	5	Jean Dencausse	France	1:03.57	Q
14	2	2	Andrei Roman	Romania	1:03.61	Q
15	5	2	Kim Jae-youn	South Korea	1:03.62	Q
16	4	3	Maximilian Pilger	Germany	1:03.70	Q
17	4	2	Luca Pfyffer	Switzerland	1:03.73	
18	4	6	Basten Caerts	Belgium	1:03.82	
19	5	8	Gonzalo Carazo	Spain	1:03.84	
20	4	8	Jordy Groters	Aruba	1:03.96	
21	1	4	Andrey Pravdivtsev	Uzbekistan	1:03.99	
22	3	2	Cai Bing-rong	Chinese Taipei	1:04.23	
23	2	1	Luis Jasso	Mexico	1:04.48	
24	2	5	Yuta Sato	Japan	1:04.54	
25	2	6	Josué Domínguez	Dominican Republic	1:04.58	
26	4	1	Zhang Zhihao	China	1:04.62	
27	1	6	Jakob Nordman	Finland	1:04.86	
28	2	7	Jesús Flores	Honduras	1:04.96	
29	3	1	Dmitriy Goverdovskiy	Kazakhstan	1:05.02	
30	2	4	Jacob Garrod	New Zealand	1:05.30	
31	3	7	Vojtěch Simbartl	Czech Republic	1:05.38	
32	1	3	Julian Harding	Malta	1:06.38	
33	2	3	Mohamed Fekiri	Tunisia	1:06.96	
34	4	4	Walid Daloul	Qatar	1:07.42	
35	1	5	Sutton Choi	Hong Kong	1:07.56	
36	5	4	Troy Kojenlang	Marshall Islands	1:10.80	
37	1	2	Sopha Cheng	Cambodia	1:17.64	

=== Semifinals ===
The semifinals were held at 18:38.

Rank	Heat	Lane	Name	Nationality	Time	Notes
1	1	4	Anton Chupkov	Russia	1:00.84	Q, WJR
2	2	4	Carlos Claverie	Venezuela	1:01.71	Q
3	2	5	Ippei Watanabe	Japan	1:02.00	Q
4	2	3	Jarred Crous	South Africa	1:02.30	Q
5	1	8	Maximilian Pilger	Germany	1:02.58	Q
6	2	2	Dávid Horváth	Hungary	1:02.63	Q
7	1	5	Nikola Obrovac	Croatia	1:02.79	Q
8	1	3	Andreas Mickosz	Brazil	1:02.89	Q
9	1	6	Stanislau Pazdzeyeu	Belarus	1:02.95	
10	2	8	Kim Jae-youn	South Korea	1:03.01	
11	1	2	Grayson Bell	Australia	1:03.13	
12	2	7	Yauhen Kavaliou	Belarus	1:03.24	
13	1	7	Paulius Grigaliūnas	Lithuania	1:03.39	
14	2	6	Dustin Tynes	Bahamas	1:03.46	
15	1	1	Andrei Roman	Romania	1:03.63	
16	2	1	Jean Dencausse	France	1:03.94	

=== Final ===
The final was held at 19:02.

Rank	Lane	Name	Nationality	Time	Notes
1st place, gold medalist(s)	4	Anton Chupkov	Russia	1:01.29	
2nd place, silver medalist(s)	2	Maximilian Pilger	Germany	1:01.51	
3rd place, bronze medalist(s)	5	Carlos Claverie	Venezuela	1:01.56	
4	3	Ippei Watanabe	Japan	1:01.66	
5	1	Nikola Obrovac	Croatia	1:01.94	
6	6	Jarred Crous	South Africa	1:02.17	
7	7	Dávid Horváth	Hungary	1:02.38	
8	8	Andreas Mickosz	Brazil	1:02.82	
