= Germany at the 2014 Summer Youth Olympics =

- IOC code: GER
- NOC: German Olympic Sports Confederation
- Website: www.dosb.de

in Nanjing
- Competitors: 85 in 21 sports
- Medals Ranked 25th: Gold 2 Silver 8 Bronze 15 Total 25

Summer Youth Olympics appearances
- 2010; 2014; 2018

Germany competed at the 2014 Summer Youth Olympics, in Nanjing, China from 16 August to 28 August 2014.

== Medalists ==
Medals awarded to participants of mixed-NOC (Combined) teams are represented in italics. These medals are not counted towards the individual NOC medal tally.

Medal	Name	Sport	Event	Date
Gold	Tim Naske	Rowing	Boys' Single Sculls	20 August
Gold	Kristin Ranwig	Triathlon	Mixed Relay	21 August
Gold	Merten Howe	Athletics	Mixed 8x100m Relay	26 August
Gold	Peter Kadiru	Boxing	Boys' +91 kg	27 August
Silver	Maximilian Pilger	Swimming	Boys' 100 m breaststroke	18 August
Silver	Julia Willers	Swimming	Girls' 50 m breaststroke	18 August
Silver	Alexander Kunert; Maximilian Pilger; Merek Ulrich; Damian Wierling	Swimming	Boys' 4×100 m medley relay	20 August
Silver	Hamza Adnan Karim	Taekwondo	Boys' −73 kg	20 August
Silver	Henrik Hannemann	Athletics	Boys' 110 m Hurdles	23 August
Silver	Clemens Prüfer	Athletics	Boys' Discus Throw	23 August
Silver	Alina Reh	Athletics	Girls' 3000 m	24 August
Silver	Cynthia Freywald	Archery	Mixed Team	24 August
Silver	Fabienne Schönig	Athletics	Girls' Javelin Throw	25 August
Bronze	Daniel Chiovetta	Taekwondo	Boys' −48 kg	17 August
Bronze	Jennifer Schwille	Judo	Girls' -63 kg	18 August
Bronze	Damian Wierling	Swimming	Boys' 200 m freestyle	18 August
Bronze	Domenik Schoenefeldt	Judo	Boys' -100 kg	19 August
Bronze	Julia Budde	Shooting	Girls' 10m Air Rifle	19 August
Bronze	Alexander Kunert; Maximilian Pilger; Merek Ulrich; Damian Wierling	Swimming	Boys' 4×100 m freestyle relay	19 August
Bronze	Damian Wierling	Swimming	Boys' 100 m freestyle	22 August
Bronze	Kathrin Demler	Swimming	Girls' 400 m freestyle	22 August
Bronze	Mareen Kalis	Athletics	Girls' 800 m	23 August
Bronze	Anika Nehls	Athletics	Girls' Shot Put	23 August
Bronze	Anna Matthes	Modern Pentathlon	Girls' Individual	23 August
Bronze	Merten Howe	Athletics	Boys' Shot Put	24 August
Bronze	Lara Kempka	Athletics	Girls' Discus Throw	24 August
Bronze	Lisa Arnholdt; Sarah Schneider	Beach Volleyball	Girls' Tournament	26 August
Bronze	Birgit Ohmayer	Canoeing	Girls' C1 Slalom	27 August

== Archery ==
Germany qualified a male archer from its performance at the 2013 World Archery Youth Championships. Germany later qualified a female archer from its performance at the 2014 European Archery Youth Championships.

Individual

Athlete	Event	Ranking round		Round of 32	Round of 16	Quarterfinals	Semifinals	Final / BM	Rank
Athlete	Event	Score	Seed	Opposition Score	Opposition Score	Opposition Score	Opposition Score	Opposition Score	Rank
Andreas Mayr	Boys' Individual	678	7	Turner (AUS); W 7–1	Muto (JPN); L 1–7	did not advance			9
Cynthia Freywald	Girls' Individual	630	16	Villegas (VEN); L 2–6	did not advance				17

Team

Athletes	Event	Ranking round		Round of 32	Round of 16	Quarterfinals	Semifinals	Final / BM	Rank
Athletes	Event	Score	Seed	Opposition Score	Opposition Score	Opposition Score	Opposition Score	Opposition Score	Rank
Cynthia Freywald (GER); Muhamad Zarif Syahiir Zolkepeli (MAS)	Mixed Team	1284	15	Sainz (CUB); Tapia (MEX); W 5–3	Tatafu (TGA); Mayr (GER); W 5-4	Koike (JPN); Denny (GBR); W 5-4	Romero (GUA); Martens (BEL); W 6-2	Li (CHN); Moreno (PHI); L 0–6	2nd place, silver medalist(s)
Lucy Tatafu (TGA); Andreas Mayr (GER)	Mixed Team	1291	2	Elshimy (EGY); Verma (IND); W 6–0	Freywald (GER); Zolkepeli (MAS); L 4-5	did not advance			9

== Athletics ==
Germany qualified 13 athletes.

Qualification Legend: Q=Final A (medal); qB=Final B (non-medal); qC=Final C (non-medal); qD=Final D (non-medal); qE=Final E (non-medal)

Boys
Track & road events

Athlete	Event	Heats		Final	
Athlete	Event	Result	Rank	Result	Rank
Henrik Hannemann	110 m hurdles	13.55 PB	1 Q	13.40 PB	2nd place, silver medalist(s)

Field Events

Athlete	Event	Qualification		Final	
Athlete	Event	Distance	Rank	Distance	Rank
Merten Howe	Shot put	19.89	3 Q	20.13	3rd place, bronze medalist(s)
Clemens Prüfer	Discus throw	59.88	2 Q	63.52	2nd place, silver medalist(s)

Girls
Track & road events

Athlete	Event	Heats		Final	
Athlete	Event	Result	Rank	Result	Rank
Mareen Kalis	800 m	2:05.67 PB	1 Q	2:06.03	3rd place, bronze medalist(s)
Konstanze Klosterhalfen	1500 m	4:22.00	1 Q	4:21.02	4
Alina Reh	3000 m	9:08.70	6 Q	9:05.07	2nd place, silver medalist(s)
Eileen Demes	400 m hurdles	58.68 PB	2 Q	1:10.21	8

Field events

Athlete	Event	Qualification		Final	
Athlete	Event	Distance	Rank	Distance	Rank
Sharin Oziegbe	Long jump	5.75	9 qB	5.40	13
Selina Schulenburg	High jump	1.78	6 Q	1.78	6
Juliane Schulze	Pole vault	3.70	7 Q	3.70	6
Anika Nehls	Shot put	17.22	2 Q	17.31	3rd place, bronze medalist(s)
Lara Kempka	Discus throw	47.00	5 Q	50.70	3rd place, bronze medalist(s)
Fabienne Schönig	Javelin throw	52.83	2 Q	53.68	2nd place, silver medalist(s)

Mixed events

Athletes	Event	Heats		Final	
Athletes	Event	Result	Rank	Result	Rank
Team 034; Merten Howe; Germany; Daou Bacar Aboubacar; Comoros; Trae Williams; Australia; Witthawat Thumvha; Thailand; Maria Simancas; Venezuela; Tatiana Blagoveshchenskaia; Russia; Lakeisha Ashley Warner; British Virgin Islands; Ioana Teodora Gheorghe; Romania	8×100 m relay mixed teams	1:41.79	2 Q	1:40.20	1st place, gold medalist(s)

== Badminton ==
Germany qualified two athletes based on the 2 May 2014 BWF Junior World Rankings.

Singles

Athlete	Event	Group stage				Quarterfinal	Semifinal	Final / BM	Rank
Athlete	Event	Opposition Score	Opposition Score	Opposition Score	Rank	Opposition Score	Opposition Score	Opposition Score	Rank
Max Weisskirchen	Boys' Singles	Krapez (SLO); W 21–12, 21–13	Citron (FRA); W 12–21, 21–16, 21–19	Vlaar (NED); W 21–17, 21–12	1	Shi (CHN); L 8–21, 15–21	did not advance		5
Luise Heim	Girls' Singles	Ng (HKG); L 18–21, 13–21	Kuuba (EST); W 21–11, 21–12	Mitsova (BUL); W 21–17, 21–13	2	did not advance			9

Doubles

Athlete	Event	Group stage				Quarterfinal	Semifinal	Final / BM	Rank
Athlete	Event	Opposition Score	Opposition Score	Opposition Score	Rank	Opposition Score	Opposition Score	Opposition Score	Rank
Rugshaar Ishaak (SUR); Max Weisskirchen (GER)	Mixed Doubles	Ginting (INA); Beton (SLO); L 16–21, 8–21	Shishkov (BUL); Heim (GER); W 21–18, 21–18	Kurt (TUR); Pavlinic (CRO); L 15–21, 20–22	3	did not advance			17
Luise Heim (GER); Vladimir Shishkov (BUL)	Mixed Doubles	Kurt (TUR); Pavlinic (CRO); L 18–21, 7–21	Weisskirchen (GER); Ishaak (SUR); L 18–21, 18–21	Ginting (INA); Beton (SLO); L 19–21, 9–21	4	did not advance			25

== Basketball ==
Germany qualified a boys' and girls' team based on the 1 June 2014 FIBA 3x3 National Federation Rankings.

Skills Competition

Athlete	Event	Qualification				Final			
Athlete	Event	Round 1	Round 2	Total	Rank	Round 1	Round 2	Total	Rank
Anton Zraychenko	Boys' Dunk Contest	0	28	28	12	did not advance			

Athlete	Event	Qualification			Final		
Athlete	Event	Points	Time	Rank	Points	Time	Rank
Patricia Brossmann	Girls' Shoot-out Contest	5	20.7	8	did not advance		
Annika Kuper	Girls' Shoot-out Contest	3	27.7	43	did not advance		
Luana Rodefeld	Girls' Shoot-out Contest	5	26.2	12	did not advance		

=== Boys' tournament ===
Roster

- Alexander Herrmann
- Jannes Hundt
- Jonas Niedermanner
- Anton Zraychenko

Group Stage

Pos	Team	Pld	W	L	PF	PA	PD	Pts	Qualification
1	Lithuania	9	9	0	165	129	+36	18	Round of 16
2	Slovenia	9	7	2	152	120	+32	16	Round of 16
3	China	9	6	3	164	143	+21	15 (Note: CHN +1, PUR −1)	Round of 16
4	Puerto Rico	9	6	3	152	136	+16	15	Round of 16
5	Poland	9	5	4	153	127	+26	14	Round of 16
6	France	9	4	5	151	127	+24	13	Round of 16
7	Hungary	9	3	6	158	165	−7	12	Round of 16
8	Uruguay	9	2	7	103	154	−51	11 (Note: URU +1, GER −1)	Round of 16
9	Germany	9	2	7	118	149	−31	11	Eliminated
10	Indonesia	9	1	8	86	152	−66	10	Eliminated

Notes:

18 August 2014
17:20

Germany	18–15	China
Pts: Hundt 7		Pts: Fu 6

Wutaishan Sports Center, Nanjing

18 August 2014
21:40

Hungary	13–18	Germany
Pts: Kis 5		Pts: Zraychenko 6

Wutaishan Sports Center, Nanjing

19 August 2014
19:40

Germany	9–21	Slovenia
Pts: Zraychenko 5		Pts: 3 players 6

Wutaishan Sports Center, Nanjing

20 August 2014
18:20

Germany	14–15	Uruguay
Pts: Hundt 9		Pts: Jones 12

Wutaishan Sports Center, Nanjing

20 August 2014
21:20

Lithuania	21–15	Germany
Pts: Zemaitis 11		Pts: Herrmann 7

Wutaishan Sports Center, Nanjing

22 August 2014
19:40

Germany	12–15	Poland
Pts: Hundt, Zraychenko 5		Pts: Wadowski, Fatz 6

Wutaishan Sports Center, Nanjing

23 August 2014
17:40

France	20–11	Germany
Pts: Cheremond 9		Pts: Hundt 6

Wutaishan Sports Center, Nanjing

23 August 2014
21:00

Germany	12–19	Puerto Rico
Pts: Herrmann 6		Pts: Ralat 15

Wutaishan Sports Center, Nanjing

24 August 2014
19:40

Indonesia	10–9	Germany
Pts: Teja, Pangesthio 4		Pts: Zraychenko 4

Wutaishan Sports Center, Nanjing

=== Girls' tournament ===
Roster

- Patricia Broßmann
- Aliyah Konate
- Annika Küper
- Luana Rodefeld

Group Stage

Pos	Team	Pld	W	D	L	PF	PA	PD	Pts	Qualification
1	Netherlands	9	8	0	1	164	87	+77	24	Round of 16
2	Hungary	9	8	0	1	146	91	+55	24	Round of 16
3	Spain	9	7	0	2	151	95	+56	21	Round of 16
4	Estonia	9	5	0	4	130	109	+21	15	Round of 16
5	China	9	5	0	4	128	103	+25	15	Round of 16
6	Germany	9	4	0	5	111	133	−22	12	Round of 16
7	Brazil	9	3	0	6	101	123	−22	9	Round of 16
8	Venezuela	9	2	0	7	101	153	−52	6	Round of 16
9	Slovenia	9	2	0	7	120	156	−36	6	Eliminated
10	Syria	9	1	0	8	68	170	−102	3	Eliminated

18 August 2014
19:20

Germany	12–10	Venezuela
Pts: Kuper 5		Pts: Padilla, Garcia 4

Wutaishan Sports Center, Nanjing

19 August 2014
17:00

Syria	9–17	Germany
Pts: Assad 5		Pts: Rodefeld 8

Wutaishan Sports Center, Nanjing

19 August 2014
20:40

Germany	7–15	Hungary
Pts: Rodefeld 3		Pts: Aho, Nagy 6

Wutaishan Sports Center, Nanjing

20 August 2014
20:00

Spain	16–13	Germany
Pts: Orts i Martinez 7		Pts: Brossmann 6

Wutaishan Sports Center, Nanjing

22 August 2014
17:20

Germany	13–18	Slovenia
Pts: Brossmann 7		Pts: Micunovic 13

Wutaishan Sports Center, Nanjing

22 August 2014
21:40

Germany	16–11	Brazil
Pts: Rodefeld 7		Pts: Moura Quieroz Dias 7

Wutaishan Sports Center, Nanjing

23 August 2014
19:00

Netherlands	20–10	Germany
Pts: Fokke 7		Pts: Rodefeld 6

Wutaishan Sports Center, Nanjing

24 August 2014
17:00

Germany	6–18	China
Pts: Brossmann 4		Pts: Wang 9

Wutaishan Sports Center, Nanjing

24 August 2014
20:20

Estonia	14–17	Germany
Pts: Lass 11		Pts: Rodefeld 8

Wutaishan Sports Center, Nanjing

Last 16

25 August 2014
17:00

Germany	9–5	Thailand
Pts: Rodefeld 4		Pts: Thuamon 2

Wutaishan Sports Center, Nanjing

Quarterfinal

25 August 2014
20:00

Germany	13–20	Hungary
Pts: Brossmann 8		Pts: Nagy 7

Wutaishan Sports Center, Nanjing

Knockout Stage

Round of 16	Quarterfinals	Semifinals	Final	Rank
Opposition Score	Opposition Score	Opposition Score	Opposition Score	Rank
Thailand; W 9-5	Hungary; L 13–20	did not advance		

== Beach Volleyball ==
Germany qualified a boys' and girls' team from their performance at the 2014 CEV Youth Continental Cup Final.

Athletes	Event	Preliminary round	Standing	Round of 24	Round of 16	Quarterfinals	Semifinals	Final / BM	Rank
Athletes	Event	Opposition Score	Standing	Opposition Score	Opposition Score	Opposition Score	Opposition Score	Opposition Score	Rank
Niklas Rudolf; Eric Stadie	Boys'	Navickas / Vaskelis (LTU); W 21–17, 21–18	1	Bye	Pristauz / Kratz (AUT); W 21–18, 21–15	Aveiro / Aulisi (ARG); L 22–20, 18–21, 17–19	did not advance		5
Niklas Rudolf; Eric Stadie	Boys'	George / Arthur (BRA); W 24–26, 22–20, 15–12	1	Bye	Pristauz / Kratz (AUT); W 21–18, 21–15	Aveiro / Aulisi (ARG); L 22–20, 18–21, 17–19	did not advance		5
Niklas Rudolf; Eric Stadie	Boys'	Hutchinson / Bryan (JAM); W 21–12, 21–15	1	Bye	Pristauz / Kratz (AUT); W 21–18, 21–15	Aveiro / Aulisi (ARG); L 22–20, 18–21, 17–19	did not advance		5
Niklas Rudolf; Eric Stadie	Boys'	Moussa / Veldich (CGO); W 21–9, 21–11	1	Bye	Pristauz / Kratz (AUT); W 21–18, 21–15	Aveiro / Aulisi (ARG); L 22–20, 18–21, 17–19	did not advance		5
Niklas Rudolf; Eric Stadie	Boys'	Moore / Robinson (NZL); W 21–13, 21–11	1	Bye	Pristauz / Kratz (AUT); W 21–18, 21–15	Aveiro / Aulisi (ARG); L 22–20, 18–21, 17–19	did not advance		5
Lisa Arnholdt; Sarah Schneider	Girls'	Ward / Davidson (TRI); W 21–15, 21–7	1	Bye	Gerson / Rohrer (SUI); W 20–22, 21–16, 15–12	Valkova / Adamcikova (CZE); W 19–21, 21–13, 15–9	McNamara / McNamara (CAN); L 18–21, 18–21	Bronze Medal Match; Makroguzova / Rudykh (RUS); W 21–14, 27–25	3rd place, bronze medalist(s)
Lisa Arnholdt; Sarah Schneider	Girls'	Maida / Vargas (BOL); W 21–8, 21–10	1	Bye	Gerson / Rohrer (SUI); W 20–22, 21–16, 15–12	Valkova / Adamcikova (CZE); W 19–21, 21–13, 15–9	McNamara / McNamara (CAN); L 18–21, 18–21	Bronze Medal Match; Makroguzova / Rudykh (RUS); W 21–14, 27–25	3rd place, bronze medalist(s)
Lisa Arnholdt; Sarah Schneider	Girls'	Nanda / Andriani (INA); W 21–17, 21–13	1	Bye	Gerson / Rohrer (SUI); W 20–22, 21–16, 15–12	Valkova / Adamcikova (CZE); W 19–21, 21–13, 15–9	McNamara / McNamara (CAN); L 18–21, 18–21	Bronze Medal Match; Makroguzova / Rudykh (RUS); W 21–14, 27–25	3rd place, bronze medalist(s)
Lisa Arnholdt; Sarah Schneider	Girls'	Petronie / Reine (CGO); W 21–11, 21–10	1	Bye	Gerson / Rohrer (SUI); W 20–22, 21–16, 15–12	Valkova / Adamcikova (CZE); W 19–21, 21–13, 15–9	McNamara / McNamara (CAN); L 18–21, 18–21	Bronze Medal Match; Makroguzova / Rudykh (RUS); W 21–14, 27–25	3rd place, bronze medalist(s)
Lisa Arnholdt; Sarah Schneider	Girls'	Wang / Yuan (CHN); W 21–12, 21–8	1	Bye	Gerson / Rohrer (SUI); W 20–22, 21–16, 15–12	Valkova / Adamcikova (CZE); W 19–21, 21–13, 15–9	McNamara / McNamara (CAN); L 18–21, 18–21	Bronze Medal Match; Makroguzova / Rudykh (RUS); W 21–14, 27–25	3rd place, bronze medalist(s)

== Boxing ==
Germany qualified one boxer based on its performance at the 2014 AIBA Youth World Championships

Boys

Athlete	Event	Preliminaries	Semifinals	Final / RM	Rank
Athlete	Event	Opposition Result	Opposition Result	Opposition Result	Rank
Peter Kadiru	+91 kg	Bye	Tahirov (AZE); W TKO	Rock (USA); W 3–0	1st place, gold medalist(s)

== Canoeing ==
Germany qualified three boats based on its performance at the 2013 World Junior Canoe Sprint and Slalom Championships.

Boys

Athlete	Event	Qualification		Repechage		Round of 16		Quarterfinals	Semifinals	Final / BM	Rank
Athlete	Event	Time	Rank	Time	Rank	Time	Rank	Opposition Result	Opposition Result	Opposition Result	Rank
Tim Weiß	K1 slalom	1:35.071	14 Q	—N/a		1:26.606	11	did not advance			11
Tim Weiß	K1 sprint	1:36.798	5 Q	Bye		1:37.152	6 Q	Mozgi (HUN); L 1:36.758	Did not advance		5

Girls

Athlete	Event	Qualification		Repechage		Round of 16		Quarterfinals	Semifinals	Final / BM	Rank
Athlete	Event	Time	Rank	Time	Rank	Time	Rank	Opposition Result	Opposition Result	Opposition Result	Rank
Birgit Ohmayer	C1 slalom	1:30.014	3 Q	—N/a				Lavoie-Parent (CAN); W 1:35.125	Weratschnig (AUT); L 1:35.471	Prioux (FRA); W 1:30.686	3rd place, bronze medalist(s)
Birgit Ohmayer	C1 sprint	4:07.384	11 R	3:31.792	7	—N/a		Did not advance			11
Selina Jones	K1 slalom	1:18.333	4 Q	—N/a		1:18.255	4 Q	Pellicer Chica (AND); W 1:22.062	Yan (CHN); L 1:23.701	Hilgertová (CZE); L 1:22.062	4
Selina Jones	K1 sprint	2:27.114	16 R	Did not finish		Did not advance					19

== Diving ==
Germany qualified three quotas based on its performance at the Nanjing 2014 Diving Qualifying Event.

Athlete	Event	Preliminary		Final	
Athlete	Event	Points	Rank	Points	Rank
Timo Barthel	Boys' 3 m springboard	527.15	3 Q	548.40	4
Timo Barthel	Boys' 10 m platform	451.20	7 Q	481.65	5
Josefin Schneider	Girls' 3 m springboard	404.40	4 Q	380.30	10
Timo Barthel (GER); Ingrid de Oliveira (BRA)	Mixed team	—N/a		280.40	10
Philippe Gagne (CAN); Josefin Schneider (GER)	Mixed team	—N/a		326.05	5

== Fencing ==
Germany qualified two athletes based on its performance at the 2014 FIE Cadet World Championships.

Boys

Athlete	Event	Pool Round	Seed	Round of 16	Quarterfinals	Semifinals	Final / BM	Rank
Athlete	Event	Opposition Score	Seed	Opposition Score	Opposition Score	Opposition Score	Opposition Score	Rank
Samuel Unterhauser	Épée	27–13	2	—N/a	Esztergalyos (HUN); L 10–15	did not advance		5
Fabian Braun	Foil		8	Files (CRO); L 10–15	did not advance			9

Mixed Team

Athletes	Event	Round of 16	Quarterfinals	Semifinals / PM	Final / PM	Rank
Athletes	Event	Opposition Score	Opposition Score	Opposition Score	Opposition Score	Rank
Team Europe 4 Claudia Borella (ITA); Inna Brovko (UKR); D. Tudor Cucu (ROU); Petar Files (CRO); Theodora Gkountoura (GRE); Samuel Unterhauser (GER)	Mixed Team	Bye	Team Asia-Oceania 1 L 22–30	Team Americas 1 W 30-27	Team Americas 2 L 28-30	6

== Field hockey ==
Germany qualified a boys' and girls' team based on its performance at the 2013 Youth European Championship.

=== Boys' tournament ===
Roster

- Jonas Grill
- Luca Großmann
- Anton Körber
- Lucas Lampe
- Jan Mertens
- Jannick Rowedder
- Felix Schneider
- Philip Strzys
- Simon Wenzel

Group Stage

Pos	Team	Pld	W	D	L	GF	GA	GD	Pts	Qualification
1	New Zealand	4	3	1	0	28	12	+16	10	Quarterfinals
2	Pakistan	4	3	1	0	27	12	+15	10	Quarterfinals
3	Mexico	4	1	0	3	11	20	−9	3	Quarterfinals
4	Zambia	4	1	0	3	14	24	−10	3	Quarterfinals
5	Germany	4	1	0	3	10	22	−12	3	

Source: FIH
Rules for classification: 1) points; 2) goal difference; 3) goals scored; 4) head-to-head result.

18 August 2014
17:30

Germany	1 – 8	Zambia
Grossmann 36'		Mpande 1', 5', 34', 36'; Tembo 18', 28'; Lowole 31', 32'

19 August 2014
18:00

Pakistan	6–2	Germany
Atiq 6'; Ali 8', 29'; Irshad; Mahmood 16'; Malik 18'	Report	Schneider 9'; Grossmann 21'

Umpires:
Paul Walker (GBR)
Aziz Adimah (GHA)

20 August 2014
16:30

New Zealand	6–3	Germany
Robbie Capizzi 10'; Brydon 13'; Thomas 20'; Newman 23'; Phillips 33', 35'	Report	Schneider 17', 29'; Korber 19'

Umpires:
Scott Embry (AUS)
Oliver Tarnoczi (AUT)

21 August 2014
16:00

Germany	4–2	Mexico
Schneider 9', 21'; Grossmann 28'; Korber 35'	Report	Othon 12'; Chavez 36'

Umpires:
Rawi Anbananthan (MAS)
Sompop Boonsong (THA)

9th-place match

25 August 2014
16:00

Bangladesh	4 – 5	Germany
Uddin 15'; Babu 16', 36'; Emon 20'	Report	Wenzel 3'; Lampe 12'; Strzys 21', 23'; Schneider 35'

Umpires:
Scott Embry (AUS)
Aziz Adimah (GHA)

=== Girls' tournament ===
Roster

- Kyra Angerer
- Alena Baumgarten
- Lara Bittel
- Henrike Duthweiler
- Luisa Hohenhövel
- Anna Jeltsch
- Jana Pacyna
- Thea Scheidl
- Rieke Schulte

Group Stage

Pos	Team	Pld	W	D	L	GF	GA	GD	Pts	Qualification
1	China	4	4	0	0	29	3	+26	12	Quarterfinals
2	Uruguay	4	3	0	1	19	8	+11	9	Quarterfinals
3	New Zealand	4	2	0	2	20	20	0	6	Quarterfinals
4	Germany	4	1	0	3	8	23	−15	3	Quarterfinals
5	Zambia	4	0	0	4	8	30	−22	0	

Source: FIH
Rules for classification: 1) points; 2) goal difference; 3) goals scored; 4) head-to-head result.

17 August 2014
19:30

Germany	2 – 6	Uruguay
Angerer 2'; Bittel 29'	Report	Castro 9'; Casarotti 11'; Agazzi 13'; Casarotti 28'; Barrandeguy 31'; Algotra 34'

Umpires:
Ana Faias (POR)
Denise Pelletier (CAN)

19 August 2014
17:30

Germany	1 – 4	New Zealand
Angerer 20'	Report	Hyatt Brown 11', 14'; Tinning 26'; Robinson 28'

Umpires:
Toh Li Min (SIN)
Tanja Schafer (RSA)

20 August 2014
21:00

Zambia	2 – 5	Germany
Kalomo 2'; Mambwe 33'	Report	Angerer 9'; Hohenhövel 14'; Jeltsch 29'; Baumgarten 31'; Scheidl 34'

Umpires:
Liu Lijie (CHN)
Toh Li Min (SIN)

21 August 2014
20:30

Germany	0 – 11	China
	Report	Zhang J. 3', 4', 11', 29'; Tu 8', 10'; Zhong 9'; Li 11', 31'; Chen 15'; Zhang X. 28'

Umpires:
Denise Pelletier (CAN)
Lucy Townend (NZL)

Quarterfinal

23 August 2014
16:00

Netherlands	8 – 1	Germany
Matla 11', 20'; Veen 13', 30'; Kerstholt 18', 27'; Fillet 29', 35'	Report	Hohenhövel 1'

Umpires:
Liu Lijie (CHN)
Tanja Schafer (RSA)

Classification 5th-8th place

24 August 2014
16:30

Germany	0 – 2	Uruguay
	Report	Casarotti 1'; Barrandeguy 13'

Umpires:
Denise Pelletier (CAN)
Lucy Townend (NZL)

7th-place match

26 August 2014
16:00

Germany	6 – 1	South Africa
Scheidl 5'; Angerer 12', 14'; Jeltsch 18', 30'; Hohenhövel 24'	Match Report	Marais 9'

== Golf ==
Germany qualified one team of two athletes based on the 8 June 2014 IGF Combined World Amateur Golf Rankings.

Individual

Athlete	Event	Round 1		Round 2			Round 3			Total		
Athlete	Event	Score	Rank	Score	Total	Rank	Score	Total	Rank	Score	To Par	Rank
Jonas Liebich	Boys	69	5	77	146	25	66	212	1	242	-4	5
Olivia Cowan	Girls	76	22	69	145	3	69	214	4	214	-2	4

Team

Athletes	Event	Round 1 (Foursome)		Round 2 (Fourball)			Round 3 (Individual Stroke)				Total	
Athletes	Event	Score	Rank	Score	Total	Rank	Boy	Girl	Total	Rank	Score	Rank
Jonas Liebich; Olivia Cowan	Mixed	63	3	72	135	7	69	72	139	7	276	6

== Gymnastics ==
=== Artistic Gymnastics ===
Germany qualified one athlete based on its performance at the 2014 European MAG Championships and another athlete based on its performance at the 2014 European WAG Championships.

Boys

Athlete	Event	Apparatus						Total	Rank
Athlete	Event	F	PH	R	V	PB	HB	Total	Rank
Nils Dunkel	Qualification	12.750	13.400	13.200	14.150	13.400 Q	13.050	79.950	9 Q

Individual finals

Athlete	Event	Apparatus						Total	Rank
Athlete	Event	F	PH	R	V	PB	HB	Total	Rank
Nils Dunkel	All-around	13.550	12.850	11.900	13.550	13.050	12.750	77.650	12
Nils Dunkel	Parallel bars	—N/a				13.300	—N/a	13.300	8

Girls

Athlete	Event	Apparatus				Total	Rank
Athlete	Event	F	V	UB	BB	Total	Rank
Antonia Alicke	Qualification	12.750 Q	13.425	12.350 Q	12.750	51.400	7 Q

Individual finals

Athlete	Event	Apparatus				Total	Rank
Athlete	Event	F	V	UB	BB	Total	Rank
Antonia Alicke	All-around	12.250	13.475	12.350	12.600	50.675	9
Antonia Alicke	Floor	13.066	—N/a			13.066	5
Antonia Alicke	Uneven bars	—N/a		12.633	—N/a	12.633	4

== Judo ==
Germany qualified one athlete based on its performance at the 2013 Cadet World Judo Championships.

Individual

Athlete	Event	Round of 16	Quarterfinals	Semifinals	Rep 1	Rep 2	Rep 3	Final / BM	Rank
Athlete	Event	Opposition Result	Opposition Result	Opposition Result	Opposition Result	Opposition Result	Opposition Result	Opposition Result	Rank
Domenik Schoenefeldt	Boys' -100 kg	—N/a		Safaviyeh (IRI); L 0001-000	—N/a			Basile (ARG); W 101-0001	3rd place, bronze medalist(s)
Jennifer Schwille	Girls' -63 kg	Szarzecova (CZE); W 1011-0002	Klimkait (CAN); L 0000-0013	Did not advance	—N/a	Piovesana (GBR); W 100-0002	Sunjevic (MNE); W 0112-000	Mullenberg (NED); W 100-000	3rd place, bronze medalist(s)

Team

Athletes	Event	Round of 16	Quarterfinals	Semifinals	Final	Rank
Athletes	Event	Opposition Result	Opposition Result	Opposition Result	Opposition Result	Rank
Team Berghmans; Anri Egutidze (POR); Edlene Mondelly (HAI); Michaela Polleres (AUT); Pamela Quizhpi (ECU); Domenik Schonefeldt (GER); Adela Szarzecova (CZE); Wu Zhiqiang (CHN)	Mixed Team	Team Kerr (MIX); W 4 – 3	Team Xian (MIX); L 3 – 4	did not advance		5
Team Kerr; Sophie Berger (BEL); Karla Lorenzana (GUA); Saliou Ndiaye (SEN); Jennifer Schwille (GER); Oussama Snoussi (TUN); Pawel Wawrzyczek (POL); Bauyrzhan Zhauyntayev (KAZ)	Mixed Team	Team Berghmans (MIX); L 2 – 4	did not advance			9

== Modern Pentathlon ==
Germany qualified one athlete based on its performance at the 2014 Youth A World Championships.

Athlete	Event	Fencing Ranking Round (épée one touch)		Swimming (200 m freestyle)			Fencing Final Round (épée one touch)		Combined: Shooting/Running (10 m air pistol)/(3000 m)			Total Points	Final Rank
Athlete	Event	Results	Rank	Time	Rank	Points	Rank	Points	Time	Rank	Points	Total Points	Final Rank
Anna Matthes	Girls' Individual	17–6	4	2:22.23	13	274	4	290	13:54.21	7	466	1031	3rd place, bronze medalist(s)
Anna Matthes (GER); Daniel Lopes (POR)	Mixed Relay	20–26	18	2:01.86	7	335	16	255	12:51.87	20	529	1119	20

== Rowing ==
Germany qualified two boats based on its performance at the 2013 World Rowing Junior Championships.

Athlete	Event	Heats		Repechage		Semifinals		Final	
Athlete	Event	Time	Rank	Time	Rank	Time	Rank	Time	Rank
Tim Naske	Boys' Single Sculls	3:26.06	1 SA/B	—N/a		3:22.69	1 FA	3:21.22	1st place, gold medalist(s)
Bea Bliemel; Carlotta Schmitz	Girls' Pairs	3:34.87	3 R	3:40.59	3 FB	—N/a		3:48.26	8

Qualification Legend: FA=Final A (medal); FB=Final B (non-medal); FC=Final C (non-medal); FD=Final D (non-medal); SA/B=Semifinals A/B; SC/D=Semifinals C/D; R=Repechage

== Shooting ==
Germany qualified one shooter based on its performance at the 2014 European Shooting Championships.

Individual

Athlete	Event	Qualification		Final	
Athlete	Event	Points	Rank	Points	Rank
Julia Budde	Girls' 10m Air Rifle	416.1	3 Q	186.3	3rd place, bronze medalist(s)

Team

Athletes	Event	Qualification		Round of 16	Quarterfinals	Semifinals	Final / BM	Rank
Athletes	Event	Points	Rank	Opposition Result	Opposition Result	Opposition Result	Opposition Result	Rank
Julia Budde (GER); Lucas Deciclia (ARG)	Mixed Team 10m Air Rifle	815.5	9 Q	Tahlak (UAE); Suppini (ITA); W 10–4	Russo (ARG); Valdes Martinez (MEX); L 7–10	did not advance		5

== Swimming ==
Germany qualified eight swimmers.

Boys

Athlete	Event	Heat		Semifinal		Final	
Athlete	Event	Time	Rank	Time	Rank	Time	Rank
Damian Wierling	50 m freestyle	23.19	10 Q	22.80	6 Q	22.82	6
Damian Wierling	100 m freestyle	50.65	9 Q	50.42	8 Q	49.07	3rd place, bronze medalist(s)
Damian Wierling	200 m freestyle	1:50.70	4 Q	—N/a		1:48.91	3rd place, bronze medalist(s)
Marek Ulrich	100 m freestyle	52.01	25	did not advance			
Marek Ulrich	50 m backstroke	26.28	10 Q	26.13	10	did not advance	
Marek Ulrich	100 m backstroke	56.30	9 Q	55.55	6 Q	55.42	7
Marek Ulrich	200 m backstroke	2:07.45	24	—N/a		did not advance	
Maximilian Pilger	50 m breaststroke	29.01	15 Q	29.10	14	did not advance	
Maximilian Pilger	100 m breaststroke	1:03.70	16 Q	1:02.58	5 Q	1:01.51	2nd place, silver medalist(s)
Maximilian Pilger	200 m breaststroke	2:14.65	2 Q	—N/a		2:11.97	4
Alexander Kunert	50 m butterfly	25.10	18	did not advance			
Alexander Kunert	100 m butterfly	54.84	8 Q	54.59	10	did not advance	
Alexander Kunert	200 m butterfly	2:05.73	16	—N/a		did not advance	
Alexander Kunert; Maximilian Pilger; Merek Ulrich; Damian Wierling	4×100 m freestyle relay	3:25.33	3 Q	—N/a		3:22.93	3rd place, bronze medalist(s)
Alexander Kunert; Maximilian Pilger; Merek Ulrich; Damian Wierling	4×100 m medley relay	3:45.55	2 Q	—N/a		3:39.30	2nd place, silver medalist(s)

Girls

Athlete	Event	Heat		Semifinal		Final	
Athlete	Event	Time	Rank	Time	Rank	Time	Rank
Mandy Feldbinder	50 m freestyle	27.08	29	did not advance			
Mandy Feldbinder	100 m freestyle	57.69	22	did not advance			
Mandy Feldbinder	50 m backstroke	29.72	12 Q	29.75	14	did not advance	
Mandy Feldbinder	100 m backstroke	1:03.43	16 Q	1:03.40	15	did not advance	
Mandy Feldbinder	200 m backstroke	2:17.80	15	—N/a		did not advance	
Patricia Wartenberg	100 m freestyle	58.27	25	did not advance			
Patricia Wartenberg	200 m freestyle	2:03.71	18	—N/a		did not advance	
Patricia Wartenberg	400 m freestyle	4:18.93	16	—N/a		did not advance	
Patricia Wartenberg	800 m freestyle	—N/a				8:44.61	7
Kathrin Demler	200 m freestyle	2:01.86	10	—N/a		did not advance	
Kathrin Demler	400 m freestyle	4:14.51	4 Q	—N/a		4:11.25	3rd place, bronze medalist(s)
Kathrin Demler	200 m butterfly	2:17.55	18	—N/a		did not advance	
Kathrin Demler	200 m individual medley	2:15.50	3 Q	—N/a		2:14.53	5
Julia Willers	50 m breaststroke	32.19	5 Q	31.94	2 Q	31.78	2nd place, silver medalist(s)
Julia Willers	100 m breaststroke	1:10.16	7 Q	1:09.82	7 Q	1:09.98	8
Julia Willers	200 m breaststroke	2:31.72	5 Q	—N/a		2:29.68	4
Kathrin Demler; Mady Feldbinder; Patricia Wartenberg; Julia Willers	4×100 m freestyle relay	3:53.22	7 Q	—N/a		3:51.12	6
Kathrin Demler; Mady Feldbinder; Patricia Wartenberg; Julia Willers	4×100 m medley relay	4:12.50	5 Q	—N/a		4:10.54	4

Mixed

Athlete	Event	Heat		Final	
Athlete	Event	Time	Rank	Time	Rank
Mandy Feldbinder; Marek Ulrich; Patricia Wartenberg; Damian Wierling	4×100 m freestyle relay	3:37.18	7 Q	3:36.51	7

== Table Tennis ==
Germany qualified a male athlete from the 2014 World Qualification Event and a female athlete from the Under-18 World Rankings.

Singles

Athlete	Event	Group Stage	Rank	Round of 16	Quarterfinals	Semifinals	Final / BM	Rank
Athlete	Event	Opposition Score	Rank	Opposition Score	Opposition Score	Opposition Score	Opposition Score	Rank
Kilian Ort	Boys	Group B Johnson (SKN); W 11–3, 11–10, 11–5	2 Q	Chen (POR); W 9–11, 6–11, 11–9, 10–12, 14–12, 11–8, 11–6	Yang (TPE); L 5–11, 9–11, 8–11, 8–11	did not advance		5
Kilian Ort	Boys	Muramatsu (JPN); L 5–11, 7–11, 9–11	2 Q	Chen (POR); W 9–11, 6–11, 11–9, 10–12, 14–12, 11–8, 11–6	Yang (TPE); L 5–11, 9–11, 8–11, 8–11	did not advance		5
Kilian Ort	Boys	Allegro (BEL); W 11–7, 11–5, 9–11, 11–8	2 Q	Chen (POR); W 9–11, 6–11, 11–9, 10–12, 14–12, 11–8, 11–6	Yang (TPE); L 5–11, 9–11, 8–11, 8–11	did not advance		5
Yuan Wan	Girls	Group G Ryabova (KAZ); W 11–8, 5–11, 11–2, 11–8	3 qB	Consolation round Yee (SIN); W 12–10, 8–11, 13–11, 11–7	Consolation round Zarif (FRA); W 11–7, 11–9, 11–8	Consolation round Stefcova (CZE); W 7–11, 11–6, 11–9, 11–4	Consolation round Piccolin (ITA); W 11–3, 11–7, 11–5	17
Yuan Wan	Girls	Diaconu (ROU); L 8–11, 1–11, 3–11	3 qB	Consolation round Yee (SIN); W 12–10, 8–11, 13–11, 11–7	Consolation round Zarif (FRA); W 11–7, 11–9, 11–8	Consolation round Stefcova (CZE); W 7–11, 11–6, 11–9, 11–4	Consolation round Piccolin (ITA); W 11–3, 11–7, 11–5	17
Yuan Wan	Girls	Lorenzotti (URU); L 11–8, 11–9, 3–11, 5–11, 9–11	3 qB	Consolation round Yee (SIN); W 12–10, 8–11, 13–11, 11–7	Consolation round Zarif (FRA); W 11–7, 11–9, 11–8	Consolation round Stefcova (CZE); W 7–11, 11–6, 11–9, 11–4	Consolation round Piccolin (ITA); W 11–3, 11–7, 11–5	17

Team

Athletes	Event	Group Stage	Rank	Round of 16	Quarterfinals	Semifinals	Final / BM	Rank
Athletes	Event	Opposition Score	Rank	Opposition Score	Opposition Score	Opposition Score	Opposition Score	Rank
Germany; Yuan Wan (GER); Kilian Ort (GER)	Mixed	Lagsir (ALG); Ben Yahia (TUN); W 3–0	2 Q	Khetkuan (THA); Tanviriyavechakul (THA); L 1–2	did not advance			9
Germany; Yuan Wan (GER); Kilian Ort (GER)	Mixed	Lorenzotti (URU); Calderano (BRA); L 0–3	2 Q	Khetkuan (THA); Tanviriyavechakul (THA); L 1–2	did not advance			9
Germany; Yuan Wan (GER); Kilian Ort (GER)	Mixed	Piccolin (ITA); Schmid (SUI); W 3–0	2 Q	Khetkuan (THA); Tanviriyavechakul (THA); L 1–2	did not advance			9

Qualification Legend: Q=Main Bracket (medal); qB=Consolation Bracket (non-medal)

== Taekwondo ==
Germany qualified four athletes based on its performance at the Taekwondo Qualification Tournament.

Boys

Athlete	Event	Round of 16	Quarterfinals	Semifinals	Final	Rank
Athlete	Event	Opposition Result	Opposition Result	Opposition Result	Opposition Result	Rank
Daniel Chiovetta	−48 kg	Bye	Navarro (ARG); W 16–4	Wang (TPE); L 9–14	Did not advance	3rd place, bronze medalist(s)
Hamza Adnan Karim	−73 kg	—N/a	El Attari (MAR); W 12 (PTG)–0	Salehimehr (IRI); W 14–9	Guliyev (AZE); L 4–10	2nd place, silver medalist(s)

Girls

Athlete	Event	Round of 16	Quarterfinals	Semifinals	Final	Rank
Athlete	Event	Opposition Result	Opposition Result	Opposition Result	Opposition Result	Rank
Giuliana Federici	−44 kg	Bye	Chen (TPE); L 3–6	did not advance		5
Madeline Folgmann	−55 kg	Bogdanović (SRB); L 12–16	did not advance			9

== Triathlon ==
Germany qualified two athletes based on its performance at the 2014 European Youth Olympic Games Qualifier.

Individual

Athlete	Event	Swim (750m)	Trans 1	Bike (20 km)	Trans 2	Run (5 km)	Total Time	Rank
Peer Sonksen	Boys	9:38	0:44	28:41	0:22	15:32	54:57	4
Kristin Ranwig	Girls	10:09	0:46	31:40	0:23	18:20	1:01:18	4

Relay

Athlete	Event	Total Times per Athlete (Swim 250m, Bike 6.6 km, Run 1.8 km)	Total Group Time	Rank
Europe 1 Kristin Ranwig (GER); Emil Deleuran Hansen (DEN); Emilie Morier (FRA); Ben Dijkstra (GBR)	Mixed Relay	21:49; 19:25; 21:43; 19:20	1:22:17	1st place, gold medalist(s)
Europe 2 Elizaveta Zhizhina (RUS); Alberto Gonzalez Garcia (ESP); Kirsten Nuyes (NED); Peer Sonksen (GER)	Mixed Relay	21:39; 19:33; 23:12; 19:51	1:24:15	5

== Weightlifting ==
Germany qualified 1 quota in the boys' events based on the team ranking after the 2014 Weightlifting Youth European Championships.

Boys

Athlete	Event	Snatch		Clean & jerk		Total	Rank
Athlete	Event	Result	Rank	Result	Rank	Total	Rank
Marcus Sadey	−69 kg	105	10	137	8	242	8

== Wrestling ==
Germany qualified two athletes based on its performance at the 2014 European Cadet Championships.

Key:
- VT - Victory by Fall.
- PP - Decision by Points - the loser with technical points.
- PO - Decision by Points - the loser without technical points.

Boys

Athlete	Event	Group stage				Final / RM	Rank
Athlete	Event	Opposition Score	Opposition Score	Opposition Score	Rank	Opposition Score	Rank
Karan Mosebach	Greco-Roman -69kg	Soto (PER); W 4–0	Marshall (NZL); W 4–0	Manville (USA); L 1–3	2	Bronze Medal Match; Polivadov (KAZ); L 1–3 ^{PP}	4
