= Swimming at the 2014 Summer Youth Olympics – Boys' 50 metre breaststroke =

Boys' 50 metre breaststroke at the 2014 Summer Youth Olympics
- Venue: Nanjing Olympic Sports Centre
- Dates: 21 August (heats, semifinals); 22 August (final)
- Competitors: 38 from 36 nations
- Winning time: 27.83

Medalists
gold medal	Nikola Obrovac	Croatia
silver medal	Carlos Claverie	Venezuela
bronze medal	Anton Chupkov	Russia

The boys' 50 metre breaststroke event in swimming at the 2014 Summer Youth Olympics took place on 21 and 22 August at the Nanjing Olympic Sports Centre in Nanjing, China.

== Results ==
=== Heats ===
The heats were held at 10:33.

Rank	Heat	Lane	Name	Nationality	Time	Notes
1	5	6	Nikola Obrovac	Croatia	27.97	Q
2	3	4	Carlos Claverie	Venezuela	28.19	Q
3	4	5	Anton Chupkov	Russia	28.51	Q
4	4	4	Jarred Crous	South Africa	28.66	Q
5	5	3	Mohamed Khalaf	Egypt	28.71	Q
6	2	2	Zhang Zhihao	China	28.75	Q
6	5	4	Stanislau Pazdzeyeu	Belarus	28.75	Q
8	3	2	Ippei Watanabe	Japan	28.83	Q
9	4	3	Kim Jae-youn	South Korea	28.89	Q
10	2	5	Andrey Pravdivtsev	Uzbekistan	28.90	Q
11	5	5	Yauhen Kavaliou	Belarus	28.92	Q
12	5	8	Grayson Bell	Australia	28.96	Q
13	3	3	Dávid Horváth	Hungary	28.97	Q
14	4	8	Josué Domínguez	Dominican Republic	28.99	Q
15	3	1	Maximilian Pilger	Germany	29.01	Q
16	4	2	Jordy Groters	Aruba	29.03	Q
17	4	1	Jakob Nordman	Finland	29.15	
18	5	1	Basten Caerts	Belgium	29.16	
19	3	6	Andreas Mickosz	Brazil	29.17	
20	4	7	Dmitriy Goverdovskiy	Kazakhstan	29.21	
21	2	6	Andrei Roman	Romania	29.25	
22	3	5	Jean Dencausse	France	29.34	
23	5	2	Dustin Tynes	Bahamas	29.35	
24	3	7	Luca Pfyffer	Switzerland	29.49	
25	1	4	Meli Malani	Fiji	29.59	
26	2	3	Jesús Flores	Honduras	29.69	
27	4	6	Vojtěch Simbartl	Czech Republic	29.98	
28	2	1	Jacob Garrod	New Zealand	30.04	
28	3	8	Julian Harding	Malta	30.04	
30	2	7	Yuta Sato	Japan	30.09	
31	5	7	Cai Bing-rong	Chinese Taipei	30.16	
32	1	5	Luis Jasso	Mexico	30.25	
33	2	8	Arnoldo Herrera	Costa Rica	30.34	
34	2	4	Lim Ching Hwang	Malaysia	30.63	
35	1	3	Walid Daloul	Qatar	30.83	
36	1	2	Kerry Ollivierre	Grenada	32.45	
37	1	7	Fabrice Zeutsop	Cameroon	40.01	
38	1	6	Abdoul Nignan	Burkina Faso	40.08	

=== Semifinals ===
The semifinals were held at 18:50.

Rank	Heat	Lane	Name	Nationality	Time	Notes
1	2	4	Nikola Obrovac	Croatia	28.00	Q
2	1	4	Carlos Claverie	Venezuela	28.19	Q
3	2	5	Anton Chupkov	Russia	28.50	Q
4	1	3	Zhang Zhihao	China	28.57	Q
5	2	1	Dávid Horváth	Hungary	28.66	Q
6	1	6	Ippei Watanabe	Japan	28.74	Q
7	1	5	Jarred Crous	South Africa	28.79	Q
8	2	3	Mohamed Khalaf	Egypt	28.84	Q
9	1	7	Grayson Bell	Australia	28.86	
10	2	2	Kim Jae-youn	South Korea	28.89	
11	1	8	Jordy Groters	Aruba	28.90	
12	2	6	Stanislau Pazdzeyeu	Belarus	28.93	
13	1	2	Andrey Pravdivtsev	Uzbekistan	29.07	
14	2	8	Maximilian Pilger	Germany	29.10	
15	1	1	Josue Dominguez Ramos	Dominican Republic	29.12	
16	2	7	Yauhen Kavaliou	Belarus	29.15	

=== Final ===
The final was held at 19:18.

Rank	Lane	Name	Nationality	Time	Notes
1st place, gold medalist(s)	4	Nikola Obrovac	Croatia	27.83	
2nd place, silver medalist(s)	5	Carlos Claverie	Venezuela	27.94	
3rd place, bronze medalist(s)	3	Anton Chupkov	Russia	28.43	
4	1	Jarred Crous	South Africa	28.46	
5	2	Dávid Horváth	Hungary	28.67	
6	6	Zhang Zhihao	China	28.72	
7	7	Ippei Watanabe	Japan	28.77	
8	8	Mohamed Khalaf	Egypt	28.87	
