= Swimming at the 2014 Summer Youth Olympics – Boys' 100 metre backstroke =

Boys' 100 metre backstroke at the 2014 Summer Youth Olympics
- Venue: Nanjing Olympic Sports Centre
- Dates: 17 August (heats, semifinals); 18 August (final)
- Competitors: 34 from 32 nations
- Winning time: 54.24

Medalists
| gold medal | Evgeny Rylov | Russia |
| gold medal | Simone Sabbioni | Italy |
| bronze medal | Li Guangyuan | China |

The boys' 100 metre backstroke event in swimming at the 2014 Summer Youth Olympics took place on 17 and 18 August at the Nanjing Olympic Sports Centre in Nanjing, China.

== Results ==
=== Heats ===
The heats were held at 10:31.

| Rank | Heat | Lane | Name | Nationality | Time | Notes |
|---|---|---|---|---|---|---|
| 1 | 5 | 5 | Li Guangyuan | China | 55.33 | Q |
| 2 | 5 | 7 | Robert Glință | Romania | 55.46 | Q |
| 3 | 5 | 4 | Simone Sabbioni | Italy | 55.47 | Q |
| 4 | 3 | 4 | Evgeny Rylov | Russia | 55.78 | Q |
| 5 | 4 | 3 | Luke Greenbank | Great Britain | 55.94 | Q |
| 6 | 4 | 4 | Apostolos Christou | Greece | 55.99 | Q |
| 7 | 5 | 6 | Christopher Reid | South Africa | 56.25 | Q |
| 8 | 5 | 8 | Patrick Mulcare | United States | 56.28 | Q |
| 9 | 3 | 3 | Marek Ulrich | Germany | 56.30 | Q |
| 10 | 3 | 6 | Nic Groenewald | Australia | 56.35 | Q |
| 11 | 5 | 3 | Laurent Bams | Netherlands | 56.47 | Q |
| 12 | 4 | 7 | Patrick Conaton | United States | 56.59 | Q |
| 13 | 4 | 5 | Vitor Guaraldo | Brazil | 56.73 | Q |
| 14 | 2 | 4 | Javier Acevedo | Canada | 56.77 | Q |
| 15 | 5 | 2 | Filipp Shopin | Russia | 56.94 | Q |
| 16 | 4 | 2 | Petter Fredriksson | Sweden | 56.96 | Q |
| 17 | 3 | 5 | Jānis Šaltāns | Latvia | 57.00 | |
| 18 | 3 | 2 | Andrii Khloptsov | Ukraine | 57.06 | |
| 19 | 4 | 6 | Armin Porobic | Norway | 57.14 | |
| 20 | 4 | 8 | Žan Pogačar | Slovenia | 57.46 | |
| 21 | 5 | 1 | Ricky Anggawidjaja | Indonesia | 57.50 | |
| 22 | 3 | 8 | Robinson Molina | Venezuela | 57.74 | |
| 23 | 4 | 1 | Yeziel Morales | Puerto Rico | 57.79 | |
| 24 | 3 | 7 | Trần Duy Khôi | Vietnam | 57.80 | |
| 25 | 1 | 5 | Berk Özkul | Turkey | 57.87 | |
| 26 | 3 | 1 | Kristinn Þórarinsson | Iceland | 57.98 | |
| 27 | 2 | 2 | David McLeod | Trinidad and Tobago | 58.18 | |
| 28 | 2 | 5 | Lau Shiu Yue | Hong Kong | 58.40 | |
| 29 | 2 | 6 | Karl Luht | Estonia | 58.62 | |
| 30 | 2 | 7 | Danail Slavchev | Bulgaria | 58.91 | |
| 31 | 1 | 4 | Lushano Lamprecht | Namibia | 58.94 | |
| 32 | 1 | 3 | Raham Peiravani | Iran | 58.96 | |
| 33 | 2 | 1 | Timothy Wynter | Jamaica | 59.21 | |
| 34 | 2 | 3 | Song Suk-gyu | South Korea | 59.55 | |

=== Semifinals ===
The semifinals were held at 18:15.

| Rank | Heat | Lane | Name | Nationality | Time | Notes |
|---|---|---|---|---|---|---|
| 1 | 2 | 5 | Simone Sabbioni | Italy | 54.48 | Q |
| 2 | 2 | 4 | Li Guangyuan | China | 54.52 | Q |
| 3 | 1 | 5 | Evgeny Rylov | Russia | 54.86 | Q |
| 4 | 1 | 3 | Apostolos Christou | Greece | 55.09 | Q |
| 5 | 1 | 4 | Robert Glință | Romania | 55.10 | Q |
| 6 | 2 | 2 | Marek Ulrich | Germany | 55.55 | Q |
| 7 | 2 | 3 | Luke Greenbank | Great Britain | 55.70 | Q |
| 8 | 1 | 6 | Patrick Mulcare | United States | 55.86 | Q |
| 9 | 1 | 2 | Nic Groenewald | Australia | 55.99 | |
| 9 | 2 | 6 | Christopher Reid | South Africa | 55.99 | |
| 11 | 2 | 7 | Laurent Bams | Netherlands | 56.03 | |
| 12 | 2 | 1 | Vitor Guaraldo | Brazil | 56.27 | |
| 13 | 2 | 8 | Filipp Shopin | Russia | 56.38 | |
| 14 | 1 | 7 | Patrick Conaton | United States | 56.95 | |
| 15 | 1 | 8 | Petter Fredriksson | Sweden | 57.11 | |
| 16 | 1 | 1 | Javier Acevedo | Canada | 57.34 | |

=== Final ===
The final was held at 18:00.

| Rank | Lane | Name | Nationality | Time | Notes |
|---|---|---|---|---|---|
| 1st place, gold medalist(s) | 3 | Evgeny Rylov | Russia | 54.24 | |
| 1st place, gold medalist(s) | 4 | Simone Sabbioni | Italy | 54.24 | |
| 3rd place, bronze medalist(s) | 5 | Li Guangyuan | China | 54.56 | |
| 4 | 6 | Apostolos Christou | Greece | 55.06 | |
| 5 | 2 | Robert Glință | Romania | 55.21 | |
| 6 | 1 | Luke Greenbank | Great Britain | 55.38 | |
| 7 | 7 | Marek Ulrich | Germany | 55.42 | |
| 8 | 8 | Patrick Mulcare | United States | 58.08 | |
