= Modern pentathlon at the 2014 Summer Youth Olympics =

Modern pentathlon at the II Summer Youth Olympic Games
- Venue: Nanjing Olympic Sports Centre
- Dates: 22–26 August

Modern pentathlon at the 2014 Summer Youth Olympics was held from 22 to 26 August at the Nanjing Olympic Sports Centre in Nanjing, China.

== Qualification ==
Each National Olympic Committee (NOC) can enter a maximum of 2 competitors, 1 per each gender. As hosts, China was initially given the maximum quota, but only selected a female athlete and a further 4, 2 in each gender was initially given to the Tripartite Commission, but none were selected. The spots were reallocated to the world rankings. The remaining 42 places shall be decided in three stages; firstly four continental qualification tournaments held in 2013, second the 2014 World Youth A Championships and finally the Olympic Youth A Pentathlon World Rankings.

Each athlete will compete in both the individual and mixed events. To be eligible to participate at the Youth Olympics athletes must have been born between 1 January 1996 and 31 December 1999.

=== Boys ===
| Event | Location | Date | Total Places | Qualified |
|---|---|---|---|---|
| Host Nation | - | - | 0 | ~~China~~ |
| European Youth Olympic Games Qualifications | (Portugal) Caldas da Rainha | 19–22 September 2013 | 3 | Gergely Regos (HUN); Gianluca Micozzi (ITA); Alexander Lifanov (RUS) |
| Asia and Oceania YOG Qualification Competition | (Kazakhstan) Astana | 27–28 September 2013 | 2 | Artem Drobotov (KAZ); Gilung Park (KOR) |
| Asia and Oceania YOG Qualification Competition | (Kazakhstan) Astana | 27–28 September 2013 | 1 | Max Esposito (AUS) |
| Africa YOG Qualification | (Ivory Coast) Abidjan | 8–10 November 2013 | 1 | Sherif Nazier (EGY) |
| PANAM Youth Olympic Qualification | (Mexico) Acapulco | 30 Nov.–1 Dec. 2013 | 2 | Ricardo Vera (MEX); Berengerth Seguera (VEN) |
| Youth A World Championships | (Hungary) Budapest | 14–18 May 2014 | 8 | Gustav Gustenau (AUT); Mikita Harnastaeu (BLR); Martin Vlach (CZE); Gabriel Cianelli (FRA); Dovidas Vaivada (LTU); Bartosz Hoffmann (POL); Anton Kuznetsov (UKR); Brendan Anderson (USA) |
| Olympic Youth A Pentathlon World Ranking | - | 1 June 2014 | 7 | Yavor Peshleevski (BUL); Henry Choong (GBR); Wilhelm Hengstenberg (GUA); Radion Khripchenko (KGZ); Nikita Bistrovs (LAT); Daniel Lopes (POR); Joan Gispert (ESP) |
| TOTAL | | | 24 | |

=== Girls ===
| Event | Location | Date | Total Places | Qualified |
|---|---|---|---|---|
| Host Nation | - | - | 1 | Zhong Xiuting (CHN) |
| European Youth Olympic Games Qualifications | (Portugal) Caldas da Rainha | 19–22 September 2013 | 3 | Francesca Summers (GBR); Aurelija Tamasauskaite (LTU); Adelina Ibatullina (RUS) |
| Asia and Oceania YOG Qualification Competition | (Kazakhstan) Astana | 27–28 September 2013 | 2 | Juhye Choi (KOR); Valerya Uvarova (KGZ) |
| Asia and Oceania YOG Qualification Competition | (Kazakhstan) Astana | 27–28 September 2013 | 1 | Marina Carrier (AUS) |
| Africa YOG Qualification | (Ivory Coast) Abidjan | 8–10 November 2013 | 1 | Haydy Morsy (EGY) |
| PANAM Youth Olympic Qualification | (Mexico) Acapulco | 30 Nov.–1 Dec. 2013 | 2 | Javiera Rosas (CHI); Isabel Brand (GUA) |
| Youth A World Championships | (Hungary) Budapest | 14–18 May 2014 | 8 | Iryna Prasiantsova (BLR); Jolana Hojsakova (CZE); Anna Matthes (GER); Anna Zs Toth (HUN); Aurora Tognetti (ITA); Aroa Freije (ESP); Ilke Ozyuksel (TUR); Yana Polishchuk (UKR) |
| Olympic Youth A Pentathlon World Ranking | - | 1 June 2014 | 6 | Ailen Cisneros (ARG); Kali Sayers (CAN); Laure Roset (FRA); Olessya Mylnikova (KAZ); Martha Derrant (MEX); Maria Migueis (POR) |
| TOTAL | | | 24 | |

== Schedule ==
The schedule was released by the Nanjing Youth Olympic Games Organizing Committee.

All times are CST (UTC+8)

| Event date | Event day | Starting time | Event details |
|---|---|---|---|
| August 22 | Friday | 10:00 | Girls' Fencing (round robin) |
| August 22 | Friday | 14:00 | Boys' Fencing (round robin) |
| August 23 | Saturday | 14:30 | Girls' Swimming |
| August 23 | Saturday | 16:00 | Girls' Fencing (Ladder System) |
| August 23 | Saturday | 17:30 | Girls' Combined Event |
| August 24 | Sunday | 14:30 | Boys' Swimming |
| August 24 | Sunday | 16:00 | Boys' Fencing (Ladder System) |
| August 24 | Sunday | 17:30 | Boys' Combined Event |
| August 26 | Tuesday | 08:30 | Mixed Relay Fencing (round robin) |
| August 26 | Tuesday | 13:30 | Mixed Relay Swimming |
| August 26 | Tuesday | 15:00 | Mixed Relay Fencing (Ladder System) |
| August 26 | Tuesday | 17:30 | Mixed Relay Combined Event |

== Medal summary ==
=== Medal table ===
* Host nation (China)

| Rank | Nation | Gold | Silver | Bronze | Total |
|---|---|---|---|---|---|
| 1 | Mixed-NOCs | 1 | 1 | 1 | 3 |
| 2 | China* | 1 | 0 | 0 | 1 |
| 2 | Russia | 1 | 0 | 0 | 1 |
| 4 | Great Britain | 0 | 1 | 0 | 1 |
| 4 | Hungary | 0 | 1 | 0 | 1 |
| 6 | Germany | 0 | 0 | 1 | 1 |
| 6 | Lithuania | 0 | 0 | 1 | 1 |
| Totals (7 entries) | | 3 | 3 | 3 | 9 |

=== Events ===
| Event | Gold | Silver | Bronze |
|---|---|---|---|
| Boys' individual | Alexander Lifanov; Russia | Gergely Regős; Hungary | Dovydas Vaivada; Lithuania |
| Girls' individual | Zhong Xiuting; China | Francesca Summers; Great Britain | Anna Matthes; Germany |
| Mixed relay | Maria Teixeira; Portugal; Anton Kuznetsov; Ukraine | Anna Tóth; Hungary; Ricardo Vera; Mexico | Aurora Tognetti; Italy; Park Gi-lung; South Korea |
