= Swimming at the 2014 Summer Youth Olympics – Boys' 200 metre freestyle =

Boys' 200 metre freestyle at the 2014 Summer Youth Olympics
- Venue: Nanjing Olympic Sports Centre
- Dates: 18 August
- Competitors: 32 from 28 nations
- Winning time: 1:48.45

Medalists
gold medal	Nicolangelo Di Fabio	Italy
silver medal	Kyle Stolk	Netherlands
bronze medal	Damian Wierling	Germany

The boys' 200 metre freestyle event in swimming at the 2014 Summer Youth Olympics took place on 18 August at the Nanjing Olympic Sports Centre in Nanjing, China.

== Results ==
=== Heats ===
The heats were held at 10:47.

Rank	Heat	Lane	Name	Nationality	Time	Notes
1	5	4	Nicolangelo Di Fabio	Italy	1:50.08	Q
2	4	4	Kyle Stolk	Netherlands	1:50.32	Q
3	5	5	Luiz Altamir Melo	Brazil	1:50.58	Q
4	4	5	Damian Wierling	Germany	1:50.70	Q
5	3	5	Joshua Steyn	South Africa	1:50.79	Q
6	5	2	Ido Haber	Israel	1:50.84	Q
7	3	4	Duncan Scott	Great Britain	1:51.23	Q
8	3	1	Patrick Mulcare	United States	1:51.33	Q
9	3	8	Javier Acevedo	Canada	1:51.41	
10	5	3	Lim Ching Hwang	Malaysia	1:51.49	
11	3	3	Martyn Walton	Great Britain	1:51.73	
12	4	3	Henrik Christiansen	Norway	1:51.89	
13	4	2	Welson Sim	Malaysia	1:51.99	
14	4	6	Marc Vivas	Spain	1:52.31	
15	4	1	Matthew Abeysinghe	Sri Lanka	1:52.41	NR
16	2	7	Michael Mincham	New Zealand	1:52.42	
17	2	2	Marcelo Acosta	El Salvador	1:52.50	
18	5	1	Brent Szurdoki	South Africa	1:52.59	
19	3	2	Wojciech Wojdak	Poland	1:53.02	
20	3	7	Guido Buscaglia	Argentina	1:53.20	
21	2	5	Khader Baqlah	Jordan	1:53.28	
22	3	6	Alexis Borisavljevic	Belgium	1:53.53	
23	5	6	Juan Marín	Spain	1:53.58	
24	5	8	Tanakrit Kittiya	Thailand	1:53.77	
25	2	6	Ricardo Vargas	Mexico	1:54.18	
26	5	7	Petr Novák	Czech Republic	1:54.74	
27	2	3	Mohamed Lagili	Tunisia	1:54.81	
28	2	4	Anthony Selby	Barbados	1:56.34	
29	4	8	André Farinha	Portugal	1:57.38	
30	1	4	Stefan Jankulovski	Macedonia	1:58.46	
31	1	3	Lorance Alsabee	Syria	2:00.07	
32	1	5	Noah Mascoll-Gomes	Antigua and Barbuda	2:01.69	
	4	7	Kyle Chalmers	Australia	DNS	

=== Final ===
The final was held at 18:09.

Rank	Lane	Name	Nationality	Time	Notes
1st place, gold medalist(s)	4	Nicolangelo Di Fabio	Italy	1:48.45	
2nd place, silver medalist(s)	5	Kyle Stolk	Netherlands	1:48.59	
3rd place, bronze medalist(s)	6	Damian Wierling	Germany	1:48.91	
4	1	Duncan Scott	Great Britain	1:49.73	
5	2	Joshua Steyn	South Africa	1:50.06	
6	7	Ido Haber	Israel	1:50.41	
7	3	Luiz Altamir Melo	Brazil	1:50.51	
8	8	Patrick Mulcare	United States	1:50.57	
