= Swimming at the 2014 Summer Youth Olympics – Boys' 100 metre freestyle =

100 metre freestyle event in swimming

Boys' 100 metre freestyle at the 2014 Summer Youth Olympics
- Venue: Nanjing Olympic Sports Centre
- Dates: 21 August (heats, semifinals); 22 August (final)
- Competitors: 37 from 34 nations
- Winning time: 48.25

Medalists
gold medal	Matheus Santana	Brazil
silver medal	Yu Hexin	China
bronze medal	Damian Wierling	Germany

The boys' 100 metre freestyle event in swimming at the 2014 Summer Youth Olympics took place on 21–22 August at the Nanjing Olympic Sports Centre in Nanjing, China.

== Results ==
=== Heats ===
The heats were held at 10:12.

Rank	Heat	Lane	Name	Nationality	Time	Notes
1	4	3	Matheus Santana	Brazil	50.15	Q
1	5	4	Yu Hexin	China	50.15	Q
3	5	3	Alessandro Bori	Italy	50.35	Q
4	2	6	Javier Acevedo	Canada	50.40	Q
5	4	2	Filipp Shopin	Russia	50.44	Q
6	3	5	Kyle Stolk	Netherlands	50.52	Q
7	3	6	Duncan Scott	Great Britain	50.60	Q
8	4	4	Jan Hołub	Poland	50.61	Q
9	3	4	Damian Wierling	Germany	50.65	Q
10	4	7	Povilas Strazdas	Lithuania	50.69	Q
11	5	5	Kyle Chalmers	Australia	50.73	Q
12	3	3	Nicolangelo Di Fabio	Italy	50.83	Q
13	2	5	Matthew Abeysinghe	Sri Lanka	50.87	Q, NR
14	3	8	Robert Glință	Romania	50.98	Q
15	5	2	Alexis Borisavljevic	Belgium	51.38	Q
16	3	1	Miles Munro	Great Britain	51.40	Q
17	5	1	Guido Buscaglia	Argentina	51.48	
18	5	7	Jānis Šaltāns	Latvia	51.57	
19	4	1	Lim Ching Hwang	Malaysia	51.64	
20	2	2	Khader Baqlah	Jordan	51.73	
21	2	4	Uroš Nikolić	Serbia	51.75	
22	5	6	Juan Marín	Spain	51.79	
23	2	7	Chad Idensohn	Zimbabwe	51.93	
24	5	8	Isak Eliasson	Sweden	51.96	
25	3	7	Marek Ulrich	Germany	52.01	
26	3	2	Fotios Mylonas	Greece	52.03	
27	4	6	Joshua Steyn	South Africa	52.19	
28	1	5	Patrick Conaton	United States	52.49	
29	1	3	Calum Bain	Ireland	52.51	
30	2	3	Zuhayr Pigot	Suriname	52.70	
31	2	1	Artyom Pukhnatiy	Uzbekistan	52.78	
32	2	8	Vahan Mkhitaryan	Armenia	53.20	
33	1	4	Raoul Stafrace	Malta	53.45	
34	1	6	Jesse Washington	Bermuda	53.89	
35	1	2	Noah Mascoll-Gomes	Antigua and Barbuda	55.22	
36	1	1	Hannibal Gaskin	Guyana	58.03	
37	1	7	Collin Akara	Papua New Guinea	58.45	
	4	5	Dylan Carter	Trinidad and Tobago	DNS	
	4	8	Darren Fang Yue Lim	Singapore	DNS	

=== Semifinals ===
The semifinals were held at 18:19.

Rank	Heat	Lane	Name	Nationality	Time	Notes
1	1	4	Matheus Santana	Brazil	49.30	Q
2	1	3	Kyle Stolk	Netherlands	49.78	Q
3	2	5	Alessandro Bori	Italy	49.91	Q
4	1	5	Javier Acevedo	Canada	50.15	Q
5	2	4	Yu Hexin	China	50.26	Q
6	2	6	Duncan Scott	Great Britain	50.33	Q
7	1	6	Jan Hołub	Poland	50.41	Q
8	2	2	Damian Wierling	Germany	50.42	Q
9	2	3	Filipp Shopin	Russia	50.58	
10	1	7	Nicolangelo Di Fabio	Italy	50.64	
11	1	2	Povilas Strazdas	Lithuania	50.66	
11	1	1	Robert Glință	Romania	50.66	
13	2	1	Matthew Abeysinghe	Sri Lanka	50.86	NR
14	1	8	Miles Munro	Great Britain	50.87	
15	2	7	Kyle Chalmers	Australia	50.92	
16	2	8	Alexis Borisavljevic	Belgium	51.54	

=== Final ===
The final was held at 18:20.

Rank	Lane	Name	Nationality	Time	Notes
1st place, gold medalist(s)	4	Matheus Santana	Brazil	48.25	WJR
2nd place, silver medalist(s)	2	Yu Hexin	China	49.06	
3rd place, bronze medalist(s)	8	Damian Wierling	Germany	49.07	
4	3	Alessandro Bori	Italy	49.65	
5	5	Kyle Stolk	Netherlands	49.83	
6	7	Duncan Scott	Great Britain	49.96	
7	1	Jan Hołub	Poland	50.01	
8	6	Javier Acevedo	Canada	50.29	
