= Athletics at the 2014 Summer Youth Olympics – Girls' shot put =

Athletics – Girls' shot put at the II Summer Youth Olympic Games
- Venue: Nanjing Olympic Sports Centre
- Date: August 21–24
- Competitors: 15 from 15 nations

Medalists
1st place, gold medalist(s)		Alena Bugakova	Russia
2nd place, silver medalist(s)		Maria Orozco Castro	Mexico
3rd place, bronze medalist(s)		Anika Nehls	Germany

The girls’ shot put competition at the 2014 Summer Youth Olympics was held on 21–24 August 2014 in Nanjing Olympic Sports Center.

== Schedule ==
Date	Time	Round
21 August 2014	20:20	Qualification
24 August 2014	20:25	Final

== Results ==
=== Qualification ===
First 50% of the athletes from the Qualification round progress to the A Final and the remaining athletes to the B Final.

Rank	Athlete	1	2	3	4	Result	Notes	Q
1	Alena Bugakova (RUS)	17.91	18.86	-	-	18.86		FA
2	Anika Nehls (GER)	16.79	17.22	x	16.59	17.22		FA
3	Maria Orozco Castro (MEX)	16.91	17.15	17.21	x	17.21		FA
4	Maja Ślepowrońska (POL)	15.82	16.12	16.40	x	16.40	PB	FA
5	Jeong Yu-sun (KOR)	16.11	x	15.72	x	16.11		FA
6	Grace Robinson (AUS)	15.16	14.50	15.61	15.05	15.61		FA
7	Michaela Walsh (IRL)	14.19	15.07	15.11	15.59	15.59	PB	FA
8	Lada Cermanová (CZE)	13.53	15.53	15.20	15.14	15.53		FA
9	Chelsea James (TTO)	14.71	15.15	x	14.56	15.15		FB
10	Yuliya Bayrak (UKR)	x	x	14.92	x	14.92		FB
11	Patrícia Slošárová (SVK)	14.88	13.30	14.09	x	14.88		FB
12	Elif Tas (TUR)	14.22	14.82	14.48	x	14.82		FB
13	Yekaterina Nesterova (KAZ)	14.27	13.70	14.68	14.17	14.68	PB	FB
14	Yolandi Stander (RSA)	14.33	14.62	11.57	13.67	14.62		FB
15	Valeria Radajeva (EST)	x	12.89	13.31	x	13.31		FB

=== Finals ===
==== Final A ====
Rank	Final Placing	Athlete	1	2	3	4	Result	Notes
1st place, gold medalist(s)	1	Alena Bugakova (RUS)	x	18.95	18.54	18.78	18.95	
2nd place, silver medalist(s)	2	Maria Orozco Castro (MEX)	16.73	17.55	x	x	17.55	
3rd place, bronze medalist(s)	3	Anika Nehls (GER)	16.47	17.11	16.94	17.31	17.31	
4	4	Maja Ślepowrońska (POL)	16.15	x	16.62	16.07	16.62	PB
5	5	Jeong Yu-sun (KOR)	16.03	x	15.32	x	16.03	
6	6	Michaela Walsh (IRL)	15.69	15.56	14.82	14.71	15.69	PB
7	7	Grace Robinson (AUS)	14.65	15.16	15.30	15.42	15.42	
8	8	Lada Cermanová (CZE)	x	13.23	14.87	x	14.87	

==== Final B ====
Rank	Final Placing	Athlete	1	2	3	4	Result	Notes
1	9	Yuliya Bayrak (UKR)	13.81	14.47	15.24	15.41	15.41	PB
2	10	Patrícia Slošárová (SVK)	14.80	14.94	14.49	15.11	15.11	
3	11	Yekaterina Nesterova (KAZ)	14.40	14.90	14.18	14.09	14.68	PB
4	12	Yolandi Stander (RSA)	14.17	14.45	14.32	14.18	14.45	
5	13	Elif Tas (TUR)	14.02	14.40	13.88	13.89	14.40	
6	14	Valeria Radajeva (EST)	13.68	x	13.58	13.63	13.68	
		Chelsea James (TTO)					DNS	
