= Czech Republic at the 2014 Summer Youth Olympics =

- IOC code: CZE
- NOC: Czech Olympic Committee
- Website: www.olympic.cz

in Nanjing
- Competitors: 37 in 14 sports
- Flag bearer: Tomáš Rousek
- Medals Ranked 40th: Gold 1 Silver 3 Bronze 3 Total 7

Summer Youth Olympics appearances (overview)
- 2010; 2014; 2018; 2026

The Czech Republic competed at the 2014 Summer Youth Olympics, in Nanjing, China, from 16 August to 28 August 2014.

== Medalists ==
Medals awarded to participants of mixed-NOC (combined) teams are represented in italics. These medals are not counted towards the individual NOC medal tally.

| Medal | Name | Sport | Event | Date |
|---|---|---|---|---|
| Gold | Barbora Průdková; Jan Rajchart; Roman Lehký; Nikola Nosková | Cycling | Mixed team relay | 24 August |
| Silver | Lukáš Helešic; Miroslav Jech | Rowing | Boys' pairs | 20 August |
| Silver | Nikola Nosková; Barbora Prudková | Cycling | Girls' Team | 22 August |
| Silver | Martina Satková | Canoeing | Girls' C1 slalom | 27 August |
| Bronze | Michaela Hrubá | Athletics | Girls' high jump | 24 August |
| Bronze | Kryštof Hájek | Canoeing | Boys' C1 sprint | 24 August |
| Bronze | Michaela Hrubá | Athletics | Mixed 8x100m relay | 26 August |
| Bronze | Amálie Hilgertová | Canoeing | Girls' K1 slalom | 27 August |

== Athletics ==
Czech Republic qualified six athletes.

Qualification Legend: Q=Final A (medal); qB=Final B (non-medal); qC=Final C (non-medal); qD=Final D (non-medal); qE=Final E (non-medal)

Girls
Track & road events

| Athlete | Event | Heats | | Final | |
| Athlete | Event | Result | Rank | Result | Rank |
|---|---|---|---|---|---|
| Veronika Paličková | 100 m | 12.26 | 14 qB | 12.41 | 13 |
| Tereza Vokálová | 400 m hurdles | 1:00.36 | 4 Q | 59.76 | 4 |

Field events

| Athlete | Event | Qualification | | Final | |
| Athlete | Event | Distance | Position | Distance | Position |
|---|---|---|---|---|---|
| Michaela Hrubá | High jump | 1.78 | 1 Q | 1.85 | 3rd place, bronze medalist(s) |
| Simona Pražáková | Pole vault | 3.70 | 6 Q | 3.70 | 8 |
| Lada Cermanová | Shot put | 15.53 | 8 Q | 14.87 | 8 |
| Lucie Staňková | Hammer throw | 59.31 | 13 qB | 55.56 | 6 |

== Basketball ==
Czech Republic qualified a girls' team based on the 1 June 2014 FIBA 3x3 National Federation Rankings.

Skills Competition

| Athlete | Event | Qualification | | | Final | | |
| Athlete | Event | Points | Time | Rank | Points | Time | Rank |
|---|---|---|---|---|---|---|---|
| Gabriela Andělová | Girls' Shoot-out Contest | 4 | 26.0 | 27 | did not advance | | |
| Sarah Beránková | Girls' Shoot-out Contest | 6 | 24.5 | 5 | did not advance | | |
| Aneta Zuzáková | Girls' Shoot-out Contest | 4 | 27.4 | 28 | did not advance | | |

=== Girls' tournament ===
Roster

- Gabriela Andělová
- Sarah Beránková
- Tereza Kracíková
- Aneta Zuzáková

Group stage

| Pos | Team | Pld | W | D | L | PF | PA | PD | Pts | Qualification |
|---|---|---|---|---|---|---|---|---|---|---|
| 1 | United States | 9 | 9 | 0 | 0 | 190 | 54 | +136 | 27 | Round of 16 |
| 2 | Belgium | 9 | 7 | 0 | 2 | 136 | 75 | +61 | 21 | Round of 16 |
| 3 | Thailand | 9 | 6 | 0 | 3 | 96 | 102 | −6 | 18 | Round of 16 |
| 4 | Czech Republic | 9 | 6 | 0 | 3 | 140 | 106 | +34 | 18 | Round of 16 |
| 5 | Chinese Taipei | 9 | 5 | 0 | 4 | 124 | 114 | +10 | 15 | Round of 16 |
| 6 | Romania | 9 | 5 | 0 | 4 | 118 | 102 | +16 | 15 | Round of 16 |
| 7 | Egypt | 9 | 4 | 0 | 5 | 125 | 127 | −2 | 12 | Round of 16 |
| 8 | Guam | 9 | 2 | 0 | 7 | 77 | 151 | −74 | 6 | Round of 16 |
| 9 | Andorra | 9 | 1 | 0 | 8 | 76 | 161 | −85 | 3 | Eliminated |
| 10 | Indonesia | 9 | 0 | 0 | 9 | 66 | 156 | −90 | 0 | Eliminated |

18 August 2014
19:40

| Czech Republic | 16–9 | Indonesia |

Wutaishan Sports Center, Nanjing

19 August 2014
17:40

| Egypt | 10–19 | Czech Republic |

Wutaishan Sports Center, Nanjing

19 August 2014
21:00

| Czech Republic | 12–15 | Thailand |

Wutaishan Sports Center, Nanjing

20 August 2014
19:40

| Belgium | 16–6 | Czech Republic |

Wutaishan Sports Center, Nanjing

22 August 2014
18:00

| Czech Republic | 21–7 | Andorra |

Wutaishan Sports Center, Nanjing

22 August 2014
21:40

| Chinese Taipei | vs. | Czech Republic |

Wutaishan Sports Center, Nanjing

23 August 2014
20:00

| Czech Republic | 21–7 | Guam |

Wutaishan Sports Center, Nanjing

24 August 2014
18:20

| Czech Republic | 12–21 | United States |

Wutaishan Sports Center, Nanjing

24 August 2014
20:40

| Romania | 9–19 | Czech Republic |

Wutaishan Sports Center, Nanjing

Knockout Stage

| Round of 16 | Quarterfinals | Semifinals | Final | Rank |
| Opposition Score | Opposition Score | Opposition Score | Opposition Score | Rank |
|---|---|---|---|---|
| China; L 12-15 | did not advance | | | |

== Beach volleyball ==
Czech Republic qualified a girls' team from their performance at the 2014 CEV Youth Continental Cup Final.

| Athletes | Event | Preliminary round | Standing | Round of 24 | Round of 16 | Quarterfinals | Semifinals | Final / BM | Rank |
| Athletes | Event | Opposition Score | Standing | Opposition Score | Opposition Score | Opposition Score | Opposition Score | Opposition Score | Rank |
|---|---|---|---|---|---|---|---|---|---|
| Kristýna Adamčíková; Kateřina Valková | Girls' | Vi/Van (VIE) | Q | Ocampo/Pacheco (ECU); W 2 - 0 | Bobadilla/Valiente (PAR); W 2 - 0 | Arnholdt/Schneider (GER); L 1 - 2 | did not advance | | 9 |
| Kristýna Adamčíková; Kateřina Valková | Girls' | Bitrus/Audu (SLE); W w/o | Q | Ocampo/Pacheco (ECU); W 2 - 0 | Bobadilla/Valiente (PAR); W 2 - 0 | Arnholdt/Schneider (GER); L 1 - 2 | did not advance | | 9 |
| Kristýna Adamčíková; Kateřina Valková | Girls' | Caputo/Muno (USA); W 2 - 1 | Q | Ocampo/Pacheco (ECU); W 2 - 0 | Bobadilla/Valiente (PAR); W 2 - 0 | Arnholdt/Schneider (GER); L 1 - 2 | did not advance | | 9 |
| Kristýna Adamčíková; Kateřina Valková | Girls' | Ramos/Lisboa (BRA) | Q | Ocampo/Pacheco (ECU); W 2 - 0 | Bobadilla/Valiente (PAR); W 2 - 0 | Arnholdt/Schneider (GER); L 1 - 2 | did not advance | | 9 |
| Kristýna Adamčíková; Kateřina Valková | Girls' | Gerson/Rohrer (SUI) | Q | Ocampo/Pacheco (ECU); W 2 - 0 | Bobadilla/Valiente (PAR); W 2 - 0 | Arnholdt/Schneider (GER); L 1 - 2 | did not advance | | 9 |

== Canoeing ==
Czech Republic qualified four boats based on its performance at the 2013 world junior canoe sprint and slalom championships.

Boys

| Athlete | Event | Qualification | | Repechage | | Round of 16 | | Quarterfinals | Semifinals | Final / BM | Rank |
| Athlete | Event | Time | Rank | Time | Rank | Time | Rank | Opposition Result | Opposition Result | Opposition Result | Rank |
|---|---|---|---|---|---|---|---|---|---|---|---|
| Kryštof Hájek | C1 slalom | 1:47.414 | 9 R | DSQ | | —N/a | | did not advance | | | |
| Kryštof Hájek | C1 sprint | 1:46.275 | 2 Q | —N/a | | 1:50.065 | 6 Q | Holdak (POL); W 1:45.480 | Tarnovschi (MDA); L 1:46.286 | Guliev (UZB); W 1:52.211 | 3rd place, bronze medalist(s) |
| Tomáš Rousek | K1 slalom | 1:14.878 | 7 Q | —N/a | | 1:12.571 | 6 Q | Huang (CHN); L 1:16.499 | did not advance | | |
| Tomáš Rousek | K1 sprint | 2:02.233 | 18 R | 2:03.217 | 10 | did not advance | | | | | |

Girls

| Athlete | Event | Qualification | | Repechage | | Round of 16 | | Quarterfinals | Semifinals | Final / BM | Rank |
| Athlete | Event | Time | Rank | Time | Rank | Time | Rank | Opposition Result | Opposition Result | Opposition Result | Rank |
|---|---|---|---|---|---|---|---|---|---|---|---|
| Martina Satková | C1 slalom | 1:26.608 | 2 Q | —N/a | | | | Kewat (IND); W 1:28.923 | Prioux (FRA); W 1:30.020 | Weratschnig (AUT); L 1:28.216 | 2nd place, silver medalist(s) |
| Martina Satková | C1 sprint | 2:58.984 | 8 R | 2:57.868 | 4 Q | —N/a | | Morales (MEX); L 2:54.888 | did not advance | | |
| Amálie Hilgertová | K1 slalom | 1:17.332 | 2 Q | —N/a | | 1:17.607 | 2 Q | Murray (GBR); W 1:20.530 | Prigent (FRA); L 1:20.431 | Jones (GER); W 1:18.223 | 3rd place, bronze medalist(s) |
| Amálie Hilgertová | K1 sprint | 2:09.155 | 13 R | 2:12.555 | 5 Q | 2:15.836 | 13 | did not advance | | | 13 |

== Cycling ==
Czech Republic qualified a boys' and girls' team based on its ranking issued by the UCI.

Team

| Athletes | Event | Cross-Country Eliminator | | Time trial | | | BMX | | Cross-Country race | | | Road race | | | Total Pts | Rank |
| Athletes | Event | Rank | Points | Time | Rank | Points | Rank | Points | Time | Rank | Points | Time | Rank | Points | Total Pts | Rank |
|---|---|---|---|---|---|---|---|---|---|---|---|---|---|---|---|---|
| Roman Lehký; Jan Rajchart | Boys' Team | 1 | 100 | 5:23.97 | 16 | 1 | 13 | 8 | 56:05 | 3 | 65 | 1:37:23; 1:37:23 | 4; 19 | 50 | 224 | 4 |
| Nikola Nosková; Barbora Prudková | Girls' Team | 1 | 100 | 6:52.83 | 25 | 0 | 18 | 0 | 43:21 | 1 | 100 | 1:12:36; 1:12:36 | 22; 6 | 30 | 230 | 2nd place, silver medalist(s) |

Mixed relay

| Athletes | Event | Cross-Country Girls' race | Cross-Country Boys' race | Boys' Road race | Girls' Road race | Total Time | Rank |
|---|---|---|---|---|---|---|---|
| Barbora Prudková; Jan Rajchart; Roman Lehký; Nikola Nosková | Mixed team relay | | | | | 17:31 | 1st place, gold medalist(s) |

== Gymnastics ==
=== Artistic gymnastics ===
Czech Republic qualified one athlete based on its performance at the 2014 European WAG Championships.

Girls

| Athlete | Event | Apparatus | | | | Total | Rank |
| Athlete | Event | F | V | UB | BB | Total | Rank |
|---|---|---|---|---|---|---|---|
| Veronika Cenková | Qualification | 11.800 26 | 13.200 26 | 10.300 26 | 13.100 7 Q | 48.400 | 18 Q |
| Veronika Cenková | all-around | 12.500 | 12.750 | 11.750 | 12.600 | 49.600 | 14 |
| Veronika Cenková | Balance Beam | —N/a | | | | 12.633 | 6 |

== Judo ==
Czech Republic qualified one athlete based on its performance at the 2013 Cadet World Judo Championships.

Individual

| Athlete | Event | Round of 32 | Round of 16 | Quarterfinals | Semifinals | Rep 1 | Rep 2 | Rep 3 | Rep 4 | Final / BM | Rank |
| Athlete | Event | Opposition Result | Opposition Result | Opposition Result | Opposition Result | Opposition Result | Opposition Result | Opposition Result | Opposition Result | Opposition Result | Rank |
|---|---|---|---|---|---|---|---|---|---|---|---|
| Adéla Szarzecová | Girls' -63 kg | —N/a | Schwille (GER); L 000-101 | did not advance | | —N/a | Sunjevic (MNE); L 011-101 | did not advance | | | 17 |

Team

| Athletes | Event | Round of 16 | Quarterfinals | Semifinals | Final | Rank |
| Athletes | Event | Opposition Result | Opposition Result | Opposition Result | Opposition Result | Rank |
|---|---|---|---|---|---|---|
| Team Berghmans; Anri Egutidze (POR); Edlene Mondelly (HAI); Michaela Polleres (AUT); Pamela Quizhpi (ECU); Domenik Schonefeldt (GER); Adéla Szarzecová (CZE); Wu Zhiqiang (CHN) | Mixed team | Team Kerr (MIX); W 4 – 3 | Team Xian (MIX); L 3 – 4 | did not advance | | 5 |

== Modern pentathlon ==
Czech Republic qualified two athletes based on its performance at the 2014 Youth A World Championships.

| Athlete | Event | Fencing Ranking round (épée one touch) | | Swimming (200 m freestyle) | | | Fencing Final Round (épée one touch) | | | Combined: shooting/running (10 m air pistol)/(3000 m) | | | Total Points | Final Rank |
| Athlete | Event | Results | Rank | Time | Rank | Points | Results | Rank | Points | Time | Rank | Points | Total Points | Final Rank |
|---|---|---|---|---|---|---|---|---|---|---|---|---|---|---|
| Martin Vlach | Boys' individual | | | 2:12.24 | 19 | 304 | | 18 | 220 | 11:52.10 | 1 | 588 | 1112 | 9 |
| Jolana Hojsáková | Girls' individual | | 20 | DNS | | | | | | | | | | 24 |
| Yana Polishchuk (UKR); Martin Vlach (CZE) | Mixed relay | | 6 | 2:03.35 | 13 | 330 | | 7 | 285 | 12:20.93 | 9 | 560 | 1175 | 5 |
| Jolana Hojsáková (CZE); Alexander Lifanov (RUS) | Mixed relay | | 1 | 2:01.70 | 6 | 335 | | 1 | 303 | 12:51.06 | 19 | 529 | 1167 | 6 |

== Rowing ==
Czech Republic qualified one boat based on its performance at the 2013 World Rowing Junior Championships. Later Czech Republic was given a reallocation quota.

| Athlete | Event | Heats | | Repechage | | Semifinals | | Final | |
| Athlete | Event | Time | Rank | Time | Rank | Time | Rank | Time | Rank |
|---|---|---|---|---|---|---|---|---|---|
| Lukáš Helešic; Miroslav Jech | Boys' pairs | 3:11.88 | 1 FA | —N/a | | | | 3:12.13 | 2nd place, silver medalist(s) |
| Anna Žabová | Girls' Single Sculls | 3:54.12 | 3 R | 3:52.93 | 1 SA/B | 3:56.11 | 4 FB | 4:03.69 | 10 |

Qualification Legend: FA=Final A (medal); FB=Final B (non-medal); FC=Final C (non-medal); FD=Final D (non-medal); SA/B=Semifinals A/B; SC/D=Semifinals C/D; R=Repechage

== Shooting ==
Czech Republic qualified one shooter based on its performance at the 2014 European Shooting Championships.

Individual

| Athlete | Event | Qualification | | Final | |
| Athlete | Event | Points | Rank | Points | Rank |
|---|---|---|---|---|---|
| Tereza Pribáňová | Girls' 10m air pistol | 366 | 13 | did not advance | |

Team

| Athletes | Event | Qualification | | Round of 16 | Quarterfinals | Semifinals | Final / BM | Rank |
| Athletes | Event | Points | Rank | Opposition Result | Opposition Result | Opposition Result | Opposition Result | Rank |
|---|---|---|---|---|---|---|---|---|
| Tereza Přibáňová (CZE); Sukhrab Turdyyev (KAZ) | Mixed team 10m air pistol | | | | | | | |

== Swimming ==
Czech Republic qualified four swimmers.

Boys

| Athlete | Event | Heat | | Semifinal | | Final | |
| Athlete | Event | Time | Rank | Time | Rank | Time | Rank |
|---|---|---|---|---|---|---|---|
| Petr Novák | 200 m freestyle | 1:54.74 | 26 | —N/a | | did not advance | |
| Petr Novák | 200 m butterfly | 2:05.90 | 17 | —N/a | | did not advance | |
| Vojtěch Simbartl | 50 m breaststroke | 29.98 | 27 | did not advance | | | |
| Vojtěch Simbartl | 100 m breaststroke | 1:05.38 | 31 | did not advance | | | |
| Vojtěch Simbartl | 200 m breaststroke | —N/a | | | | | |

Girls

| Athlete | Event | Heat | | Semifinal | | Final | |
| Athlete | Event | Time | Rank | Time | Rank | Time | Rank |
|---|---|---|---|---|---|---|---|
| Tereza Grusová | 50 m backstroke | 29.49 | 7 Q | 29.37 | 9 | did not advance | |
| Tereza Grusová | 100 m backstroke | 1:03.41 | 15 Q | 1:02.34 QSO 1:03.08 | 8 | did not advance | |
| Tereza Grusová | 200 m backstroke | 2:17.22 | 13 | —N/a | | did not advance | |
| Lucie Svěcená | 50 m butterfly | 27.09 | 3 Q | 27.18 | 9 | did not advance | |
| Lucie Svěcená | 100 m butterfly | 1:01.11 | 9 Q | 1:00.33 | 7 Q | 1:00.18 | 6 |

Mixed

| Athlete | Event | Heat | | Final | |
| Athlete | Event | Time | Rank | Time | Rank |
|---|---|---|---|---|---|
| Tereza Grusová; Petr Novák; Vojtěch Simbartl; Lucie Svěcená | 4×100 m medley relay | 4:00.27 | 8 Q | 3:59.63 | 7 |

== Table Tennis ==
Czech Republic qualified one athlete based on its performance at the 2014 World Qualification Event. Later another athlete qualified from reallocation of quotas.

Singles

| Athlete | Event | Group stage | Rank | Round of 16 | Quarterfinals | Semifinals | Final / BM | Rank |
| Athlete | Event | Opposition Score | Rank | Opposition Score | Opposition Score | Opposition Score | Opposition Score | Rank |
|---|---|---|---|---|---|---|---|---|
| David Reitšpies | Boys | Group F Zatowka (POL); L 2 - 3 | qB | | | | | |
| Kristýna Štefcova | Girls | Group A Seera (UGA); W 3 – 0 | qB | | Saad (EGY); W 3 – 1 | Wan (GER); L 1 - 3 | did not advance | 19 |
| Kristýna Štefcova | Girls | Doo (HKG) | qB | | Saad (EGY); W 3 – 1 | Wan (GER); L 1 - 3 | did not advance | 19 |
| Kristýna Štefcova | Girls | Arvelo (VEN) | qB | | Saad (EGY); W 3 – 1 | Wan (GER); L 1 - 3 | did not advance | 19 |

Team

| Athletes | Event | Group stage | Rank | Round of 16 | Quarterfinals | Semifinals | Final / BM | Rank |
| Athletes | Event | Opposition Score | Rank | Opposition Score | Opposition Score | Opposition Score | Opposition Score | Rank |
|---|---|---|---|---|---|---|---|---|
| Czech Republic; Kristýna Štefcová (CZE); David Reitšpies (CZE) | Mixed | Australia; Bui (AUS); Huang (AUS) | | | | | | |
| Czech Republic; Kristýna Štefcová (CZE); David Reitšpies (CZE) | Mixed | Europe 1 Diaconu (ROU); Chen (POR); L 1-2 | | | | | | |
| Czech Republic; Kristýna Štefcová (CZE); David Reitšpies (CZE) | Mixed | Singapore; Herng (SIN); Jing (SIN) | | | | | | |

Qualification Legend: Q=Main Bracket (medal); qB=Consolation Bracket (non-medal)

== Taekwondo ==
Czech Republic qualified one athlete based on its performance at the Taekwondo Qualification Tournament.

Girls

| Athlete | Event | Round of 16 | Quarterfinals | Semifinals | Final | Rank |
| Athlete | Event | Opposition Result | Opposition Result | Opposition Result | Opposition Result | Rank |
|---|---|---|---|---|---|---|
| Adriana Šimánková | −55 kg | Bye | Sarıdoğan (TUR); L 5 - 9 | did not advance | | 5 |

== Tennis ==
Czech Republic qualified two athletes based on the 9 June 2014 ITF World Junior Rankings.

Singles

| Athlete | Event | Round of 32 | Round of 16 | Quarterfinals | Semifinals | Final / BM | Rank |
| Athlete | Event | Opposition Score | Opposition Score | Opposition Score | Opposition Score | Opposition Score | Rank |
|---|---|---|---|---|---|---|---|
| Simona Heinová | Girls' singles | Jorović (SRB); W 2-0; 6-2, 7^{7}-6^{3} | Stollár (HUN); L 1-2; 4-6, 6-2, 0-6 | did not advance | | | 9 |
| Markéta Vondroušová | Girls' singles | Jacobs (NAM); W 2-1; 4-6, 6-1, 6-0 | Xu (CHN); L 1-2; 3-6, 6-3, 2-6 | did not advance | | | 9 |

Doubles

| Athletes | Event | Round of 32 | Round of 16 | Quarterfinals | Semifinals | Final / BM | Rank |
| Athletes | Event | Opposition Score | Opposition Score | Opposition Score | Opposition Score | Opposition Score | Rank |
|---|---|---|---|---|---|---|---|
| Simona Heinová (CZE); Markéta Vondroušová (CZE) | Girls' doubles | —N/a | Xu (CHN); Ye (CHN); W 2-1; 4-6, 6-4, [10]-[5] | Kalinina (UKR); Shymanovich (BLR); L 0-2; 5-7, 6^{6}-7^{8} | did not advance | | 5 |
| Simona Heinová (CZE); Rasheed Carey (BAH) | Mixed doubles | Herazo (COL); Valero (COL); W 2-0; 6-3, 6-2 | Kim (KOR); Lee (KOR); W w/o | Teichmann (SUI); Zieliński (POL); L 0-2; 3-6, 3-6 | did not advance | | 5 |
| Markéta Vondroušová (CZE); Nicolas Alvarez (PER) | Mixed doubles | Giangreco Campiz (PAR); Zormann (BRA); L 0-2; 5-7, 5-7 | did not advance | | | | 17 |
