= Nikola Obrovac =

Croatian swimmer (born 1998)

Personal information
- Nationality: Croatian
- Born: 18 June 1998 (age 28) Zagreb, Croatia
- Height: 185 cm (6 ft 1 in)
- Weight: 95 kg (209 lb)

Sport
- Sport: Swimming
- Strokes: Breaststroke
- Club: SC Medvescak Zagreb
Medal record
Men's swimming
Representing Croatia
Youth Olympic Games
Gold medal – first place	2014 Nanjing	50 m breaststroke
World Junior Championships
Bronze medal – third place	2015 Singapore	50 m breaststroke
European Games
Silver medal – second place	2015 Baku	50 m breaststroke
European Junior Championships
Gold medal – first place	2016 Hódmezővásárhely	50 m breaststroke

Nikola Obrovac (born 18 June 1998) is a Croatian swimmer. He competed in the men's 50 metre breaststroke event at the 2017 World Aquatics Championships.
