= Damian Wierling =

German swimmer

Personal information
- Full name: Damian Matthias Armin Wierling
- Nationality: German
- Born: 13 February 1996 (age 30) Essen, Germany
- Height: 1.98 m (6 ft 6 in)
- Weight: 93 kg (205 lb)

Sport
- Sport: Swimming
- Strokes: Freestyle
Medal record
Representing Germany
European Championships (LC)
Bronze medal – third place	2018 Glasgow	4×100 m medley
Youth Olympic Games
Silver medal – second place	2014 Nanjing	4×100 m medley
Bronze medal – third place	2014 Nanjing	100 m freestyle
Bronze medal – third place	2014 Nanjing	200 m freestyle
Bronze medal – third place	2014 Nanjing	4×100 m freestyle

Damian Matthias Armin Wierling (born 13 February 1996) is a German swimmer. He competed in the men's 50 metre freestyle, 100 metre freestyle, 4 × 100 metre freestyle relay and 4 × 100 metre medley relay events at the 2016 Summer Olympics. At the 2020 Olympic Games, he competed in the 100 metre freestyle, 4 x 100 metre freestyle relay, and 4 x 100 metre medley relay.
