= Alexander Lifanov =

Russian modern pentathlete

Personal information
- Full name: Alexander Petrovich Lifanov
- Nationality: Russian
- Born: 15 April 1996 (age 30) Megion, Russia

Sport
- Sport: Modern pentathlon
Medal record
Men's modern pentathlon
Representing RMPF
World Championships
Gold medal – first place	2021 Alexandria	Relay
Silver medal – second place	2021 Alexandria	Individual
Representing Russia
European Championships
Bronze medal – third place	2021 Nizhny Novgorod	Relay
Youth Olympic Games
Gold medal – first place	2014 Nanjing	Individual

Alexander Petrovich Lifanov (Russian: Александр Петрович Лифанов; born 15 April 1996) is a Russian modern pentathlete. He competed in the men's event at the 2020 Summer Olympics. He won the silver medal in the men's event and the gold medal in the men's relay event at the 2021 World Modern Pentathlon Championships held in Cairo, Egypt. He won the 2021 Cup of the President of the Russian Federation.
