= Grayson Bell =

Australian swimmer (born 1997)

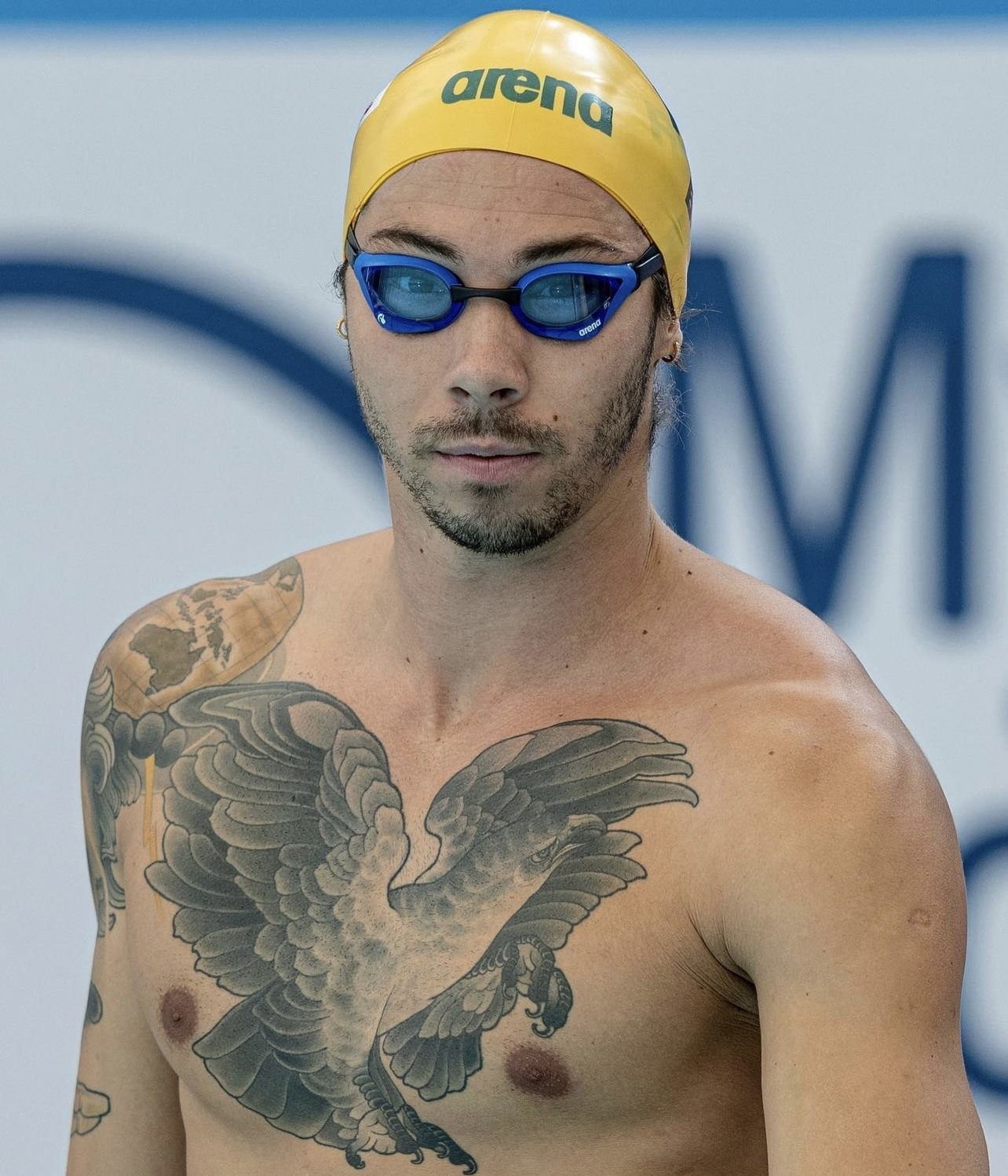
- Grayson Bell in Melbourne 2022

Personal information
- National team: Australia
- Born: 21 March 1997 (age 29) Southport, Queensland
- Height: 1.90 m (6 ft 3 in)
- Weight: 89 kg (196 lb)

Sport
- Sport: Swimming
- Strokes: Breaststroke, freestyle
- Club: Somerville
- Coach: Tim Lane
Medal record
Men's swimming
Representing Australia
World Championships (SC)
Gold medal – first place	2022 Melbourne	4×50 m freestyle
Bronze medal – third place	2022 Melbourne	4×50 m medley
World Junior Championships
Silver medal – second place	2015 Singapore	4×100 m mixed medley
Youth Olympic Games
Bronze medal – third place	2014 Nanjing	4×100 m medley
Bronze medal – third place	2014 Nanjing	4×100 m mixed medley
Oceania Championships
Gold medal – first place	2014 Auckland	4×100 m medley
Silver medal – second place	2014 Auckland	50 m breaststroke
Silver medal – second place	2014 Auckland	4×50 m mixed medley
Silver medal – second place	2014 Auckland	4×100 m mixed medley

Grayson Bell (born 21 March 1997) is an Australian swimmer. He competed in the men's 50 metre breaststroke event at the 2018 FINA World Swimming Championships (25 m), in Hangzhou, China.

== 2014 ==
=== 2014 Oceania Championships ===
2014 Oceania Championships
Gold medal – first place	4×100 m medley	3:43.91
Silver medal – second place	50 m breaststroke	29.57
Silver medal – second place	4×100 m mixed medley	3:55.68
Silver medal – second place	4×50 m mixed medley	1:48.57

Competing as a 17-year-old at his first senior international swimming championships, the 2014 Oceania Swimming Championships in Auckland, New Zealand in May, Bell won the silver medal in the 50-metre breaststroke with a time of 29.57 seconds. For his relay events, he won a gold medal as part of the 4×100 metre medley relay, splitting a 1:02.89 for the second leg of the relay in the final, he also won a silver medal in the breaststroke leg of the 4×100 metre mixed medley relay, splitting a time of 1:03.99, and a silver medal in the 4x50 mixed medley relay.

=== 2014 Summer Youth Olympics ===
2014 Summer Youth Olympics
Bronze medal – third place	4×100 m mixed medley	3:52.45
Bronze medal – third place	4×100 m medley	3:40.68

At the 2014 Summer Youth Olympics in August in Nanjing, China, Bell won two bronze medals, one in the 4×100 metre medley relay, and one in the 4×100 metre mixed medley relay, as well as placing ninth in the 50 metre breaststroke, eleventh in the 100 metre breaststroke, and twentieth in the 200 metre breaststroke.

== 2015 ==
=== 2015 World Junior Championships ===
2015 World Junior Championships
Silver medal – second place	4×100 m mixed medley	3:48.27

Bell competed at the 2015 World Junior Swimming Championships in Singapore in late August, Bell swam the heat of the 4x100 metre mixed medley relay which won silver in the final.

== 2016 ==
=== 2016 Swimming World Cup ===
==== Stop 7: Singapore ====
2016 World Cup — Singapore
Gold medal – first place	4×50 m mixed freestyle	1:31.04
Silver medal – second place	4×50 m mixed medley	1:40.97

At the 7th short course stop of the 2016 FINA Swimming World Cup, Bell was part of the relay that won the gold medal in the 4×50 m mixed freestyle and the silver medal in the 4×50 m mixed medley.

==== Stop 8: Tokyo ====
2016 World Cup — Tokyo
Gold medal – first place	4×50 m mixed freestyle	1:31.49
Bronze medal – third place	4×50 m mixed medley	1:41.29

Continuing to the 8th stop of the 2016 FINA Swimming World Cup, he won a gold medal as part of the 4×50 m mixed freestyle and the bronze medal in the 4×50 m mixed medley.

== 2018 ==
=== 2018 World Short Course Championships ===
Grayson competed in the men's 50 metre breaststroke event at the 2018 FINA World Swimming Championships (25 m), in Hangzhou, China. Bell placed. The 4x50 freestyle relay placed 4th in the final.

== 2022 ==
=== 2022 Australian Swimming Championships ===
Bell qualified for the 2022 Commonwealth Games in the 50 metre freestyle, based on his performance at the 2022 Australia Swimming Championships and entered to compete in the 50 metre breaststroke at the selection meet for the Commonwealth Games, the 2022 Australian Swimming Championships in May. Grayson was named to the team Australia rosters for both the 2022 World Aquatics Championships and 2022 Commonwealth Games based on his times and place-finishes.

=== 2022 World Aquatics Championships ===
At the 2022 World Aquatics Championships, held at Danube Arena in Budapest, Hungary starting in June, Bell placed 40th in the 50 metre freestyle preliminaries and 22nd in the 50 metre breaststroke.

=== 2022 Commonwealth Games ===
The following month, Bell ranked first in the preliminaries of the 50 metre breaststroke on the first day of swimming at the 2022 Commonwealth Games, advancing to the semifinals with a time of 27.63 seconds. He placed eight in both the 50 metre freestyle and 50 metre breaststroke final.

=== 2022 Australian Short Course Championships ===
Later the same month, Grayson won the silver medal in the 50 meter breaststroke at the 2022 Australian Short Course Swimming Championships with a time of 26.45, sharing the podium with two Americans. He placed third in the 50 metre freestyle in a time of 21.36 seconds, finishing 0.23 seconds behind of silver medalist Justin Ress and 0.30 seconds behind fellow Australian and gold medalist Kyle Chalmers.

=== 2022 World Short Course Championships ===
2022 World Championships (SC)
Gold medal – first place	4×50 m freestyle	1:23.44 (OC)
Bronze medal – third place	4×50 m medley	1:30.81 (OC)

In September, following his performances at the 2022 Australian Short Course Championships, Grayson was named to the Australia roster for the 2022 World Short Course Championships, which was held starting 13 December in Melbourne.

On day 3, Bell swam the preliminary heats of the 4×50 metre freestyle relay. The final team went on to win the gold medal helping set new Oceanian, Commonwealth, Australian, and Australian All Comers records with his fellow finals relay teammates in a time of 1:23.44

On the fifth day, he contributed a 25.92 for the breaststroke portion of the 4×50 metre medley relay in the final to help win the bronze medal with an Oceania, Commonwealth, and Australian record time of 1:30.81. In the semifinals of the 50 meter breaststroke, he broke the Oceania record in a time of 26.24 which placed him 10th.

== 2024 ==
=== 2024 Australian Short Course Championships ===
In September 2024, Bell broke the Australian and Oceania record in the heats of the 50 meter breaststroke in a time of 26.11. Later in the final, he broke his own record again in a time of 26.02.
