= Anna Matthes =

German modern pentathlete

Personal information
- Nationality: German
- Born: 5 March 1998 (age 28)

Sport
- Country: Germany
- Sport: Modern pentathlon
- Club: OSC Potsdam
Medal record
World Championships
Bronze medal – third place	2018 Mexico City	Team

Anna Matthes (born 5 March 1998) is a German modern pentathlete.

She participated at the 2018 World Modern Pentathlon Championships, winning a medal.
