= Christopher Reid (swimmer) =

South African swimmer (born 1996)

Chris Reid
Personal information
- Full name: Christopher Patrick Reid
- Nationality: South African
- Born: 10 January 1996 (age 30) Port Elizabeth, South Africa
- Height: 198 cm (6 ft 6 in)
- Weight: 98 kg (216 lb)

Sport
- Sport: Swimming

Christopher Patrick "Chris" Reid (born 10 January 1996) is a South African swimmer. He competed in the men's 100 metre backstroke event at the 2016 Summer Olympics where he finished 10th in the semifinals and did not advance to the finals. He attended and competed for the University of Alabama. In the Autumn of 2019, he was member of the inaugural International Swimming League swimming for the New York Breakers, who competed in the Americas Division.
