= Brent Szurdoki =

South African swimmer (born 1996)

Personal information
- Nationality: South African
- Born: 18 September 1996 (age 29)

Sport
- Sport: Swimming

Brent Szurdoki (born 18 September 1996 Roodepoort ) is a South African swimmer.

He competed in the men's 400 metre freestyle event at the 2017 World Aquatics Championships. In 2019, he represented South Africa at the 2019 African Games held in Rabat, Morocco.
