= Marek Ulrich =

German swimmer (born 1997)

Personal information
- Born: 12 January 1997 (age 29) Dessau, Germany
- Height: 1.99 m (6 ft 6 in)
- Weight: 97 kg (214 lb)

Sport
- Sport: Swimming
- Strokes: Backstroke
Medal record
Men's swimming
Representing Germany
European Games
Silver medal – second place	2015 Baku	50 m backstroke
Bronze medal – third place	2015 Baku	100 m backstroke
Bronze medal – third place	2015 Baku	Mixed 4 × 100 m medley relay
European Youth Olympic Festival
Gold medal – first place	2013 Utrecht	50 m freestyle
Silver medal – second place	2013 Utrecht	4x100 m freestyle
Bronze medal – third place	2013 Utrecht	4x100 m mixed freestyle

Marek Ulrich (born 12 January 1997) is a German swimmer. He competed in the men's 50 metre backstroke event at the 2017 World Aquatics Championships. In 2014, he represented Germany at the 2014 Summer Youth Olympics held in Nanjing, China.
