= Jarred Crous =

South African swimmer (born 1996)

Personal information
- Born: 27 June 1996 (age 30) Pretoria, South Africa
- Height: 187 cm (6 ft 2 in)
- Weight: 84 kg (185 lb)

Sport
- Sport: Swimming

Jarred Crous (born 27 June 1996) is a South African swimmer. He competed in the men's 200 metre breaststroke event at the 2016 Summer Olympics. He finished 25th in the heats with a time of 2:12.64 and did not qualify for the semifinals.
