= Maximilian Pilger =

German swimmer

Personal information
- Nationality: German
- Born: 25 February 1996 (age 30)

Sport
- Sport: Swimming

Maximilian Pilger (born 25 February 1996) is a German swimmer. He competed in the men's 200 metre breaststroke at the 2019 World Aquatics Championships.
