= 2015 German Indoor Athletics Championships =

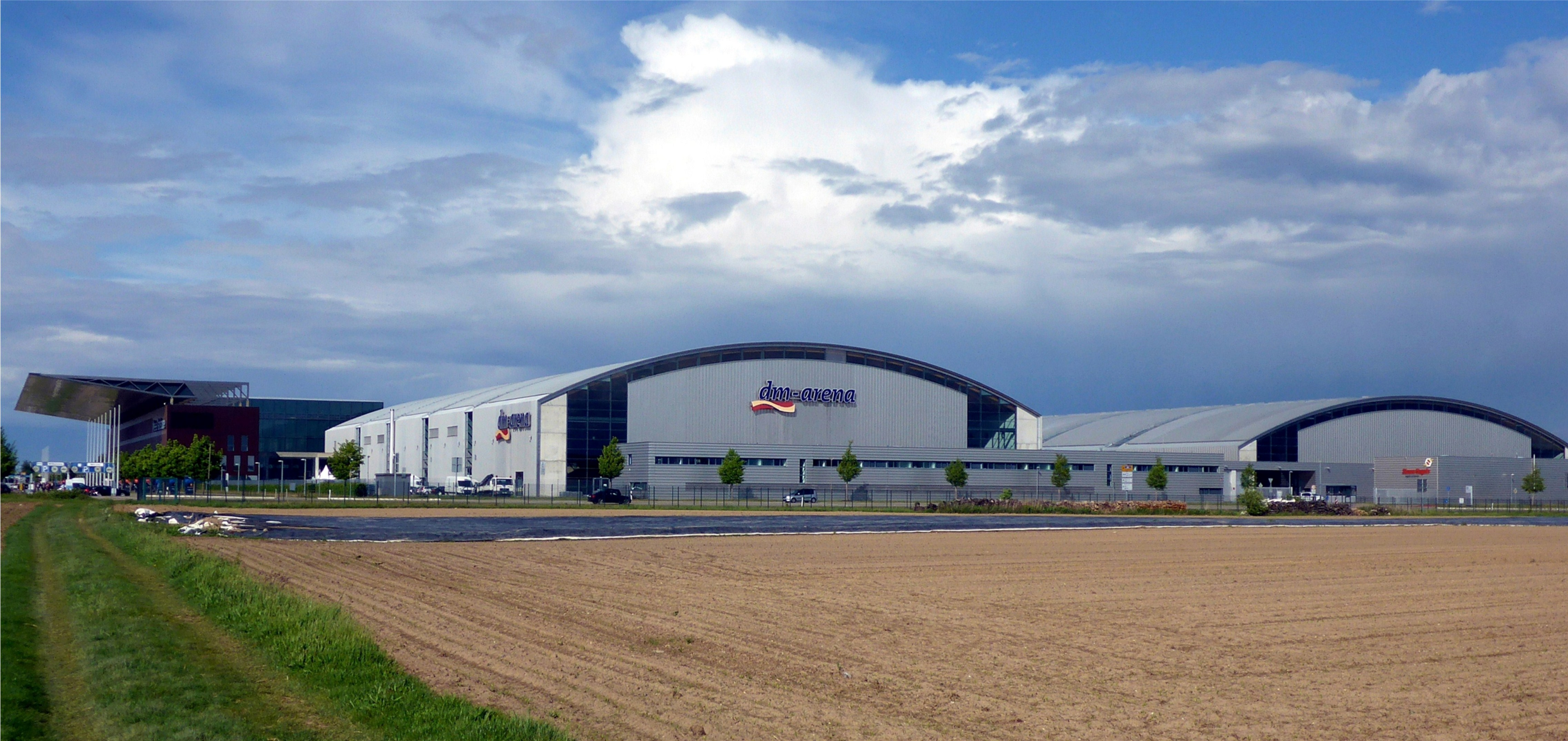
- The host stadium
- Edition: 62nd
- Dates: 21–22 February
- Host city: Karlsruhe
- Venue: Dm-Arena
- Events: 26+4

The 2015 German Indoor Athletics Championships (German: Deutsche Leichtathletik-Hallenmeisterschaften 2015) was the 62nd edition of the national championship in indoor track and field for Germany. It was held on 21–22 February at the Dm-Arena in Karlsruhe. It was the eighth time that Karlsruhe hosted event and a total of 8600 spectators attended. A total of 26 events, 12 for men and 13 for women, were contested plus four further events were held separately. It was to serve as preparation for the 2015 European Athletics Indoor Championships. The competition was originally scheduled to take place in the Europahalle, but the venue was changed for security reasons.

The combined events national championships were canceled in 2015. The racewalking competitions were held on 27 February in Erfurt, while the 3 × 800 m and 3 × 1000 m relays were held on 15 February alongside the German Indoor Youth Athletics Championships in Neubrandenburg.

== Results ==
=== Men ===
Event	Gold		Silver		Bronze	
60 metres	Christian Blum; TV Wattenscheid	6.57 s	Lucas Jakubczyk; SC Charlottenburg	6.58 s	Julian Reus; TV Wattenscheid	6.61 s
200 metres	Robin Erewa; TV Wattenscheid 01	20.70 s	Lucas Jakubczyk; SC Charlottenburg	20.76 s	Patrick Domogala; MTG Mannheim	20.94 s
400 metres	Alexander Gladitz; LG Hannover	46.88 s	Thomas Schneider; SC Magdeburg	46.96 s	Robert Hind; SV Saar 05 Saarbrücken	47.34 s
800 metres	Robin Schembera; TSV Bayer 04 Leverkusen	1:50.14 min	Sebastian Keiner; Erfurter LAC	1:50.18 min	Jan Riedel; Dresdner SC	1:50.55 min
1500 metres	Homiyu Tesfaye; LG Eintracht Frankfurt	3:41.68 min	Florian Orth; LG Telis Finanz Regensburg	3:47.82 min	Hundesa Abdi Uya; LG Lahn Aar-Esterau	3:46.48 min
3000 metres	Richard Ringer; VfB LC Friedrichshafen	8:29.57 min	Florian Orth; LG Telis Finanz Regensburg	8:29.61 min	Clemens Bleistein; LG Stadtwerke München	8:29.95 min
5000 m walk	Steffen Borsch; SV Halle	20:46.85 min	Björn Tharann; SV Halle	24:17.97 min	Only two finishers	
60 m hurdles	Erik Balnuweit; LAZ Leipzig	7.65 s	Alexander John; LAZ Leipzig	7.82 s	Martin Vogel; LAC Erdgas Chemnitz	7.86 s
4 × 200 m relay	TV Wattenscheid; Robin Erewa; Sebastian Ernst; Alexander Kosenkow; Maximilian Ruth	1:24.82 min	LT DSHS Köln; Robert Polkowski; Miguel Rigau; Fabian Schneider; Luca Willmann	1:25.97 min	LG Stadtwerke München; Benedikt Wiesend; David Gollnow; Christian Rasp; Tobias Giehl	1:27.30 min
3 × 1000 m relay	LG Braunschweig; Viktor Kuk; Andreas Lange; Sören Ludolph	7:09.95 min	TSV Bayer 04 Leverkusen; Dominic Neumann; Patrick Schoenball; Robin Schembera	7:10.54 min	LAV Bayer Uerdingen/Dormagen; Julian Spinrath; Fabian Spinrath; Carl-Philip Heising	7:25.85 min
High jump	Mateusz Przybylko; TSV Bayer 04 Leverkusen	2.26 m	Eike Onnen; LG Hannover	2.15 m	Martin Günther; LG Eintracht Frankfurt	2.15 m
Pole vault	Tobias Scherbarth; TSV Bayer 04 Leverkusen	5.70 m	Carlo Paech; TSV Bayer 04 Leverkusen	5.65 m	Marvin Caspari; TSV Bayer 04 Leverkusen	5.45 m
Long jump	Alyn Camara; TSV Bayer 04 Leverkusen	7.97 m	Julian Howard; LG Region Karlsruhe	7.95 m	Fabian Heinle; LAV Tübingen	7.75
Triple jump	Marcel Kornhardt; ASV Erfurt	16.21 m	Max Heß; LAC Erdgas Chemnitz	16.18 m	Andreas Pohle; ASV Erfurt	15.88 m
Shot put	David Storl; SC DHfK Leipzig	21.26 m	Tobias Dahm; VfL Sindelfingen	19.61 m	Christian Jagusch; SC Neubrandenburg	19.27 m

=== Women ===
Event	Gold		Silver		Bronze	
60 metres	Verena Sailer; MTG Mannheim	7.12 s	Alexandra Burghardt; MTG Mannheim	7.24 s	Rebekka Haase; LV 90 Erzgebirge	7.27 s
200 metres	Rebekka Haase; LV 90 Erzgebirge	23.12 s	Nadine Gonska; MTG Mannheim	23.30 s	Christina Haack; TV Wattenscheid	23.83 s
400 metres	Ruth Spelmeyer; VfL Oldenburg	52.99 s	Christiane Klopsch; LG OVAG Friedberg-Fauerbach	53.69 s	Daniela Ferenz; LG Neckar-Enz	53.93 s
800 metres	Christina Hering; LG Stadtwerke München	2:05.61 min	Kerstin Marxen; TSV Gomaringen	2:06.63 min	Mareen Kalis; LC Paderborn	2:07.11 min
1500 metres	Maren Kock; LG Telis Finanz Regensburg	4:13.72 min	Konstanze Klosterhalfen; TSV Bayer 04 Leverkusen	4:15.25 min	Thea Heim; LG Telis Finanz Regensburg	4:16.61 min
3000 metres	Gesa Felicitas Krause; LG Eintracht Frankfurt	9:04.84 min	Elina Sujew; LG Eintracht Frankfurt	9:07.74 min	Alina Reh; TSV Erbach	9:08.53 min
3000 m walk	Lea Dederichs; ART Düsseldorf	14:08.74 min	Nicole Best; TV Groß-Gerau	14:13.70 min	Franziska Glandorf; DJK Arminia Ibbenbüren	15:18.73 min
60 m hurdles	Cindy Roleder; LAZ Leipzig	7.99 s	Pamela Dutkiewicz; TV Wattenscheid	8.07 s	Sabrina Lindenmayer; VfL Sindelfingen	8.18 s
4 × 200 m relay	LT DSHS Köln; Friederike Möhlenkamp; Christine Salterberg; Leena Günther; Lena Naumann	1:37.07 min	TV Wattenscheid; Christina Haack; Pamela Dutkiewicz; Monika Zapalska; Maike Dix	1:37.59 min	LC Paderborn; Inna Weit; Ina Thimm; Jutta Menne; Janina Kölsch	1:37.83 min
3 × 800 m relay	TSV Bayer 04 Leverkusen; Laura Vierbaum; Lena Menzel; Lena Klaassen	6:27.00 min	LAV Bayer Uerdingen/Dormagen; Susan Robb; Anja Roggel; Tanja Spill	6:38.97 min	LG Olympia Dortmund; Vanessa Guting; Linda Wrede; Laura Hansen	6:49.70 min
High jump	Imke Onnen; LG Hannover	1.86 m	Alexandra Plaza; LT DSHS Köln	1.83 m	Katarina Mögenburg; TSV Bayer 04 Leverkusen Carolin Schäfer; TV Friedrichstein Melanie Skotnik; TSG Weinheim	1.80 m
Pole vault	Lisa Ryzih; ABC Ludwigshafen	4.55 m	Katharina Bauer; TSV Bayer 04 Leverkusen	4.50 m	Martina Strutz; Schweriner SC	4.45 m
Long jump	Sosthene Moguenara; TV Wattenscheid	6.68 m	Ksenia Achkinadze; Wiesbadener LC	6.55 m	Lisa Kurschilgen; TV Wattenscheid	6.48 m
Triple jump	Kristin Gierisch; LAC Erdgas Chemnitz	14.11 m	Katja Demut; LC Jena	14.10 m	Elina Sterzing; LAV Tübingen	13.20 m
Shot put	Lena Urbaniak; LG Filstal	17.79 m	Denise Hinrichs; TV Wattenscheid	17.76 m	Josephine Terlecki; SC DHfK Leipzig	17.20 m
