= 2012 German Indoor Athletics Championships =

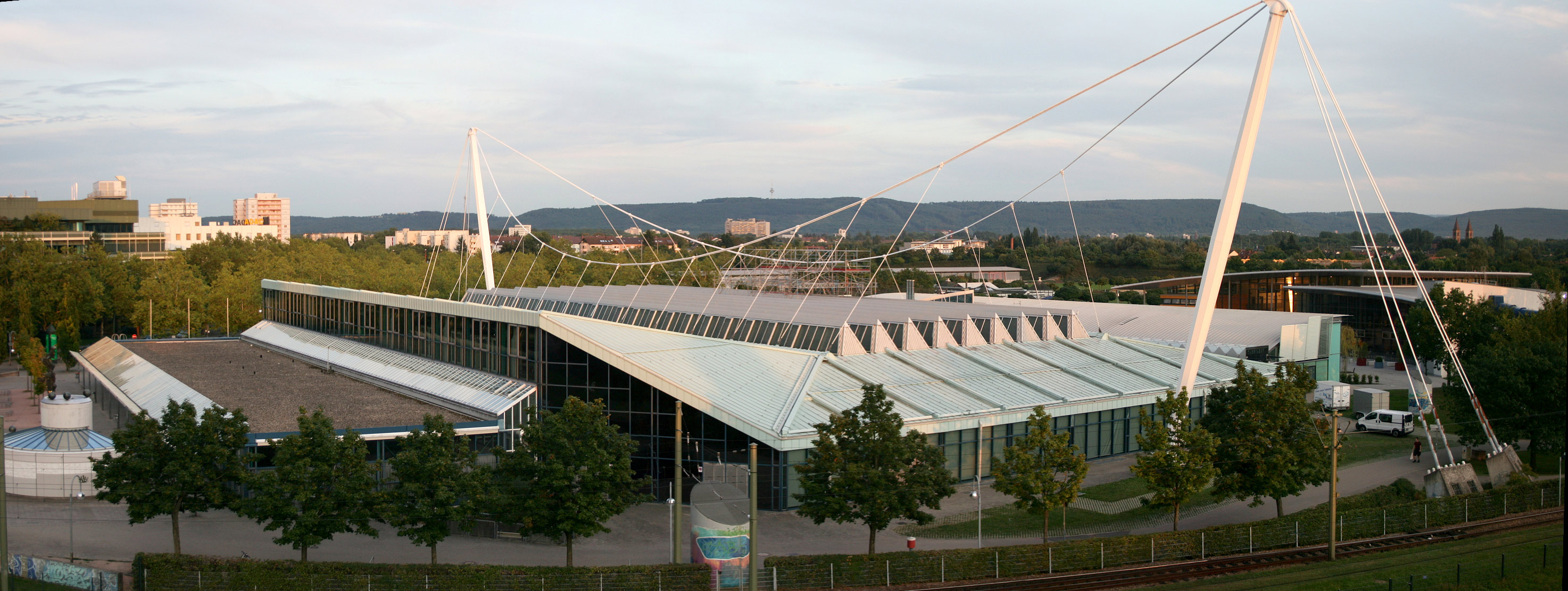
- The host stadium
- Edition: 59th
- Dates: 25–26 February
- Host city: Karlsruhe
- Venue: Europahalle Karlsruhe
- Events: 28+3

The 2012 German Indoor Athletics Championships (German: Deutsche Leichtathletik-Hallenmeisterschaften 2012) was the 59th edition of the national championship in indoor track and field for Germany. It was held on 25–26 February at the Europahalle Karlsruhe in Karlsruhe. A total of 28 events, 14 for men and 14 for women, were contested plus three further events were held separately. It was to serve as preparation for the 2012 IAAF World Indoor Championships.

The combined events national championships were held on 28–29 January at the Helmut-Körnig-Halle in Dortmund. The 3 × 1000 m relays were held on 19 February alongside the German Indoor Youth Athletics Championships in Sindelfingen.

For the first time, the 4 × 400 metres relay was no longer in the program. The men's 4 × 200 metres relay relay team from TV Wattenscheid 01 Athletics ran a German record. Championship records were set by Björn Otto in the pole vault and Carolin Walter over 800 metres. European-leading performances were set by Cathleen Tschirch in the 200 metres and David Storl in the shot put.

== Results ==
=== Men ===
Event	Gold		Silver		Bronze	
60 metres	Christian Blum; TV Wattenscheid	6.62 s	Tobias Unger; VfB Stuttgart	6.69 s	Maximilian Kessler; SC Charlottenburg	6.70 s
200 metres	Aleixo-Platini Menga; TSV Bayer 04 Leverkusen	20.94 s	Sven Knipphals; VfL Wolfsburg	21.03 s	Maximilian Kessler; SC Charlottenburg	21.09 s
400 metres	Miguel Rigau; LT DSHS Köln	46.90 s	Simon Kirch; SV Saar 05 Saarbrücken	46.96 s	Thomas Schneider; Dresdner SC	47.01 s
800 metres	Sören Ludolph; LG Braunschweig	1:52.27 min	Jan Riedel; Dresdner SC	1:52.53 min	Kevin Stadler; Erfurter LAC	1:52.54 min
1500 metres	Homiyu Tesfaye; LG Eintracht Frankfurt	3:47.34 min	Carsten Schlangen; LG Nord Berlin	3:48.05 min	Martin Sperlich; VfB LC Friedrichshafen	3:49.84 min
3000 metres	Arne Gabius; LAV Tübingen	7:51.72 min	Steffen Uliczka; SG TSV Kronshagen/Kieler TB	8:04.98 min	Simon Stützel; TV Wattenscheid	8:06.34 min
60 m hurdles	Gregor Traber; LAV Tübingen	7.59 s	Alexander John; LAZ Leipzig	7.69 s	Matthias Bühler; LG Offenburg	7.70 s
4 × 200 m relay	TV Wattenscheid; Julian Reus; Robin Erewa; Alexander Kosenkow; Christian Blum	1:23.90 min	SC Charlottenburg; Maximilian Kessler; Eric Franke; Robert Hind; George Petzold	1:24.84 min	LG Stadtwerke München; Christian Rasp; Marcus Mikulla; Benedikt Wiesend; David Gollnow	1:25.52 min
3 × 1000 m relay	TV Wattenscheid; Martin Bischoff; Simon Stützel; Christoph Lohse	7:16.01 min	StG Balingen/Zell; Clemens Silabetzschky; Randy Bögelspacher; Denis Bäuerle	7:22.69 min	StG Magdeburg-Halle; Tim Jurich; Stephan Abisch; Oliver Vogel	7:23.02 min
5000 m walk	Nils Christopher Gloger; SC Potsdam	20:19.07 min	Mike Berger; SC Charlottenburg	20:33.90 min	Steffen Borsch; SV Halle	21:43.14 min
High jump	Raúl Spank; Dresdner SC	2.32 m	Matthias Haverney; Dresdner SC	2.26 m	Sebastian Kneifel; TSV Bayer 04 Leverkusen	2.15 m
Pole vault	Björn Otto; LAV Bayer Uerdingen/Dormagen	5.92 m	Malte Mohr; TV Wattenscheid	5.87 m	Raphael Holzdeppe; LAZ Zweibrücken	5.82 m
Long jump	Sebastian Bayer; Hamburger SV	8.12 m	Julian Howard; LG Region Karlsruhe	7.88 m	Alyn Camara; TSV Bayer 04 Leverkusen	7.78 m
Triple jump	Andreas Pohle; ASV Erfurt	16.51 m	Martin Seiler; ABC Ludwigshafen	16.16 m	Manuel Ziegler; LG Telis Finanz Regensburg	15.80 m
Shot put	David Storl; LAC Erdgas Chemnitz	21.40 m	Candy Bauer; LV 90 Erzgebirge	19.77 m	Artur Hoppe; VfL Sindelfingen	19.56 m
Heptathlon	Steffen Kahlert; TuS Wunstorf	5813 pts	Rico Freimuth; Hallesche LF	5715 pts	Matthias Prey; Ahrensburger TSV	5702 pts

=== Women ===
Event	Gold		Silver		Bronze	
60 metres	Verena Sailer; MTG Mannheim	7.15 s	Yasmin Kwadwo; TV Wattenscheid	7.28 s	Tatjana Pinto; LG Ratio Münster	7.34 s
200 metres	Cathleen Tschirch; TSV Bayer 04 Leverkusen	23.21 s	Anne Möllinger; MTG Mannheim	23.39 s	Rebekka Haase; LV 90 Erzgebirge	24.26 s
400 metres	Esther Cremer; TV Wattenscheid	52.45 s	Wiebke Ullmann; TSV Bayer 04 Leverkusen	53.48 s	Maral Feizbakhsh; TV Wattenscheid	53.86 s
800 metres	Carolin Walter; TSV Bayer 04 Leverkusen	2:01.29 min	Karoline Pilawa; LG Stadtwerke München	2:04.69 min	Aline Krebs; LAZ Saarbrücken	2:04.71 min
1500 metres	Maren Kock; LG Telis Finanz Regensburg	4:14.72 min	Corinna Harrer; LG Telis Finanz Regensburg	4:15.24 min	Gesa Felicitas Krause; LG Eintracht Frankfurt	4:16.36 min
3000 metres	Corinna Harrer; LG Telis Finanz Regensburg	9:25.87 min	Maren Kock; LG Telis Finanz Regensburg	9:26.11 min	Jana Sussmann; LT Haspa Marathon	9:28.52 min
60 m hurdles	Cindy Roleder; LAZ Leipzig	7.96 s	Carolin Nytra; MTG Mannheim	7.98 s	Nadine Hildebrand; LAZ Salamander Kornwestheim-Ludwigsburg	8.14 s
4 × 200 m relay	TV Wattenscheid; Christina Haack; Esther Cremer; Yasmin Kwadwo; Maike Dix	1:33.86 min	TSV Bayer 04 Leverkusen; Cathleen Tschirch; Julia Förster; Anna Maiwald; Wiebke Ullmann	1:34.72 min	LG Ratio Münster; Tatjana Pinto; Lena Malkus; Theresa Greb; Kathrin Czichon	1:36.55 min
3000 m walk	Sabine Krantz; TV Wattenscheid 01	12:18.70	Melanie Seeger; SC Potsdam	12:44.29	Only two participants	
High jump	Ariane Friedrich; LG Eintracht Frankfurt	1.91 m	Marie-Laurence Jungfleisch; LAZ Salamander Kornwestheim-Ludwigsburg	1.89 m	Nadja Kampschulte; TV Wattenscheid	1.89 m
Pole vault	Silke Spiegelburg; TSV Bayer 04 Leverkusen	4.57 m	Kristina Gadschiew; LAZ Zweibrücken	4.52 m	Lisa Ryzih; ABC Ludwigshafen	4.47 m
Long jump	Ksenia Achkinadze; SC Gelnhausen	6.56 m	Lena Malkus; LG Ratio Münster	6.44 m	Kristin Gierisch; LAC Erdgas Chemnitz	6.41 m
Triple jump	Kristin Gierisch; LAC Erdgas Chemnitz	14.19 m	Jenny Elbe; Dresdner SC	14.02 m	Theresa Greb; LG Ratio Münster	13.07 m
Shot put	Nadine Kleinert; SC Magdeburg	19.13 m	Christina Schwanitz; LV 90 Erzgebirge	18.68 m	Denise Hinrichs; TV Wattenscheid	18.06 m
Pentathlon	Maren Schwerdtner; Hannover 96 4318	4318 pts	Christina Kiffe; ASC Darmstadt	4284 pts	Stefanie Saumweber; SSV Ulm 1846	4064 pts
