= 2013 German Indoor Athletics Championships =

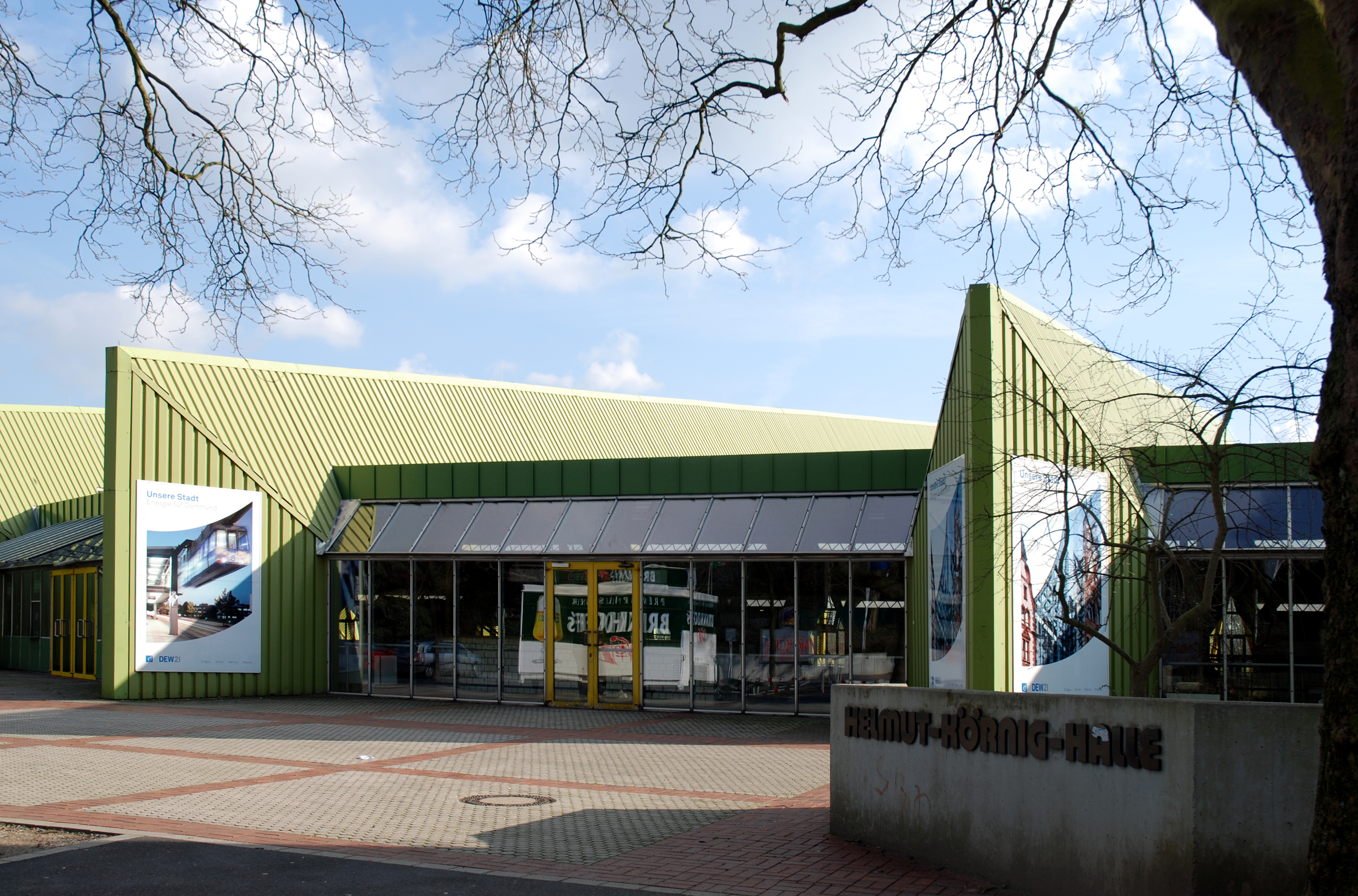
- The host stadium
- Edition: 60th
- Dates: 23–24 February
- Host city: Dortmund
- Venue: Helmut-Körnig-Halle
- Events: 26+5

The 2013 German Indoor Athletics Championships (German: Deutsche Leichtathletik-Hallenmeisterschaften 2013) was the 60th edition of the national championship in indoor track and field for Germany. It was held on 23–24 February at the Helmut-Körnig-Halle in Dortmund. A total of 26 events, 13 for men and 13 for women, were contested plus five further events were held separately. It was to serve as preparation for the 2013 European Athletics Indoor Championships. The event was sold out on both days.

The combined events and racewalking national championships were held on 26–27 January at the Leichtathletikhalle Frankfurt-Kalbach in Kalbach-Riedberg. The 3 × 800 m and 3 × 1000 m relays were held on 17 February alongside the German Indoor Youth Athletics Championships in Halle (Saale).

Christina Schwanitz won the women's shot put with the best performance by any athlete that year.

== Results ==
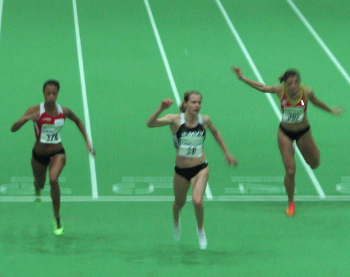
Verena Sailer winning the women's 60 metres final

=== Men ===
Event	Gold		Silver		Bronze	
60 metres	Julian Reus; TV Wattenscheid	6.56 s	Lucas Jakubczyk; SC Charlottenburg	6.70 s	Martin Keller; LAZ Leipzig	6.74 s
200 metres	Maximilian Kessler; SCC Berlin	21.12 s	Patrick Domogala; MTG Mannheim	21.44 s	Roy Schmidt; LAZ Leipzig	21.53 s
400 metres	Thomas Schneider; SC Magdeburg	47.33 s	David Gollnow; LG Stadtwerke München	47.43 s	Miguel Rigau; LT DSHS Köln	47.55 s
800 metres	Robin Schembera; TSV Bayer 04 Leverkusen	1:49.11 min	Andreas Lange; LG Reinbek-Ohe	1:49.19 min	Jan Riedel; Dresdner SC	1:49.70 min
1500 metres	Florian Orth; LG Telis Finanz Regensburg	3:41.00 min	Heyi Tesfave; LG Eintracht Frankfurt	3:41.05 min	Sebastian Keiner; Erfurter LAC	3:43.25 min
3000 metres	Carsten Schlangen; LG Nord Berlin	7:55.37 min	Clemens Bleistein; LG Stadtwerke München	8:01.55 min	Nico Sonnenberg; LG Eintracht Frankfurt	8:01.96 min
60 m hurdles	Erik Balnuweit; LAZ Leipzig	7.61 s	Gregor Traber; LAV Tübingen	7.66 s	Helge Schwarzer; Hamburger SV	7.78 s
4 × 200 m relay	LG Stadtwerke München; Kamghe Gaba; Jonas Plass; Benedikt Wiesend; David Gollnow	1:25.76 min	SC Charlottenburg; Robert Hind; Eric Franke; Maximilian Kessler; George Petzold	1:26.06 min	TV Gladbeck; Sebastian Fricke; Matthias Bos; Simon Schlebach; Kevin Sellke	1:26.38 min
3 × 1000 m relay	VfB LC Friedrichshafen; Maximilian Dersch; Martin Sperlich; Richard Ringer	7:11.06 min	Laufteam Erfurt; Sven Paetorius; Kevin Stadler; Sebastian Keiner	7:11.17 min	LG Nord Berlin; Micha Heidenreich; Sebastian Dennis; Carsten Schlangen	7:11.36 min
High jump	Matthias Haverney; Dresdner SC	2.15 m	Mateusz Przybylko; TSV Bayer 04 Leverkusen	2.15 m	Matthias Franta; TSV Schott Mainz Benjamin Lauckner; LAC Erdgas Chemnitz	2.10 m
Pole vault	Björn Otto; ASV Köln	5.85 m	Malte Mohr; TV Wattenscheid	5.80 m	Hendrik Gruber; TSV Bayer 04 Leverkusen	5.75 m
Long jump	Christian Reif; LC Rehlingen	8.06 m	Sebastian Bayer; Hamburger SV	7.97 m	Mario Kral; Hamburger SV	7.82 m
Triple jump	Matthias Uhrig; VfL Sindelfingen	16.15 m	Andreas Pohle; ASV Erfurt	15.75 m	Marcel Kornhardt; ASV Erfurt	15.48 m
Shot put	Ralf Bartels; SC Neubrandenburg	20.08 m	Marco Schmidt; VfL Sindelfingen	19.7 m	Hendrik Müller; LAC Erdgas Chemnitz	19.23 m
5000 m walk	Nils Brembach; SC Potsdam	19:39.88 min	Nils Gloger; SC Potsdam	19:47.52 min	Carsten Schmidt; SC Charlottenburg	20:38.73 min
Heptathlon	Matthias Prey; SC Rönnau 74	5815 pts	Patrick Scherfose; LG Weserbergland	5775 pts	Felix Hepperle; LG Neckar-Enz	5700 pts

=== Women ===
Event	Gold		Silver		Bronze	
60 metres	Verena Sailer; MTG Mannheim	7.18 s	Tatjana Pinto; LG Ratio Münster	7.24 s	Inna Weit; LC Paderborn	7.38 s
200 metres	Inna Weit; LC Paderborn	23.53 s	Maike Dix; TV Wattenscheid	23.61 s	Katharina Grompe; LG Olympia Dortmund	23.72 s
400 metres	Julia Förster; TSV Bayer 04 Leverkusen	54.22 s	Christiane Klopsch; LG Friedberg-Fauerbach	54.62 s	Wiebke Ullmann; TSV Bayer 04 Leverkusen	55.03 s
800 metres	Sonja Mosler; TV Herkenrath	2:05.54 min	Christine Gess; TSG Balingen	2:05.97 min	Jana Hartmann; LG Olympia Dortmund	2:06.43 min
1500 metres	Annett Horna; LC Rehlingen	4:13.26 min	Elina Sujew; LT Haspa Marathon	4:13.57 min	Diana Sujew; LT Haspa Marathon	4:14.74 min
3000 metres	Corinna Harrer; LG Telis Finanz Regensburg	9:04.21 min	Maren Kock; LG Telis Finanz Regensburg	9:19.93 min	Carolin Aehling; LG Telis Finanz Regensburg	9:22.93 min
60 m hurdles	Nadine Hildebrand; VfL Sindelfingen	8.07 s	Cindy Roleder; LAZ Leipzig	7.95 s	Alexandra Burghardt; LG Stadtwerke München	8.25 s
4 × 200 m relay	TV Wattenscheid; Maike Dix; Esther Cremer; Maral Feizbakhsh; Pamela Dutkiewicz	1:35.42 min	TSV Bayer 04 Leverkusen; Kira Biesenbach; Julia Förster; Wiebke Ullmann; Mareike Peters	1:35.87 min	LT DSHS Köln; Laura Zurl; Leena Günther; Kim Carina Schmidt; Lara Hoffmann	1:36.02 min
High jump	Marie-Laurence Jungfleisch; LAV Stadtwerke Tübingen	1.87 m	Nadja Kampschulte; TV Wattenscheid	1.84 m	Nele Hollmann; TV Wattenscheid Imke Onnen; LG Hannover Julia Straub; TSV Bayer 04 Leverkusen Linda Zuber; TSV Bayer 04 Leverkusen	1.80 m
Pole vault	Kristina Gadschiew; LAZ Zweibrücken	4.40 m	Annika Roloff; MTV Holzminden	4.35 m	Joana Kraft; TuS Metzingen	4.25 m
Long jump	Lisa Steinkamp; VfL Sindelfingen	6.38 m	Urszula Westhof; SC Charlottenburg	6.37 m	Stefanie Voss; LAV Bayer Uerdingen/Dormagen	6.33 m
Triple jump	Jenny Elbe; Dresdner SC	13.86 m	Kristin Gierisch; LAC Erdgas Chemnitz	13.71 m	Elina Sterzing; TSV Rottweil	12.91 m
Shot put	Christina Schwanitz; LV 90 Erzgebirge	19.79 m	Josephine Terlecki; SC Magdeburg	17.69 m	Shanice Craft; MTG Mannheim	17.66 m
3000 m walk	Nicole Best; TV Groß-Gerau	14:01.81 min	Bianca Schenker; LG Vogtland	14:08.40 min	Brit Schröter; LG Vogtland	14:08.97 min
Pentathlon	Julia Mächtig; SC Neubrandenburg	4397 pts	Alina Biesenbach; TSV Bayer 04 Leverkusen	4067 pts	Anna Maiwald; TSV Bayer 04 Leverkusen	3943 pts
