= Yemisi Mabry =

German shot putter (born 1998)

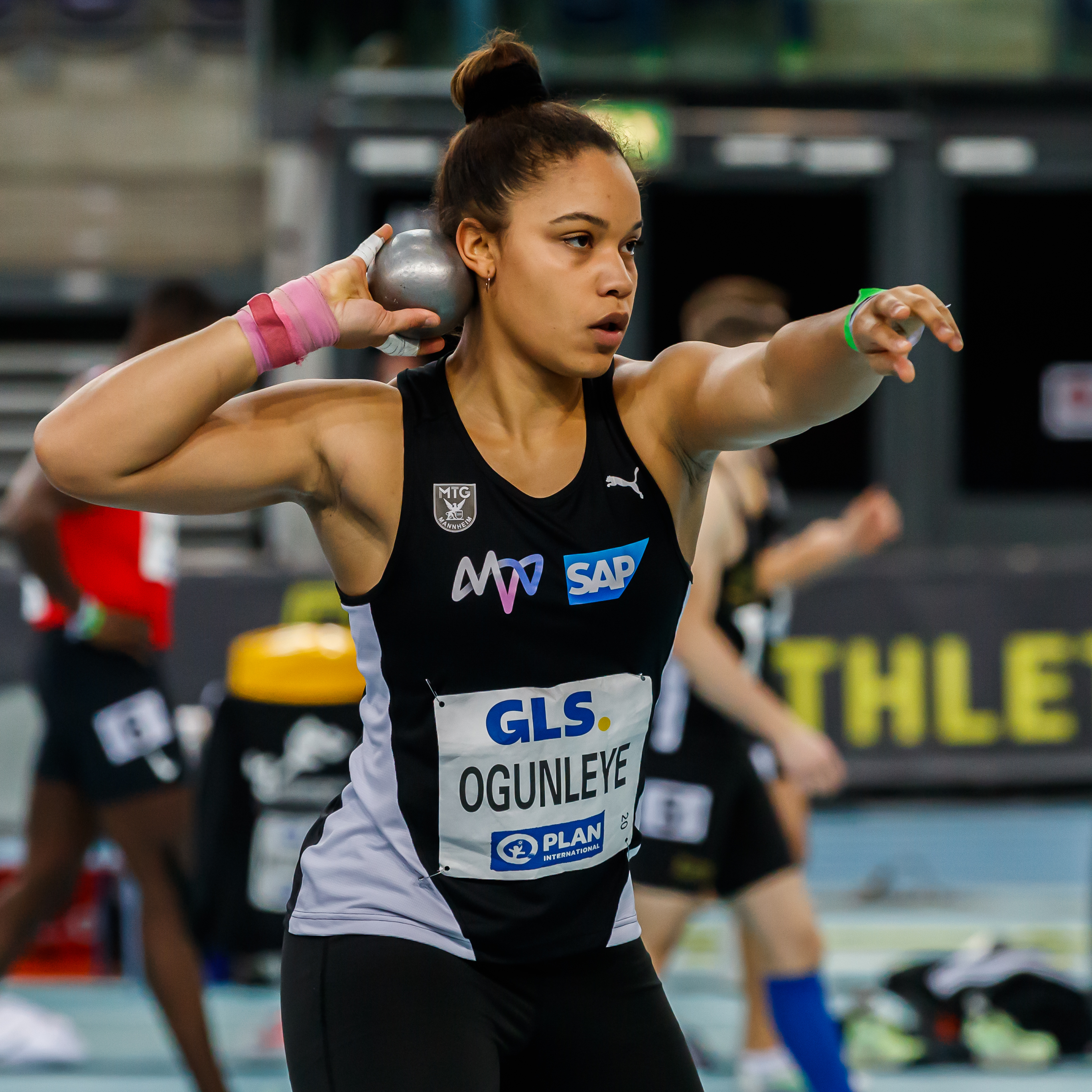
- Competing in 2022

Personal information
- Nationality: Germany
- Born: Yemisi Ogunleye; 3 October 1998 (age 28)
- Height: 183 cm (6 ft 0 in)
- Weight: 67 kg (148 lb)

Sport
- Sport: Athletics
- Event: Shot put
- Club: MTG Mannheim

Achievements and titles
- National finals: 2014 German U18s; • Shot put, 5th; 2015 German U18s; • Shot put, 1st (gold); 2017 German Indoor U20s; • Shot put, 3rd (bronze); 2017 German U23s; • Shot put, 6th; • Discus throw, 6th; 2017 German Champs; • Shot put, 7th; 2018 German Indoors; • Shot put, 8th; 2018 German U23s; • Discus throw, 7th; • Shot put, 5th; 2018 German Champs; • Shot put, 8th; 2019 German Indoors; • Shot put, 8th; 2019 German U23s; • Shot put, 5th; 2019 German Champs; • Shot put, NM; 2020 Luxembourgian Indoors; • Shot put, 1st (gold); 2020 German Indoors; • Shot put, 7th; 2020 German Champs; • Shot put, 3rd (bronze); 2021 German Champs; • Shot put, 3rd (bronze); 2022 German Indoors; • Shot put, 5th; 2022 German Champs; • Shot put, 4th; 2023 German Indoors; • Shot put, 4th; 2023 German Champs; • Shot put, 2nd (silver); 2024 German Indoors; • Shot put, 1st (gold)
- Personal best: SP: 20.19m (2024)
Medal record
Women's athletics
Representing Germany
Olympic Games
Gold medal – first place	2024 Paris	Shot put
World Indoor Championships
Silver medal – second place	2024 Glasgow	Shot put
European Championships
Bronze medal – third place	2024 Rome	Shot put
Bronze medal – third place	2026 Birmingham	Shot put
European Indoor Championships
Silver medal – second place	2025 Apeldoorn	Shot put
European Throwing Cup
Silver medal – second place	2023 Leiria	Shot put
- Updated on 13 June 2024

Yemisi Mabry (née Ogunleye; born 3 October 1998) is a German shot putter. She won the gold medal in the shot put at the 2024 Paris Olympics with 20.00 metres in the final round. She also won the silver medal at the 2024 World Indoor Championships and the 2025 European Indoor Championships, and the bronze medal at the 2024 European Championships.

== Early life ==
Yemisi Ogunleye was born in Germersheim, Germany and grew up in the village of Bellheim. She has a German mother and a Yoruba Nigerian father.

== Career ==
As Yemisi Ogunleye she trained with the club MTG Mannheim in Mannheim, Germany. She finished 10th at the 2023 World Athletics Championships. At the 2024 World Athletics Indoor Championships, Ogunleye led the field after the first throw, and despite only throwing one more valid attempt she won the silver medal. In June, she won the bronze medal at the 2024 European Athletics Championships in Rome with a best mark of 18.62 metres. In August, she won the gold medal at the 2024 Olympic Games in Paris, taking the lead with her final throw of the competition, a personal best 20.00 metres which put ahead of New Zealand's Maddison-Lee Wesche, who herself had thrown a personal best of 19.86 m.

Having set a new personal best at the 2025 German Indoor Championships, in March 2025, she won the silver medal at the 2025 European Athletics Indoor Championships in Apeldoorn, Netherlands, behind Jessica Schilder. In June, she was also runner-up to Schilder at the 2025 European Athletics Team Championships First Division in Madrid. She went on to represent Germany at the 2025 World Championships in Tokyo, Japan, where she placed sixth in the final.

In March 2026, she set a personal best 20.37 metres to win the German Indoor Championships in Dortmund. Later that month, she placed fifth at the 2026 World Athletics Indoor Championships in Toruń. In May 2026, she competed as Yemisi Mabry at the 2026 Shanghai Diamond League, throwing 18.55 m.

== Personal life ==
Ogunleye is a gospel singer. She is married to former American football player Tyler Mabry.

== Statistics ==
=== Personal best progression ===
Shot Put progression
#	Mark	Pl.	Competition	Venue	Date	Ref.
1	12.50 m	13th	German U20 Indoor Championships	Sindelfingen, Germany	15 Feb 2014	
2	13.23 m	2nd place, silver medalist(s)	Coupe de L'amitié	Sarreguemines, France	28 May 2014	
3	13.73 m	2nd place, silver medalist(s)	Nationales Hallensportfest der LG Eintracht Frankfurt	Frankfurt, Germany	9 Jan 2016	
4	13.81 m	3rd place, bronze medalist(s)	Baden-Württembergische Hallenmeisterschaften	Karlsruhe, Germany	22 Jan 2016	
5	14.08 m	4th	Süddeutsche Hallenmeisterschaften, Glaspalast	Sindelfingen, Germany	29 Jan 2016	
6	14.34 m	1st place, gold medalist(s)		Mannheim, Germany	28 Jan 2017	
7	14.77 m	1st place, gold medalist(s)		Mannheim, Germany	10 Feb 2017	
8	15.23 m	3rd place, bronze medalist(s)	German U20 Indoor Championships	Sindelfingen, Germany	25 Feb 2017	
9	15.43 m	1st place, gold medalist(s)	France-Germany-Italy U20 Indoor Match	Halle, Germany	3 Mar 2017	
10	15.65 m	1st place, gold medalist(s)		Mannheim, Germany	21 Apr 2017	
11	16.04 m	3rd place, bronze medalist(s)		Heilbronn, Germany	27 May 2017	
12	16.50 m	6th	Hallesche Werfertage, Sportzentrum Brandberge	Halle, Germany	25 May 2018	
13	16.63 m	2nd place, silver medalist(s)	Süddeutsche Meisterschaften Aktive / U18	St. Wendel, Germany	29 Jun 2019	
14	17.06 m	1st place, gold medalist(s)	Abendsportfest	Mannheim, Germany	3 Jul 2019	
15	17.34 m	1st place, gold medalist(s)	MTG Wurfmeeting	Mannheim, Germany	14 Jul 2020	
16	17.36 m	2nd place, silver medalist(s)	Wurf-Gala U23	Halle, Germany	14 Aug 2020	
17	17.65 m	2nd place, silver medalist(s)	Renault Schmid Werfertag 2021 Teil 2	Bad Boll, Germany	8 May 2021	
18	18.13 m	3rd place, bronze medalist(s)	German Athletics Championships	Braunschweig, Germany	4 Jun 2021	
19	18.14 m	1st place, gold medalist(s)	LO Kugelstoßen im Kurpark Bad Liebenzell	Bad Liebenzell, Germany	12 Jul 2022	
20	18.20 m	1st place, gold medalist(s)	Deutsche Hochschulmeisterschaft	Darmstadt, Germany	18 May 2023	
21	18.53 m	5th	HALPLUS Werfertage	Halle, Germany	20 May 2023	
22	19.31 m	1st place, gold medalist(s)	58th International Pentecost Sport Meeting	Rehlingen, Germany	28 May 2023	
23	19.44 m	(bronze) (Qualification)	World Athletics Championships	Budapest, Hungary	25 Aug 2023	
24	19.57 m	1st place, gold medalist(s)	Nordhausen-Indoor Kugelstoßen	Nordhausen, Germany	27 Jan 2024	
25	20.19 m	2nd place, silver medalist(s)	World Athletics Indoor Championships	Glasgow, Scotland	1 Mar 2024	
