= 2017 German Indoor Athletics Championships =

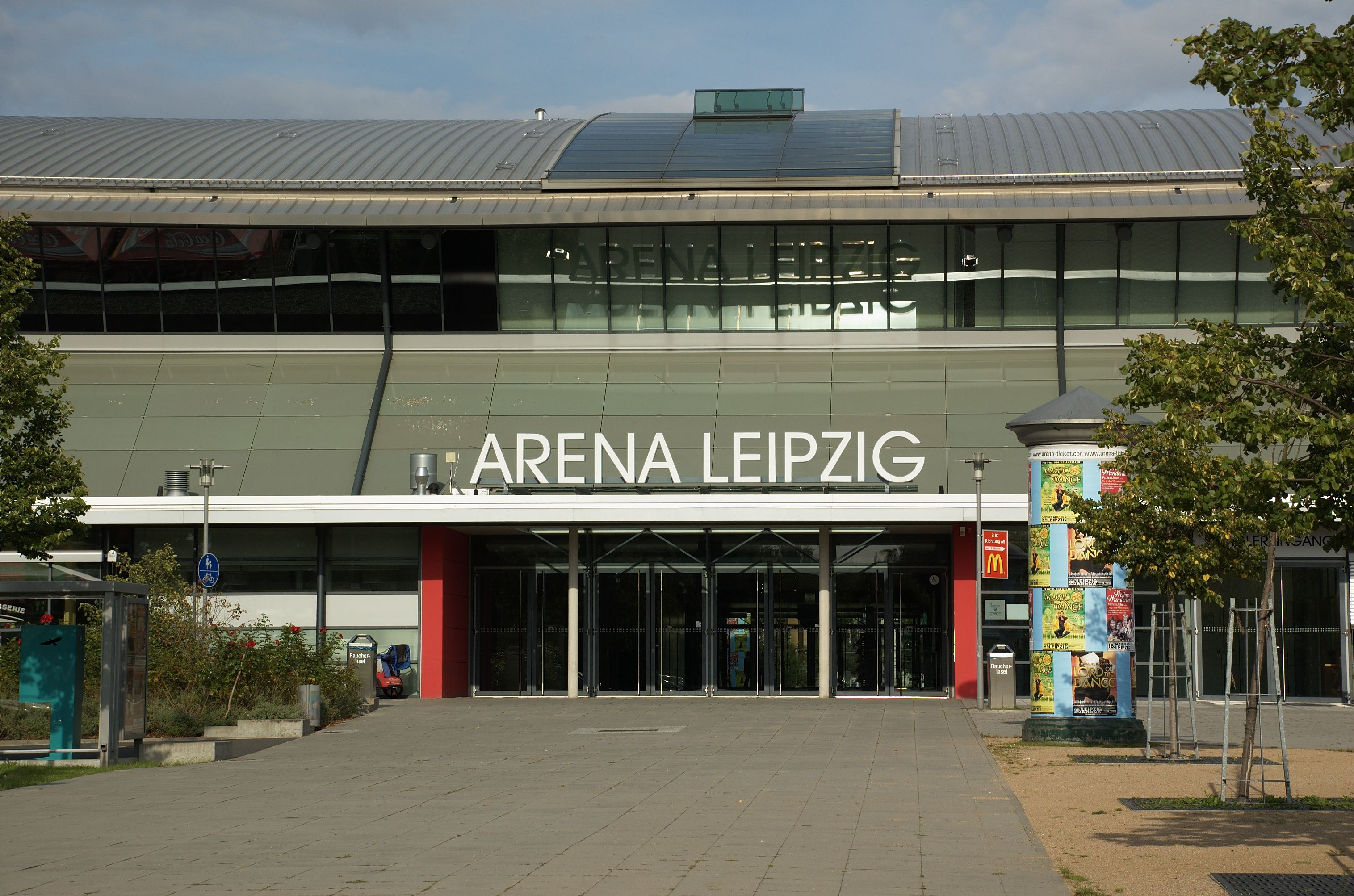
- The host stadium
- Dates: 18–19 February
- Host city: Leipzig
- Venue: Arena Leipzig
- Events: 25+6

The 2017 German Indoor Athletics Championships (German: Deutsche Leichtathletik-Hallenmeisterschaften 2017) was the 64th edition of the national championship in indoor track and field for Germany. It was held on 18–19 February at the Arena Leipzig in Leipzig – the seventh time the venue had hosted the championships. Ticketing for the event was sold out. A total of 25 events, 13 for men and 12 for women, were contested plus six further events were held separately. It was to serve as preparation for the 2017 European Athletics Indoor Championships.

Several national championship events were staged elsewhere: 3 × 800 m and 3 × 1000 m relays were held on 26 February at the Glaspalast Sindelfingen in Sindelfingen, while racewalking events were hosted at the Leichtathletikhalle Erfurt in Erfurt on 5 March. Indoor combined events were held at the Leichtathletik-Halle in Hamburg on 28 and 29 January.

== Results ==
=== Men ===
Event	Gold		Silver		Bronze	
60 metres	Michael Bryan; TSG 1862 Weinheim	6.67 s	Maurice Huke; TV Wattenscheid	6.68 s	Robin Erewa; TV Wattenscheid	6.68 s
200 metres	Robin Erewa; TV Wattenscheid	20.52 s	Aleixo-Platini Menga; TSV Bayer 04 Leverkusen	20.96 s	Maurice Huke; TV Wattenscheid	21.00 s
400 metres	Marc Koch; LG Nord Berlin	46.40 s	Marvin Schlegel; LAC Erdgas Chemnitz	46.78 s	Florian Weeke; LT DSHS Köln	10.28 s
800 metres	Robert Farken; SC DHfK Leipzig	1:49.78 min	Christoph Kessler; LG Region Karlsruhe	1:49.81 min	Jan Riedel; Dresdner SC 1898	1:50.06 min
1500 metres	Marius Probst; TV Wattenscheid	3:41.40 min	Florian Orth; LG Telis Finanz Regensburg	3:44.48 min	Stefan Hettich; TSV Gomaringen	3:46.64 min
3000 metres	Richard Ringer; VfB Friedrichshafen	7:59.68 min	Florian Orth; LG Telis Finanz Regensburg	8:01.10 min	Timo Benitz; LG farbtex Nordschwarzwald	8:01.31 min
5000 m walk	Christopher Linke; SC Potsdam	19:08.82 min	Nils Brembach; SC Potsdam	19:16.67 min	Karl Junghannß; Erfurter LAC	19:53.44 min
60 m hurdles	Erik Balnuweit; TV Wattenscheid	7.62 s	Michael Pohl; Wiesbadener LV	7.74 s	Roy Schmidt; SC DHfK Leipzig	7.75 s
4 × 200 m relay	TV Wattenscheid; Robin Erewa; Maurice Huke; Carlo Weckelmann; Maximilian Ruth	1:24.83 min	TSV Bayer 04 Leverkusen; Daniel Hoffmann; Tobias Lange; Christian Heimann; Robert Polkowski	1:26.39 min	SC Magdeburg; Jonas Bernhagen; Thomas Barthel; Moritz Andrä; Maurice Fritz Ahlfaenger	1:28.13 min
3 × 1000 m relay	LG farbtex Nordschwarzwald; Sebastian Karl; Denis Bäuerle; Timo Benitz	7:19.75 min	LG Region Karlsruhe; Christoph Uhl; Holger Körner; Christoph Kessler	7:22.38 min	LSC Höchstadt/Aisch; Tobias Budde; Marco Kürzdörfer; Martin Grau	7:25.63 min
High jump	Mateusz Przybylko; TSV Bayer 04 Leverkusen	2.20 m	Tobias Potye; LG Stadtwerke München	2.20 m	Tim Schenker; LAC Erdgas Chemnitz	2.17 m
Pole vault	Raphael Holzdeppe; LAZ Zweibrücken	5.68 m	Florian Gaul; VfL Sindelfingen	5.58 m	Malte Mohr; TV Wattenscheid	5.48 m
Long jump	Julian Howard; LG Region Karlsruhe	7.82 m	Gianluca Puglisi; Königsteiner LV	7.71 m	Philipp Menn; LG Kindelsberg Kreuztal	7.61 m
Triple jump	Max Heß; LAC Erdgas Chemnitz	16.71 m	Vincent Vogel; LAC Erdgas Chemnitz	15.43 m	Martin Japer; VfB Stuttgart 1893	15.37 m
Shot put	David Storl; SC DHfK Leipzig	20.98 m	Dennis Lewke; SC Magdeburg	19.25 m	Bodo Göder; SR Yburg Steinbach	19.02 m
Heptathlon	Mathias Brugger; SSV Ulm 1846	5981 pts	Tim Nowak; SSV Ulm 1846	5815 pts	Marvin Gregor; LC Paderborn	5208 pts

=== Women ===
Event	Gold		Silver		Bronze	
60 metres	Gina Lückenkemper; LG Olympia Dortmund	7.14 s	Rebekka Haase; LV 90 Erzgebirge	7.16 s	Lisa Mayer; Sprintteam Wetzlar	7.18 s
200 metres	Rebekka Haase; LV 90 Erzgebirge	22.77 s	Lara Matheis; TSG Gießen-Wieseck	23.22 s	Nadine Gonska; MTG Mannheim	23.48 s
400 metres	Lara Hoffmann; LT DSHS Köln	52.90 s	Carolin Walter; TSV Bayer 04 Leverkusen	53.60 s	Laura Gläsner; VfL Eintracht Hannover	53.65 s
800 metres	Christina Hering; LG Stadtwerke München	2:06.52	Mareen Kalis; LG Stadtwerke München	2:07.41 min	Rebekka Ackers; TSV Bayer 04 Leverkusen	2:08.93 min
1500 metres	Konstanze Klosterhalfen; TSV Bayer 04 Leverkusen	4:04.91 min	Denise Krebs; TV Wattenscheid	4:25.34 min	Lena Klaassen; TSV Bayer 04 Leverkusen	4:26.07 min
3000 metres	Alina Reh; SSV Ulm 1846	8:53.56 min	Gesa Felicitas Krause; Silvesterlauf Trier	8:56.13 min	Hanna Klein; SG Schorndorf 1846	8:57.86 min
3000 m walk	Teresa Zurek; SC Potsdam	13:15.10 min	Julia Richter; SC Potsdam	13:40.78 min	Julia Henze; ASV Erfurt	14:31.50 min
60 m hurdles	Pamela Dutkiewicz; TV Wattenscheid 01	7.79 s	Cindy Roleder; SV Halle	7.84 s	Ricarda Lobe; MTG Mannheim	7.99 s
4 × 200 m relay	LG Olympia Dortmund; Marilena Scharff; Gina Lückenkemper; Alexandra Selzer; Klara Leusch	1:35.41 min	SCC Berlin; Svea Köhrbrück; Hendrikje Richter; Carolin Lachmann; Alena Gerken	1:37.10 min	LC Paderborn; Inna Weit; Josefina Elsler; Alina Kuß; Chantal Butzek	1:37.12 min
3 × 800 m relay	TSV Bayer 04 Leverkusen 1 Carolin Walter; Sarah Schmidt; Konstanze Klosterhalfen	6:16.25 min	LG Stadtwerke München; Katharina Trost; Christine Gess; Mareen Kalis	6:28.67 min	TSV Bayer 04 Leverkusen 2 Rebekka Ackers; Fiona Kierdorf; Lena Klaassen	6:32.55 min
High jump	Marie-Laurence Jungfleisch; VfB Stuttgart	1.92 m	Jossie Graumann; LG Nord Berlin	1.89 m	Katarina Mögenburg; TSV Bayer 04 Leverkusen	1.83 m
Pole vault	Lisa Ryzih; ABC Ludwigshafen	4.65 m	Annika Roloff; MTV 49 Holzminden	4.40 m	Regine Kramer; TSV Bayer 04 Leverkusen	4.30 m
Long jump	Claudia Salman-Rath; LG Eintracht Frankfurt	6.72 m	Alexandra Wester; ASV Köln	6.48 m	Xenia Stolz; Wiesbadener LV	6.34 m
Triple jump	Jenny Elbe; Dresdner SC	14.07 m	Kristin Gierisch; LAC Erdgas Chemnitz	13.69 m	Neele Eckhardt; LG Göttingen	13.61 m
Shot put	Christina Schwanitz; LV 90 Erzgebirge	18.50 m	Alina Kenzel; VfL Waiblingen	17.28 m	Katharina Maisch; TuS Metzingen	17.11 m
Pentathlon	Mareike Arndt; TSV Bayer 04 Leverkusen	4210 pts	Sophie Hamann; TuS Metzingen	4066 pts	Vanessa Grimm; LG Reinhardswald	3941 pts
