= 2020 German Indoor Athletics Championships =

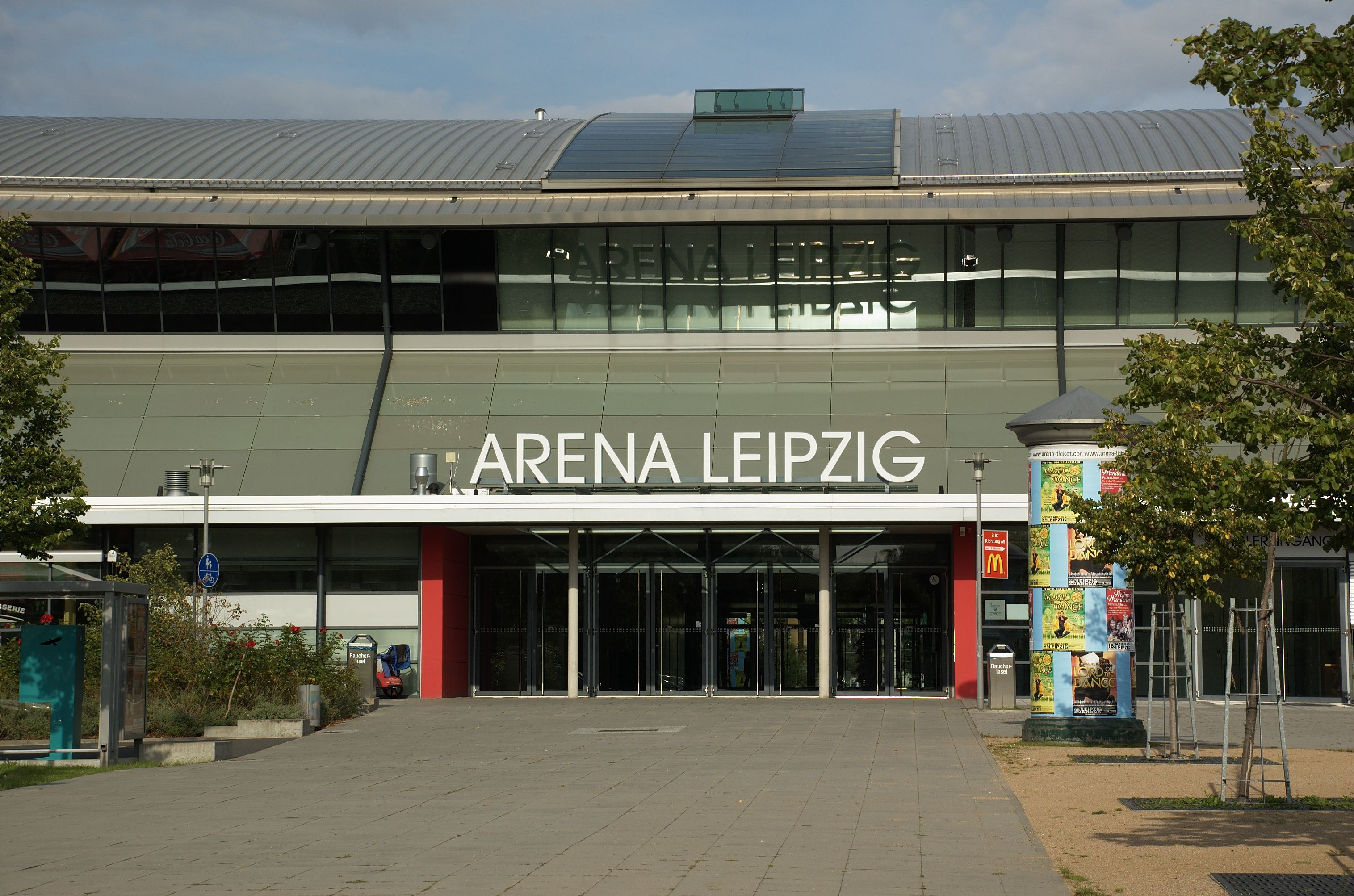
- The host stadium
- Dates: 22–23 February
- Host city: Leipzig
- Venue: Arena Leipzig
- Events: 24+6

The 2020 German Indoor Athletics Championships (German: Deutsche Leichtathletik-Hallenmeisterschaften 2020) was the 67th edition of the national championship in indoor track and field for Germany. It was held on 22–23 February at the Arena Leipzig in Leipzig. A total of 24 events, 12 for men and 12 for women, were contested. It was to serve as preparation for the 2020 World Athletics Indoor Championships, which was postponed due to the COVID-19 outbreak in China before the German championships.

Several national championship events were staged elsewhere: combined events were held on 1–2 February in Leverkusen, relays were held on 16 February in Neubrandenburg, while racewalking events were hosted in Erfurt on 28 February.

== Results ==
=== Men ===
Event	Gold		Silver		Bronze	
60 metres	Deniz Almas; VfL Wolfsburg	6.60 s	Julian Wagner; LAC Erfurt	6.64 s	Aleksandar Askovic; LG Augsburg	6.66 s
200 metres	Robin Erewa; TV Wattenscheid 01	20.80 s	Felix Straub; SC DHfK Leipzig	20.83 s	Owen Ansah; Hamburger SV	21.15 s
400 metres	Kevin Joite; Dresdner SC	47.13 s	Justus Baumgarten; SCL Heel Baden-Baden	47.64 s	Lukas Peter; SC Jena	48.12 s
800 metres	Robert Farken; SC DHfK Leipzig	1:50.39 min	Julius Lawnik; LG Braunschweig	1:51.38 min	Dennis Biederbeck; LG Eintracht Frankfurt	1:51.39 min
1500 metres	Timo Benitz; LG farbtex Nordschwarzwald	3:55.66 min	Marius Probst; TV Wattenscheid 01	3:56.14 min	Marc Tortell; Athletics Team Karben	3:56.43 min
3000 metres	Maximilian Thorwirth; SFD 75 Düsseldorf-Süd	7:53.31 min	Martin Grau; LAC Erfurt	7:56.20 min	Florian Orth; LG Telis Finanz Regensburg	7:59.10 min
60 m hurdles	Gregor Traber; LAV Tübingen	7.59 s	Stefan Volzer; VfL Sindelfingen	7.93 s	Tim Eikermann; TSV Bayer 04 Leverkusen	7.96 s
4 × 200 m relay	TSV Bayer 04 Leverkusen; Aleixo-Platini Menga; Daniel Hoffmann; Sven Bulik; Fabian Bürckel	1:24.33 min	TV Wattenscheid 2 Robin Erewa; Noel-Philippe Fiener; Carlo Weckelmann; Philipp Trutenat	1:24.85 min	LG Stadtwerke München; Fabian Olbert; Jakob Matauschek; Vincente Graiani; Yannick Wolf	1:25.69 min
3 × 1000 m relay	LG Braunschweig; Max Dieterich; Julius Lawnik; Viktor Kuk	7:17.61 min	LG Region Karlsruhe; Alexander Kessler; Lorenz Herrmann; Holger Körner	7:30.60 min	TSV Schott Mainz; Thorben Juschka; Erik Barzen; Tobias Riker	7:38.29 min
5000 m walk	Andreas Janker; LG Röthenbach	20:51.77 min	Steffen Borsch; SV Halle	21:42.84 min	Only two finishers	
High jump	Mateusz Przybylko; TSV Bayer 04 Leverkusen	2.23 m	Tobias Potye; LG Stadtwerke München	2.20 m	Benno Freitag; SSV Ulm 1846	2.17 m
Pole vault	Bo Kanda Lita Baehre; TSV Bayer 04 Leverkusen	5.70 m	Oleg Zernikel; ASV Landau	5.40 m	Karsten Dilla; TSV Bayer 04 Leverkusen	5.40 m
Long jump	Maximilian Entholzner; 1. FC Passau	7.81 m	Gianluca Puglisi; Königsteiner LV	7.77 m	Julian Howard; LG Region Karlsruhe	7.77 m
Triple jump	Felix Wenzel; SC Potsdam	15.74 m	Max-Ole Klobasa; LC Jena	15.59 m	Vincent Vogel; LAC Erdgas Chemnitz	15.47 m
Shot put	David Storl; SC DHfK Leipzig	20.58 m	Tobias Dahm; VfL Sindelfingen	20.13 m	Dennis Lewke; SC DHfK Leipzig	20.03 m
Heptathlon	Andreas Bechmann; LG Eintracht Frankfurt	6097 pts	Felix Wolter; TSV Gräfelfing	5550 pts	Nico Beckers; Aachener TG	5495 pts

=== Women ===
Event	Gold		Silver		Bronze	
60 metres	Lisa-Marie Kwayie; Neuköllner Sportfreunde	7.21 s	Malaika Mihambo; LG Kurpfalz	7.22	Lisa Mayer; Sprintteam Wetzlar	7.24
200 metres	Jessica-Bianca Wessolly; MTG Mannheim	23.37 s	Amelie-Sophie Lederer; LG Telis Finanz Regensburg	23.62 s	Louisa Grauvogel; TSV Bayer 04 Leverkusen	23.77 s
400 metres	Corinna Schwab; LG Telis Finanz Regensburg	52.65 s	Laura Müller; LC Rehlingen	52.92 s	Hannah Mergenthaler; MTG Mannheim	53.39 s
800 metres	Christina Hering; LG Stadtwerke München	2:02.14 min	Katharina Trost; LG Stadtwerke München	2:02.74 min	Majtie Kolberg; LG Kreis Ahrweiler	2:06.27 min
1500 metres	Hanna Klein; LAV Stadtwerke Tübingen	4:22.43 min	Caterina Granz; LG Nord Berlin	4:24.21 min	Vera Hoffmann; LC Rehlingen	4:25.96 min
3000 metres	Hanna Klein; LAV Stadtwerke Tübingen	9:21.72 min	Caterina Granz; LG Nord Berlin	9:24.71 min	Svenja Pingpank; Hannover Athletics	9:25.61 min
60 m hurdles	Caroline Klein; TSV Bayer 04 Leverkusen	8.15 s	Ricarda Lobe; MTG Mannheim	8.19 s	Lisa Maihöfer; LC Rehlingen	8.24 s
4 × 200 m relay	TSV Bayer 04 Leverkusen 1 Jennifer Montag; Louisa Grauvogel; Mareike Arndt; Caroline Klein	1:35.40 min	LG Telis Finanz Regensburg; Corinna Schwab; Maike Schachtschneider; Mona Mayer; Katrin Fehm	1:36.14 min	TV Wattenscheid 01; Synthia Oguama; Christin Bischoff; Sophie Bleibtreu; Felina-Malin Fiener	1:36.55 min
3 × 800 m relay	ASV Köln 1 Kim Uhlendorf; Christina Zwirner; Vera Coutellier	6:37.81 min	LG Region Karlsruhe; Sophia Seiter; Antje Pfüller; Adeline Haisch	6:38.36 min	SG VfL Eintracht Hannover/VfL Oldenburg; Jana Schlüsche; Sarah Fleur Schulze; Ann-Kathrin Kopf	6:39.80 min
3000 m walk	Josephine Grandi; SC Potsdam	14:20.82 min	Sarah Friedrich; LG Würm Athletik	14:22.10 min	Alina Leipe; SC Potsdam	15:23.98 min
High jump	Laura Gröll; LG Stadtwerke München	1.86 m	Katarina Mögenburg; TSV Bayer 04 Leverkusen	1.83 m	Bianca Stichling; TSG 1862 Weinheim	1.83 m
Pole vault	Lisa Ryzih; ABC Ludwigshafen	4.45 m	Stefanie Dauber; SSV Ulm 1846	4.30 m	Janina Pollatz; SC Potsdam	4.20 m
Long jump	Malaika Mihambo; LG Kurpfalz	6.77 m	Maryse Luzolo; Königsteiner LV	6.44 m	Merle Homeier; LG Göttingen	6.41 m
Triple jump	Neele Eckhardt; LG Göttingen	14.09 m	Kristin Gierisch; LAC Erdgas Chemnitz	14.03 m	Jessie Maduka; ART Düsseldorf	13.40 m
Shot put	Alina Kenzel; VfL Waiblingen	18.14 m	Katharina Maisch; LV 90 Erzgebirge	17.98 m	Julia Ritter; TV Wattenscheid 01	17.46 m
Pentathlon	Vanessa Grimm; Königsteiner LV	4263 pts	Janina Lange; MTV Lübeck	4200 pts	Mareike Arndt; TSV Bayer 04 Leverkusen	4110 pts
