= German Indoor Athletics Championships =

Annual track and field competition

- Sport: Indoor track and field
- Founded: 1991
- Country: Germany

The German Indoor Athletics Championships (German: Deutsche Leichtathletik-Hallenmeisterschaften) is an annual indoor track and field competition organised by the German Athletics Association, which serves as the German national championship for the sport. Typically held over two to three days in February during the German winter, the first Unified Germany championships occurred in 1991, succeeding the West German and East German indoor nationals. The unified indoor event preceded the newly-unified outdoor German Athletics Championships in the summer of 1991. National indoor championships in relays, racewalking and combined track and field events are usually contested at separate locations.

== Events ==
The following athletics events feature as standard on the German Indoor Championships programme:

- Sprint: 60 m, 200 m, 400 m
- Distance track events: 800 m, 1500 m, 3000 m
- Hurdles: 60 m hurdles
- Jumps: long jump, triple jump, high jump, pole vault
- Throws: shot put

In addition, the below events have indoor national championships contested annually at separate locations:

- Racewalking: 5000 m (men), 3000 m (women)
- Combined events: heptathlon (men), pentathlon (women)
- Relays: 4 × 200 m relay, 3 × 1000 m relay

== Editions ==
Year	Location	Venue	Date
1991	Dortmund	Helmut-Körnig-Halle	16–17 February
1992	Karlsruhe	Europahalle	8–9 February
1993	Sindelfingen	Glaspalast	27–28 February
1994	Dortmund	Helmut-Körnig-Halle	25–26 February
1995	Sindelfingen	Glaspalast	25–26 February
1996	Karlsruhe	Europahalle	24–25 February
1997	Dortmund	Helmut-Körnig-Halle	22–23 February
1998	Sindelfingen	Glaspalast	14–15 February
1999	Karlsruhe	Europahalle	20–21 February
2000	Sindelfingen	Glaspalast	12–13 February
2001	Dortmund	Helmut-Körnig-Halle	24–25 February
2002	Sindelfingen	Glaspalast	16–17 February
2003	Leipzig	Arena Leipzig	22–23 February
2004	Dortmund	Helmut-Körnig-Halle	21–22 February
2005	Sindelfingen	Glaspalast	19–20 February
2006	Karlsruhe	Europahalle	25–26 February
2007	Leipzig	Arena Leipzig	17–18 February
2008	Sindelfingen	Glaspalast	23–24 February
2009	Leipzig	Arena Leipzig	21–22 February
2010	Karlsruhe	Europahalle	27–28 February
2011	Leipzig	Arena Leipzig	26–27 February
2012	Karlsruhe	Europahalle	25–26 February
2013	Dortmund	Helmut-Körnig-Halle	23–24 February
2014	Leipzig	Arena Leipzig	22–23 February
2015	Karlsruhe	Messehalle 2	21–22 February
2016	Leipzig	Arena Leipzig	27–28 February
2017	Leipzig	Arena Leipzig	18–19 February
2018	Dortmund	Helmut-Körnig-Halle	17–18 February
2019	Leipzig	Arena Leipzig	16–17 February
2020	Leipzig	Arena Leipzig	22–23 February
2021	Dortmund	Helmut-Körnig-Halle	19–20 February
2022	Leipzig	Arena Leipzig	26–27 February
2023	Dortmund	Helmut-Körnig-Halle	18–19 February
2024	Leipzig	Arena Leipzig	17–18 February
2025	Dortmund	Helmut-Körnig-Halle	21–23 February
2026	Dortmund	Helmut-Körnig-Halle	27 February–1 March

== Records ==
=== Men ===
Event	Record	Athlete/Team	Date	Championships	Place	Ref.	Video
60 m	6.52 =NR	Kevin Kranz	20 February 2021	2021 Championships	Dortmund		
200 m	20.42	Sebastian Ernst	27 February 2011	2011 Championships	Leipzig		
400 m	45.95	Jean Paul Bredau	18 February 2024	2024 Championships	Leipzig		
800 m	1:45.38	Nico Motchebon	1999	1999 Championships	Karlsruhe		
1500 m	3:36.36	Marius Probst	18 February 2024	2024 Championships	Leipzig		
3000 m	7:39.32	Dieter Baumann	1997	1997 Championships	Dortmund		
60 m hurdles	7.53	Falk Balzer	1996	1996 Championships	Karlsruhe		
High jump	2.35 m	Ralf Sonn	1992	1992 Championships	Karlsruhe		
Pole vault	5.92 m	Björn Otto	26 February 2012	2012 Championships	Karlsruhe		
Long jump	8.13 m	Sebastian Bayer	2009	2009 Championships	Leipzig		
Triple jump	17.10 m	Ralf Jaros	1997	1997 Championships			
Shot put	21.43 m	Ralf Bartels	2006	2006 Championships	Karlsruhe		
Heptathlon							
Heptathlon	60m / Long jump / Shot put / High jump / 60m H / Pole vault / 1000m						
5000 m walk							
4 × 200 m relay	1:23.51 NR	TV Wattenscheid 01; Julian Reus; Robin Erewa; Sebastian Ernst; Alexander Kosenkow	23 February 2014	2014 Championships	Leipzig		

=== Women ===
Event	Record	Athlete/Team	Date	Place	Ref.	Video
60 m	7.06	Katrin Krabbe	1991	Dortmund		
60 m	7.06	Tatjana Pinto	17 February 2018	Dortmund		
200 m	22.71	Grit Breuer	1992	Karlsruhe		
400 m	51.48	Shanta Gosh	2001	Dortmund		
800 m	2:01.29	Carolin Walter	26 February 2012	Karlsruhe		
1500 m	4:04.91	Konstanze Klosterhalfen	19 February 2017	Leipzig		
3000 m	8:32.47 NR	Konstanze Klosterhalfen	16 February 2019	Leipzig		
60 m hurdles	7.79	Pamela Dutkiewicz	18 February 2017	Leipzig		
High jump	2.07 m	Heike Henkel	8 February 1992	Karlsruhe		
Pole vault	4.65 m	Lisa Ryzih	27 February 2011	Leipzig		
Long jump	7.18 m	Heike Drechsler	1991	Dortmund		
Triple jump	14.38 m	Kristin Gierisch	16 February 2019	Leipzig		
Shot put	20.25 m	Astrid Kumbernuss	1996	Karlsruhe		
Pentathlon						
Pentathlon	60m H / High jump / Shot put / Long jump / 800m					
3000 m walk						
4 × 200 m relay	1:32.55	LG Olympia Dortmund; Sandra Möller; Gabi Rockmeier; Birgit Rockmeier; Andrea Philipp	21 February 1999	Karlsruhe		

== See also ==
- List of German records in athletics
