= 2018 German Indoor Athletics Championships =

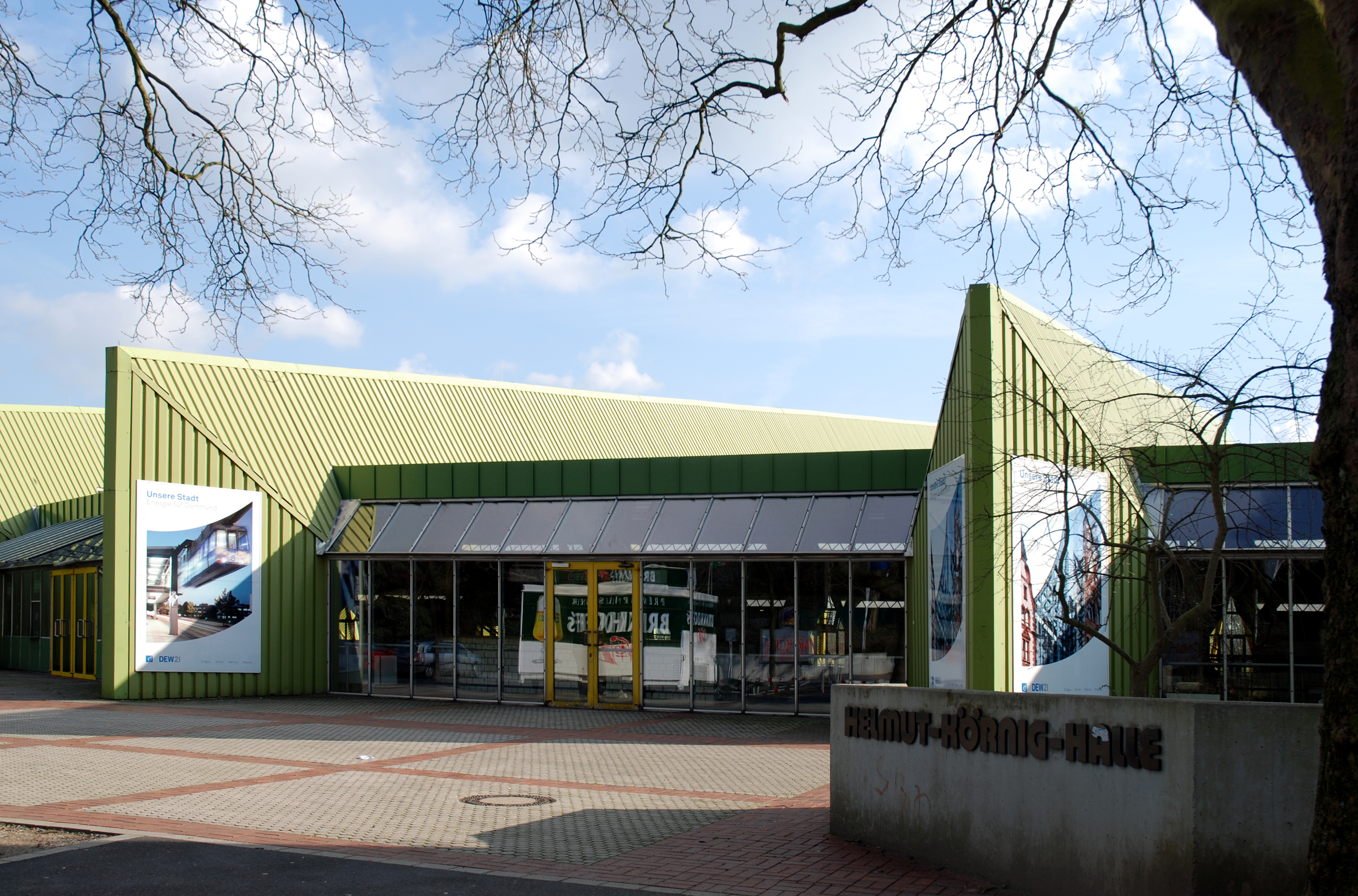
- The host stadium
- Dates: 17–18 February
- Host city: Dortmund
- Venue: Helmut-Körnig-Halle
- Events: 24+4

The 2018 German Indoor Athletics Championships (German: Deutsche Leichtathletik-Hallenmeisterschaften 2018) was the 65th edition of the national championship in indoor track and field for Germany. It was held on 17–18 February at the Helmut-Körnig-Halle in Dortmund – the eleventh time the venue had hosted the championships. A total of 24 events, 12 for men and 12 for women, were contested plus four further events were held separately. It was to serve as preparation for the 2018 IAAF World Indoor Championships.

Several national championship events were staged elsewhere: 3 × 800 m and 3 × 1000 m relays were held on 25 February at the Sporthalle Brandberge in Halle, while racewalking events were hosted in Erfurt on 2 March. Indoor combined events were not held that year as the event did not find an organiser.

Konstanze Klosterhalfen of TSV Bayer 04 Leverkusen set a German indoor record in the women's 3000 metres, clocking 8:36.01 minutes.

== Results ==
=== Men ===
Event	Gold		Silver		Bronze	
60 metres	Julian Reus; Erfurter LAC	6.61 s	Michael Pohl; Sprintteam Wetzlar	6.63 s	Thanusanth Balasubramaniam; LAZ Saarbrücken	6.67 s
200 metres	Steven Müller; LG OVAG Friedbach-Fauerbach	21.05 s	Maurice Huke; TV Wattenscheid 01	21.07 s	Raphael Müller; VfB Stuttgart	21.54 s
400 metres	Thomas Schneider; TSV Bayer 04 Leverkusen	47.80 s	Torben Junker; LG Olympia Dortmund	47.92 s	Fabian Dammermann; LG Osnabrück	48.55 s
800 metres	Marc Reuther; Wiesbadener LV	1:48.39 min	Dennis Biederbick; Wiesbadener LV	1:49.44 min	Constantin Schulz; LC Cottbus	1:49.48 min
1500 metres	Sebastian Keiner; Erfurter LAC	3:50.12 min	Martin Sperlich; VfB LC Friedrichshafen	3:50.32 min	Marvin Heinrich; Wiesbadener LV	3:50.34 min
3000 metres	Richard Ringer; VfB LC Friedrichshafen	8:10.14 min	Clemens Bleistein; LG Stadtwerke München	8:10.23 min	Timo Benitz; LG farbtex Nordschwarzwald	8:12.68 min
5000 m walk	Nils Brembach; SC Potsdam	19:10.13 min	Andreas Janker; LG Röthenbach/Pegnitz	20:56.83 min	Steffen Borsch; SV Halle	21:40.09 min
60 m hurdles	Erik Balnuweit; TV Wattenscheid	7.65 s	Maximilian Bayer; MTV Ingolstadt	7.84 s	Patrick Elger; LAC Erdgas Chemnitz	7.91 s
4 × 200 m relay	LG Rhein-Wied; Kai Kazmirek; Pascal Kirstges; Daniel Roos; Darius Mann	1:26.90 min	SC Magdeburg; Thomas Barthel; Till Helbig; Moritz Andrä; Marvin Lee Kühnen	1:27.68 min	LT DSHS Köln; Dennis Horn; Marc van Rechtern; Philip Blümel; Michel Richert	1:29.56 min
3 × 1000 m relay	StG Erfurt-Jena; Tim Stegemann; Philipp Reinhardt; Sebastian Keiner	7:23.39 min	LG farbtex Nordschwarzwald; Timo Benitz; Denis Bäuerle; Hendrik Engel	7:24.60 min	LG Region Karlsruhe; Christoph Kessler; Holger Körner; Christoph Uhl	7:25.89 min
High jump	Mateusz Przybylko; TSV Bayer 04 Leverkusen	2.30 m	Martin Günther; VfB Stuttgart	2.18 m	Bastian Rudolf; Dresdner SC	2.18 m
Pole vault	Raphael Holzdeppe; LAZ Zweibrücken	5.68 m	Karsten Dilla; TSV Bayer 04 Leverkusen	5.58 m	Gordon Porsch; LG OVAG Friedberg-Fauerbach	5.58 m
Long jump	Julian Howard; LG Region Karlsruhe	7.74 m	Ituah Enahoro; LAV Bayer Uerdingen/Dormagen	7.50 m	Kai Kazmirek; LG Rhein-Wied	7.47 m
Triple jump	Max Heß; LAC Erdgas Chemnitz	16.84 m	Benjamin Bauer; LAC Erdgas Chemnitz	15.82 m	David Kirch; LG Stadtwerke München	15.62 m
Shot put	David Storl; SC DHfK Leipzig	21.19 m	Tobias Dahm; VfL Sindelfingen	19.57 m	Dennis Lewke; SC Magdeburg	19.41 m

=== Women ===
Event	Gold		Silver		Bronze	
60 metres	Tatjana Pinto; LC Paderborn	7.06 s	Keshia Kwadwo; TV Wattenscheid	7.36 s	Lisa Nippgen; LAZ Ludwigsburg	7.40 s
200 metres	Tatjana Pinto; LC Paderborn	23.19 s	Lisa Nippgen; LAZ Ludwigsburg	23.93 s	Jessica-Bianca Wessolly; MTG Mannheim	24.09 s
400 metres	Nadine Gonska; MTG Mannheim	52.84 s	Alena Gerken; SCC Berlin	54.26 s	Svea Köhrbrück; SCC Berlin	54.72 s
800 metres	Christina Hering; LG Stadtwerke München	2:06.93 min	Tanja Spill; LAV Bayer Uerdingen/Dormagen	2:07.07 min	Jana Reinert; LG Region Karlsruhe	2:07.49 min
1500 metres	Diana Sujew; LG Eintracht Frankfurt	4:30.54 min	Hanna Klein; SG Schorndorf	4:31.07 min	Vera Hoffmann; ASV Köln	4:31.41 min
3000 metres	Konstanze Klosterhalfen; TSV Bayer 04 Leverkusen	8:36.01 min NR	Gesa Felicitas Krause; Silvesterlauf Trier	8:54.08 min	Caterina Granz; LG Nord Berlin	8:56.29 min
3000 m walk	Teresa Zurek; SC Potsdam	12:43.38 min	Saskia Feige; SC Potsdam	12:50.99 min	Only two starters	
60 m hurdles	Cindy Roleder; SV Halle	7.84 s	Pamela Dutkiewicz; TV Wattenscheid 01	7.89 s	Franziska Hofmann; LAC Erdgas Chemnitz	8.15 s
4 × 200 m relay	TV Wattenscheid 01; Keshia Kwadwo; Pamela Dutkiewicz; Monika Zapalska; Maike Schachtschneider	1:35.30 min	MTG Mannheim; Nadine Gonska; Jessica-Bianca Wessolly; Ricarda Lobe; Katrin Wallmann	1:35.42 min	LC Paderborn; Tatjana Pinto; Alina Kuß; Janina Kölsch; Ina Thimm	1:37.23 min
3 × 800 m relay	TSV Bayer 04 Leverkusen; Rebekka Ackers; Denise Krebs; Sarah Schmidt	6:26.27 min	SG Schorndorf; Gina Daubenfeld; Anna Karina Becker; Hanna Klein	6:28.73 min	LG Nord Berlin; Isabella Kuhn; Caterina Granz; Martha Sauter	6:29.54 min
High jump	Marie-Laurence Jungfleisch; VfB Stuttgart; Leonie Reuter; LG Nord Berlin	1.83 m	Not awarded		Katarina Mögenburg; TSV Bayer 04 Leverkusen	1.83 m
Pole vault	Katharina Bauer; TSV Bayer 04 Leverkusen	4.51 m	Lisa Ryzih; ABC Ludwigshafen	4.46 m	Friedelinde Petershofen; SC Potsdam	4.41 m
Long jump	Malaika Mihambo; LG Kurpfalz	6.68 m	Nadja Käther; Hamburger SV	6.49 m	Melanie Bauschke; LAC Olympia 88 Berlin	6.44 m
Triple jump	Neele Eckhardt; LG Göttingen	14.13 m	Jessie Maduka; ART Düsseldorf	13.81 m	Birte Damerius; TSV Rudow 1888	13.19 m
Shot put	Alina Kenzel; VfL Waiblingen	17.37 m	Lena Urbaniak; LG Filstal	16.82 m	Josephine Terlecki; SV Halle	16.67 m
