= List of German records in athletics =

The following are the national records in athletics in Germany maintained by its national athletics federation, Deutscher Leichtathletik-Verband (DLV).

The lists do differ according to whether a German athlete started at the time of preparation of the relevant records for the Association of Germany (DLV) or the German Democratic Republic (DVfL).

In 2006 the DLV extended its list of records with a preamble:

"According to present evidence the following list includes some record holders suspected of having violated anti-doping rules during their sporting career. In addition, a part of the records was achieved with a basis of forced doping and doping in the form of bodily harm. (...) A deletion of such records is not possible for legal reasons."

In 2010 Gesine Walther had her name removed from the 4 × 400 m relay record, because it was by her own admission achieved by doping. She said she would "feel responsible should young athletes use drugs in an effort to try to beat this record."

== Outdoor ==
Key to tables: Awaiting ratification Record not kept by DLV Not ratified or later rescinded by DLV

=== Men ===
Event	Record	Athlete	Date	Meet	Place	Ref.	Video
100 y	9.53+ (+0.8 m/s)	Julian Reus	27 June 2013	Golden Spike Ostrava	Ostrava, Czech Republic		
100 m	9.98 (+0.8 m/s)	Owen Ansah	6 June 2026	Sparkassen Gala 2026	Regensburg, Germany		
150 m (bend)	15.20 (±0.0 m/s)	Joshua Hartmann	16 June 2026	Golden Spike Ostrava	Ostrava, Czech Republic		
200 m	20.02 (+0.6 m/s)	Joshua Hartmann	9 July 2023	German Championships	Kassel, Germany		
300 m	32.45	Hartmut Weber	4 June 1982		Dormagen, West Germany		
400 m	44.33	Thomas Schönlebe	3 September 1987	World Championships	Rome, Italy		
500 m	1:00.35	Hartmut Weber	8 May 1983		Nußdorf, West Germany		
600 m	1:15.1	Edgar Itt	19 April 1994		Mainz, Germany		
800 m	1:43.65	Willi Wülbeck	9 August 1983	World Championships	Helsinki, Finland		
1000 m	2:14.53	Willi Wülbeck	1 July 1980	Bislett Games	Oslo, Norway		
1500 m	3:30.09+	Robert Farken	18 July 2026	London Athletics Meet	London, United Kingdom		
Mile	3:46.82	Robert Farken	18 July 2026	London Athletics Meet	London, United Kingdom		
Mile (road)	3:51.80	Robert Farken	19 September 2026	World Road Running Championships	Copenhagen, Denmark		
2000 m	4:52.20	Thomas Wessinghage	31 August 1982		Ingelheim, West Germany		
3000 m	7:25.77	Mohamed Abdilaahi	16 May 2026	Shanghai Diamond League	Shaoxing/Keqiao, China		
Two miles	8:27.88	Mohamed Abdilaahi	9 June 2023	Meeting de Paris	Paris, France		
5000 m	12:53.63	Mohamed Abdilaahi	11 July 2025	Herculis	Fontvieille, Monaco		
5 km (road)	13:17	Mohamed Abdilaahi	13 December 2025	Al Sharqiyah International Race	Khobar, Saudi Arabia		
10,000 m	27:21.53	Dieter Baumann	5 April 1997		Baracaldo, Spain		
10,000 m	26:56.58	Mohamed Abdilaahi	28 March 2026	The TEN	San Juan Capistrano, United States		
10 km (road)	27:32	Amanal Petros	26 February 2023	10K Facsa Castellón	Castellón, Spain		
10 km (road)	27:22	Mohamed Abdilaahi	11 January 2026	10K Valencia Ibercaja by Kiprun	Valencia, Spain		
15 km (road)	42:08+	Amanal Petros	29 March 2026	Berlin Half Marathon	Berlin, Germany		
20,000 m (track)	58:30.2+ h	Werner Schildhauer	29 April 1983		Cottbus, East Germany		
20 km (road)	59:00	Stephan Freigang	13 March 1994	20 van Alphen	Alphen aan den Rijn, Netherlands		
One hour	20536 m	Werner Schildhauer	29 April 1983		Cottbus, East Germany		
Half marathon	59:31	Amanal Petros	6 April 2025	Berlin Half Marathon	Berlin, Germany		
Half marathon	59:22	Amanal Petros	29 March 2026	Berlin Half Marathon	Berlin, Germany		
25,000 m (track)	1:13:57.6+	Stéphane Franke	30 March 1999		Walnut, United States		
25 km (road)	1:13:58	Karl Fleschen	16 April 1978		Frankenberg (Eder), West Germany		
25 km (road)	1:13:40+	Amanal Petros	24 September 2023	Berlin Marathon	Berlin, Germany		
25 km (road)	1:13:45+	Samuel Fitwi Sibhatu	1 December 2024	Valencia Marathon	Valencia, Spain		
30,000 m (track)	1:33:35.6	Stéphane Franke	30 March 1999		Walnut, United States		
30 km (road)	1:28:16+	Amanal Petros	24 September 2023	Berlin Marathon	Berlin, Germany		
Marathon	2:04:03 (Note: by official result source and World Athletics; 2:04:02 by DLV source, a typo)	Amanal Petros	7 December 2025	Valencia Marathon	Valencia, Spain		
100 km (road)	6:24:29	Kazimierz Bak	26 June 1994		Saroma, Japan		
24-hour run	278.312 km	Felix Weber	27–28 May 2023	German 24-hour run Championships	Braunschweig, Germany		
110 m hurdles	13.05 (−0.8 m/s)	Florian Schwarthoff	2 July 1995	German Championships	Bremen, Germany		
200 m hurdles	22.5 h	Martin Lauer	7 July 1959		Zürich, Switzerland		
300 m hurdles	34.58	Emil Agyekum	12 June 2025	Bislett Games	Oslo, Norway		
400 m hurdles	47.48	Harald Schmid	8 September 1982		Athens, Greece		
400 m hurdles	47.45	Emil Agyekum	18 July 2026	London Athletics Meet	London, United Kingdom		
400 m hurdles	47.10	Emil Agyekum	13 September 2026	World Athletics Ultimate Championship	Budapest, Hungary		
2000 m steeplechase	5:18.29	Karl Bebendorf	31 May 2026	Goldenes Oval Dresden	Dresden, Germany		
3000 m steeplechase	7:57.80	Frederik Ruppert	31 May 2026	Meeting International Mohammed VI d'Athlétisme de Rabat	Rabat, Morocco		
High jump	2.37 m	Carlo Thränhardt	2 September 1984	IAAF Grand Prix	Rieti, Italy		
Pole vault	6.01 m	Björn Otto	5 September 2012	Domspringen	Aachen, Germany		
Long jump	8.54 m (+0.9 m/s)	Lutz Dombrowski	28 July 1980	Olympic Games	Moscow, Soviet Union		
Triple jump	17.66 m (+1.7 m/s)	Ralf Jaros	30 June 1991		Frankfurt, Germany		
Shot put	23.06 m	Ulf Timmermann	22 May 1988		Chania, Greece		
Discus throw	74.08 m	Jürgen Schult	6 June 1986		Neubrandenburg, East Germany		
Hammer throw	83.40 m	Ralf Haber	16 May 1988		Athens, Greece		
Javelin throw	97.76 m	Johannes Vetter	6 September 2020	Skolimowska Memorial	Chorzów, Poland		
Javelin throw	104.80 m (Old design)	Uwe Hohn	20 July 1984		East Berlin, East Germany		
Decathlon	8961 pts	Leo Neugebauer	5–6 June 2024	NCAA Division I Championships	Eugene, United States		
Decathlon	100m (wind) / Long jump (wind) / Shot put / High jump / 400m / 110m H (wind) / Discus / Pole vault / Javelin / 1500m; 10.64 (+0.1 m/s) / 7.86 m (+0.9 m/s) / 17.46 m / 2.07 m / 48.03 / 14.36 (±0.0 m/s) / 57.70 m / 5.21 m / 56.64 m / 4:44.61						
Mile walk (track)	5:40.04	Christopher Linke	5 June 2022	Janusz Kusociński Memorial	Chorzów, Poland		
10,000 m walk (track)	38:12.13	Ronald Weigel	11 May 1986		Potsdam, East Germany		
20,000 m walk (track)	1:19:18.3	Ronald Weigel	26 May 1990		Bergen, Norway		
20 km walk (road)	1:18:12	Christopher Linke	19 August 2023	World Championships	Budapest, Hungary		
Two hours walk (track)	27153 m	Bernd Kannenberg	11 April 1974		Kassel, West Germany		
30,000 m walk (track)	2:11:52.8	Robert Ihly	4 September 1992		Biesheim, Germany		
35 km walk (road)	2:23:21	Christopher Linke	18 May 2025	European Race Walking Team Championships	Poděbrady, Czech Republic		
50,000 m walk (track)	3:52:46.6	Robert Ihly	29 September 1996		Héricourt, France		
50 km walk (road)	3:37:46	Andreas Erm	27 August 2003	World Championships	Paris, France		
100 km walk (road)	9:01:29	Sten Reichel	26 October 2000		Bergamo, Italy		
4 × 100 m relay	37.97	Germany; Kevin Kranz; Joshua Hartmann; Owen Ansah; Lucas Ansah-Peprah	19 August 2022	European Championships	Munich, Germany		
4 × 100 m relay	37.67	Germany; Kevin Kranz; Marvin Schulte; Owen Ansah; Lucas Ansah-Peprah	2 May 2026	World Athletics Relays	Gaborone, Botswana		
4 × 200 m relay	1:21.26	Germany; Maurice Huke; Patrick Domogala; Aleixo-Platini Menga; Robin Erewa	12 May 2019	IAAF World Relays	Yokohama, Japan		
4 × 400 m relay	2:59.86	East Germany; Frank Möller; Mathias Schersing; Jens Carlowitz; Thomas Schönlebe	23 June 1985		Erfurt, East Germany		
4 × 800 m relay	7:08.6	West Germany; Kinder; Adams; Bogatzki; Kemper	13 August 1966		Wiesbaden, West Germany		
Distance medley relay	9:24.37	Germany; Sebastian Keiner (1200 m); Jonas Plass (400 m); Robin Schembera (800 m); Florian Orth (1600 m)	3 May 2015	IAAF World Relays	Nassau, Bahamas		
4 × 1500 m relay	14:38.8	West Germany; Thomas Wessinghage; Hudak; Lederer; Karl Fleschen	17 August 1977		Cologne, West Germany		

=== Women ===
Event	Record	Athlete	Date	Meet	Place	Ref.	Video
100 m	10.81 (+1.7 m/s)	Marlies Göhr	8 June 1983		East Berlin, East Germany		
150 m (bend)	17.38 (+0.4 m/s)	Lisa Nippgen	5 May 2024	Internationales Läufermeeting	Pliezhausen, Germany		
200 m	21.71 (+0.7 m/s)	Marita Koch	10 June 1979		Karl-Marx-Stadt, East Germany		
200 m	21.71 (+0.3 m/s)	Marita Koch	21 July 1984		Potsdam, East Germany		
200 m	21.71 (+1.2 m/s)	Heike Drechsler	29 June 1986		Jena, East Germany		
200 m	21.71 (−0.8 m/s)	Heike Drechsler	29 August 1986		Stuttgart, West Germany		
300 m	35.81	Silke Knoll	19 May 1990		Olpe, West Germany		
300 m	34.14+ ^{[WB]}	Marita Koch	6 October 1985	World Cup	Canberra, Australia		
400 m	47.60	Marita Koch	6 October 1985	World Cup	Canberra, Australia		
600 m	1:23.78+	Anita Weiß	24 July 1976		Montreal, Canada		
800 m	1:55.26	Sigrun Wodars	31 August 1987	World Championships	Rome, Italy		
1000 m	2:30.67	Christine Wachtel	17 August 1990	ISTAF	East Berlin, East Germany		
1500 m	3:57.71	Christiane Wartenberg	1 August 1980	Olympic Games	Moscow, Soviet Union		
Mile	4:21.11	Konstanze Klosterhalfen	18 August 2019	Diamond League	Birmingham, United Kingdom		
Mile (road)	4:33.44 Wo	Verena Meisl	6 September 2026	New Balance Kö Meile	Düsseldorf, Germany		
2000 m	5:34.53	Konstanze Klosterhalfen	17 September 2021	SWT-Flutlichtmeeting	Trier, Germany		
3000 m	8:20.07	Konstanze Klosterhalfen	30 June 2019	Prefontaine Classic	Stanford, United States		
Two miles	9:16.73	Konstanze Klosterhalfen	27 May 2022	Prefontaine Classic	Eugene, United States		
5000 m	14:26.76	Konstanze Klosterhalfen	3 August 2019	German Championships	Berlin, Germany		
5 km (road)	14:52 Mx	Konstanze Klosterhalfen	31 December 2022	Cursa dels Nassos	Barcelona, Spain		
10,000 m	31:01.71	Konstanze Klosterhalfen	27 February 2021	Trials of Miles Texas Qualifier	Austin, United States		
10 km (road)	30:46	Konstanze Klosterhalfen	24 May 2025	Ruta Villa de Laredo	Laredo, Spain		
10 km (road)	30:37	Konstanze Klosterhalfen	18 April 2026	Ruta Villa de Laredo	Laredo, Spain		
15 km (road)	46:25+ Wo	Melat Yisak Kejeta	17 October 2020	World Half Marathon Championships	Gdynia, Poland		
One hour	17709 m	Katrin Dörre	7 July 1988		Leipzig, East Germany		
20,000 m (track)	1:10:50.2+ h	Christa Vahlensieck	25 October 1975		Essen, West Germany		
20 km (road)	1:02:04+ Wo	Melat Yisak Kejeta	17 October 2020	World Half Marathon Championships	Gdynia, Poland		
Half marathon	1:05:18 Wo	Melat Yisak Kejeta	17 October 2020	World Half Marathon Championships	Gdynia, Poland		
25 km (road)	1:23:07+	Irina Mikitenko	28 September 2008	Berlin Marathon	Berlin, Germany		
30 km (road)	1:39:34+	Irina Mikitenko	28 September 2008	Berlin Marathon	Berlin, Germany		
Marathon	2:19:19	Irina Mikitenko	28 September 2008	Berlin Marathon	Berlin, Germany		
100 km (road)	7:18:57	Birgit Lennartz	28 April 1990		Hanau, West Germany		
24 hours	254.288 km	Nele Alder-Baerens	26–27 October 2019	IAU 24 Hour World Championship	Albi, France		
100 m hurdles	12.42 (+1.8 m/s)	Bettine Jahn	8 June 1983		East Berlin, East Germany		
200 m hurdles (bend)	25.8 h (+0.6 m/s)	Annelie Jahns-Erdhardt	5 July 1970		Erfurt, East Germany		
300 m hurdles	38.87	Eileen Demes	5 May 2024	Internationales Läufermeeting	Pliezhausen, Germany		
400 m hurdles	53.24	Sabine Busch	21 August 1987		Potsdam, East Germany		
Mile steeplechase	4:51.87	Olivia Gürth	22 August 2025	Memorial Van Damme	Brussels, Belgium		
2000 m steeplechase	5:52.80 WB	Gesa-Felicitas Krause	1 September 2019	ISTAF Berlin	Berlin, Germany		
3000 m steeplechase	9:03.30	Gesa-Felicitas Krause	28 September 2019	World Championships	Doha, Qatar		
High jump	2.06 m	Ariane Friedrich	14 June 2009	ISTAF	Berlin, Germany		
Pole vault	4.82 m	Silke Spiegelburg	20 July 2012	Herculis	Fontvieille, Monaco		
Long jump	7.48 m (+1.2 m/s)	Heike Drechsler	9 July 1988		Neubrandenburg, East Germany		
Long jump	7.48 m (+0.4 m/s)	Heike Drechsler	8 July 1992		Lausanne, Switzerland		
Triple jump	14.57 m (+1.2 m/s)	Katja Demut	13 June 2011	17th Weseler Springermeeting	Fränkisch-Crumbach, Germany		
Shot put	22.45 m	Ilona Slupianek	11 May 1980		Potsdam, East Germany		
Discus throw	76.80 m	Gabriele Reinsch	9 July 1988		Neubrandenburg, East Germany		
Hammer throw	79.42 m	Betty Heidler	21 May 2011	Hallesche Werfertage	Halle (Saale), Germany		
Javelin throw	70.20 m (Current design)	Christina Obergföll	23 June 2007		Munich, Germany		
Javelin throw	80.00 m (old design)	Petra Felke	9 September 1988		Potsdam, East Germany		
Heptathlon	6985 pts	Sabine Braun	30–31 May 1992	Hypo-Meeting	Götzis, Austria		
Heptathlon	100m H (wind) / High jump / Shot put / 200m (wind) / Long jump (wind) / Javelin / 800m; 13.11 / 1.93 m / 14.84 m / 23.65 (+2.0 m/s) / 6.63 m / 51.62 m / 2:12.67						
Decathlon	7885 pts	Mona Steigauf	20–21 September 1997		Ahlen, Germany		
Decathlon	12.15 (100 m), 5.93 m (long jump), 12.49 m (shot put), 1.73 m (high jump), 55.34 (400 m) / 13.75 (100 m hurdles), 34.68 m (discus), 3.10 m (pole vault), 42.24 m (javelin), 5:07.95 (1500 m)						
3000 m walk (track)	11:52.01	Beate Anders	27 June 1993		Lapinlahti, Finland		
5000 m walk (track)	20:11.45	Sabine Zimmer	2 July 2005	German Championships	Wattenscheid, Germany		
5 km walk (road)	20:54	Beate Anders	12 May 1990		A Coruña, Spain		
10,000 m walk (track)	42:11.5	Beate Anders	15 May 1992		Bergen, Norway		
10 km walk (road)	41:51	Beate Gummelt	11 May 1996	Oder-Neisse Race Walk Grand Prix	Eisenhüttenstadt, Germany		
20,000 m walk (track)	1:40:42.0	Annett Amberg	3 October 1998		Laucha, Germany		
20 km walk (road)	1:27:56	Sabine Zimmer	5 June 2004		Hildesheim, Germany		
50 km walk (road)	5:22:25	Ulrike Sischka	15 October 2006		Scanzorosciate, Italy		
4 × 100 m relay	41.37	East Germany; Silke Gladisch; Sabine Rieger; Ingrid Auerswald; Marlies Göhr	6 October 1985	World Cup	Canberra, Australia		
4 × 200 m relay	1:28.15	East Germany; Marlies Göhr; Petra Müller; Bärbel Wöckel; Marita Koch	9 August 1980		Jena, East Germany		
4 × 400 m relay	3:15.92	East Germany; Gesine Walther; Sabine Busch; Dagmar Rübsam; Marita Koch	3 June 1984		Erfurt, East Germany		
4 × 800 m relay	7:54.2	East Germany; Elfi Zinn; Gunhild Hoffmeister; Anita Weiß; Ulrike Bruns	6 August 1976		Karl-Marx-Stadt, East Germany		
Distance medley relay	11:06.14	Germany; Diana Sujew (1200 m); Janin Lindenberg (400 m); Christina Hering (800 m); Gesa Felicitas Krause (1600 m)	2 May 2015	IAAF World Relays	Nassau, Bahamas		

=== Mixed ===
Event	Record	Athlete	Date	Meet	Place	Ref.
4 × 100 m relay	40.15 A	Germany; Yannick Wolf; Sophia Junk; Heiko Gussmann; Sina Kammerschmitt	2 May 2026	World Relays	Gaborone, Botswana	
4 × 400 m relay	3:12.94	Germany; Marvin Schlegel; Corinna Schwab; Ruth Spelmeyer; Manuel Sanders	30 July 2021	Olympic Games	Tokyo, Japan	

== Indoor ==
=== Men ===
Event	Record	Athlete	Date	Meet	Place	Ref.	Video
50 m	5.61	Manfred Kokot	4 February 1973		East Berlin, East Germany		
55 m	6.13 A	Frank Emmelmann	3 February 1984		Albuquerque, United States		
60 m	6.52	Julian Reus	27 February 2016	German Championships	Leipzig, Germany		
60 m	6.52	Kevin Kranz	20 February 2021	German Championships	Dortmund, Germany		
200 m	20.42	Sebastian Ernst	27 February 2011	German Championships	Leipzig, Germany		
300 m	32.72	Erwin Skamrahl	31 January 1986	BW-Bank Meeting	Karlsruhe, West Germany		
400 m	45.05	Thomas Schönlebe	5 February 1988		Sindelfingen, West Germany		
500 m	1:01.06	Carsten Köhrbrück	5 January 1991		Berlin, Germany		
600 m	1:15.12	Nico Motchebon	28 February 1999		Sindelfingen, Germany		
800 m	1:44.88	Nico Motchebon	5 February 1995	Sparkassen Cup	Stuttgart, Germany		
1000 m	2:17.09	Jens-Peter Herold	5 February 1993		Berlin, Germany		
1500 m	3:33.14+	Robert Farken	8 February 2025	Millrose Games	New York City, United States		
Mile	3:50.45	Amos Bartelsmeyer	11 February 2023	David Hemery Valentine Invitational	Boston, United States		
2000 m	4:56.23	Jens-Peter Herold	6 March 1993	BW-Bank Meeting	Sindelfingen, Germany		
3000 m	7:37.51	Dieter Baumann	12 February 1995	BW-Bank Meeting	Karlsruhe, Germany		
Two miles	8:30.2 h	Thomas Wessinghage	5 February 1982		Inglewood, United States		
5000 m	13:06.38	Mohamed Abdilaahi	21 February 2025	BU DMR Challenge	Boston, United States		
50 m hurdles	6.45	Thomas Munkelt	10 February 1979		Ottawa, Canada		
60 m hurdles	7.41	Falk Balzer	29 January 1999		Chemnitz, Germany		
High jump	2.42 m (Note: outdoor mark ratified as absolute record)	Carlo Thränhardt	26 February 1988		West Berlin, West Germany		
Pole vault	6.00 m	Daniel Ecker	11 February 2001		Dortmund, Germany		
Long jump	8.71 m (Note: outdoor mark ratified as absolute record)	Sebastian Bayer	8 March 2009	European Championships	Turin, Italy		
Triple jump	17.52 m	Max Heß	3 March 2017	European Championships	Belgrade, Serbia		
Shot put	22.55 m	Ulf Timmermann	11 February 1989		Senftenberg, East Germany		
Weight throw	23.69 m	Alexander Ziegler	22 February 2013		Blacksburg, United States		
Discus throw	64.82 m	Martin Wierig	1 March 2014	ISTAF Indoor	Berlin, Germany		
Discus throw	66.20 m	Wolfgang Schmidt	1980		East Berlin, East Germany		
Heptathlon	6388 pts	Till Steinforth	7–8 March 2025	European Championships	Apeldoorn, Netherlands		
Heptathlon	60m / Long jump / Shot put / High jump / 60m H / Pole vault / 1000m; 6.80 / 7.89 m / 14.95 m / 1.98 m / 7.90 / 5.00 m / 2:36.69						
Mile walk	5:35.83	Christopher Linke	8 February 2025	USA 1 Mile Race Walking Championships	New York City, United States		
3000 m walk	10:31.42	Andreas Erm	4 February 2001		Halle (Saale), Germany		
5000 m walk	18:11.41 Mx	Ronald Weigel	13 February 1988		Vienna, Austria		
5000 m walk	18:22.25	Andreas Erm	25 February 2001		Dortmund, Germany		
20,000 m walk	1:20:40.0 OT	Ronald Weigel	27 January 1980		Senftenberg, East Germany		
4 × 200 m relay	1:23.51	TV Wattenscheid 01; Julian Reus; Robin Erewa; Sebastian Ernst; Alexander Kosenkow	23 February 2014	German Championships	Leipzig, Germany		
4 × 400 m relay	3:03.05	Germany; Rico Lieder; Jens Carlowitz; Karsten Just; Thomas Schönlebe	10 March 1991	World Championships	Seville, Spain		

=== Women ===
Event	Record	Athlete	Date	Meet	Place	Ref.	Video
50 m	6.11	Marita Koch	2 February 1980		Grenoble, France		
50 m	6.0 h	Renate Stecher	14 February 1971		East Berlin, East Germany		
50 m	6.0 h	Renate Stecher	20 February 1971		East Berlin, East Germany		
50 m	6.0 h	Renate Stecher	28 February 1971		East Berlin, East Germany		
50 m	6.0 h	Annegret Richter	6 March 1977		Dortmund, West Germany		
55 m	6.62 (Note: Converted from a time for the slightly shorter 60 yards by adding 0.01)	Marlies Göhr	28 February 1986		New York City, United States		
60 m	7.04	Marita Koch	16 February 1985		Senftenberg, East Germany		
60 m	7.04	Silke Gladisch-Möller	6 March 1988		Budapest, Hungary		
60 m	6.9 h	Marlies Göhr	10 February 1979		Cottbus, East Germany		
100 m	11.15 ^{[WB]}	Marita Koch	12 January 1980		East Berlin, East Germany		
200 m	22.27	Heike Drechsler	7 March 1987	World Championships	Indianapolis, United States		
300 m	36.49	Helga Arendt	5 February 1988		Sindelfingen, West Germany		
400 m	50.01	Sabine Busch	2 February 1984		Vienna, Austria		
500 m	1:08.63	Sandra Seuser	9 January 1993		Berlin, Germany		
800 m	1:56.40	Christine Wachtel	13 February 1988		Vienna, Austria		
1000 m	2:34.8	Brigitte Kraus	19 February 1978		Dortmund, West Germany		
1500 m	3:59.87+	Konstanze Klosterhalfen	8 February 2020	Millrose Games	New York City, United States		
Mile	4:17.26	Konstanze Klosterhalfen	8 February 2020	Millrose Games	New York City, United States		
2000 m	5:42.55	Kathleen Friedrich	22 February 2002	Erdgas Meeting	Chemnitz, Germany		
3000 m	8:32.47	Konstanze Klosterhalfen	16 February 2019	German Championships	Leipzig, Germany		
Two miles	9:34.27	Ines Bibernell	28 February 1986		New York City, United States		
5000 m	14:30.79	Konstanze Klosterhalfen	27 February 2020	BU Last Chance Invitational	Boston, United States		
50 m hurdles	6.58	Cornelia Oschkenat	20 February 1988		East Berlin, East Germany		
55 m hurdles	7.37	Cornelia Oschkenat	27 February 1987	USA Championships	New York City, United States		
60 m hurdles	7.73	Cornelia Oschkenat	25 February 1989		Vienna, Austria		
High jump	2.07 m	Heike Henkel	8 February 1992	German Championships	Karlsruhe, Germany		
Pole vault	4.77 m	Silke Spiegelburg	15 January 2012	Nordrhein Regional Championships	Leverkusen, Germany		
Long jump	7.37 m	Heike Drechsler	13 February 1988		Vienna, Austria		
Triple jump	14.47 m	Katja Demut	11 February 2011	PSD Bank Meeting	Düsseldorf, Germany		
Shot put	21.59 m	Ilona Slupianek	24 January 1979		East Berlin, East Germany		
Discus throw	62.07 m	Shanice Craft	14 February 2015	ISTAF Indoor	Berlin, Germany		
Discus throw	63.89 m Mx	Nadine Müller	1 February 2019	ISTAF Indoor	Berlin, Germany		
Discus throw	64.03 m Mx	Shanice Craft	14 February 2020	ISTAF Indoor	Berlin, Germany		
Discus throw	65.23 m Mx	Shanice Craft	10 February 2023	ISTAF Indoor	Berlin, Germany		
Pentathlon	4780 pts	Sabine Braun	7 March 1997	World Championships	Paris, France		
Pentathlon	60m H / High jump / Shot put / Long jump / 800m; 8.11 / 1.86 m / 14.39 m / 6.40 m / 2:19.74						
Pentathlon	4995 pts OT	Anke Behmer	2 February 1988		Senftenberg, East Germany		
Pentathlon	60m H / High jump / Shot put / Long jump / 800m; 8.21 / 1.78 m / 14.94 m / 6.80 m / 2:07.72						
Pentathlon	4995 pts OT	Anke Behmer	25 February 1988		Senftenberg, East Germany		
Pentathlon	60m H / High jump / Shot put / Long jump / 800m; 8.27 / 1.83 m / 14.95 m / 6.66 m / 2:08.03						
3000 m walk	11:50.48	Melanie Seeger	21 February 2004		Dortmund, Germany		
5000 m walk	20:48.0	Sabine Zimmer	19 December 2006		Halle (Saale), Germany		
4 × 100 m relay	44.39 ^{[WB]}	Germany; Anne-Kathrin Elbe; Anne Möllinger; Cathleen Tschirch; Marion Wagner	31 January 2010	BW-Bank Meeting	Karlsruhe, Germany		
4 × 200 m relay	1:32.55	SC Eintracht Hamm; Helga Arendt; Silke Knoll; Mechthild Kluth; Gisela Kinzel	20 February 1988		Dortmund, Germany		
4 × 200 m relay	1:32.55	LG Olympia Dortmund; Sandra Möller; Gabi Rockmeier; Birgit Rockmeier; Andrea Philipp	21 February 1999	German Championships	Karlsruhe, Germany		
4 × 400 m relay	3:27.22	Germany; Sandra Seuser; Katrin Schreiter; Annett Hesselbarth; Grit Breuer	10 March 1991	World Championships	Seville, Spain		
