= Regine Bakenecker =

German pole vaulter

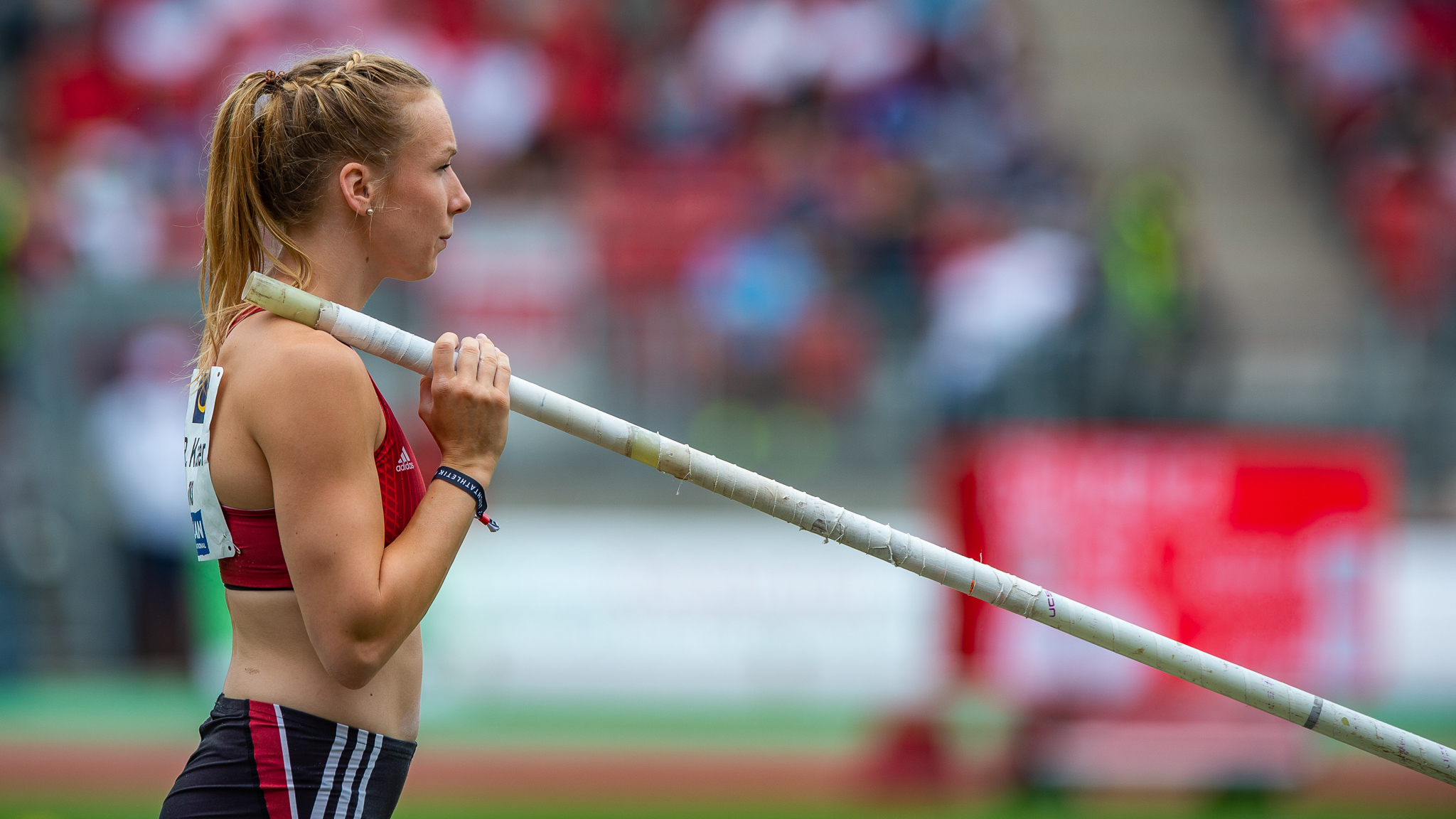
- Bakenecker at the 2018 German Athletics Championships

Personal information
- Nationality: German
- Born: Regine Kramer; April 5, 1993 (age 33)

Sport
- Sport: Athletics
- Event: Pole vault
- Club: TSV Bayer 04 Leverkusen

Achievements and titles
- World finals: European Youth Olympic Festival; 2009: 9th, pole vault
- Personal best: PV: 4.40 m (2016, 2018)

Regine Bakenecker (née Kramer; born 5 April 1993) is a German pole vaulter. She is a two-time top three finisher at the German Athletics Championships.

== Biography ==
Kramer's first international championship was the 2009 European Youth Olympic Festival, where she finished 9th in the women's pole vault with a mark of 3.55 metres.

In 2016, Kramer placed 6th at the new Rabat Diamond League, scoring one point in the 2016 Diamond League standings. Later that year she won the Adidas BOOST meeting in Herzogenaurach.

Kramer's best finishes at the German Athletics Championships came in 2017, placing 3rd at the indoor championships, and two years later (now competing as Bakenecker after her marriage in 2018), placing 3rd again at the 2019 German Indoor Athletics Championships.

== Statistics ==
=== Personal bests ===
Event	Mark	Competition	Venue	Date
Pole vault	4.40 m	Engener Stabhochsprungmeeting	Engen, Germany	8 May 2016
Long jump	5.23 m (+0.9 m/s)		Leverkusen, Germany	13 May 2012
