= 2023 German Indoor Athletics Championships =

- Dates: 18-19 February
- Host city: Dortmund
- Venue: Helmut-Körnig-Halle
- 260 px
- Level: Senior
- Events: 28

2023 German Athletics Indoor Championships were the 70th edition of the German Indoor Athletics Championships held in Dortmund.

== Champions ==
Event	Men	Performance	Women	Performance
60 m	Aleksandar Askovic	6.56 PB	Gina Lückenkemper	7.17
400 m	Marvin Schlegel	46.25 PB	Skadi Schier	52.93
800 m	Marius Probst	1:50.75	Jolanda Kallabis	2:03.71
1500 m	Amos Bartelsmeyer	3:47.38	Katharina Trost	4:11.87
3000 m	Nils Voigt	7:56.80	Konstanze Klosterhalfen	8:34.89
60 m hurdles	Tim Eikermann	7.63	Monika Zapalska	8.10
High jump	Tobias Potye	2.28 m SB	Christina Honsel	1.88 m
Pole vault	Torben Blech and Bo Kanda Lita Baehre	5.72 m	Anjuli Knäsche	4.45 m
Long jump	Simon Batz	7.86 m	Malaika Mihambo	6.66 m
Triple jump	Max Heß	16.73 m	Kira Wittmann	14.08 m
Shot put	Simon Bayer	20.20 m	Sara Gambetta	18.38 m
Combined events (heptathlon/pentathlon)	Nico Beckers	5807 pts	Laura Voß	4146 pts

Note:

- Full results.

== See also ==
- 2023 German Athletics Championships
