= Robin Schembera =

German middle-distance runner

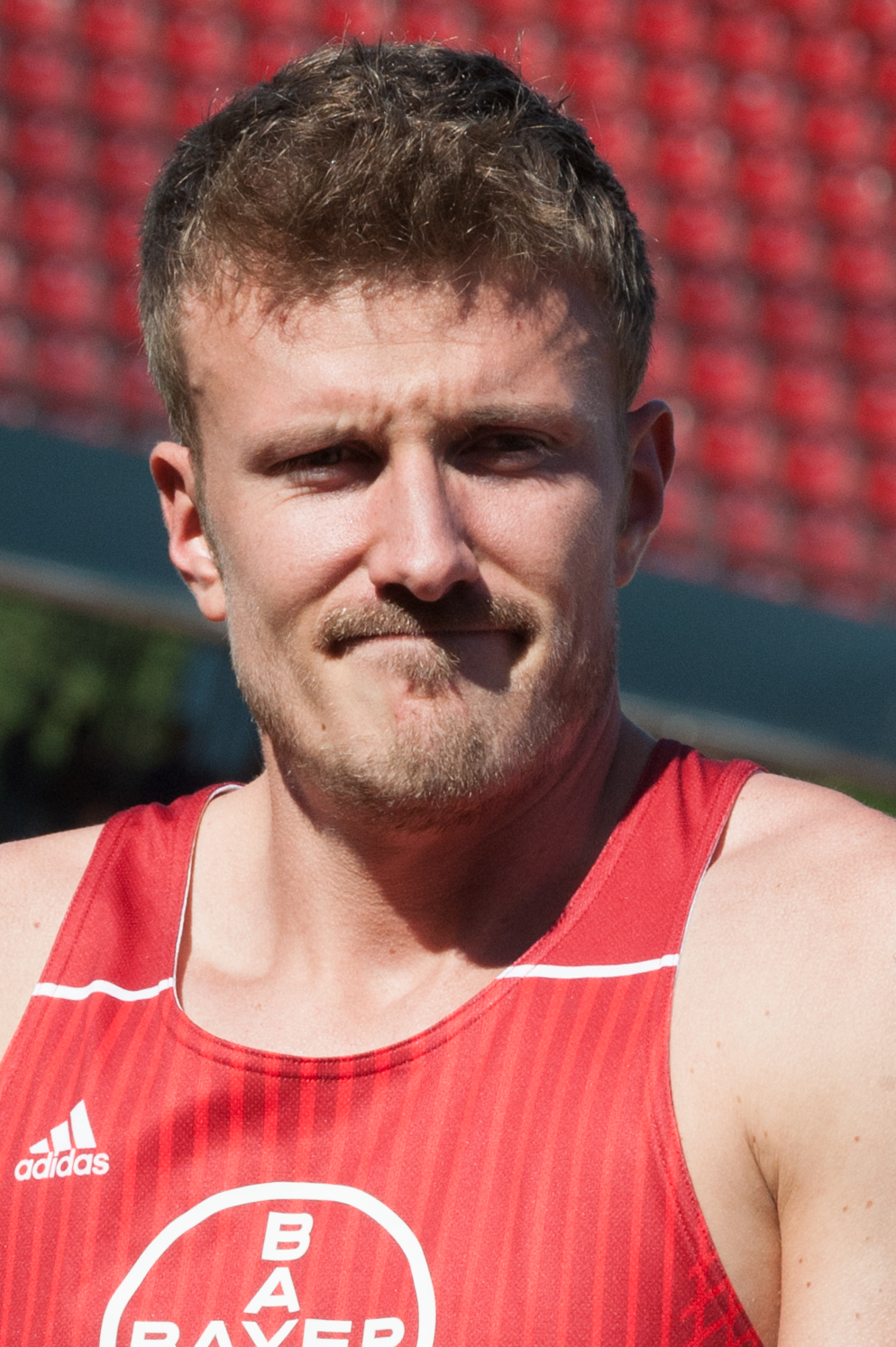
Schembera 2015

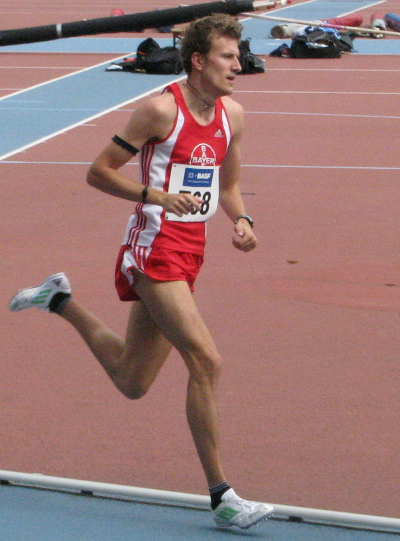
Schembera at Mannheim DLV Competition 2011

Robin Schembera (born 1 October 1988 in Halle (Saale)) is a German middle distance runner who specialises in the 800 metres.

In the age classes, Schembera finished sixth at the 2005 World Youth Championships, won the 2007 European Junior Championships and won a bronze medal at the 2009 European U23 Championships. He competed at the 2009 World Championships without reaching the final.

His personal best is 1:45.63 minutes, achieved in June 2009 in Hengelo.
