= Europahalle =

Sporting arena in Karlsruhe, Germany

Coordinates: 48°59′49″N 8°22′36″E

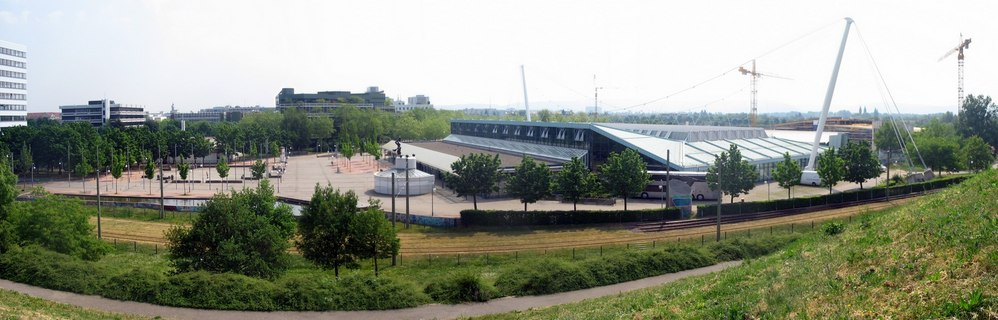
Europahalle in Karlsruhe, Baden-Württemberg, Germany.

Europahalle is an indoor sporting arena located in Karlsruhe, Germany.

The capacity of the arena is 9,000 people.

The venue has featured a number of world record performances in athletics, including a jump of 2.07 m in the high jump by Heike Henkel in 1992, when the Europahalle hosted the German Indoor Championships. This mark remained unbettered indoors for fourteen years and remains one of the best ever performances in the discipline.

After extensive renovation, the arena re-opened in mid-2024. The PS Karlsruhe Lions have been a primary tenant again.

== Events ==
Sports

- European Juggling Convention August 2–10, 2008
- EuroBasket 1985
- EuroBasket 1993
- All-Star Days 1990-1995 of the Basketball Bundesliga
- EuroBasket Women 1998
- Games of the Harlem Globetrotters
- Games of the Germany national basketball team
- Games of the Germany men's national handball team
- Home to the PS Karlsruhe Lions basketball team (until 2020, when the renovation started. The team returned to the arena for the 2024-25 season)

== Address ==
Europahalle Karlsruhe
Hermann-Veit-Straße 7
D-76135 Karlsruhe
