= Maren Orth =

German middle-distance runner

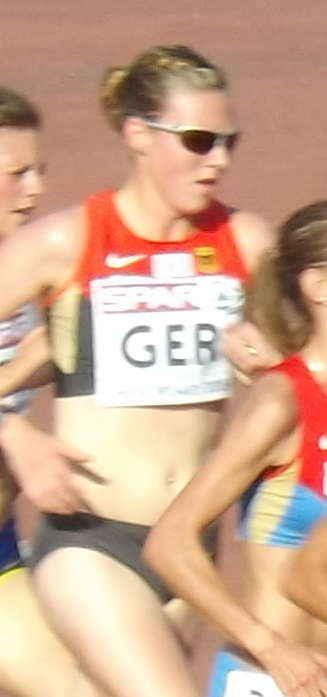
- Maren Kock in 2015

Personal information
- Born: Maren Kock; 22 June 1990 (age 36) Lingen, Germany
- Height: 173 cm (5 ft 8 in)
- Weight: 55 kg (121 lb)
- Spouse: Florian Orth (m. 2017)

Sport
- Country: Germany
- Sport: Athletics
- Event: 1500 metres
Medal record
European Team Championships
Silver medal – second place	2015 Cheboksary	3000 m
Silver medal – second place	2015 Cheboksary	Team

Maren Orth (née Kock; born 22 June 1990) is a German middle-distance runner. She competed in the 1500 metres at the 2016 European Athletics Championships.

In March 2017, she married fellow German distance runner, Florian Orth.
