= Arena Leipzig =

Indoor arena in Leipzig, Germany

Leipzig Arena
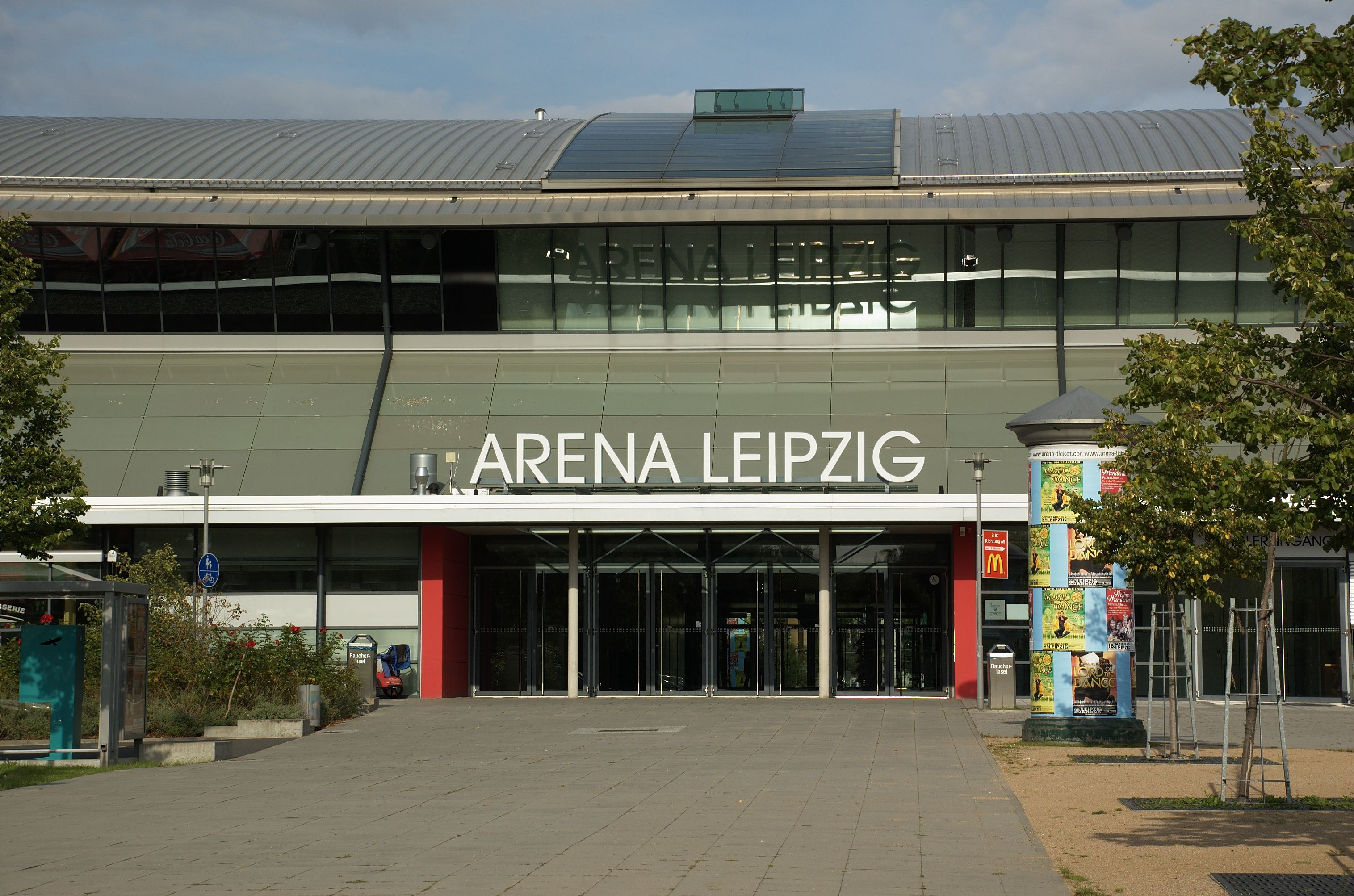
- Interactive map of Leipzig Arena
- Location: Leipzig, Saxony
- Coordinates: 51°20′34″N 12°21′19″E
- Owner: City of Leipzig
- Capacity: 12,000

Construction
- Groundbreaking: 2000
- Built: 2002
- Opened: 11 May 2002
- Cost: € 41,4 million
- Architect: 'asp' architekten Stuttgart

Tenants
- Handball Club Leipzig (2002–); SC DHfK Leipzig Handball (2012–)

Website
- Official Website

The Arena Leipzig is a multipurpose indoor arena located in Leipzig, Germany. The capacity of the arena is 8,000 people for sporting events and up to 12,200 for shows and concerts. It is part of the Sportforum Leipzig in the Zentrum-Nordwest locality, which also contains Red Bull Arena and the Sportmuseum Leipzig.

== Structure ==
The main hall has retractable stands and has depending on its configuration a size from 2,400 to 4,656 square meters. The height of the hall is between 12 and 20 meters. A 200-meter track can be retracted for concerts and shows.

== Sports ==
It is currently the home venue of HC Leipzig, a German handball team.

It hosted the 2015 Men's and Women's Indoor Hockey World Cup, and 2017 World Fencing Championships.

== Other uses ==
The arena is frequently used by national and international artists for concerts and shows. Artists who have performed at this venue include:

A-ha, Alice Cooper, Anastacia, Apocalyptica, Backstreet Boys, Beatsteaks, Björk, Bob Dylan, Britney Spears, Cher, Coldplay, The Cure, David Garrett, Deep Purple, Eric Clapton, George Michael, Gossip, Iron Maiden, James Blunt, Journey, Judas Priest, Justin Timberlake, Kiss, Kylie Minogue, Linkin Park, Lord of the Dance, Loreena McKennitt, Mando Diao, Metallica, Mark Knopfler, Neil Young, NKOTBSB, Pink, Placebo, Queen with Paul Rodgers, Rammstein, Rihanna, Rise Against, Robin Gibb, Roger Waters, Sabaton, Sade, Scorpions, Shakira, Sting, Whitney Houston, ZZ Top and Soy Luna Live.

== See also ==
- List of indoor arenas in Germany
