= Florian Orth =

German middle- and long-distance runner

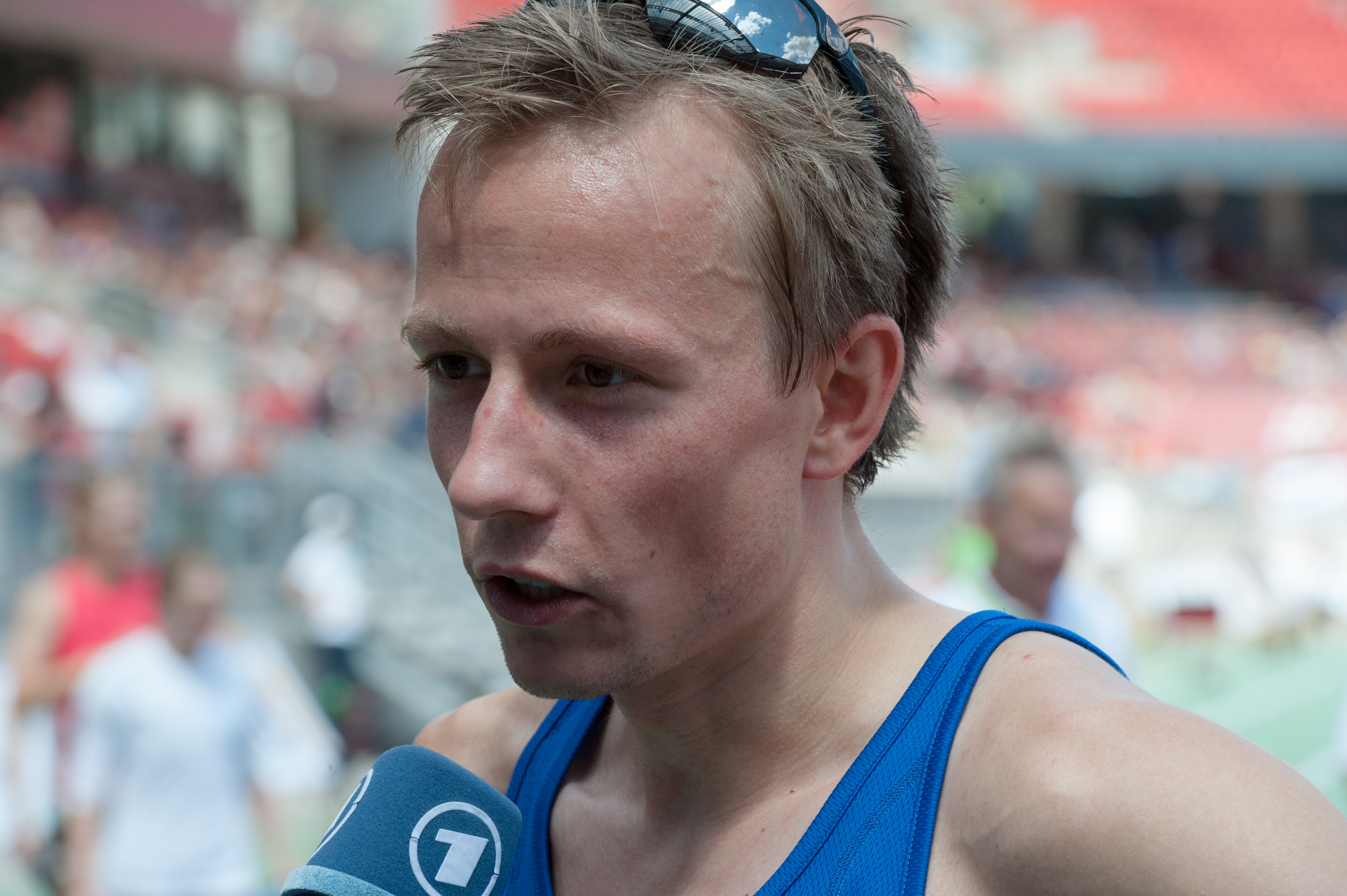
- Orth in 2015

Personal information
- Born: 24 July 1989 Schwalmstadt, West Germany
- Height: 1.81 m (5 ft 11 in)
- Weight: 64 kg (141 lb)

Sport
- Sport: Athletics
- Event(s): 1500 m, 5000 m
- Club: ESV Jahn Treysa (–2009); LG Telis Finanz Regensburg (2010–)

Florian Orth (born 24 July 1989 in Schwalmstadt) is a German athlete specialising in the middle-distance events, primarily the 1500 metres. He represented his country at two outdoor and three indoor European Championships.

In March 2017, he married fellow German distance runner, Maren Kock.

== Competition record ==
Year	Competition	Venue	Position	Event	Notes
Representing Germany
2008	World Junior Championships	Bydgoszcz, Poland	26th (h)	1500 m	3:55.45
2011	European Indoor Championships	Paris, France	10th (h)	1500 m	3:47.47
2012	European Championships	Helsinki, Finland	10th	1500 m	3:58.54
2013	European Indoor Championships	Gothenburg, Sweden	10th (h)	1500 m	3:43.57
2014	European Championships	Zürich, Switzerland	10th	1500 m	3:54.35
2015	European Indoor Championships	Prague, Czech Republic	8th	3000 m	7:51.02
2015	IAAF World Relays	Nassau, Bahamas	5th	Distance medley relay	9:24.37
2016	European Championships	Amsterdam, Netherlands	7th	5000 m	13:45.40
2016	Olympic Games	Rio de Janeiro, Brazil	21st (h)	5000 m	13:28.88
2018	European Championships	Berlin, Germany	17th	5000 m	13:37.46
2019	European Indoor Championships	Glasgow, United Kingdom	11th	3000 m	8:05.09

== Personal bests ==
Outdoor

- 1500 metres – 3:34.54 (Oordegem-Lede 2014)
- 3000 metres – 7:44.65 (Oordegem-Lede 2014)

Indoor

- 1500 metres – 3:39.97 (Karlsruhe 2013)
- 3000 metres – 7:49.48 (Karlsruhe 2015)
