= TV Wattenscheid =

German athletics club

Logo of TV Wattenscheid 01 Leichtathletik

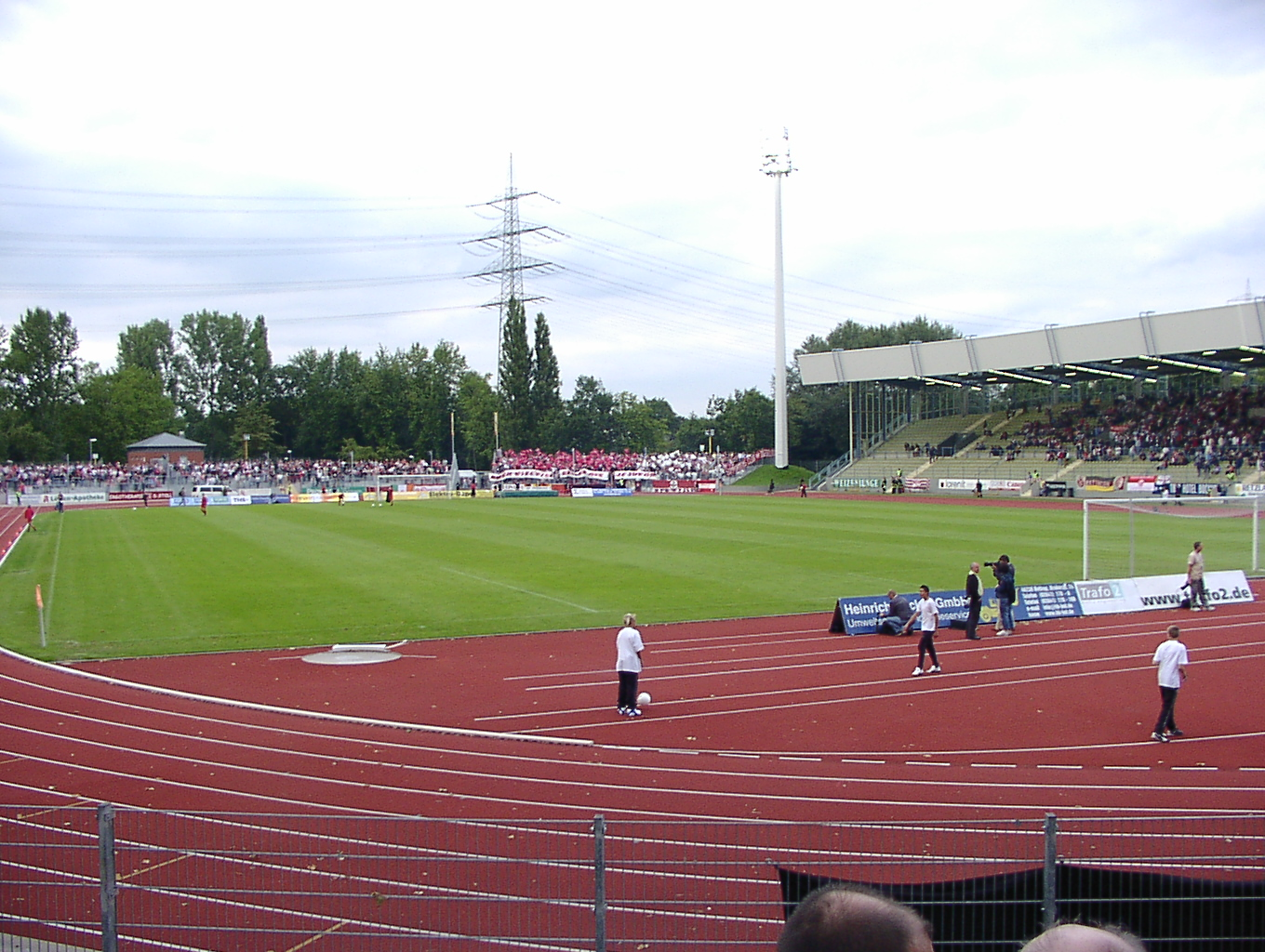
The club is based at Lohrheidestadion

TV Wattenscheid 01 Leichtathletik is a German sports club focused on athletics. Founded in 1971 in Wattenscheid, Bochum in the Western part of Germany, the club's history is linked to that of an older club, Turnverein Wattenscheid 01, a gymnastics club in the city which was formed in 1901. The club's main stadium for events and training is Lohrheidestadion.

The athletics section of the club grew in the mid-1960s and received sponsorship from Klaus Steilmann, a local businessman who was involved with textile manufacturing. Shortly after, the team split away from the main club to form a distinct, athletics-specific club. Among the club's first internationally successful athletes was Sabine Braun, who was twice heptathlon world champion. The current chairman of the club is former sprint athlete Jörg Klocke.

== Athletes ==
The club is among the most successful in Germany and has had many international athletes as members.

- Jan Fitschen, European champion at 10,000 metres
- Melanie Paschke, World sprint relay champion
- Christian Nicolay, European junior champion in javelin
- Raymond Hecht, German javelin throw record holder
- Katja Tengel, Olympic sprinter
- Sina Schielke, European sprint medallist
- Ronny Ostwald, European sprint medallist
- Alexander Kosenkow, European sprint medallist
- Sebastian Ernst, European junior champion in 200 m
- Bastian Swillims, European indoor sprint medallist
- Monika Merl, multiple German 800 m champion
- Willi Mathiszik, World Championships competitor in the 110 m hurdles
- Kerstin Werner, German champion in 1500 m
- Henning Hackelbusch, European Championships competitor in the 400 m hurdles
- Eleni Gebrehiwot, Münster Marathon winner
- Irina Mikitenko, three-time World Marathon Majors winner
- Denise Hinrichs, European indoor shot put medallist
- Denise Krebs, German champion in 1500 m
- Christoph Lohse, World Indoor Championships competitor in the 1500 m
- Michael Möllenbeck, world discus medallist
- Julian Reus, European indoor sprint medallist
- Marion Rothhaar, Multiple German champion, gymnastics
