= Mexico at the 2014 Summer Youth Olympics =

- IOC code: MEX
- NOC: Comité Olímpico Mexicano

in Nanjing
- Competitors: 78 in 20 sports
- Medals Ranked 54th: Gold 0 Silver 5 Bronze 6 Total 11

Summer Youth Olympics appearances (overview)
- 2010; 2014; 2018; 2026

Mexico competed at the 2014 Summer Youth Olympics, in Nanjing, China from 16 August to 28 August 2014.

== Medalists ==
Medal	Name	Sport	Event	Date
Gold	Alejandra Orozco	Diving	Mixed Team	27 Aug
Silver	Rubén Nava	Taekwondo	Boys' 63 kg	19 Aug
Silver	Ana Lilia Durán	Weightlifting	Girls' 63 kg	21 Aug
Silver	Santos Valdés	Shooting	Mixed Teams' 10m Air Rifle	22 Aug
Silver	Valeria Ortuño	Athletics	Girls' 5 kilometre walk	23 Aug
Silver	Rodrigo Diego	Diving	Boys' 3m springboard	24 Aug
Silver	Maria Fernanda Orozco	Athletics	Girls' shot put	24 Aug
Silver	Ricardo Vera	Modern pentathlon	Mixed relay	26 Aug
Bronze	Mitzi Carrillo	Taekwondo	Girls' 49 kg	18 Aug
Bronze	Alejandra Orozco	Diving	Girls' 10m platform	23 Aug
Bronze	Victoria Morales	Canoeing	Girls' C1 sprint	24 Aug
Bronze	Noel Ali Chama	Athletics	Boys' 10 kilometre walk	24 Aug
Bronze	Mexico girls' national football team: Mariana Maldonado; Montserrat Hernández; Dayana Cázares; Alejandra Zaragoza; Kimberly Rodríguez; Ana Karen Saucedo; Kelsey Brann Hernández; Alma López; Vanessa Rodríguez; Elizabeth Anguiano; María Akemi Carreón; Paulina Gutiérrez; Vannya García; Daniela García; María del Carmen Acedo; Alexia Delgado; Dulce Eileen Martínez; Jimena López	Football	Girls' tournament	26 Aug
Bronze	Rodrigo Diego	Diving	Boys' 10m Platform	26 Aug

== Archery ==
Mexico qualified two archers from its performance at the 2013 World Archery Youth Championships.

Individual

Athlete	Event	Ranking round		Round of 32	Round of 16	Quarterfinals	Semifinals	Final / BM	Rank
Athlete	Event	Score	Seed	Opposition Score	Opposition Score	Opposition Score	Opposition Score	Opposition Score	Rank
Luis Tapia	Boys' Individual	681	5	Strajhar (SLO); W 6–0	Gazoz (TUR); L 3–7	Did not advance			9
Alexa Rivera Jimenez	Girls' Individual	604	27	Oleksiuk (UKR); L 0–6	Did not advance				17

Team

Athletes	Event	Ranking round		Round of 32	Round of 16	Quarterfinals	Semifinals	Final / BM	Rank
Athletes	Event	Score	Seed	Opposition Score	Opposition Score	Opposition Score	Opposition Score	Opposition Score	Rank
Rosangel Sainz (CUB); Luis Tapia (MEX)	Mixed Team	1283	18	Freywald (GER); Zolkepeli (MAS); L 3-5	Did not advance				17
Alexa Rivera Jimenez (MEX); Thomas Koenig (FRA)	Mixed Team	1283	17	Laharnar (SLO); Sas (ARG); W 6-2	Mugabilzada (AZE); Muto (JPN); L 4-5	Did not advance			9

== Athletics ==
Mexico qualified 7 athletes to compete in the following events.

Qualification Legend: Q=Final A (medal); qB=Final B (non-medal); qC=Final C (non-medal); qD=Final D (non-medal); qE=Final E (non-medal)

Boys
Track & road events

Athlete	Event	Final	
Athlete	Event	Result	Rank
Noel Ali Chama	10 km walk	42:14.11	3rd place, bronze medalist(s)

Field Events

Athlete	Event	Qualification		Final	
Athlete	Event	Distance	Rank	Distance	Rank
Alejandro Castillo	Shot put	17.10	12 qB	18.08	9

Girls
Track & road events

Athlete	Event	Heats		Final	
Athlete	Event	Result	Rank	Result	Rank
Cecilia Tamayo	100 m	11.88	10 qB	11.83	8
Paola Morán	400 m hurdles	1:00.93 PB	9 qB	59.74 PB	9
Valeria Ortuño	5 km walk	—N/a		23:19.27	2nd place, silver medalist(s)

Field events

Athlete	Event	Qualification		Final	
Athlete	Event	Distance	Rank	Distance	Rank
Ximena Esquivel	High jump	1.74	9 qB	1.73	11
Maria Fernanda Orozco	Shot put	17.21	3 Q	17.55	2nd place, silver medalist(s)

== Badminton ==
Mexico qualified two athletes based on the 2 May 2014 BWF Junior World Rankings.

Singles

Athlete	Event	Group stage				Quarterfinal	Semifinal	Final / BM	Rank
Athlete	Event	Opposition Score	Opposition Score	Opposition Score	Rank	Opposition Score	Opposition Score	Opposition Score	Rank
Luis Ramon Garrido	Boys' Singles	Coelho (BRA); L 0-2	Lu (TPE); L 0-2	Lin (CHN); L 0-2	4	Did not advance			
Sabrina Solis	Girls' Singles	Macias (PER); W 2-0	Doha (EGY); W 2-0	Azurmendi (ESP); L 0-2	2	Did not advance			

Doubles

Athlete	Event	Group stage				Quarterfinal	Semifinal	Final / BM	Rank
Athlete	Event	Opposition Score	Opposition Score	Opposition Score	Rank	Opposition Score	Opposition Score	Opposition Score	Rank
Kristin Kuuba (EST); Luis Ramon Garrido (MEX)	Mixed Doubles	Petrovic (SRB); Liang (SIN); L 0-2	Pham (VIE); Demirbag (TUR); W 2-1	Lu (TPE); Lee (MAS); L 0-2	3	Did not advance			
Sabrina Solis (MEX); Wolfgang Gnedt (AUT)	Mixed Doubles	Cheam (MAS); Ng (HKG); L 0-2	Lin (CHN); Kim (KOR); L 0-2	Citron (FRA); Macias (PER); W 2-1	3	Did not advance			

== Boxing ==
Mexico qualified one boxer based on its performance at the 2014 AIBA Youth World Championships

Boys

Athlete	Event	Preliminaries	Semifinals	Final / RM	Rank
Athlete	Event	Opposition Result	Opposition Result	Opposition Result	Rank
William Segura	-60 kg	Könnyű (HUN); L 0-3	Did not advance	Bout for 5th Place Mustafa (ROU); W w/o	5

== Canoeing ==
Mexico qualified one boat based on its performance at the 2013 World Junior Canoe Sprint and Slalom Championships.

Girls

Athlete	Event	Qualification		Repechage		Quarterfinals	Semifinals	Final / BM	Rank
Athlete	Event	Time	Rank	Time	Rank	Opposition Result	Opposition Result	Opposition Result	Rank
Victoria Morales	C1 slalom	DNF		—N/a		Did not advance			
Victoria Morales	C1 sprint	2:29.258	4 Q	—N/a		Satkova (CZE); W 2:27.150	Luzan (UKR); L 2:26.608	Lavoie-Parent (CAN); W 2:25.429	3rd place, bronze medalist(s)

== Cycling ==
Mexico qualified a boys' and girls' team based on its ranking issued by the UCI.

Team

Athletes	Event	Cross-Country Eliminator		Time Trial			BMX		Cross-Country Race			Road Race			Total Pts	Rank
Athletes	Event	Rank	Points	Time	Rank	Points	Rank	Points	Time	Rank	Points	Time	Rank	Points	Total Pts	Rank
José Alfredo Rodríguez; José Gerardo Ulloa	Boys' Team	8	20	5:12.59	4	50	7	50	54:46	1	100	1:37:42; 1:37:23	36; 16	1	221	5
Brenda Santoyo; Dayana García	Girls' Team	20	0	6:04.08	5	40	21	0	50:01	15	2	1:12:36; 1:27:40	21; 49	0	42	23

Mixed Relay

Athletes	Event	Cross-Country Girls' Race	Cross-Country Boys' Race	Boys' Road Race	Girls' Road Race	Total Time	Rank
Brenda Santoyo; José Alfredo Rodríguez; José Gerardo Ulloa; Dayana García	Mixed Team Relay	3:20	6:08	11:41	18:24	18:24	13

== Diving ==
Mexico qualified four quotas, representing by two athletes, based on its performance at the Nanjing 2014 Diving Qualifying Event.

Athlete	Event	Preliminary		Final	
Athlete	Event	Points	Rank	Points	Rank
Rodrigo Diego	Boys' 3 m springboard	591.85	2	593.65	2nd place, silver medalist(s)
Rodrigo Diego	Boys' 10 m platform	484.00	3	512.75	3rd place, bronze medalist(s)
Alejandra Orozco	Girls' 3 m springboard	431.65	2	398.05	6
Alejandra Orozco	Girls' 10 m platform	403.15	3	430.25	3rd place, bronze medalist(s)
Vivian Barth (SUI); Rodrigo Diego (MEX)	Mixed team	—N/a		275.80	11
Alejandra Orozco (MEX); Daniel Jensen (NOR)	Mixed team	—N/a		379.50	1st place, gold medalist(s)

== Fencing ==
Mexico qualified one athlete at the 2014 Cadet World Championships.

Girls

Athlete	Event	Pool Round	Seed	Round of 16	Quarterfinals	Semifinals	Final / BM	Rank
Athlete	Event	Opposition Score	Seed	Opposition Score	Opposition Score	Opposition Score	Opposition Score	Rank
Julieta Toledo	Sabre	Záhonyi (HUN) Crovari (ITA) Jeon (KOR) Colon (PUR) Boungab (ALG)			Moseyko (RUS); L 14-15	Did not advance		

Mixed Team

Athletes	Event	Round of 16	Quarterfinals	Semifinals / PM	Final / PM	Rank
Athletes	Event	Opposition Score	Opposition Score	Opposition Score	Opposition Score	Rank
Americas 1 Justin Yoo (USA); Sabrina Massialas (USA); Pietro Jose di Martino (ARG); Catherine Nixon (USA); George Haglund (USA); Julieta Isabel Toledo Ames (MEX)	Mixed Team	Bye	Europe 2 L 24–30	Europe 4 L 27–30	Europe 3 L 28–30	8

== Field hockey ==
Mexico qualified a boys' team based on its performance at the 2014 Youth American Championship.

=== Boys' tournament ===
Roster

- José Alan Hernández
- Irving Barush Chávez
- Miguel Ángel Othón Moreno
- José Jesús Montaño
- Daniel Rangel
- Iván Carballo
- Alejandro Méndez
- Agustín Valdez
- Reymundo Lemus

Group Stage

Pos	Team	Pld	W	D	L	GF	GA	GD	Pts	Qualification
1	New Zealand	4	3	1	0	28	12	+16	10	Quarterfinals
2	Pakistan	4	3	1	0	27	12	+15	10	Quarterfinals
3	Mexico	4	1	0	3	11	20	−9	3	Quarterfinals
4	Zambia	4	1	0	3	14	24	−10	3	Quarterfinals
5	Germany	4	1	0	3	10	22	−12	3	

Source: FIH
Rules for classification: 1) points; 2) goal difference; 3) goals scored; 4) head-to-head result.

17 August 2014
21:00

Pakistan	6–2	Mexico
Atiq 3'; Ali 6'; Irshad 8', 26'; Yaqoob 30'; Mahmood 34'	Report	Jacobo 23'; Gomez 35'

Umpires:
Sherif Elamari (EGY)
Donovan Simmons (BER)

18 August 2014
21:00

New Zealand	8–1	Mexico
Newman 3'; Lum 9', 17'; Brydon 11', 21'; Wilcox 12', 29'; Phillips 23'	Report	Martinez 26'

Umpires:
Aziz Adimah (GHA)
Scott Embry (AUS)

19 August 2014
21:00

Mexico	6–2	Zambia
Salas 7', 8', 11'; Gomez 18'; Falcon 31'; Martinez 34'	Report	Lowole 5'; Mpande 35'

Umpires:
Scott Embry (AUS)
Duvaughn Henlon (JAM)

21 August 2014
16:00

Germany	4–2	Mexico
Schneider 9', 21'; Grossmann 28'; Korber 35'	Report	Moreno 12'; Gomez 36'

Umpires:
Rawi Anbananthan (MAS)
Sompop Boonsong (THA)

Quarterfinal

23 August 2014
20:30

Australia	8–1	Mexico
Bird 12', 17'; Weyer 15', 36'; Rasmussen 20', 28', 30'; Warne 26'	Report	Martinez 35'

Umpires:
Donovan Simmons (BER)
Oliver Tarnoczi (AUT)

Crossover

25 August 2014
17:30

New Zealand	9–2	Mexico
Thomas 3', 15', 20', 24'; Lum 6', 7', 12', 29'; Capizzi 16'	Report	Falcon 8'; Martinez 17'

Umpires:
Paul Walker (GBR)
Epeli Tukuca (FIJ)

Seventh and eighth place

27 August 2014
16:00

Zambia	7–4	Mexico
Mpande 4', 30'; Mwansa 11'; Katele 18'; Lowole 23', 24', 36'	Report	Diaz 12', 24'; Martinez 28'; Falcon 36'

Umpires:
Oliver Tarnoczi (AUT)
Scott Embry (AUS)

== Football ==
Mexico qualified in the girls competition.

=== Girls' Tournament ===
Roster

- Mariana Maldonado
- Montserrat Hernández
- Joselyn Cázares
- Alejandra Zaragoza
- Vanessa Rodríguez
- Ana Karen Saucedo
- Kelsey Brann Hernández
- Alma López
- Vanessa Rodríguez
- Elizabeth Anguiano
- María Akemi Carreón
- Paulina Gutiérrez
- Vannya García
- Daniela García
- María del Carmen Acedo
- Alexia Delgado
- Dulce Eileen Martínez
- Jimena López

Group stage

Team	Pld	W	D	L	GF	GA	GD	Pts
China	2	2	0	0	12	0	+12	6
Mexico	2	1	0	1	9	2	+7	3
Namibia	2	0	0	2	0	19	−19	0

14 August 2014
20:45 CST

China	2–0	Mexico
Zhao Yujie 10'; Jin Kun 35'	Report

Wutaishan Stadium, Nanjing
Referee: Morag Pirie (Great Britain)

17 August 2014
20:45

Mexico	9–0	Namibia
Montserrat Hernandez 19', 59'; Daniela Garcia 21', 44'; Alejandra Zaragoza 30', 55', 76'; Dayana Cazares 72'; Maria Acedo 79'	Report

Wutaishan Stadium, Nanjing
Attendance: 4,503
Referee: Marilin Miranda (Paraguay)

Semi-final

23 August 2014
18:00

Venezuela	1–1	Mexico
Argelis Campos 2'	Report	Dayana Cazares 8'
Penalties
Olimar Castillo (penalty scored); Nathalie Pasquel (penalty scored); Sandra Luzardo (penalty missed); Deyna Castellanos (penalty scored); Nayluisa Caceres (penalty scored)	4–3	(penalty scored) Kimberly Rodriguez; (penalty scored) Vanessa Gonzalez; (penalty scored) Marianna Maldonado; (penalty missed) Daniela Garcia; (penalty missed) Montserrat Hernandez

Wutaishan Stadium, Nanjing
Attendance: 4,690
Referee: Morag Pirie (Great Britain)

Bronze medal match

26 August 2014
18:00

Mexico (bronze)	3–1	Slovakia
Andrea Herbrikova 10' (o.g.); Montserrat Hernandez 15'; Daniela Garcia 79'	Report	Diana Anguiano 43' (o.g.)

Wutaishan Stadium, Nanjing
Attendance: 11,678
Referee: Anna-Marie Keighley (New Zealand)

== Golf ==
Mexico qualified one team of two athletes based on the 8 June 2014 IGF Combined World Amateur Golf Rankings.

Individual

Athlete	Event	Round 1		Round 2			Round 3			Total	
Athlete	Event	Score	Rank	Score	Total	Rank	Score	Total	Rank	Score	Rank
Aarón Terrazas	Boys	73 (+1)	19	78 (+6)	151 (+7)	24	69 (-3)	220 (+4)	22	220	22
María Fassi	Girls	72 (par)	10	75 (+3)	147 (+3)	12	75 (+3)	222 (+6)	15	222	15

Team

Athletes	Event	Round 1 (Foursome)		Round 2 (Fourball)			Round 3 (Individual Stroke)				Total	
Athletes	Event	Score	Rank	Score	Total	Rank	Boy	Girl	Total	Rank	Score	Rank
Aarón Terrazas; María Fassi	Mixed	67 (-5)	11	72 (par)	139 (-5)	12	72 (par)	71 (-1)	282 (-6)	11	282	11

== Gymnastics ==
=== Artistic Gymnastics ===
Mexico qualified two athletes based on its performance at the 2014 Junior Pan American Artistic Gymnastics Championships.

Boys

Athlete	Event	Apparatus						Total	Rank
Athlete	Event	F	PH	R	V	PB	HB	Total	Rank
Patricio Razo	Qualification	12.150	5.550	12.275	14.450	11.400	9.625	65.450	38

Girls

Athlete	Event	Apparatus				Total	Rank
Athlete	Event	F	V	UB	BB	Total	Rank
Stephanie Hernández	Qualification	12.450	13.550	12.150	12.950	51.150	8 Q
Stephanie Hernández	All-around	12.450	13.350	12.150	11.400	49.450	15
Stephanie Hernández	Uneven bars					10.433	8
Stephanie Hernández	Balance beam					12.358	7

=== Rhythmic Gymnastics ===
Mexico qualified one athlete based on its performance at the 2014 Junior Pan American Rhythmic Championships.

Individual

Athlete	Event	Qualification						Final					
Athlete	Event	Hoop	Ball	Clubs	Ribbon	Total	Rank	Hoop	Ball	Clubs	Ribbon	Total	Rank
Edna García	Individual	11.200	11.575	12.250	12.850	47.875	14	Did not advance					

=== Trampoline ===
Mexico qualified two athletes based on its performance at the 2014 Junior Pan American Trampoline Championships.

Athlete	Event	Qualification				Final	
Athlete	Event	Routine 1	Routine 2	Total	Rank	Score	Rank
Luis Loria	Boys	45.160	55.435	100.595	2 Q	55.815	4
Karina Cantú	Girls	40.330	48.110	88.440	8 Q	48.345	7

== Modern Pentathlon ==
Mexico qualified one athlete based on its performance at the PANAM YOG Qualifiers and another based on its performance at the 2014 Youth A World Championships.

Athlete	Event	Fencing Ranking Round (épée one touch)		Swimming (200 m freestyle)			Fencing Final Round (épée one touch)			Combined: Shooting/Running (10 m air pistol)/(3000 m)			Total Points	Final Rank
Athlete	Event	Results	Rank	Time	Rank	Points	Results	Rank	Points	Time	Rank	Points	Total Points	Final Rank
Ricardo Vera	Boys' Individual		18	2:30.75	21	248		18	220	14:07.58	14	453	921	18
Martha Derrant	Girls' Individual		15	2:08.63	14	315		12	250	12:44.76	15	536	1101	16
Team 9 Anna Zs Tóth (HUN); Ricardo Vera (MEX)	Mixed Relay		2	2:02.14; 1:03.02; 0:59.12	9	334		2	297	12:10.26	4	570	1201	2nd place, silver medalist(s)
Team 18; Martha Derrant (MEX); Gianluca Micozzi (ITA)	Mixed Relay		5	2:08.33; 1:07.36; 1:00.97	22	315		5	291	12:28.10	11	521	1158	9

== Sailing ==
Mexico qualified two boats; one based on its performance at the Byte CII North American & Caribbean Continental Qualifier and the other based on its performance at the Techno 293 North American & Caribbean Continental Qualifier.

Athlete	Event	Race											Net Points	Final Rank
Athlete	Event	1	2	3	4	5	6	7	8	9	10	M*	Net Points	Final Rank
Paula Pelayo	Girls' Byte CII	7	21	11	14	10	(25)	9	12	Cancelled		109.00	84.00	13
Mariana Aguilar	Girls' Techno 293	(17)	14	17	16	13	14	20	Cancelled			111.00	94.00	18

== Shooting ==
Mexico qualified three athletes at the 2014 American Qualification Tournament.

The three quotas places that Mexico obtained were thanks to José Santos Valdés who finished in the 2nd place at the Men's Air Rifle event, to Lia Borgo Torres who ended 1st at the Women Air Rifle event and Ana Paula Ruiz who won the Women 10m Air Pistol event. All of this events were held al the 2014 ISSF Cup Pistol/Rifle, Fort Benning.

Individual

Athlete	Event	Qualification		Final	
Athlete	Event	Points	Rank	Points	Rank
Santos Valdés	Boys' 10m Air Rifle	614.8	7 Q	81.1	8
Lía Borgo	Girls' 10m Air Rifle	409.0	10	Did not advance	
Alejandra Cervantes	Girls' 10m Air Pistol	372	9	did not advance	

Team

Athletes	Event	Qualification		Round of 16	Quarterfinals	Semifinals	Final / BM	Rank
Athletes	Event	Points	Rank	Opposition Result	Opposition Result	Opposition Result	Opposition Result	Rank
Fernanda Russo (ARG); Santos Valdés (MEX)	Mixed Team 10m Air Rifle		Q		Budde (GER); Deciclia (ARG); W 10 - 7	Sukhorukova (UKR); Lu (TPE); W 10 - 8	Mekhimar (EGY); Péni (HUN); L 2 - 10	2nd place, silver medalist(s)
Niko Alvian (INA); Lía Borgo (MEX)	Mixed Team 10m Air Rifle	822.6	3 Q	Babic (CRO); Laurens (RSA); L 6 - 10	Did not advance			17
Abdul Hadi Abd Malek (MAS); Alejandra Cervantes Rodriguez (MEX)	Mixed teams' 10 m air pistol	735	17	Did not advance				

== Swimming ==
Mexico qualified four swimmers.

Boys

Athlete	Event	Heat		Semifinal		Final	
Athlete	Event	Time	Rank	Time	Rank	Time	Rank
Ricardo Vargas	200 m freestyle	1:54.18	25	—N/a		Did not advance	
Ricardo Vargas	400 m freestyle	3:58.55	19	—N/a		Did not advance	
Ricardo Vargas	800 m freestyle	—N/a				8:10.55	10
Ricardo Vargas	200 m butterfly	2:03.28	10	—N/a		Did not advance	
Luis Jasso Segovia	50 m breaststroke	30.25	32	Did not advance			
Luis Jasso Segovia	100 m breaststroke	1:04.48	23	Did not advance			
Luis Jasso Segovia	200 m breaststroke	2:17.25	10	—N/a		Did not advance	

Girls

Athlete	Event	Heat		Semifinal		Final	
Athlete	Event	Time	Rank	Time	Rank	Time	Rank
Natalia Becerra	200 m freestyle	2:05.24	24	—N/a		Did not advance	
Natalia Becerra	400 m freestyle	4:17.89	15	—N/a		Did not advance	
Natalia Becerra	800 m freestyle	—N/a				8:49.76	10
Natalia Becerra	100 m butterfly	1:04.54	24	Did not advance			
Natalia Becerra	200 m individual medley	2:22.61	20	—N/a		Did not advance	
Allyson Macias	400 m freestyle	4:16.49	11	—N/a		Did not advance	
Allyson Macias	800 m freestyle	—N/a				8:41.53	5

== Taekwondo ==
Mexico qualified four athletes based on its performance at the Taekwondo Qualification Tournament.

Boys

Athlete	Event	Round of 16	Quarterfinals	Semifinals	Final	Rank
Athlete	Event	Opposition Result	Opposition Result	Opposition Result	Opposition Result	Rank
Rubén Nava	−63 kg	Hou (TPE); W 9 - 7	Šućur (SRB); W 7 - 6	Ennadiri (NED); W 11 - 4	Pontes (BRA); L 6 - 7	2nd place, silver medalist(s)

Girls

Athlete	Event	Round of 16	Quarterfinals	Semifinals	Final	Rank
Athlete	Event	Opposition Result	Opposition Result	Opposition Result	Opposition Result	Rank
Brenda Lúa	−44 kg	Bye	Ozbek (AZE); L 0 - 0 (SUP)	Did not advance		5
Mitzi Carrillo	−49 kg	Striner (SWE); W 13 (PTG) - 1	Karšić (BIH); W 20 (PTG) - 1	Huang (TPE); L 1 - 6	Did not advance	3rd place, bronze medalist(s)
Ashley Arana	+63 kg					

== Tennis ==
Mexico qualified one athlete based on the 9 June 2014 ITF World Junior Rankings.

Singles

Athlete	Event	Round of 32	Round of 16	Quarterfinals	Semifinals	Final / BM	Rank
Athlete	Event	Opposition Score	Opposition Score	Opposition Score	Opposition Score	Opposition Score	Rank
Renata Zarazúa	Girls' Singles	Teichmann (SUI); L 0-2; 3-6, 6^{10}-7^{12}	Did not advance				17

Doubles

Athletes	Event	Round of 32	Round of 16	Quarterfinals	Semifinals	Final / BM	Rank
Athletes	Event	Opposition Score	Opposition Score	Opposition Score	Opposition Score	Opposition Score	Rank
Renata Zarazúa (MEX); Sofia Kenin (USA)	Girls' Doubles	—N/a	Ducu / Roșca (ROU); W 2-1; 1–6, 7–5, [10–8]	Bains / Hon (AUS); W 2-0; 7–6^{(7–3)}, 6–1	Kasatkina / Komardina (RUS); L 0-2; 2–6, 4–6	Ostapenko (LAT); Paražinskaitė (LTU); L 0-2; 3–6, 5–7	4
Renata Zarazúa (MEX); Justin Roberts (BAH)	Mixed Doubles	Komardina (RUS); Khachanov (RUS); L 0-2; 4-6, 2-6	Did not advance				17

== Triathlon ==
Mexico qualified two athletes based on its performance at the 2014 American Youth Olympic Games Qualifier.

Individual

Athlete	Event	Swim (750m)	Trans 1	Bike (20 km)	Trans 2	Run (5 km)	Total Time	Rank
Diego López	Boys	09:27	00:43	30:26	00:22	18:23	0:59:21	21
Jessica Romero	Girls	10:07	00:53	34:11	00:29	21:27	1:07:07	28

Relay

Athlete	Event	Total Times per Athlete (Swim 250m, Bike 6.6 km, Run 1.8 km)	Total Group Time	Rank
World Team 1 Jessica Romero Tinoco (MEX); Victor Manuel Herrera de la Hoz (CUB); Sofiya Pryyma (UKR); Philip Horwarth (AUT)	Mixed Relay	23:58; 21:07; 23:07; 20:52	1:29:04	10
America 4 Ana Catalina Barahona (CRC); Diego Lopez Acosta (MEX); Maria Velasquez Soto (COL); Bryan Mendoza Ramos (ESA)	Mixed Relay	24:05; 20:37; 24:39; 21:07	1:30:28	12

== Weightlifting ==
Mexico qualified 2 quotas in the boys' events and 2 quotas in the girls' events based on the team ranking after the 2013 Weightlifting Youth World Championships.

Boys

Athlete	Event	Snatch		Clean & jerk		Total	Rank
Athlete	Event	Result	Rank	Result	Rank	Total	Rank
Oscar Rodríguez	−62 kg	105	6	138	4	243	6
Raúl Manriquez	+85 kg	130	6	175	5	305	5

Girls

Athlete	Event	Snatch		Clean & jerk		Total	Rank
Athlete	Event	Result	Rank	Result	Rank	Total	Rank
Janeth Gómez	−53 kg	75	5	95	4	170	5
Ana Lilia Durán	−63 kg	90	3	120	2	210	2nd place, silver medalist(s)

== Wrestling ==
Mexico qualified two athletes based on its performance at the 2014 Pan American Cadet Championships.

Key:
- VT - Victory by Fall.
- PP - Decision by Points - the loser with technical points.
- PO - Decision by Points - the loser without technical points.

Boys

Athlete	Event	Group stage				Final / RM	Rank
Athlete	Event	Opposition Score	Opposition Score	Opposition Score	Rank	Opposition Score	Rank
Maximiliano García	Freestyle -100kg	Elgizawee (EGY); L 1 - 4 ^{ST}	Hajizada (AZE); L 0 - 4 ^{ST}	Filho (BRA); L 0 - 3 ^{PO}	4 Q	Pratt (AUS)	
Emilio Pérez	Greco-Roman -42kg	Ri (PRK); L 0 – 4 ^{ST}	Isoev (TJK); L 0 – 4 ^{VT}	—N/a	3 Q	5th Place Match Belghelam (ALG); W 4 - 0 ^{VT}	5
