= Athletics at the 2014 Summer Youth Olympics – Girls' 5 kilometre walk =

Athletics – Girls' 5 kilometre walk at the II Summer Youth Olympic Games
- Venue: Nanjing Olympic Sports Centre
- Date: August 23
- Competitors: 15 from 15 nations

Medalists
1st place, gold medalist(s)		Ma Zhenxia	China
2nd place, silver medalist(s)		Valeria Ortuño	Mexico
3rd place, bronze medalist(s)		Noemi Stella	Italy

The girls' 5 kilometre walk event at the 2014 Summer Youth Olympics was held on 23 August 2014 in Nanjing Olympic Sports Center.

== Schedule ==
Date	Time	Round
23 August 2014	19:00	Final

== Results ==
=== Final ===
Rank	Athlete	Result	Notes
1st place, gold medalist(s)	Ma Zhenxia (CHN)	22:22.08	SB
2nd place, silver medalist(s)	Valeria Ortuño (MEX)	23:19.27	
3rd place, bronze medalist(s)	Noemi Stella (ITA)	23:38.10	
4	Sayori Matsumoto (JPN)	23:54.71	
5	Athanasía Vaítsi (GRE)	24:22.21	PB
6	Irene Vázquez (ESP)	24:22.76	
7	Karla Jaramillo (ECU)	24:33.05	
8	kim Chaehyun (KOR)	24:36.53	PB
9	Olga Niedzialek (POL)	24:39.53	
10	Axelle Ham (FRA)	25:01.26	
11	Neena Kamba Thankan (IND)	25:02.19	
12	Liu Yu-Chi (TPE)	25:14.62	PB
13	Nicoleta Lungu (ROU)	25:49.03	PB
14	Beza Berhanu (ETH)	26:21.58	
15	Natallia Malchanava (BLR)	26:32.83	

Intermediate times:

1000m	4:33.70	Valeria Ortuño (MEX)
2000m	9:09.45	Ma Zhenxia (CHN)
3000m	13:38.74	Ma Zhenxia (CHN)
4000m	18:02.86	Ma Zhenxia (CHN)
