= 2016 IAAF World U20 Championships – Women's 10,000 metres walk =

The women's 10,000 metres race walk event at the 2016 IAAF World U20 Championships was held at Poland's Zdzisław Krzyszkowiak Stadium on 19 July.

== Medalists ==
Gold	Ma Zhenxia; China
Silver	Noemi Stella; Italy
Bronze	Yehualeye Beletew; Ethiopia

== Records ==
Standing records prior to the 2016 IAAF World U20 Championships in Athletics
World Junior Record	Anežka Drahotová (CZE)	42:47.25	Eugene, United States	23 July 2014
Championship Record	Anežka Drahotová (CZE)	42:47.25	Eugene, United States	23 July 2014
World Junior Leading	Noemi Stella (ITA)	46:00.67	Brixen, Italy	11 June 2016

== Results ==
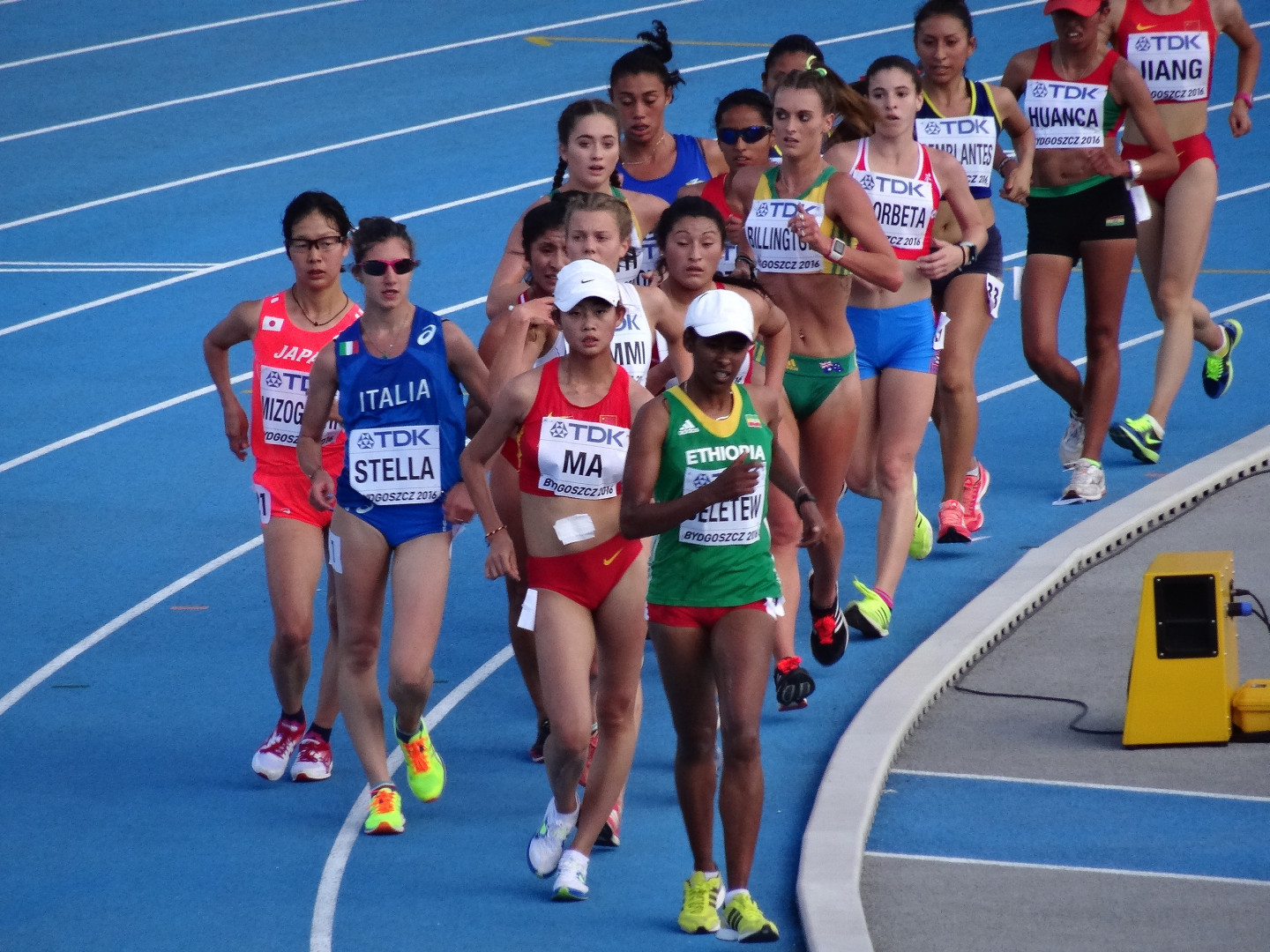
The race underway

Rank	Name	Nationality	Time	Note	Penalties
1st place, gold medalist(s)	Ma Zhenxia	China	45:18.45	WU20L	
2nd place, silver medalist(s)	Noemi Stella	Italy	45:23.85	SB	
3rd place, bronze medalist(s)	Yehualeye Beletew	Ethiopia	45:33.69	AU20R	~>
4	Valeria Ortuño	Mexico	45:44.33	AU20R	
5	Jiang Shanshan	China	45:51.27	PB	
6	Taika Nummi	Finland	46:04.74		
7	Karla Jaramillo	Ecuador	46:15.24		~
8	Yukiho Mizoguchi	Japan	46:19.49		
9	Rachelle de Orbeta	Puerto Rico	46:22.71	NU20R	~
10	Evelyn Inga	Peru	46:24.71	NU20R	~
11	Teresa Zurek	Germany	46:34.94	NU20R	
12	Leyde Guerra	Peru	46:37.03	PB	
13	Clara Smith	Australia	46:59.96		
14	Emilia Lehmeyer	Germany	47:03.11		>
15	Lina Bolívar	Colombia	47:03.71		
16	Mishell Semblantes	Ecuador	47:08.16	PB	
17	Olga Niedziałek	Poland	47:45.65	PB	~
18	Giada Francesca Ciabini	Italy	48:27.41		
19	Tayla Paige Billington	Australia	48:32.33		>
20	Zofia Kreja	Poland	48:32.80		>
21	María Montoya	Colombia	48:48.99		>~~
22	Valeryia Komel	Belarus	48:49.60		
23	Arely Morales	Guatemala	49:01.24		>
24	Irene Montejo	Spain	49:25.85		
25	Anali Cisneros	United States	49:31.88		
26	Odeth Huanca	Bolivia	49:41.85		>
27	Enni Nurmi	Finland	49:53.55		
28	Meaghan Podlaski	United States	50:21.22		
29	Carolina Costa	Portugal	50:25.05		
30	Yuliia Balym	Ukraine	50:30.54		
31	Anastasia Sanzana	Chile	50:32.61	NU20R	
32	Yeter Arslan	Turkey	50:32.61		>
33	Meral Kurt	Turkey	50:37.78	PB	
34	Kristina Povorozniuk	Ukraine	52:38.92		
35	Maria José Cortes	Nicaragua	52:52.60	NU20R	
