= 2013 World Youth Championships in Athletics – Girls' 5000 metres walk =

Girls' 5000 metres walk at the 2013 World Youth Championships in Athletics
- Venue: RSC Olimpiyskiy
- Dates: 13 July
- Competitors: 31
- Winning time: 22:13.91 WYL

Medalists
gold medal	Olga Shargina	Russia
silver medal	Momoko Mizota	Japan
bronze medal	Noemi Stella	Italy

The girls' 5000 metres walk at the 2013 World Youth Championships in Athletics was held on 13 July.

== Medalists ==
Gold	Silver	Bronze
Olga Shargina; Russia	Momoko Mizota; Japan	Noemi Stella; Italy

== Records ==
Prior to the competition, the following records were as follows.

World Youth Best	Tatyana Kalmykova (RUS)	20:28.05	Ostrava, Czech Republic	12 July 2007
Championship Record	Tatyana Kalmykova (RUS)	20:28.05	Ostrava, Czech Republic	12 July 2007
World Youth Leading	Olga Shargina (RUS)	22:27.0	Cheboksary, Russia	8 June 2013

== Final ==
Rank	Name	Nationality	Result	Notes
1st place, gold medalist(s)	Olga Shargina	Russia	22:13.91	WYL
2nd place, silver medalist(s)	Momoko Mizota	Japan	22:42.77	PB
3rd place, bronze medalist(s)	Noemi Stella	Italy	22:48.95	
4	Zhao Wenli	China	22:58.56	PB
5	Klavdiya Afanasyeva	Russia	23:33.24	
6	Xiao Xianghua	China	23:44.33	PB
7	María Pérez	Spain	23:48.11	
8	Katarzyna Zdziebło	Poland	23:50.37	
9	Lidia Sánchez-Puebla	Spain	24:24.59	
10	Henrika Parviainen	Finland	24:32.42	PB
11	Karla Jaramillo	Ecuador	24:34.18	
12	Carmen Molnar	Romania	24:38.61	PB
13	Jessica Tapia	Mexico	24:39.49	
14	Neena Kamba Thankan	India	24:42.18	PB
15	Daniela Pastrana	Colombia	24:43.12	PB
16	Živilė Vaiciukevičiūtė	Lithuania	24:47.72	
17	Eleonora Dominici	Italy	24:52.98	
18	Daniela Dorado	Colombia	25:06.03	
19	Riheb Mansouri	Tunisia	25:06.46	PB
20	Elena Goh Ling Yin	Malaysia	25:10.36	
21	Hanna Suslyk	Ukraine	25:19.03	
22	Ivanna Danyluk	Ukraine	25:20.53	
23	Radoslava Piliarová	Slovakia	26:12.70	
24	Lena Tomas	Sweden	26:23.21	PB
25	Milica Kostić	Serbia	26:38.04	PB
26	Nikoleta Abbatantuono	Slovakia	26:47.50	PB
27	Rita Récsei	Hungary	26:49.95	
28	Ivana Renić	Croatia	27:22.32	
	Lena Ungerböck	Austria	DQ	
	Chahinez Nasri	Tunisia	DQ	
	Mildred Raya	Mexico	DNF	
