= Athletics at the 2022 Asian Games – Women's 20 kilometres walk =

Women's 20 kilometres walk at the 2022 Asian Games
- Venue: Qiantang River Green Belt
- Date: 29 September 2023
- Competitors: 8 from 6 nations

Medalists
gold medal	Yang Jiayu	China
silver medal	Ma Zhenxia	China
bronze medal	Nanako Fujii	Japan

The women's 20 kilometres walk competition at the 2022 Asian Games took place on 29 September 2023 at the Qiantang River Green Belt.

== Schedule ==
All times are China Standard Time (UTC+08:00)

Date	Time	Event
Friday, 29 September 2023	07:10	Final

== Records ==
Prior to this competition, the existing world, Asian and Games records were as follows.

World Record	Yang Jiayu (CHN)	1:23:49	Huangshan, China	20 March 2021
Asian Record	Yang Jiayu (CHN)	1:23:49	Huangshan, China	20 March 2021
Games Record	Yang Jiayu (CHN); Qieyang Shijie (CHN)	1:29:15	Jakarta, Indonesia; Jakarta, Indonesia	29 August 2018; 29 August 2018

== Results ==
Rank	Athlete	Time	Notes
1st place, gold medalist(s)	Yang Jiayu (CHN)	1:30:03	
2nd place, silver medalist(s)	Ma Zhenxia (CHN)	1:30:04	
3rd place, bronze medalist(s)	Nanako Fujii (JPN)	1:33:49	
4	Yukiko Umeno (JPN)	1:39:44	
5	Priyanka Goswami (IND)	1:43:07	
6	Ching Siu Nga (HKG)	1:43:27	
7	Galina Yakusheva (KAZ)	1:46:23	
8	Violine Intan Puspita (INA)	1:53:14	
