= 2016 German Indoor Athletics Championships =

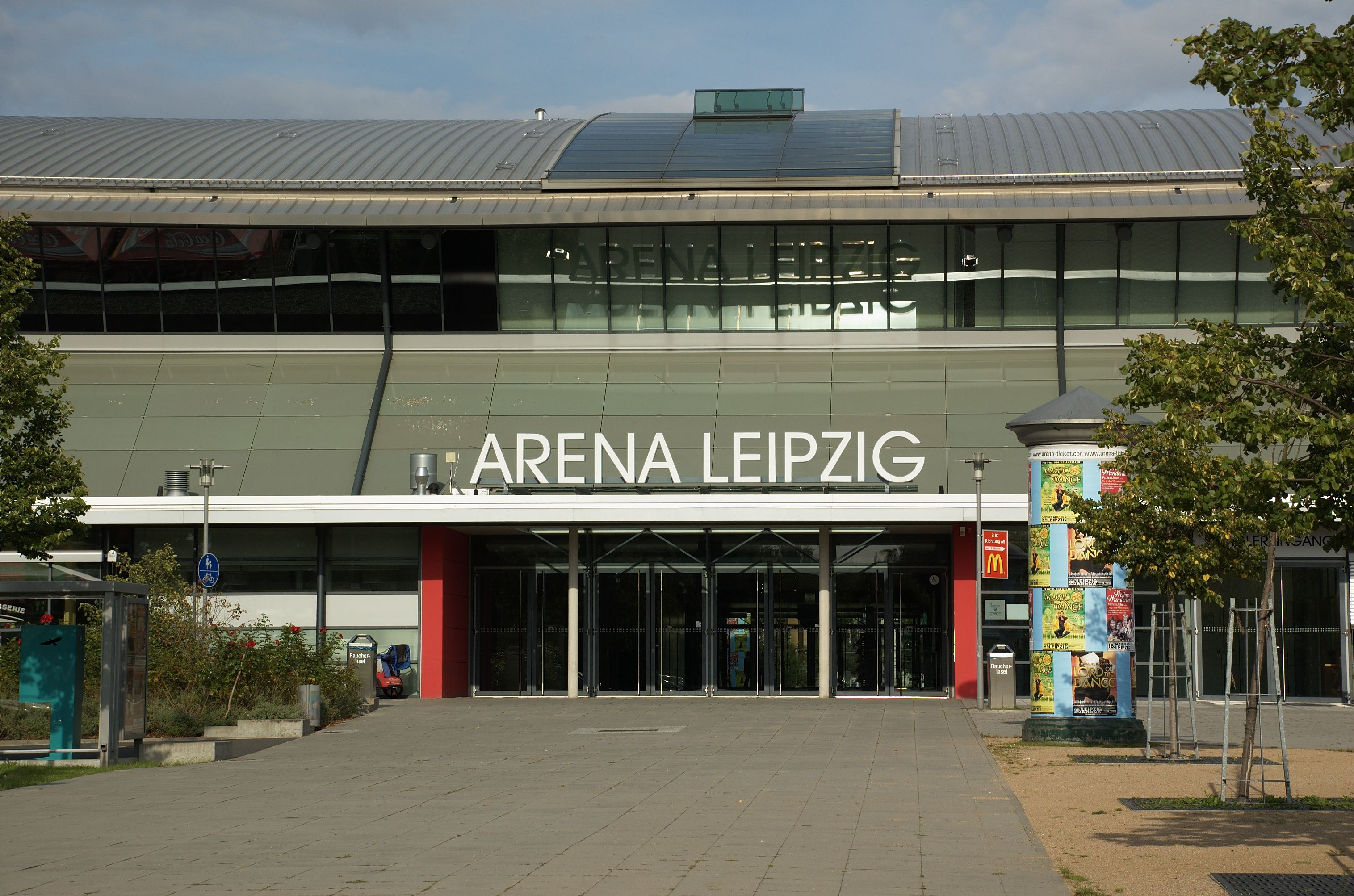
- The host stadium
- Dates: 27–28 February
- Host city: Leipzig
- Venue: Arena Leipzig
- Events: 24+6

The 2016 German Indoor Athletics Championships (German: Deutsche Leichtathletik-Hallenmeisterschaften 2016) was the 63rd edition of the national championship in indoor track and field for Germany. It was held on 27–28 February at the Arena Leipzig in Leipzig – the sixth time the venue had hosted the championships. Local authorities in Leipzig supported the event with funding of 50,000 euros. A total of 24 events, 12 for men and 13 for women, were contested plus six further events were held separately. It was to serve as preparation for the 2016 IAAF World Indoor Championships.

Several national championship events were staged elsewhere: 3 × 800 m and 3 × 1000 m relays were held on 21 February at the Helmut-Körnig-Hallen in Dortmund alongside the German Indoor Youth Athletics Championships, while racewalking events were hosted at the Leichtathletikhalle Erfurt in Erfurt on 14 February alongside the German Indoor Masters Athletics Championships. Indoor combined events were held at the Leichtathletik-Halle in Hamburg on 30 and 31 January.

== Results ==
=== Men ===
Event	Gold		Silver		Bronze	
60 metres	Julian Reus; TV Wattenscheid	6.52 s NR	Christian Blum; TV Wattenscheid	6.60 s	Robert Hering; SC DHfK Leipzig	6.69 s
200 metres	Julian Reus; TV Wattenscheid	20.55 s	Robert Hering; SC DHfK Leipzig	20.88 s	Robin Erewa; TV Wattenscheid	21.12 s
400 metres	Eric Krüger; SC Magdeburg	47.11 s	Marc Koch; LG Nord Berlin	47.30 s	Robert Hind; LG LAZ Saar 05 Saarbrücken	47.76 s
800 metres	Jan Riedel; Dresdner SC	1:49.86 min	Sören Ludolph; LG Braunschweig	1:50.27 min	Christoph Kessler; LG Region Karlsruhe	1:50.76 min
1500 metres	Florian Orth; LG Telis Finanz Regensburg	3:51.20 min	Marius Probst; TV Wattenscheid	3:51.54 min	Stefan Hettich; TSV Gomaringen	3:51.60 min
3000 metres	Florian Orth; LG Telis Finanz Regensburg	8:07.39 min	Timo Benitz; LG Nordschwarzwald	8:08.32 min	Clemens Bleistein; LG Stadtwerke München	8:09.10 min
5000 m walk	Christopher Linke; SC Potsdam	18:44.32 min	Nils Brembach; SC Potsdam	18:46.77 min	Hagen Pohle; SC Potsdam	18:54.32 min
60 m hurdles	Erik Balnuweit; SC DHfK Leipzig	7.61 s	Alexander John; SC DHfK Leipzig	7.82 s	Martin Vogel; LAC Erdgas Chemnitz	7.67 s
4 × 200 m relay	TSV Bayer 04 Leverkusen; Aleixo-Platini Menga; Kai Köllmann; Lukas Blechschmidt; Nico Menzel	1:24.72 min	LG LAZ Saar 05 Saarbrücken; Robert Hind; Marcel Kirstges; Ismail-Jean Condé; Rouven Christ	1:24.88 min	MTG Mannheim; Florian Hochdörffer; Dennis Herdt; David Gollnow; Yannick Hornung	1:25.89 min
3 × 1000 m relay	LG Braunschweig; Viktor Kuk; Andreas Lange; Sören Ludolph	7:17.95 min	LG Region Karlsruhe; Holger Körner; Felix Wammetsberger; Christoph Kessler	7:19.47 min	LSC Höchstadt/Aisch; Niklas Bühner; Bastian Grau; Martin Grau	7:20.84 min
High jump	Mateusz Przybylko; TSV Bayer 04 Leverkusen	2.29 m	Eike Onnen; Hannover 96	2.26 m	Tim Schenker; LAC Erdgas Chemnitz	2.10 m
Pole vault	Carlo Paech; TSV Bayer 04 Leverkusen	5.60 m	Daniel Clemens; LAZ Zweibrücken	5.50 m	Florian Gaul; VfL Sindelfingen	5.50 m
Long jump	Alyn Camara; TSV Bayer 04 Leverkusen	7.82 m	Julian Howard; LG Region Karlsruhe	7.76 m	Marcel Kirstges; LG LAZ Saar 05 Saarbrücken	7.55 m
Triple jump	Max Heß; LAC Erdgas Chemnitz	17.00 m	Martin Seiler; ABC Ludwigshafen	15.85 m	Marcel Kornhardt; ASV Erfurt	15.79 m
Shot put	Tobias Dahm; VfL Sindelfingen	20.00 m	Robert Dippl; TSV Wasserburg	18.74 m	Bodo Göder; SR Yburg Steinbach	18.71 m
Heptathlon	Kai Kazmirek; LG Rhein-Wied	6071 pts	Mathias Brugger; SSV Ulm 1846	5894 pts	Tim Nowak; SSV Ulm 1846	5805 pts

=== Women ===
Event	Gold		Silver		Bronze	
60 metres	Tatjana Pinto; LC Paderborn	7.07 s	Rebekka Haase; LV 90 Erzgebirge	7.20 s	Nadine Gonska; MTG Mannheim	7.29 s
200 metres	Rebekka Haase; LV 90 Erzgebirge	23.10 s	Lisa Mayer; LG Langgöns-Oberkleen	23.30 s	Inna Weit; Allgemeiner Rather Turnverein	23.64 s
400 metres	Lara Hoffmann; LT DSHS Köln	53.41 s	Friederike Möhlenkamp; LT DSHS Köln	53.45 s	Frederike Hogrebe; TSV Bayer 04 Leverkusen	54.32 s
800 metres	Christina Hering; LG Stadtwerke München	2:02.48 min	Carolin Walter; TSV Bayer 04 Leverkusen	2:05.47 min	Tanja Spill; LAV Bayer Uerdingen/Dormagen	2:05.59 min
1500 metres	Maren Kock; LG Telis Finanz Regensburg	4:36.59 min	Lena Klaassen; TSV Bayer 04 Leverkusen	4:37.32 min	Thea Heim; LG Telis Finanz Regensburg	4:16.61 min
3000 metres	Konstanze Klosterhalfen; TSV Bayer 04 Leverkusen	8:56.36 min AJR	Alina Reh; SSV Ulm 1846	9:00.58 min	Jana Sussmann; LT Haspa Hamburg-Marathon	9:11.07 min
3000 m walk	Teresa Zurek; SC Potsdam	13:46.95 min	Nicole Best; TV Groß-Gerau	14:15.80 min	Lea Dederichs; Allgemeiner Rather Turnverein	14:16.45 min
60 m hurdles	Cindy Roleder; SC DHfK Leipzig	7.88 s	Nadine Hildebrand; VfL Sindelfingen	8.01 s	Ricarda Lobe; MTG Mannheim	8.10 s
4 × 200 m relay	TV Wattenscheid; Esther Cremer; Christina Haack; Monika Zapalska; Pamela Dutkiewicz	1:35.31 min	LC Paderborn; Tatjana Pinto; Janina Kölsch; Ina Thimm; Josefina Elsler	1:35.97 min	LT DSHS Köln; Friederike Möhlenkamp; Lara Hoffmann; Christine Salterberg; Lena Naumann	1:36.62 min
3 × 800 m relay	TSV Bayer 04 Leverkusen I Rebekka Ackers; Lena Klaassen; Carolin Walter	6:22.59 min	TV Wattenscheid; Janine Lins; Christina Zwirner; Denise Krebs	6:32.83 min	TSV Bayer 04 Leverkusen II; Frederike Hogrebe; Lena Menzel; Fiona Kierdorf	6:35.79 min
High jump	Marie-Laurence Jungfleisch; VfB Stuttgart	1.92 m	Katarina Mögenburg; TSV Bayer 04 Leverkusen	1.86 m	Ariane Friedrich; LG Eintracht Frankfurt	1.86 m
Pole vault	Silke Spiegelburg; TSV Bayer 04 Leverkusen	4.56 m	Martina Strutz; Schweriner SC	4.51 m	Annika Roloff; MTV Holzminden	4.46 m
Long jump	Alexandra Wester; ASV Köln	6.75 m	Maryse Luzolo; KLV Königstein	6.51 m	Melanie Bauschke; LAC Olympia 88 Berlin	6.42 m
Triple jump	Jenny Elbe; Dresdner SC	14.15 m	Kristin Gierisch; LAC Erdgas Chemnitz	13.97 m	Neele Eckhardt; LG Göttingen	13.76 m
Shot put	Lena Urbaniak; LG Filstal	18.32 m	Anna Rüh; SC Magdeburg	17.68 m	Josephine Terlecki; SV Halle	17.14 m
Pentathlon	Celina Leffler; SSC Koblenz-Karthause	4347 pts	Anna Maiwald; TSV Bayer 04 Leverkusen	4208 pts	Lea Menzel; TV Neu-Isenburg	3958 pts
