= Ma Zhenxia =

Chinese racewalker (born 1998)

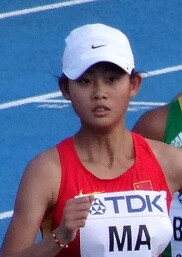
- Ma Zhenxia (in 2016, in front, wearing red)

Personal information
- Born: 1 August 1998 (age 27)

Sport
- Country: China
- Event: Racewalking
Medal record
Women's racewalking
Representing China
Asian Games
Silver medal – second place	2022 Hangzhou	20 km walk
Summer Youth Olympics
Gold medal – first place	2014 Nanjing	5 km walk
World Youth Championships in Athletics
Gold medal – first place	2015 Cali	5 km walk
Asian Youth Athletics Championships
Gold medal – first place	2015 Doha	5 km walk
IAAF World U20 Championships
Gold medal – first place	2016 Bydgoszcz	10 km walk

Ma Zhenxia (born 1 August 1998) is a Chinese racewalker. She won the silver medal in the women's 20 kilometre walk at the 2022 Asian Games held in Hangzhou, China. She won the gold medal in the girls' 5 kilometre walk at the 2014 Summer Youth Olympics held in Nanjing, China.

In 2015, she won the gold medal in the women's 5000 metres walk at the Asian Youth Athletics Championships held in Doha, Qatar. In the same year, she also won the gold medal in the women's 5000 metres walk at the 2015 World Youth Championships in Athletics held in Cali, Colombia.

She won the junior women's race at the 2016 IAAF World Race Walking Team Championships held in Rome, Italy. In the same year, she also won the gold medal in the women's 10,000 metres walk at the 2016 IAAF World U20 Championships held in Bydgoszcz, Poland.

She won the women's event at the 2019 Asian Race Walking Championships.

She competed in the women's 20 kilometres walk at the 2022 World Athletics Championships held in Eugene, Oregon, United States.
