= Athletics at the 2018 Asian Games – Women's 20 kilometres walk =

Women's 20 kilometres walk at the 2018 Asian Games
- Venue: Gelora Bung Karno Stadium
- Date: 29 August 2018
- Competitors: 11 from 7 nations

Medalists
gold medal	Yang Jiayu	China
silver medal	Qieyang Shijie	China
bronze medal	Kumiko Okada	Japan

The women's 20 kilometres walk competition at the 2018 Asian Games took place on 29 August 2018 at the Gelora Bung Karno Stadium.

== Schedule ==
All times are Western Indonesia Time (UTC+07:00)

Date	Time	Event
Wednesday, 29 August 2018	06:10	Final

== Records ==
Prior to this competition, the existing world, Asian and Games records were as follows.

World Record	Liu Hong (CHN)	1:25:02	A Coruña, Spain	6 June 2015
Asian Record	Liu Hong (CHN)	1:25:02	A Coruña, Spain	6 June 2015
Games Record	Liu Hong (CHN)	1:30:06	Guangzhou, China	23 November 2010

== Results ==
Legend

- DNF — Did not finish
- DSQ — Disqualified

Rank	Athlete	Time	Notes
1st place, gold medalist(s)	Yang Jiayu (CHN)	1:29:15	GR
2nd place, silver medalist(s)	Qieyang Shijie (CHN)	1:29:15	=GR
3rd place, bronze medalist(s)	Kumiko Okada (JPN)	1:34:02	
4	Khushbir Kaur (IND)	1:35:24	
5	Jeon Yeong-eun (KOR)	1:37:31	
6	Ching Siu Nga (HKG)	1:39:51	
7	Lee Jeong-eun (KOR)	1:40:14	
8	Diana Aidossova (KAZ)	1:42:32	
9	Ayman Ratova (KAZ)	1:42:35	
—	Ranwa Balilli (PLE)	DNF	
—	Soumya Baby (IND)	DSQ	
