= Nanako Fujii =

Japanese race walker (born 1999)

Personal information
- Nationality: Japanese
- Born: 7 May 1999 (age 27) Nakagawa, Fukuoka Prefecture

Sport
- Sport: Athletics
- Event: Race walking
Medal record
Women's racewalking
Representing Japan
World Championships
Bronze medal – third place	2025 Tokyo	20 km walk
Asian Games
Bronze medal – third place	2022 Hangzhou	20 km walk

Nanako Fujii (藤井 菜々子, Fujii Nanako; born 7 May 1999) is a Japanese racewalking athlete. Representing Japan at the 2019 World Athletics Championships, she placed seventh in the women's 20 kilometres walk. At the 2025 World Athletics Championships, she won a bronze medal in the women's 20 kilometres walk.
