= 2019 European Athletics U23 Championships – Women's 20 kilometres walk =

The women's 20 kilometres walk event at the 2019 European Athletics U23 Championships was held in Gävle, Sweden on 14 July.

== Results ==
Rank	Name	Nationality	Time	Notes	Penalties
1st place, gold medalist(s)	Ayşe Tekdal	Turkey	1:34:47		
2nd place, silver medalist(s)	Olga Niedziałek	Poland	1:35:54		~~
3rd place, bronze medalist(s)	Yana Smerdova	Authorised Neutral Athletes	1:35:58	SB	
4	Marina Peña	Spain	1:37:12		
5	Antia Chamosa	Spain	1:37:34		
6	Lidia Barcella	Italy	1:38:05		>
7	Sofia Alikanioti	Greece	1:39:11	PB	
8	Teresa Zurek	Germany	1:39:41		~
9	Irene Montejo	Spain	1:40:55		>
10	Eloise Terrec	France	1:41:19		
11	Carolina Costa	Portugal	1:41:41		
12	Oksana Kulahina	Ukraine	1:41:46		>
13	Efstathia Kourkoutsaki	Greece	1:42:18		>
14	Enni Nurmi	Finland	1:42:29		
15	Anniina Kivimäki	Finland	1:42:52	PB	
16	Yuliya Balym	Ukraine	1:47:27		
17	Yana Faryna	Ukraine	1:47:54		>
18	Ema Hačundová	Slovakia	1:48:32		>
19	Andreia Sousa	Portugal	1:50:18		
	Clemence Beretta	France	DQ		~~~~
	Maria Bernardo	Portugal	DQ		>>>>

Penalties:
~ Lost contact
> Bent knee
