= 2019 German Indoor Athletics Championships =

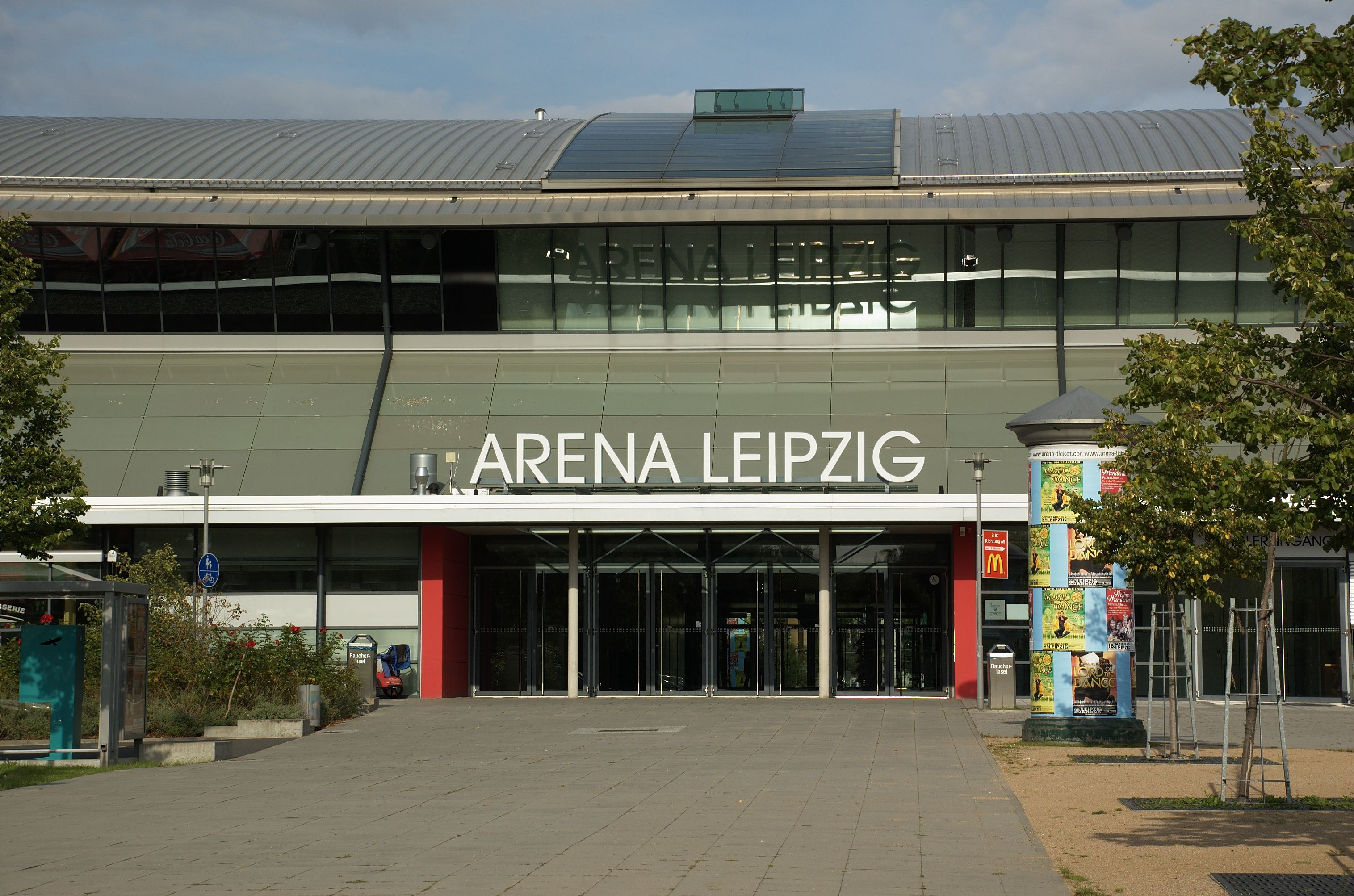
- The host stadium
- Dates: 16–17 February
- Host city: Leipzig
- Venue: Arena Leipzig
- Events: 24+6

The 2019 German Indoor Athletics Championships (German: Deutsche Leichtathletik-Hallenmeisterschaften 2019) was the 66th edition of the national championship in indoor track and field for Germany. It was held on 16–17 February at the Arena Leipzig in Leipzig. A total of 24 events, 12 for men and 12 for women, were contested. It served as preparation for the 2019 European Athletics Indoor Championships.

Several national championship events were staged elsewhere: combined events were held on 26–27 January in the Sporthalle Brandberge in Halle, the relays were held on 24 February at the Glaspalast Sindelfingen in Sindelfingen, while racewalking events were hosted in Halle on 1 March.

== Results ==
=== Men ===
Event	Gold		Silver		Bronze	
60 metres	Kevin Kranz; Sprintteam Wetzlar	6.59 s	Michael Pohl; Sprintteam Wetzlar	6.67 s	Michael Bryan; LC Rehlingen	6.68 s
200 metres	Patrick Domogala; MTG Mannheim	20.77 s	Maurice Huke; TV Wattenscheid	20.86 s	Tobias Lange; TSV Bayer 04 Leverkusen	21.07 s
400 metres	Torben Junker; LG Olympia Dortmund	47.18 s	Marvin Schlegel; LAC Erdgas Chemnitz	47.69 s	Marc Koch; LG Nord Berlin	47.75 s
800 metres	Robert Farken; SC DHfK Leipzig	1:49.60 min	Christoph Kessler; LG Region Karlsruhe	1:49.70 min	Jan Riedel; Dresdner SC	1:50.09 min
1500 metres	Marius Probst; TV Wattenscheid	3:42.38 min	Marc Reuther; LG Eintracht Frankfurt	3:44.07 min	Lukas Abele; SSC Hanau-Rodenbach	3:45.08 min
3000 metres	Sam Parsons; LG Eintracht Frankfurt	7:53.71 min	Amos Bartelsmeyer; LG Eintracht Frankfurt	7:54.39 min	Florian Orth; LG Telis Finanz Regensburg	8:00.08 min
60 m hurdles	Gregor Traber; LAV Tübingen	7.62 s	Erik Balnuweit; TV Wattenscheid	7.71 s	Luke Campbell; LG Eintracht Frankfurt	7.81 s
4 × 200 m relay	TSV Bayer 04 Leverkusen II; Aleixo-Platini Menga; Tobias Lange; Jonas Breitkopf; Daniel Hoffmann	1:24.92 min	TV Wattenscheid; Maurice Huke; Philipp Trutenat; Robert Hering; Maximilian Heinrichs	1:25.01 min	LT DSHS Köln; Dennis Horn; Dominik Wotzka; Marc van Rechtern; Björn Rasmus Pröve	1:28.07 min
3 × 1000 m relay	LG Region Karlsruhe 1 Holger Körner; Pascal Kleyer; Christoph Kessler	7:15.78 min	LG Olympia Dortmund; Constantin Feist; Steffen Baxheinrich; Maximilian Feist	7:28.19 min	Tobias Ferreira; Christoph Uhl; Alexander Kessler	7:36.49 min
5000 m walk	Christopher Linke; SC Potsdam	18:33.68 min	Nils Brembach; SC Potsdam	19:08.81 min	Leo Köpp; LG Nord Berlin	20:42.27 min
High jump	Mateusz Przybylko; TSV Bayer 04 Leverkusen	2.26 m	Falk Wendrich; LAZ Soest	2.26 m	Torsten Sanders; TSV Bayer 04 Leverkusen	2.23 m
Pole vault	Bo Kanda Lita Baehre; TSV Bayer 04 Leverkusen	5.60 m	Torben Blech; TSV Bayer 04 Leverkusen	5.50 m	Daniel Clemens; LAZ Zweibrücken	5.50 m
Long jump	Fabian Heinle; VfB Stuttgart	7.78 m	Maximilian Entholzner; 1. FC Passau	7.73 m	Gianluca Puglisi; Königsteiner LV	7.59 m
Triple jump	Max Heß; LAC Erdgas Chemnitz	16.74 m	Tobias Hell; Schweriner SC	15.85 m	Vincent Vogel; LAC Erdgas Chemnitz	15.42 m
Shot put	David Storl; SC DHfK Leipzig	21.32 m	Tobias Dahm; VfL Sindelfingen	19.42 m	Christian Zimmermann; Kirchheimer SC	19.39 m
Heptathlon	Andreas Bechmann; LG Eintracht Frankfurt	6017 pts	Tim Nowak; SSV Ulm 1846	5903 pts	Manuel Eitel; SSV Ulm 1846	5840 pts

=== Women ===
Event	Gold		Silver		Bronze	
60 metres	Lisa-Marie Kwayie; Neuköllner Sportfreunde	7.19 s	Alexandra Burghardt; LG Gendorf Wacker Burghausen	7.30 s	Rebekka Haase; Sprintteam Wetzlar	7.32 s
200 metres	Rebekka Haase; Sprintteam Wetzlar	23.04 s	Jessica-Bianca Wessolly; MTG Mannheim	23.33 s	Tiffany Eidner; Bad Lobenstein TC	23.92 s
400 metres	Nadine Gonska; MTG Mannheim	53.24 s	Luna Bulmahn; VfL Eintracht Hannover	53.67 s	Laura Müller; LC Rehlingen	54.20 s
800 metres	Katharina Trost; LG Stadtwerke München	2:05.16 min	Christina Hering; LG Stadtwerke München	2:05.16 min	Alina Ammann; TuS Esingen	2:05.71 min
1500 metres	Hanna Klein; SG Schorndorf	4:36.64 min	Gesa Felicitas Krause; Silvesterlauf Trier	4:37.65 min	Caterina Granz; LG Nord Berlin	4:37.71 min
3000 metres	Konstanze Klosterhalfen; TSV Bayer 04 Leverkusen	8:32.47 min NR	Alina Reh; SSV Ulm 1846	8:43.72 min	Deborah Schöneborn; LG Nord Berlin	9:21.77 min
60 m hurdles	Pamela Dutkiewicz; TV Wattenscheid	7.90 s	Cindy Roleder; SV Halle	8.00 s	Louisa Grauvogel; TSV Bayer 04 Leverkusen	8.16 s
4 × 200 m relay	MTG Mannheim; Jessica-Bianca Wessolly; Ricarda Lobe; Nadine Gonska; Katrin Wallmann	1:34.89 min	TSV Bayer 04 Leverkusen I Jennifer Montag; Louisa Grauvogel; Frieda Breitkopf; Mareike Arndt	1:35.66 min	LT DSHS Köln I Felicitas Ulmer; Christine Salterberg; Laura Sophie Großhaus; Nelly Schmidt	1:35.92 min
3 × 800 m relay	TSV Bayer 04 Leverkusen; Berit Scheid; Lena Klaassen; Rebekka Ackers	6:31.11 min	ASV Köln; Kim Uhlendorf; Vera Hoffmann; Christina Zwirner	6:33.94 min	Startgemeinschaft Pliezhausen-Gomar-Balingen; Katrin Wallner; Julia Rieger; Kim Penz	6:49.51 min
3000 m walk	Teresa Zurek; SC Potsdam	12:47.36 min	Saskia Feige; SC Potsdam	13:07.16 min	Josephine Grandi; SC Potsdam	14:32.90 min
High jump	Imke Onnen; Hannover 96	1.96 m	Marie-Laurence Jungfleisch; VfB Stuttgart	1.90 m	Christina Honsel; LG Olympia Dortmund	1.90 m
Pole vault	Lisa Ryzih; ABC Ludwigshafen	4.60 m	Katharina Bauer; TSV Bayer 04 Leverkusen	4.55 m	Regine Bakenecker; TSV Bayer 04 Leverkusen	4.30 m
Long jump	Malaika Mihambo; LG Kurpfalz	6.72 m	Annika Gärtz; LV 90 Erzgebirge	6.47 m	Merle Homeier; VfL Bückeburg	6.38 m
Triple jump	Kristin Gierisch; LAC Erdgas Chemnitz	14.38 m	Jenny Elbe; Dresdner SC	13.76 m	Maria Purtsa; LAC Erdgas Chemnitz	13.46 m
Shot put	Christina Schwanitz; LV 90 Erzgebirge	19.54 m	Alina Kenzel; VfL Waiblingen	17.94 m	Sara Gambetta; SV Halle	17.90 m
Pentathlon	Sophie Hamann; TuS Metzingen	4060 pts	Annika Gärtz; LV 90 Erzgebirge	4001 pts	Laura Voß; LT DSHS Köln	3965 pts
