= Athletics at the 2014 Summer Youth Olympics – Boys' 10 kilometre walk =

Athletics – Boys' 10 kilometre walk at the II Summer Youth Olympic Games
- Venue: Nanjing Olympic Sports Centre
- Date: August 24
- Competitors: 15 from 15 nations

Medalists
1st place, gold medalist(s)		Minoru Onogawa	Japan
2nd place, silver medalist(s)		Vladislav Saraikin	Russia
3rd place, bronze medalist(s)		Noel Chama	Mexico

The boys’ 10 kilometre walk event at the 2014 Summer Youth Olympics was held on 24 August 2014 in Nanjing Olympic Sports Center.

== Schedule ==
Date	Time	Round
24 August 2014	19:05	Final

== Results ==
=== Final ===
Rank	Athlete	Result	Notes
1st place, gold medalist(s)	Minoru Onogawa (JPN)	42:03.64	PB
2nd place, silver medalist(s)	Vladislav Saraykin (RUS)	42:10.95	PB
3rd place, bronze medalist(s)	Noel Chama (MEX)	42:14.11	
4	César Rodríguez (PER)	42:26.49	
5	Joo Hyeonmyeong (KOR)	43:51.89	PB
6	Manuel Bermúdez (ESP)	44:12.55	
7	Chang Wei-Lin (TPE)	44:27.87	PB
8	Arturs Makars (LAT)	46:29.07	
9	Pablo Rodríguez (BOL)	46:45.49	
10	Ionut Adrian Postoaca (ROU)	48:29.10	
11	Gemechu Amanuel (ETH)	48:54.97	
	Giacomo Brandi (ITA)	DNF	
	Jefferson Chacón (VEN)	DNF	
	He Xianghong (CHN)	DNF	
	Djaber Bouras (ALG)	DSQ	

Intermediate times:

1000m	4:06.92	Noel Chama (MEX)
2000m	8:12.94	Noel Chama (MEX)
3000m	12:19.48	Noel Chama (MEX)
4000m	16:29.56	Noel Chama (MEX)
5000m	20:43.96	Minoru Onogawa (JPN)
6000m	25:04.23	Noel Chama (MEX)
7000m	29:20.41	Noel Chama (MEX)
8000m	33:37.09	Minoru Onogawa (JPN)
9000m	37:53.90	Noel Chama (MEX)
