= Teresa Zurek =

German racewalker (born 1998)

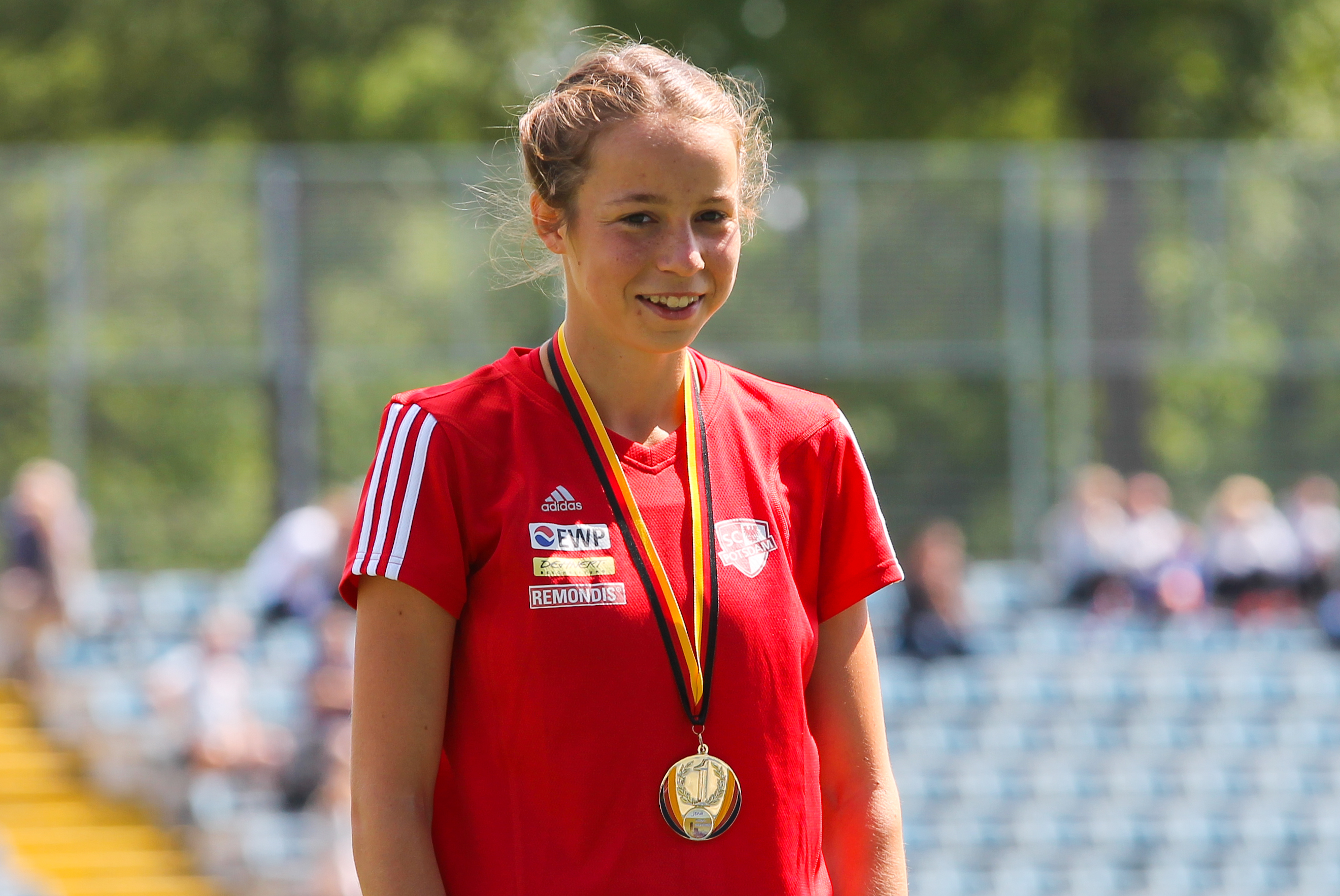
- Teresa Zurek in 2015

Personal information
- Born: 29 July 1998 (age 27)

Sport
- Country: Germany
- Event: Racewalking
Medal record
Women's racewalking
Representing Germany
Military World Games
Bronze medal – third place	2019 Wuhan	20 km walk
German Indoor Athletics Championships
Gold medal – first place	2016 Leipzig	3000 m walk
Gold medal – first place	2017 Leipzig	3000 m walk
Gold medal – first place	2018 Leipzig	3000 m walk
Gold medal – first place	2019 Leipzig	3000 m walk

Teresa Zurek (born 29 July 1998) is a German racewalker.

In 2016, Zurek finished in 11th place in the women's 10,000 metres walk at the 2016 IAAF World U20 Championships held in Bydgoszcz, Poland. The following year, she won the silver medal in the women's 10,000 metres walk at the 2017 European Athletics U20 Championships held in Grosseto, Italy. In 2018, she competed in the women's 20 kilometres walk at the 2018 European Athletics Championships held in Berlin, Germany. She finished in 20th place.

In 2019, Zurek finished in 8th place in the women's 20 kilometres walk event at the European Athletics U23 Championships held in Gävle, Sweden. In the same year, she won the bronze medal in the women's 20 kilometres walk at the 2019 Military World Games held in Wuhan, China.
