= Yang Jiayu =

Chinese race walker (born 1996)

Personal information
- Born: 18 February 1996 (age 30) Wuhai, Inner Mongolia, China
- Height: 163 cm (5 ft 4 in)
- Weight: 48 kg (106 lb)

Sport
- Country: China
- Sport: Athletics
- Event: 20 km Race Walk
Medal record
Representing China
Olympic Games
Gold medal – first place	2024 Paris	20 km walk
World Championships
Gold medal – first place	2017 London	20 km walk
Asian Games
Gold medal – first place	2018 Jakarta	20 km walk
Gold medal – first place	2022 Hangzhou	20 km walk

Yang Jiayu (Chinese: 杨家玉; born 18 February 1996) is a Chinese race walker and Olympic champion. She specialises in the women's 10 kilometres and 20 kilometres race walk events, and holds the world record in the latter. At the 2024 Summer Olympics, Yang won gold in the 20 kilometres walk. She also won the 20 kilometre walk at the 2017 World Championships in Athletics.

== Biography ==
In May 2014, Yang participated in the 2014 World Cup, placing second in the women's 10 km (junior) event in 43:37, behind Duan Dandan.

On August 13, 2017, Yang won the 20 km race at the 2017 World Championships with a personal best of 1:26:18, ahead of Mexican María Guadalupe González and Italian Antonella Palmisano. Her compatriot, Lü Xiuzhi, was dramatically disqualified just about 20 metres away from winning the bronze medal.

In 2019, Yang competed in the women's 20 kilometres walk event at the 2019 World Athletics Championships held in Doha, Qatar. She was disqualified after a fourth red card.

In 2021, Yang set a new world record in the women's 20km race walk, with a time of 1:23:49 at the Chinese Race Walking Championships in Huangshan.

At the 2024 Summer Olympics, Yang won the gold medal in the 20-kilometre race walk event.

== See also ==
- China at the 2017 World Championships in Athletics
- China at the 2024 Summer Olympics
