= José Santos Valdés =

Mexican sport shooter

José Santos Valdés Martinez
Personal information
- Nationality: Mexico
- Born: 1 August 1997 (age 28) Saltillo, Mexico
- Height: 1.65 m (5 ft 5 in)
- Weight: 65 kg (143 lb)

Sport
- Sport: Shooting
- Event: 10 m air rifle (AR60)
- Club: Club Cinegetico a tiro de Coahuila
Medal record
Men's shooting
Representing Mexico
Summer Youth Olympics
Silver medal – second place	2014 Nanjing	10m Air Rifle MixedNOC

José Santos Valdés Martinez (born August 1, 1997, in Saltillo, Mexico) is a Mexican sport shooter. He won the silver medal in the 2014 Summer Youth Olympics in the 10 meters Air Rifle 10m Air Rifle Mixed International Teams (Mixed-NOC) event.

== Career ==
Valdés participated in the 2014 ISSF World Cup, held at Fort Benning, where he claimed the 2nd place in the 10m Air Rifle Men Youth event. He scored 199.3 points.

He won a quota to participate in the 2014 Summer Youth Olympics after ending second in an American Continental YOG Qualification competition (2014 ISSF World Cup). There he claimed the precious silver medal in the 10m Air Rifle Mixed International Teams (Mixed-NOC) event, which he partnered with Fernanda Russo from Argentina.
