= Daniela García (footballer) =

Mexican footballer (born 1992)

Personal information
- Full name: Daniela Itzaxaya García González
- Date of birth: 21 July 1992 (age 34)
- Place of birth: Iztapalapa, Mexico City, Mexico
- Height: 1.60 m (5 ft 3 in)
- Position: Attacking midfielder

Senior career*
Years	Team	Apps	(Gls)
2017–2023	UNAM	143	(21)
2023–2024	Santos Laguna	41	(5)
2025–2026	Mazatlán	22	(1)
- * Club domestic league appearances and goals as of 9 February 2026

Daniela Itzaxaya García González (born 21 July 1992) is a Mexican professional footballer who plays as an attacking midfielder.

== Career ==
In 2017, she started her career in UNAM. In 2023, she was transferred to Santos Laguna.
