= Noemi Stella =

Italian race walker (born 1997)

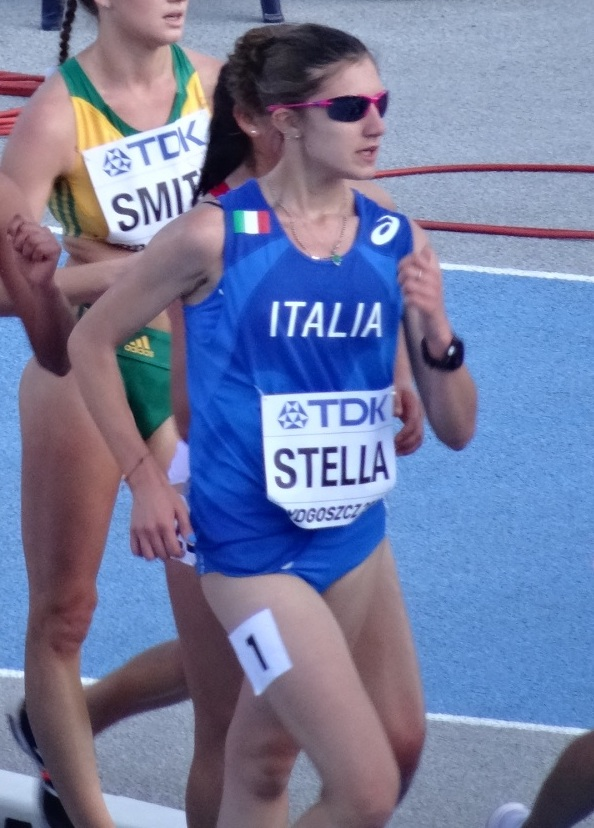
- Noemi Stella in 2016

Personal information
- Nationality: Italian
- Born: 2 February 1997 (age 29) Grottaglie
- Height: 1.65 m (5 ft 5 in)
- Weight: 50 kg (110 lb)

Sport
- Country: Italy
- Sport: Athletics
- Event: Racewalking
- Club: C.S. Carabinieri

Achievements and titles
- Personal bests: 10000 m walk: 44:43.78 (2015); 10 km walk: 45:55 (2016)

Noemi Stella (born 2 February 1997) is an Italian race walker who won bronze in the 5 km at the 2014 Summer Youth Olympics.

Stella is an athlete of the Centro Sportivo Carabinieri.

== Achievements ==
Year	Competition	Venue	Position	Event	Time	Notes
2016	World U20 Championships	(Poland) Bydgoszcz	2nd	10,000 metres walk	14:21.22	PB
