= Valeria Ortuño =

Mexican racewalker (born 1998)

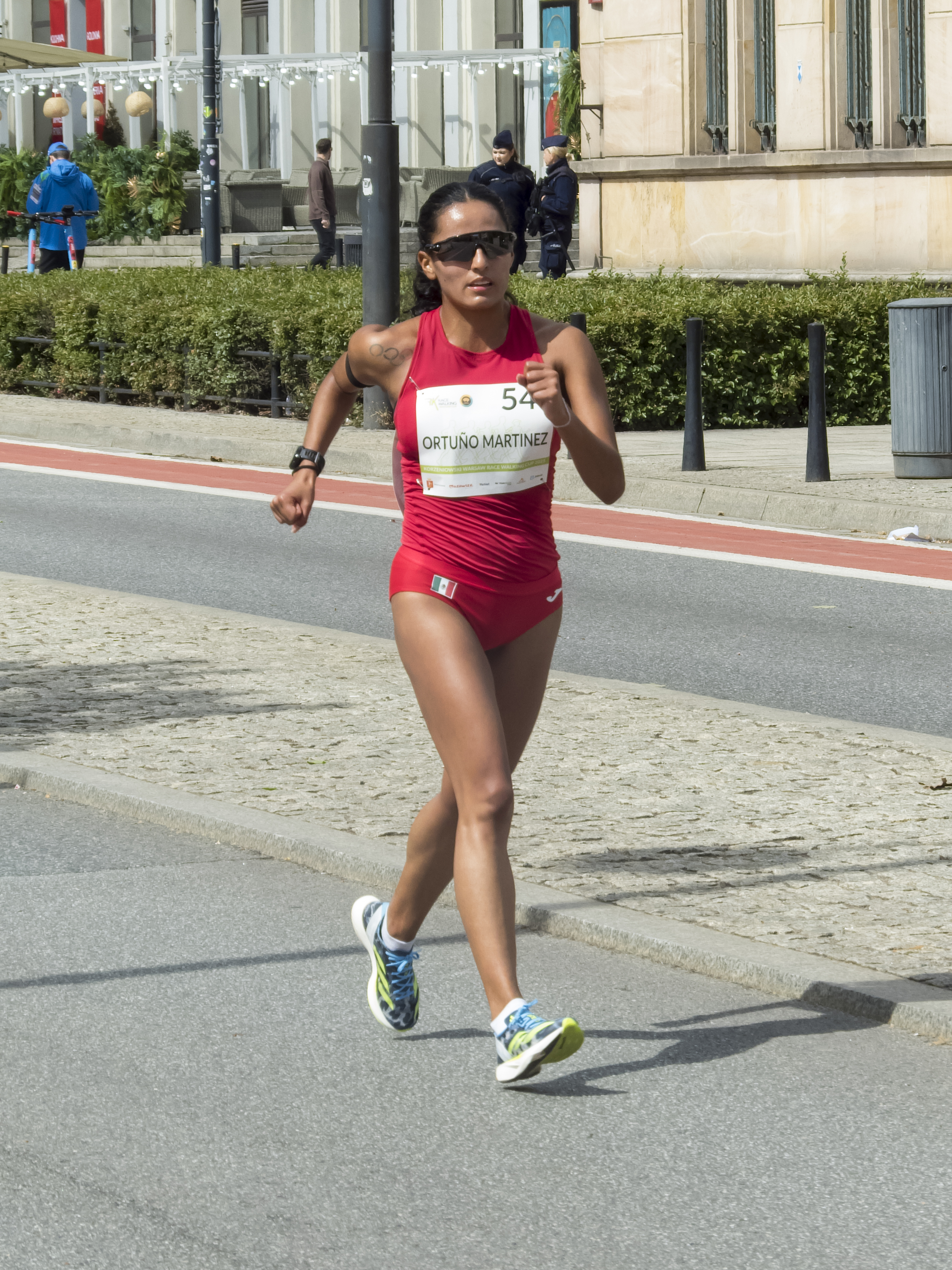

Personal information
- Born: 27 May 1998 (age 28)

Sport
- Country: Mexico
- Event: Racewalking
Medal record
Women's racewalking
Representing Mexico
Summer Youth Olympics
Silver medal – second place	2014 Nanjing	5 km walk

Valeria Ortuño Martínez (born 27 May 1998) is a Mexican racewalker. She competed in the women's 20 kilometres walk event at the 2019 World Athletics Championships held in Doha, Qatar. She finished in 32nd place with a time of 1:43:51. She also competed in the same event at the 2022 World Athletics Championships held in Eugene, Oregon, United States.

In 2014, she won the silver medal in the girls' 5 kilometre walk at the Summer Youth Olympics held in Nanjing, China.
