= Badminton at the 2014 Summer Youth Olympics =

Badminton at the II Summer Youth Olympic Games
- Venue: Nanjing Sport Institute
- Dates: 17 – 22 August 2014
- No. of events: 3 (1 boys, 1 girls, 1 mixed)
- Competitors: 64 (32 boys, 32 girls) from 38 nations

Badminton at the 2014 Summer Youth Olympics took place from 17 to 22 August 2014. The competition was held at the Nanjing Sport Institute in Nanjing, China.

== Qualification ==
56 places, 28 per each gender were decided by the junior world rankings released on 2 May 2014. Each National Olympic Committee (NOC) could enter a maximum of 2 competitors per gender should they both rank in the top 4 in the junior world rankings. Each of the five continents must be represented in each gender thus the highest ranked player from each continent automatically qualifies. China will also automatically qualify due to it being the host nation, however this did not happen as China already qualified two athletes in each gender due to rankings. Finally, the quarterfinalists from the 2014 World Junior Championships qualified provided they did not surpass the maximum quota for each NOC. A further 8 spots, 4 in each gender were also allocated by the Tripartite Commission.

To be eligible to participate at the 2014 Youth Olympics, athletes must have been born between 1 January 1996 and 31 December 1999.

=== Boys ===
No.	Rank	Player	NOC	Note
1	1	Shi Yuqi	China	Asia
2	2	Lin Guipu	China	
3	3	Anthony Sinisuka Ginting	Indonesia	
4	6	Cheam June Wei	Malaysia	
5	7	Kanta Tsuneyama	Japan	
6	8	Phạm Cao Cường	Vietnam	
7	9	Max Weißkirchen	Germany	Europe
8	10	Lee Cheuk Yiu	Hong Kong	
9	11	Alex Vlaar	Netherlands	
10	12	Luís Enrique Peñalver	Spain	
11	16	Aditya Joshi	India	
12	17	Bernard Ong	Singapore	
13	18	Luis Ramón Garrido	Mexico	America
14	19	Tanguy Citron	France	
15	20	Wolfgang Gnedt	Austria	
16	23	Seo Seung-jae	South Korea	
17	25	Vladimir Shishkov	Bulgaria	
18	26	Dragoslav Petrović	Serbia	
19	27	Ruslan Sarsekenov	Ukraine	
20	28	Ygor Coelho	Brazil	
21	31	Muhammed Ali Kurt	Turkey	
22	33	Krzysztof Jakowczuk	Poland	
23	35	Sachin Dias	Sri Lanka	
24	36	Andraž Krapež	Slovenia	
25	38	Lu Chia-hung	Chinese Taipei	
26	43	Mek Narongrit	Thailand	
27	60	Daniel Guda	Australia	Oceania
28	70	Abdelrahman Abdelhakim	Egypt	Africa
29	NR	Devins Mananga Nzoussi	Republic of the Congo	Tripartite Invitation
30	87	Abraham Ayittey	Ghana	Tripartite Invitation
31	389	Daniel Mihigo	Uganda	Tripartite Invitation
32	194	Dipesh Dhami	Nepal	Tripartite Invitation

=== Girls ===
No.	Rank	Player	NOC	Note
1	1	Akane Yamaguchi	Japan	Asia
2	2	He Bingjiao	China	
3	3	Busanan Ongbamrungphan	Thailand	
4	4	Qin Jinjing	China	
5	5	Liang Xiaoyu	Singapore	
6	9	Luise Heim	Germany	Europe
7	10	Gadde Ruthvika Shivani	India	
8	11	Clara Azurmendi	Spain	
9	12	Mia Blichfeldt	Denmark	
10	14	Maja Pavlinić	Croatia	
11	15	Lee Ying Ying	Malaysia	
12	16	Ruselli Hartawan	Indonesia	
13	17	Alida Chen	Netherlands	
14	19	Mariya Mitsova	Bulgaria	
15	22	Vladyslava Lesnaya	Ukraine	
16	26	Lole Courtois	France	
17	28	Aliye Demirbağ	Turkey	
18	29	Lee Chia-hsin	Chinese Taipei	
19	31	Kim Ga-eun	South Korea	
20	33	Sabrina Solis	Mexico	America
21	37	Joy Lai	Australia	Oceania
22	42	Daniela Macías	Peru	
23	43	Magda Konieczna	Poland	
24	45	Janine Lais	Austria	
25	46	Katarina Beton	Slovenia	
26	52	Kristin Kuuba	Estonia	
27	61	Thilini Hendahewa	Sri Lanka	Tripartite Invitation
28	62	Doha Hany	Egypt	Africa
29	66	Ng Tsz Yau	Hong Kong	
30	150	Tessa Kabelo	Botswana	Tripartite Invitation
31	750	Chlorie Cadeau	Seychelles	Tripartite Invitation
32	NR	Rugshaar Ishaak	Suriname	Tripartite Invitation

== Schedule ==
The schedule was released by the Nanjing Youth Olympic Games Organizing Committee.

All times are CST (UTC+8)

Event date	Event day	Starting time	Event details
August 17	Sunday	09:00; 13:30	Boys' Singles Group Stage; Girls' Singles Group Stage
August 17	Sunday	18:30	Mixed Doubles Group Stage
August 18	Monday	09:00; 13:30	Boys' Singles Group Stage; Girls' Singles Group Stage
August 18	Monday	18:30	Mixed Doubles Group Stage
August 19	Tuesday	09:00; 13:30	Boys' Singles Group Stage; Girls' Singles Group Stage
August 19	Tuesday	18:30	Mixed Doubles Group Stage
August 20	Wednesday	18:30	Boys' Singles Quarterfinals; Girls' Singles Quarterfinals; Mixed Doubles Quarterfinals
August 21	Thursday	17:00	Boys' Singles Semifinals; Girls' Singles Semifinals; Mixed Doubles Semifinals
August 22	Friday	12:00	Boys' Singles Bronze Medal Match; Girls' Singles Bronze Medal Match; Mixed Doubles Bronze Medal Match
August 22	Friday	17:00	Boys' Singles Gold Medal Match; Girls' Singles Gold Medal Match; Mixed Doubles Gold Medal Match

== Medal summary ==
=== Medal table ===
* Host nation (China)

Rank	Nation	Gold	Silver	Bronze	Total
1	China*	2	1	0	3
2	Mixed-NOCs	1	1	1	3
3	Japan	0	1	0	1
4	Indonesia	0	0	1	1
4	Thailand	0	0	1	1
Totals (5 entries)		3	3	3	9

=== Events ===
Event	Gold	Silver	Bronze
Boys' singles	Shi Yuqi; China	Lin Guipu; China	Anthony Sinisuka Ginting; Indonesia
Girls' singles	He Bingjiao; China	Akane Yamaguchi; Japan	Busanan Ongbamrungphan; Thailand
Mixed doubles	Cheam June Wei; Malaysia; Ng Tsz Yau; Hong Kong	Kanta Tsuneyama; Japan; Lee Chia-hsin; Chinese Taipei	Sachin Dias; Sri Lanka; He Bingjiao; China
