= Badminton at the 2014 Summer Youth Olympics – Mixed doubles =

Mixed doubles at the II Summer Youth Olympic Games
- Venue: Nanjing Sport Institute
- Dates: 17–22 August 2014
- Competitors: 64 from 38 nations

Medalists
1st place, gold medalist(s)		Cheam June Wei	Mixed-NOCs
1st place, gold medalist(s)		Ng Tsz Yau	Mixed-NOCs
2nd place, silver medalist(s)		Kanta Tsuneyama	Mixed-NOCs
2nd place, silver medalist(s)		Lee Chia-hsin	Mixed-NOCs
3rd place, bronze medalist(s)		Sachin Dias	Mixed-NOCs
3rd place, bronze medalist(s)		He Bingjiao	Mixed-NOCs

The mixed doubles badminton event at the 2014 Summer Youth Olympics were held at Nanjing Sport Institute. It was the first time the event was part of the Youth Olympic Games sports program and it was part of the mixed NOC events. The 64 qualified athletes from the boys and girls events was divided to mixed team. The 32 teams were split into eight groups, with four teams each. In their groups, they play a one-way round-robin and the first team of each group qualifies to the quarterfinals, where they play a knock-out stage until the medal matches.

== Group play ==
=== Groups ===
Group A	Group B	Group C	Group D
Athlete	Athlete	Athlete	Athlete
Sarsekenov (UKR)/ Yamaguchi (JPN) Joshi (IND)/ Kabelo (BOT); Krapež (SLO)/ Chen (NED); Abdelhakim (EGY)/ Mitsova (BUL)	Guda (AUS)/ Hartawan (INA) Mananga Nzoussi (CGO)/ Blichfeldt (DEN); Narongrit (THA)/ Qin (CHN); Peñalver (ESP)/ Cadeau (SEY)	Lin (CHN)/ Kim (KOR) Citron (FRA)/ Macías (PER); Cheam (MAS)/ Ng (HKG); Gnedt (AUT)/ Solis (MEX)	Petrović (SRB)/ Liang (SIN) Garrido (MEX)/ Kuuba (EST); Lu (TPE)/ Lee (MAS); Phạm (VIE)/ Demirbağ (TUR)
Group E	Group F	Group G	Group H
Athlete	Athlete	Athlete	Athlete
Dhami (NEP)/ Ongbamrungphan (THA) Jakowczuk (POL)/ Azurmendi (ESP); Tsuneyama (JPN)/ Lee (TPE); Lee (HKG)/ Konieczna (POL)	Vlaar (NED)/ Lais (AUT) Coelho (BRA)/ Lesnaya (UKR); Shi (CHN)/ Lai (AUS); Seo (KOR)/ Hany (EGY)	Kurt (TUR)/ Pavlinić (CRO) Shishkov (BUL)/ Heim (GER); Ginting (INA)/ Beton (SLO); Weißkirchen (GER)/ Ishaak (SUR)	Ong (SIN)/ Hendahewa (SRI) Ayittey (GHA)/ Gadde (IND); Dias (SRI)/ He (CHN); Mihigo (UGA)/ Courtois (FRA)

=== Results ===
Key to colours in group tables
Player advancing to knockout stage

==== Group A ====
Athlete	Matches			Sets			Points		
Athlete	W	L	Tot	W	L	Diff	W	L	Diff
Krapež (SLO)/ Chen (NED)	3	0	3	6	1	+5	0	0	0
Sarsekenov (UKR)/ Yamaguchi (JPN)	2	1	3	4	2	+2	0	0	0
Joshi (IND)/ Kabelo (BOT)	1	2	3	3	5	-2	0	0	0
Abdelhakim (EGY)/ Mitsova (BUL)	0	3	3	1	6	-5	0	0	0

Sunday, 17 August
18:30
Ruslan Sarsekenov (UKR); Akane Yamaguchi (JPN)	2-0	Aditya Joshi (IND); Tessa Kabelo (BOT)	21–17, 21–19	24min	Court 1
18:30
Andraž Krapež (SLO); Alida Chen (NED)	2-0	Abdelrahman Abdelhakim (EGY); Mariya Mitsova (BUL)	21–13, 21–10	21min	Court 2
Monday, 18 August
18:30
Ruslan Sarsekenov (UKR); Akane Yamaguchi (JPN)	2-0	Abdelrahman Abdelhakim (EGY); Mariya Mitsova (BUL)	21–13, 21–16	23min	Court 1
18:30
Andraž Krapež (SLO); Alida Chen (NED)	2-1	Aditya Joshi (IND); Tessa Kabelo (BOT)	21–12, 17-21, 21–13	34min	Court 2
Tuesday, 19 August
18:30
Aditya Joshi (IND); Tessa Kabelo (BOT)	2-1	Abdelrahman Abdelhakim (EGY); Mariya Mitsova (BUL)	20-22, 21–18, 21–11	33min	Court 1
18:30
Andraž Krapež (SLO); Alida Chen (NED)	2-0	Ruslan Sarsekenov (UKR); Akane Yamaguchi (JPN)	21–19, 21–17	31min	Court 2

==== Group B ====
Athlete	Matches			Sets			Points		
Athlete	W	L	Tot	W	L	Diff	W	L	Diff
Narongrit (THA)/ Qin (CHN)	3	0	3	6	0	+6	0	0	0
Guda (AUS)/ Hartawan (INA)	2	1	3	4	2	+2	0	0	0
Peñalver (ESP)/ Cadeau (SEY)	1	2	3	2	4	-2	0	0	0
Mananga Nzoussi (CGO)/ Blichfeldt (DEN)	0	3	3	0	6	-6	0	0	0

Sunday, 17 August
18:30
Daniel Guda (AUS); Ruselli Hartawan (INA)	2-0	Devins Mananga Nzoussi (CGO); Mia Blichfeldt (DEN)	21–10, 21–7	21min	Court 3
19:05
Mek Narongrit (THA); Qin Jinjing (CHN)	2-0	Luís Enrique Peñalver (ESP); Chlorie Cadeau (SEY)	21–8, 21–6	19min	Court 2
Monday, 18 August
18:30
Mek Narongrit (THA); Qin Jinjing (CHN)	2-0	Devins Mananga Nzoussi (CGO); Mia Blichfeldt (DEN)	21–9, 21–5	22min	Court 3
19:05
Daniel Guda (AUS); Ruselli Hartawan (INA)	2-0	Luís Enrique Peñalver (ESP); Chlorie Cadeau (SEY)	21–12, 21–19	22min	Court 2
Tuesday, 19 August
18:30
Mek Narongrit (THA); Qin Jinjing (CHN)	2-0	Daniel Guda (AUS); Ruselli Hartawan (INA)	21–13, 21–19	28min	Court 3
19:05
Luís Enrique Peñalver (ESP); Chlorie Cadeau (SEY)	2-0	Devins Mananga Nzoussi (CGO); Mia Blichfeldt (DEN)	21–16, 21–18	25min	Court 2

==== Group C ====
Athlete	Matches			Sets			Points		
Athlete	W	L	Tot	W	L	Diff	W	L	Diff
Cheam (MAS)/ Ng (HKG)	3	0	3	6	0	+6	0	0	0
Lin (CHN)/ Kim (KOR)	2	1	3	4	3	+1	0	0	0
Gnedt (AUT)/ Solis (MEX)	1	2	3	2	5	-3	0	0	0
Citron (FRA)/ Macías (PER)	0	3	3	2	6	-4	0	0	0

Sunday, 17 August
19:05
Lin Guipu (CHN); Kim Ga-eun (KOR)	2-1	Tanguy Citron (FRA); Daniela Macías (PER)	21–11, 21-23, 21–14	41min	Court 1
19:40
Cheam June Wei (MAS); Ng Tsz Yau (HKG)	2-0	Wolfgang Gnedt (AUT); Sabrina Solis (MEX)	21–12, 21–9	20min	Court 1
Monday, 18 August
19:05
Lin Guipu (CHN); Kim Ga-eun (KOR)	2-0	Wolfgang Gnedt (AUT); Sabrina Solis (MEX)	21–7, 21–7	16min	Court 1
19:05
Cheam June Wei (MAS); Ng Tsz Yau (HKG)	2-0	Tanguy Citron (FRA); Daniela Macías (PER)	21–9, 21–8	22min	Court 3
Tuesday, 19 August
19:05
Cheam June Wei (MAS); Ng Tsz Yau (HKG)	2-0	Lin Guipu (CHN); Kim Ga-eun (KOR)	22–20, 21–19	29min	Court 1
19:05
Wolfgang Gnedt (AUT); Sabrina Solis (MEX)	2-1	Tanguy Citron (FRA); Daniela Macías (PER)	21–13, 17-21, 21–19	41min	Court 3

==== Group D ====
Athlete	Matches			Sets			Points		
Athlete	W	L	Tot	W	L	Diff	W	L	Diff
Lu (TPE)/ Lee (MAS)	3	0	3	6	2	+4	0	0	0
Petrović (SRB)/ Liang (SIN)	1	2	3	4	4	0	0	0	0
Garrido (MEX)/ Kuuba (EST)	1	2	3	2	5	-3	0	0	0
Phạm (VIE)/ Demirbağ (TUR)	1	2	3	4	5	-1	0	0	0

Sunday, 17 August
19:05
Dragoslav Petrović (SRB); Liang Xiaoyu (SIN)	2-0	Luis Ramón Garrido (MEX); Kristin Kuuba (EST)	21–17, 22–20	27min	Court 3
19:40
Lu Chia-hung (TPE); Lee Ying Ying (MAS)	2-1	Phạm Cao Cường (VIE); Aliye Demirbağ (TUR)	19-21, 21–9, 21–17	40min	Court 2
Monday, 18 August
19:40
Luis Ramón Garrido (MEX); Kristin Kuuba (EST)	2-1	Phạm Cao Cường (VIE); Aliye Demirbağ (TUR)	14-21, 21–12, 22–20	35min	Court 1
19:40
Lu Chia-hung (TPE); Lee Ying Ying (MAS)	2-1	Dragoslav Petrović (SRB); Liang Xiaoyu (SIN)	21–18, 17-21, 21–7	45min	Court 2
Tuesday, 19 August
19:40
Lu Chia-hung (TPE); Lee Ying Ying (MAS)	2-0	Luis Ramón Garrido (MEX); Kristin Kuuba (EST)	21–17, 21–18	28min	Court 1
19:40
Phạm Cao Cường (VIE); Aliye Demirbağ (TUR)	2-1	Dragoslav Petrović (SRB); Liang Xiaoyu (SIN)	21–19, 14-21, 21–15	38min	Court 2

==== Group E ====
Athlete	Matches			Sets			Points		
Athlete	W	L	Tot	W	L	Diff	W	L	Diff
Tsuneyama (JPN)/ Lee (TPE)	3	0	3	6	1	+5	0	0	0
Lee (HKG)/ Konieczna (POL)	2	1	3	5	4	+1	0	0	0
Dhami (NEP)/ Ongbamrungphan (THA)	1	2	3	3	5	-2	0	0	0
Jakowczuk (POL)/ Azurmendi (ESP)	0	3	3	2	6	-4	0	0	0

Sunday, 17 August
20:15
Dipesh Dhami (NEP); Busanan Ongbamrungphan (THA)	2-1	Krzysztof Jakowczuk (POL); Clara Azurmendi (ESP)	21–19, 19-21, 21–12	39min	Court 3
20:50
Kanta Tsuneyama (JPN); Lee Chia-hsin (TPE)	2-1	Lee Cheuk Yiu (HKG); Magda Konieczna (POL)	15-21, 21–8, 21–15	37min	Court 1
Monday, 18 August
19:40
Kanta Tsuneyama (JPN); Lee Chia-hsin (TPE)	2-0	Krzysztof Jakowczuk (POL); Clara Azurmendi (ESP)	21–10, 21–10	23min	Court 3
20:50
Lee Cheuk Yiu (HKG); Magda Konieczna (POL)	2-1	Dipesh Dhami (NEP); Busanan Ongbamrungphan (THA)	22–20, 18-21, 23–21	42min	Court 3
Tuesday, 19 August
19:40
Kanta Tsuneyama (JPN); Lee Chia-hsin (TPE)	2-0	Dipesh Dhami (NEP); Busanan Ongbamrungphan (THA)	21–8, 21–13	25min	Court 3
20:15
Lee Cheuk Yiu (HKG); Magda Konieczna (POL)	2-1	Krzysztof Jakowczuk (POL); Clara Azurmendi (ESP)	21–17, 10-21, 21–19	33min	Court 2

==== Group F ====
Athlete	Matches			Sets			Points		
Athlete	W	L	Tot	W	L	Diff	W	L	Diff
Shi (CHN)/ Lai (AUS)	3	0	3	6	0	0	0	0	0
Seo (KOR)/ Hany (EGY)	1	2	3	2	4	0	0	0	0
Coelho (BRA)/ Lesnaya (UKR)	1	2	3	2	4	0	0	0	0
Vlaar (NED)/ Lais (AUT)	1	2	3	2	4	0	0	0	0

Sunday, 17 August
19:40
Alex Vlaar (NED); Janine Lais (AUT)	2-0	Ygor Coelho (BRA); Vladyslava Lesnaya (UKR)	21–11, 21–19	27min	Court 3
20:15
Shi Yuqi (CHN); Joy Lai (AUS)	2-0	Seo Seung-jae (KOR); Doha Hany (EGY)	21–15, 21–10	21min	Court 1
Monday, 18 August
20:15
Shi Yuqi (CHN); Joy Lai (AUS)	2-0	Alex Vlaar (NED); Janine Lais (AUT)	21–16, 21–16	27min	Court 1
20:15
Ygor Coelho (BRA); Vladyslava Lesnaya (UKR)	2-0	Seo Seung-jae (KOR); Doha Hany (EGY)	21–16, 21–15	23min	Court 3
Tuesday, 19 August
20:15
Shi Yuqi (CHN); Joy Lai (AUS)	2-0	Ygor Coelho (BRA); Vladyslava Lesnaya (UKR)	21–19, 21–14	28min	Court 1
20:15
Seo Seung-jae (KOR); Doha Hany (EGY)	2-0	Alex Vlaar (NED); Janine Lais (AUT)	21–16, 21–16	23min	Court 3

==== Group G ====
Athlete	Matches			Sets			Points		
Athlete	W	L	Tot	W	L	Diff	W	L	Diff
Ginting (INA)/ Beton (SLO)	3	0	3	6	0	+6	0	0	0
Kurt (TUR)/ Pavlinić (CRO)	2	1	3	4	2	+2	0	0	0
Weißkirchen (GER)/ Ishaak (SUR)	1	2	3	2	4	-2	0	0	0
Shishkov (BUL)/ Heim (GER)	0	3	3	0	6	-6	0	0	0

Sunday, 17 August
20:15
Muhammed Ali Kurt (TUR); Maja Pavlinić (CRO)	2-0	Vladimir Shishkov (BUL); Luise Heim (GER)	21–18, 21–7	24min	Court 2
20:50
Anthony Sinisuka Ginting (INA); Katarina Beton (SLO)	2-0	Max Weißkirchen (GER); Rugshaar Ishaak (SUR)	21–16, 21–8	25min	Court 2
Monday, 18 August
20:15
Anthony Sinisuka Ginting (INA); Katarina Beton (SLO)	2-0	Muhammed Ali Kurt (TUR); Maja Pavlinić (CRO)	21–18, 21–19	28min	Court 2
20:50
Max Weißkirchen (GER); Rugshaar Ishaak (SUR)	2-0	Vladimir Shishkov (BUL); Luise Heim (GER)	21–18, 21–18	23min	Court 2
Tuesday, 19 August
20:50
Muhammed Ali Kurt (TUR); Maja Pavlinić (CRO)	2-0	Max Weißkirchen (GER); Rugshaar Ishaak (SUR)	21–15, 22–20	27min	Court 2
20:50
Anthony Sinisuka Ginting (INA); Katarina Beton (SLO)	2-0	Vladimir Shishkov (BUL); Luise Heim (GER)	21–19, 21–9	25min	Court 3

==== Group H ====
Athlete	Matches			Sets			Points		
Athlete	W	L	Tot	W	L	Diff	W	L	Diff
Dias (SRI)/ He (CHN)	3	0	3	6	0	+6	0	0	0
Ong (SIN)/ Hendahewa (SRI)	2	1	3	4	2	+2	0	0	0
Mihigo (UGA)/ Courtois (FRA)	1	2	3	2	4	-2	0	0	0
Ayittey (GHA)/ Gadde (IND)	0	3	3	0	6	-6	0	0	0

Sunday, 17 August
20:50
Bernard Ong (SIN); Thilini Hendahewa (SRI)	2-0	Abraham Ayittey (GHA); Gadde Ruthvika Shivani (IND)	walkover	0min	Court 3
21:25
Sachin Dias (SRI); He Bingjiao (CHN)	2-0	Daniel Mihigo (UGA); Lole Courtois (FRA)	21–1, 21–17	23min	Court 1
Monday, 18 August
20:50
Sachin Dias (SRI); He Bingjiao (CHN)	2-0	Bernard Ong (SIN); Thilini Hendahewa (SRI)	21–14, 21–19	26min	Court 1
21:25
Daniel Mihigo (UGA); Lole Courtois (FRA)	2-0	Abraham Ayittey (GHA); Gadde Ruthvika Shivani (IND)	walkover	0min	Court 1
Tuesday, 19 August
20:50
Bernard Ong (SIN); Thilini Hendahewa (SRI)	2-0	Daniel Mihigo (UGA); Lole Courtois (FRA)	21–6, 21–12	20min	Court 1
21:25
Sachin Dias (SRI); He Bingjiao (CHN)	2-0	Abraham Ayittey (GHA); Gadde Ruthvika Shivani (IND)	walkover	0min	Court 1

== Knockout stage ==
Quarterfinals; Wednesday, 20 August
Andraž Krapež (SLO); Alida Chen (NED)	9	20
Mek Narongrit (THA); Qin Jinjing (CHN)	21	22
Cheam June Wei (MAS); Ng Tsz Yau (HKG)	21	21
Lu Chia-hung (TPE); Lee Ying Ying (MAS)	16	19
Kanta Tsuneyama (JPN); Lee Chia-hsin (TPE)	21	21
Shi Yuqi (CHN); Joy Lai (AUS)	18	9
Anthony Sinisuka Ginting (INA); Katarina Beton (SLO)	21	17	17
Sachin Dias (SRI); He Bingjiao (CHN)	18	21	21

Semifinals; Thursday, 21 August
Mek Narongrit (THA); Qin Jinjing (CHN)	11	7
Cheam June Wei (MAS); Ng Tsz Yau (HKG)	21	21
Kanta Tsuneyama (JPN); Lee Chia-hsin (TPE)	21	7	21
Sachin Dias (SRI); He Bingjiao (CHN)	14	21	19

Final; Friday, 22 August
Cheam June Wei (MAS); Ng Tsz Yau (HKG)	21	23
Kanta Tsuneyama (JPN); Lee Chia-hsin (TPE)	14	21

Bronze Medal Match; Friday, 22 August
Mek Narongrit (THA); Qin Jinjing (CHN)	16	18
Sachin Dias (SRI); He Bingjiao (CHN)	21	21
