= Badminton at the 2014 Summer Youth Olympics – Boys' singles =

Boys' singles at the II Summer Youth Olympic Games
- Venue: Nanjing Sport Institute
- Dates: 17 – 22 August 2014
- Competitors: 32 from 31 nations

Medalists
1st place, gold medalist(s)		Shi Yuqi	China
2nd place, silver medalist(s)		Lin Guipu	China
3rd place, bronze medalist(s)		Anthony Sinisuka Ginting	Indonesia

The boys' singles badminton event at the 2014 Summer Youth Olympics were held at Nanjing Sport Institute. The 32 qualified athletes were split into 8 groups, with four players each. In their groups, they play a one-way round-robin and the first of each group qualifies to the quarterfinals, where they play a knock-out stage until the medal matches.

== Group play ==
=== Groups ===
Group A		Group B		Group C		Group D	
Seed	Athlete	Seed	Athlete	Seed	Athlete	Seed	Athlete
16; 12; 1; 30	Seo Seung-jae (KOR) Bernard Ong (SIN); Shi Yuqi (CHN); Abraham Ayittey (GHA)	7; 24; 14; 9	Max Weißkirchen (GER) Andraž Krapež (SLO); Tanguy Citron (FRA); Alex Vlaar (NED)	4; 32; 26; 21	Cheam June Wei (MAS) Dipesh Dhami (NEP); Mek Narongrit (THA); Muhammed Ali Kurt (TUR)	11; 18; 6; 19	Aditya Joshi (IND) Dragoslav Petrović (SRB); Phạm Cao Cường (VIE); Ruslan Sarsekenov (UKR)
Group E		Group F		Group G		Group H	
Seed	Athlete	Seed	Athlete	Seed	Athlete	Seed	Athlete
10; 22; 5; 31	Luís Enrique Peñalver (ESP) Krzysztof Jakowczuk (POL); Kanta Tsuneyama (JPN); Daniel Mihigo (UGA)	23; 28; 3; 29	Sachin Dias (SRI) Abdelrahman Abdelhakim (EGY); Anthony Sinisuka Ginting (INA); Devins Mananga Nzoussi (CGO)	8; 27; 15; 17	Lee Cheuk Yiu (HKG) Daniel Guda (AUS); Wolfgang Gnedt (AUT); Vladimir Shishkov (BUL)	20; 13; 2; 25	Ygor Coelho (BRA) Luis Ramón Garrido (MEX); Lin Guipu (CHN); Lu Chia-hung (TPE)

=== Results ===
Key to colours in group tables
Player advancing to knockout stage

==== Group A ====
Athlete	Matches			Sets			Points		
Athlete	W	L	Tot	W	L	Diff	W	L	Diff
Shi Yuqi (CHN)	3	0	3	6	0	+6	0	0	0
Seo Seung-jae (KOR)	2	1	3	6	2	+4	0	0	0
Bernard Ong (SIN)	1	2	3	2	4	-2	0	0	0
Abraham Ayittey (GHA)	0	3	3	0	6	-6	0	0	0

Sunday, 17 August
10:45
Seo Seung-jae (KOR)	2-0	Bernard Ong (SIN)	21–12, 21–11	31min	Court 2
15:50
Shi Yuqi (CHN)	2-0	Abraham Ayittey (GHA)	walkover	0min	Court 1
Monday, 18 August
10:10
Shi Yuqi (CHN)	2-0	Seo Seung-jae (KOR)	21–15, 21–11	39min	Court 1
15:50
Bernard Ong (SIN)	2-0	Abraham Ayittey (GHA)	walkover	0min	Court 3
Tuesday, 19 August
15:15
Shi Yuqi (CHN)	2-0	Bernard Ong (SIN)	21-9, 21-11	31min	Court 1
15:50
Seo Seung-jae (KOR)	2-0	Abraham Ayittey (GHA)	walkover	0min	Court 2

==== Group B ====
Athlete	Matches			Sets			Points		
Athlete	W	L	Tot	W	L	Diff	W	L	Diff
Max Weißkirchen (GER)	3	0	3	6	1	+5	0	0	0
Tanguy Citron (FRA)	2	1	3	5	3	+2	0	0	0
Andraž Krapež (SLO)	1	2	3	3	5	-2	0	0	0
Alex Vlaar (NED)	0	3	3	1	6	-5	0	0	0

Sunday, 17 August
09:35
Max Weißkirchen (GER)	2-0	Andraž Krapež (SLO)	21–12, 21–13	24min	Court 1
09:35
Tanguy Citron (FRA)	2-0	Alex Vlaar (NED)	21-16, 22-20	39min	Court 3
Monday, 18 August
10:45
Max Weißkirchen (GER)	2-1	Tanguy Citron (FRA)	12-21, 21–16, 21–19	52min	Court 1
10:45
Andraž Krapež (SLO)	2-1	Alex Vlaar (NED)	14-21, 21-14, 21-19	46min	Court 3
Tuesday, 19 August
09:00
Tanguy Citron (FRA)	2-1	Andraž Krapež (SLO)	19-21, 21-14, 21-17	51min	Court 2
15:50
Max Weißkirchen (GER)	2-0	Alex Vlaar (NED)	21-17, 21-12	28min	Court 3

==== Group C ====
Athlete	Matches			Sets			Points		
Athlete	W	L	Tot	W	L	Diff	W	L	Diff
Cheam June Wei (MAS)	3	0	3	6	0	+6	0	0	0
Mek Narongrit (THA)	2	1	3	4	3	+1	0	0	0
Muhammed Ali Kurt (TUR)	1	2	3	3	4	-1	0	0	0
Dipesh Dhami (NEP)	0	3	3	0	6	-6	0	0	0

Sunday, 17 August
14:40
Cheam June Wei (MAS)	2-0	Dipesh Dhami (NEP)	21–13, 21–11	27min	Court 1
14:40
Mek Narongrit (THA)	2-1	Muhammed Ali Kurt (TUR)	21-15, 10-21, 21-9	48min	Court 3
Monday, 18 August
09:35
Muhammed Ali Kurt (TUR)	2-0	Dipesh Dhami (NEP)	22–20, 21–19	36min	Court 3
13:30
Cheam June Wei (MAS)	2-0	Mek Narongrit (THA)	21-14, 21-15	37min	Court 1
Tuesday, 19 August
15:15
Mek Narongrit (THA)	2-0	Dipesh Dhami (NEP)	21-12, 21-14	24min	Court 3
15:50
Cheam June Wei (MAS)	2-0	Muhammed Ali Kurt (TUR)	21-14, 21-6	31min	Court 1

==== Group D ====
Athlete	Matches			Sets			Points		
Athlete	W	L	Tot	W	L	Diff	W	L	Diff
Aditya Joshi (IND)	3	0	3	6	0	+6	0	0	0
Phạm Cao Cường (VIE)	2	1	3	4	2	+2	0	0	0
Dragoslav Petrović (SRB)	1	2	3	2	4	-2	0	0	0
Ruslan Sarsekenov (UKR)	0	3	3	0	6	-6	0	0	0

Sunday, 17 August
10:10
Aditya Joshi (IND)	2-0	Dragoslav Petrović (SRB)	21–17, 21–16	28min	Court 2
13:30
Phạm Cao Cường (VIE)	2-0	Ruslan Sarsekenov (UKR)	21-10, 21-14	29min	Court 3
Monday, 18 August
09:00
Phạm Cao Cường (VIE)	2-0	Dragoslav Petrović (SRB)	24–22, 21–11	31min	Court 2
11:20
Aditya Joshi (IND)	2-0	Ruslan Sarsekenov (UKR)	21-14, 21-13	29min	Court 3
Tuesday, 19 August
10:10
Aditya Joshi (IND)	2-0	Phạm Cao Cường (VIE)	21-16, 21-19	42min	Court 2
10:45
Dragoslav Petrović (SRB)	2-0	Ruslan Sarsekenov (UKR)	21-15, 21-14	24min	Court 1

==== Group E ====
Athlete	Matches			Sets			Points		
Athlete	W	L	Tot	W	L	Diff	W	L	Diff
Kanta Tsuneyama (JPN)	3	0	3	6	0	+6	0	0	0
Luís Enrique Peñalver (ESP)	2	1	3	4	2	+2	0	0	0
Krzysztof Jakowczuk (POL)	1	2	3	2	4	-2	0	0	0
Daniel Mihigo (UGA)	0	4	3	0	6	-6	0	0	0

Sunday, 17 August
09:00
Luís Enrique Peñalver (ESP)	2-0	Krzysztof Jakowczuk (POL)	21–18, 21–19	31min	Court 3
15:50
Kanta Tsuneyama (JPN)	2-0	Daniel Mihigo (UGA)	21-3, 21-5	22min	Court 2
Monday, 18 August
11:20
Luís Enrique Peñalver (ESP)	2-0	Daniel Mihigo (UGA)	21–13, 21–7	23min	Court 2
15:15
Kanta Tsuneyama (JPN)	2-0	Krzysztof Jakowczuk (POL)	21-12, 21-10	31min	Court 3
Tuesday, 19 August
10:10
Kanta Tsuneyama (JPN)	2-0	Luís Enrique Peñalver (ESP)	21-7, 21-17	34min	Court 3
14:40
Krzysztof Jakowczuk (POL)	2-0	Daniel Mihigo (UGA)	21-4, 21-11	25min	Court 3

==== Group F ====
Athlete	Matches			Sets			Points		
Athlete	W	L	Tot	W	L	Diff	W	L	Diff
Anthony Sinisuka Ginting (INA)	3	0	3	6	0	+6	0	0	0
Sachin Dias (SRI)	2	1	3	4	2	+2	0	0	0
Abdelrahman Abdelhakim (EGY)	1	2	3	2	4	-2	0	0	0
Devins Mananga Nzoussi (CGO)	0	3	3	0	6	-6	0	0	0

Sunday, 17 August
11:20
Sachin Dias (SRI)	2-0	Abdelrahman Abdelhakim (EGY)	21–11, 21–9	25min	Court 2
13:30
Anthony Sinisuka Ginting (INA)	2-0	Devins Mananga Nzoussi (CGO)	21-6, 21-4	17min	Court 2
Monday, 18 August
09:35
Anthony Sinisuka Ginting (INA)	2-0	Abdelrahman Abdelhakim (EGY)	21–9, 21–11	25min	Court 1
10:10
Sachin Dias (SRI)	2-0	Devins Mananga Nzoussi (CGO)	21-5, 21-8	18min	Court 3
Tuesday, 19 August
14:05
Abdelrahman Abdelhakim (EGY)	2-0	Devins Mananga Nzoussi (CGO)	21-12, 21-10	21min	Court 3
14:40
Anthony Sinisuka Ginting (INA)	2-0	Sachin Dias (SRI)	21-10, 23-21	33min	Court 2

==== Group G ====
Athlete	Matches			Sets			Points		
Athlete	W	L	Tot	W	L	Diff	W	L	Diff
Lee Cheuk Yiu (HKG)	3	0	3	6	0	+6	0	0	0
Vladimir Shishkov (BUL)	1	2	3	3	4	-1	0	0	0
Wolfgang Gnedt (AUT)	1	2	3	3	5	-2	0	0	0
Daniel Guda (AUS)	1	2	3	2	5	-3	0	0	0

Sunday, 17 August
11:20
Lee Cheuk Yiu (HKG)	2-0	Daniel Guda (AUS)	21–12, 21–14	28min	Court 1
15:15
Wolfgang Gnedt (AUT)	2-1	Vladimir Shishkov (BUL)	21-18, 17-21, 21-7	59min	Court 3
Monday, 18 August
14:05
Daniel Guda (AUS)	2-1	Wolfgang Gnedt (AUT)	21–14, 20-22, 21–17	57min	Court 1
15:50
Lee Cheuk Yiu (HKG)	2-0	Vladimir Shishkov (BUL)	21-15, 21-12	29min	Court 2
Tuesday, 19 August
11:20
Lee Cheuk Yiu (HKG)	2-0	Wolfgang Gnedt (AUT)	21-19, 21-16	39min	Court 2
14:05
Vladimir Shishkov (BUL)	2-0	Daniel Guda (AUS)	21-18, 21-19	42min	Court 1

==== Group H ====
Athlete	Matches			Sets			Points		
Athlete	W	L	Tot	W	L	Diff	W	L	Diff
Lin Guipu (CHN)	3	0	3	6	1	+5	0	0	0
Lu Chia-hung (TPE)	2	1	3	5	2	+3	0	0	0
Ygor Coelho (BRA)	1	2	3	2	4	-2	0	0	0
Luis Ramón Garrido (MEX)	0	3	3	0	6	-6	0	0	0

Sunday, 17 August
09:00
Ygor Coelho (BRA)	2-0	Luis Ramón Garrido (MEX)	21–19, 21–16	36min	Court 1
13:30
Lin Guipu (CHN)	2-1	Lu Chia-hung (TPE)	21-15, 16-21, 21-15	64min	Court 1
Monday, 18 August
11:20
Lin Guipu (CHN)	2-0	Ygor Coelho (BRA)	21–19, 21–17	38min	Court 1
14:40
Lu Chia-hung (TPE)	2-0	Luis Ramón Garrido (MEX)	21-8, 21-12	34min	Court 3
Tuesday, 19 August
09:35
Lu Chia-hung (TPE)	2-0	Ygor Coelho (BRA)	21-14, 21-11	35min	Court 2
11:20
Lin Guipu (CHN)	2-0	Luis Ramón Garrido (MEX)	21-14, 21-14	34min	Court 3

== Knockout stage ==
Quarterfinals; Wednesday, 20 August
1	Shi Yuqi (CHN)	21	21
7	Max Weißkirchen (GER)	8	15
4	Cheam June Wei (MAS)	22	18	12
11	Aditya Joshi (IND)	20	21	21
5	Kanta Tsuneyama (JPN)	8	21	12
3	Anthony Sinisuka Ginting (INA)	21	14	21
8	Lee Cheuk Yiu (HKG)	18	16
2	Lin Guipu (CHN)	21	21

Semifinals; Thursday, 21 August
1	Shi Yuqi (CHN)	21	24
11	Aditya Joshi (IND)	10	22
3	Anthony Sinisuka Ginting (INA)	21	19	17
2	Lin Guipu (CHN)	19	21	21

Final; Friday, 22 August
1	Shi Yuqi (CHN)	21	21
2	Lin Guipu (CHN)	15	19

Bronze Medal Match; Friday, 22 August
11	Aditya Joshi (IND)	17	16
3	Anthony Sinisuka Ginting (INA)	21	21
