= Malaysia at the 2014 Summer Youth Olympics =

- IOC code: MAS
- NOC: Olympic Council of Malaysia
- Website: www.olympic.org.my (in English)

in Nanjing
- Competitors: 20 in 11 sports
- Flag bearer: Lim Ching Hwang (Opening)
- Medals Ranked 64th: Gold 0 Silver 1 Bronze 1 Total 2

Summer Youth Olympics appearances (overview)
- 2010; 2014; 2018; 2026

Malaysia competed at the 2014 Summer Youth Olympics, in Nanjing, China from 16 to 28 August 2014.

On 22 August 2014, Cheam June Wei became the first Malaysian to win a Youth Olympic gold medal when he won the badminton mixed doubles gold with Hong Kong's Ng Tsz Yau as his partner. Also, National men archer Mohd Zarif Syahiir won silver in archery mixed team medal with Germany's Cynthia Freywald at the Youth Olympic Games in Nanjing. However both gold and silver was not credited to the individual nation's medal tally as the event was a mixed-National Olympic Committees event in which athletes from different nations team up to compete under the Olympic flag. National woman diver Loh Zhiayi won a silver and bronze medal in the 10m platform individual event and women's 3m springboard event at the Youth Olympic Games 2014.

== Medalists ==
Medals awarded to participants of mixed-NOC teams are represented in italics. These medals are not included towards the individual NOC medal tally.

Medal	Name	Sport	Event	Date
Silver	Loh Zhiayi	Diving	Girls' 10 metre platform	23 August
Bronze	Loh Zhiayi	Diving	Girls' 3 metre springboard	25 August

== Archery ==
Malaysia qualified a male archer from its performance at the 2013 World Archery Youth Championships.

Individual

Athlete	Event	Ranking round		Round of 32	Round of 16	Quarterfinals	Semifinals	Final / BM	Rank
Athlete	Event	Score	Seed	Opposition Score	Opposition Score	Opposition Score	Opposition Score	Opposition Score	Rank
Muhamad Zarif Syahiir Zolkepeli	Boys' individual	654	17 Q	Boris Balaz (SVK); W 6–2 (28–26, 28–26, 25–30, 29–25)	Lee Woo-seok (KOR); L 0–6 (25–29, 26–28, 23–29)	did not advance			=9

Team

Athletes	Event	Ranking round		Round of 32	Round of 16	Quarterfinals	Semifinals	Final / BM	Rank
Athletes	Event	Score	Seed	Opposition Score	Opposition Score	Opposition Score	Opposition Score	Opposition Score	Rank
Muhamad Zarif Syahiir Zolkepeli (MAS); Cynthia Freywald (GER)	Mixed team	1284	15 Q	Luis Tapia (MEX); Rosangel Sainz (CUB); W 5–3 (38–37, 33–38, 38–33, 36–36)	Andreas Mayr (GER); Lucy Tatafu (TGA); W 5–4 (36–39, 37–33, 38–36, 36–38, T19–T17)	Bradley Denny (GBR); Miasa Koike (JPN); W 5–4 (36–38, 33–32, 36–35, 28–35, T19–T17)	Rick Martens (BEL); Regina Romero (GUA); W 6–2 (36–34, 33–34, 34–32, 36–33)	Luis Gabriel Moreno (PHI); Li Jiaman (CHN); L 0–6 (37–38, 35–38, 33–37)	2nd place, silver medalist(s)

== Athletics ==
Malaysia qualified three athletes.

Qualification Legend: Q=Final A (medal); qB=Final B (non-medal); qC=Final C (non-medal); qD=Final D (non-medal); qE=Final E (non-medal)

Boys
Track event

Athlete	Event	Heats		Final	
Athlete	Event	Result	Rank	Result	Rank
Mohd Rizzua Muhamad	110 m hurdles	DSQ qC		13.90	12

Field event

Athlete	Event	Qualification		Final	
Athlete	Event	Result	Rank	Result	Rank
Norshafiee Mohd Shah	High jump	2.03	12 qB	2.02	13

Girls
Field event

Athlete	Event	Qualification		Final	
Athlete	Event	Distance	Rank	Distance	Rank
Kirthana Ramasamy	Triple jump	12.49	6 Q	12.64	5

== Badminton ==
Malaysia qualified two athletes based on 2 May 2014 BWF Junior World Rankings.

On 22 August 2014, Cheam June Wei won the mixed doubles gold medal with Hong Kong's Ng Tsz Yau as his partner. They defeated Kanta Tsuneyama of Japan and Lee Chia-hsin of Taiwan in the finals which lasted 30 minutes. The gold however, was not credited to Malaysia or Hong Kong in the overall medal tally as it was a mixed-NOCs event in which athletes from different nations team up to compete under the Olympic flag.

Singles

Athlete	Event	Group stage				Quarterfinal	Semifinal	Final / BM	Rank
Athlete	Event	Opposition Score	Opposition Score	Opposition Score	Rank	Opposition Score	Opposition Score	Opposition Score	Rank
Cheam June Wei	Boys' singles	D Dhami (NEP) W 2–0 (21–13, 21–11)	M Narongrit (THA) W 2–0 (21–14, 21–15)	M A Kurt (TUR) W 2–0 (21–14, 21–6)	1 Q	A Joshi (IND) L 1–2 (22–20, 18–21, 12–21)	Did not advance		=5
Lee Ying Ying	Girls' singles	L Janine (AUT) W 2–0 (21–13, 21–6)	K Beton (SLO) W 2–0 (21–14, 21–10)	He BJ (CHN) L 0–2 (18–21, 14–21)	2	Did not advance			=9

Doubles

Athlete	Event	Group stage				Quarterfinal	Semifinal	Final / BM	Rank
Athlete	Event	Opposition Score	Opposition Score	Opposition Score	Rank	Opposition Score	Opposition Score	Opposition Score	Rank
Cheam June Wei (MAS); Ng Tsz Yau (HKG)	Mixed doubles	W Gnedt (AUT); S Solis (MEX) W 2–0 (21–12, 21–9)	T Citron (FRA); D Macias (PER) W 2–0 (21–9, 21–8)	Lin GP (CHN); Kim G-e (KOR) W 2–0 (22–20, 21–19)	1 Q	Lu C-h (TPE); Lee Y Y (MAS) W 2–0 (21–16, 21–19)	M Narongrit (THA); Qin JJ (CHN) W 2–0 (21–12, 21–9)	K Tsuneyama (JPN); Lee C-h (TPE) W 2–0 (21–14, 23–21)	1st place, gold medalist(s)
Lu Chia-hung (TPE); Lee Ying Ying (MAS)	Mixed doubles	Pham C C (VIE); A Demirbag (TUR) W 2–1 (19–21, 21–9, 21–17)	D Petrovic (SRB); Liang XY (SIN) W 2–1 (21–18, 7–21, 21–7)	L R Garrido (MEX); K Kuuba (EST) W 2–0 (21–17, 21–18)	1 Q	Cheam J W (MAS); Ng T Y (HKG) L 0–2 (16–21, 19–21)	Did not advance		=5

== Diving ==
Malaysia qualified two quotas based on its performance at the Nanjing 2014 Diving Qualifying Event.

Athlete	Event	Preliminary		Final	
Athlete	Event	Points	Rank	Points	Rank
Loh Zhiayi	Girls' 3 m springboard	429.40	3 Q	446.70	3rd place, bronze medalist(s)
Loh Zhiayi	10 m platform	449.35	2 Q	450.65	2nd place, silver medalist(s)
Loh Zhiayi (MAS); Alexis Jandard (FRA)	Mixed team	—N/a		318.20	7

== Equestrian ==
Malaysia qualified a rider.

Athlete	Horse	Event	Round 1		Round 2		Total	
Athlete	Horse	Event	Penalties	Rank	Penalties	Rank	Penalties	Rank
Praveen Nair Mathavan	Arkansas	Individual jumping	8	=16	4	=5	12	=10
Australasia; Jake Hunter (AUS); Lennard Chiang (HKG); Sarrd Kalantari (IRI); Praveen Nair Mathavan (MAS); Emily Fraser (NZL)	For The Star; DJ; Cristallo; Arkansas; Exilio	Team jumping	12	=4	8	5	20	5

== Golf ==
Malaysia qualified two athletes based on 8 June 2014 IGF World Amateur Golf Rankings.

Individual

Athlete	Event	Round 1		Round 2		Round 3		Total	
Athlete	Event	Score	Rank	Score	Rank	Score	Rank	Score	Rank
Low Khai Jei	Boys	71	15	74	18	73	16	218	18
Kan Kah Yan	Girls	79	26	74	12	76	18	229	22

Team

Athletes	Event	Round 1 (Foursome)		Round 2 (Fourball)		Round 3 (Individual Stroke)				Total	
Athletes	Event	Score	Rank	Score	Rank	Boy	Girl	Total	Rank	Score	Rank
Low Khai Jei; Kan Kah Yan	Mixed	69	=17	76	23	71	77	148	19	293	22

== Gymnastics ==
=== Artistic ===
Malaysia qualified one athlete based on its performance at the 2014 Asian Artistic Gymnastics Championships.

Boys

Athlete	Event	Apparatus						Total	Rank
Athlete	Event	F Rank	PH Rank	R Rank	V Rank	PB Rank	HB Rank	Total	Rank
Jeremiah Loo Phay Xing	Qualification	13.150; 18	13.500; 9 Q	11.500; 30	12.800; DNF	13.575; 6 Q	12.500; 20	77.025	16 Q
Jeremiah Loo Phay Xing	Individual all-around	12.950; 17	12.300; 15	11.625; 17	13.000; 17	12.650; 15	12.000; 15	74.525	18
Jeremiah Loo Phay Xing	Pommel horse	—N/a	12.866; 8	—N/a				12.866	8
Jeremiah Loo Phay Xing	Parallel bars	—N/a				13.366; 7	—N/a	13.366	7

=== Rhythmic ===
Malaysia qualified one athlete based on its performance at the 2014 Asian Rhythmic Championships.

Individual

Athlete	Event	Qualification						Final					
Athlete	Event	Hoop Rank	Ball Rank	Clubs Rank	Ribbon Rank	Total	Rank	Hoop Rank	Ball Rank	Clubs Rank	Ribbon Rank	Total	Rank
Olivia Tai Qing Tong	Individual all-around	13.500; 7	11.850; 13	12.800; 9	12.075; 13	50.225	10	did not advance					

== Sailing ==
Malaysia qualified two boats based on its performance at the Byte CII Asian Continental Qualifier.

Athlete	Event	Race											Net Points	Final Rank
Athlete	Event	1	2	3	4	5	6	7	8	9	10	M	Net Points	Final Rank
Asri Azman	Boys' Byte CII	~~31~~; DSQ	1	31; DNE	7	2	8	10	Cancelled			1	60	8
Nur Shazrin Mohamad Latif	Girls' Byte CII	13	13	~~16~~	11	5	5	5	Cancelled			8	60	6

== Shooting ==
Malaysia was given a wild card to compete.

Individual

Athlete	Event	Qualification		Final	
Athlete	Event	Points	Rank	Points	Rank
Abdul Hadi Abd Malek	Boys' 10 m air pistol	558	12	did not advance	

Team

Athletes	Event	Qualification		Round of 16	Quarterfinals	Semifinals	Final / BM	Rank
Athletes	Event	Points	Rank	Opposition Result	Opposition Result	Opposition Result	Opposition Result	Rank
Abdul Hadi Abd Malek (MAS); Alejandra Cervantes Rodriguez (MEX)	Mixed teams' 10 m air pistol	735	17	did not advance				

== Swimming ==
Malaysia qualified four swimmers.

Boys

Athlete	Event	Heat		Semifinal		Final	
Athlete	Event	Time	Rank	Time	Rank	Time	Rank
Lim Ching Hwang	50 m freestyle	24.26	28	did not advance			
Lim Ching Hwang	100 m freestyle	51.64	19	did not advance			
Lim Ching Hwang	200 m freestyle	1:51.49	10	—N/a		did not advance	
Lim Ching Hwang	50 m breaststroke	30.63	34	did not advance			
Welson Sim	200 m freestyle	1:51.99	13	—N/a		did not advance	
Welson Sim	400 m freestyle	3:55.72	11	—N/a		did not advance	
Welson Sim	800 m freestyle	—N/a				8:15.84	15

Girls

Athlete	Event	Heat		Semifinal		Final	
Athlete	Event	Time	Rank	Time	Rank	Time	Rank
Angela Chieng	400 m freestyle	4:26.11	21	—N/a		did not advance	
Angela Chieng	800 m freestyle	—N/a				9:00.61	17
Yap Siew Hui	50 m butterfly	28.50	22	did not advance			
Yap Siew Hui	100 m butterfly	1:02.96	19	did not advance			

== Taekwondo ==
Malaysia qualified one athlete based on its performance at the Taekwondo Qualification Tournament.

Girls

Athlete	Event	Round of 16	Quarterfinals	Semifinals	Final	Rank
Athlete	Event	Opposition Result	Opposition Result	Opposition Result	Opposition Result	Rank
Mohana Mariappen	−63 kg	Bye	Yopasa (COL); L 1 – 15(PTG)	did not advance		5
