= Bulgaria at the 2014 Summer Youth Olympics =

- IOC code: BUL
- NOC: Bulgarian Olympic Committee
- Website: www.bgolympic.org

in Nanjing
- Competitors: 27 in 13 sports
- Medals Ranked 26th: Gold 2 Silver 4 Bronze 0 Total 6

Summer Youth Olympics appearances (overview)
- 2010; 2014; 2018; 2026

Bulgaria competed at the 2014 Summer Youth Olympics, in Nanjing, China from 16 August to 28 August 2014.

== Medalists ==
Medals awarded to participants of mixed-NOC (Combined) teams are represented in italics. These medals are not counted towards the individual NOC medal tally.

Medal	Name	Sport	Event	Date
Gold	Bozhidar Andreev	Weightlifting	Boys' −69 kg	19 August
Gold	Lidia Nencheva	Shooting	Mixed Team 10m Air Pistol	21 August
Gold	Blagoy Naydenov	Boxing	Boys' -81 kg	27 August
Silver	Betina Temelkova	Judo	Girls' -52 kg	18 August
Silver	Kiril Milov	Wrestling	Boys' Greco-Roman -85kg	25 August
Silver	Dushko Mihaylov	Boxing	Boys' -56 kg	27 August
Silver	Elena Bineva; Aleksandra Mitrovich; Emiliya Radicheva; Sofiya Rangelova; Gabriela Stefanova	Gymnastics	Girls' Rhythmic Group All-Around	27 August

== Archery ==
Bulgaria qualified a male and a female archer from its performance at the 2013 World Archery Youth Championships.

Individual

Athlete	Event	Ranking round		Round of 32	Round of 16	Quarterfinals	Semifinals	Final / BM	Rank
Athlete	Event	Score	Seed	Opposition Score	Opposition Score	Opposition Score	Opposition Score	Opposition Score	Rank
Damyan Dachev	Boys' Individual	646	21	Gazoz (TUR); L 5–6	did not advance				17
Ralitsa Gencheva	Girls' Individual	615	24	Anagoz (TUR); L 0–6	did not advance				17

Team

Athletes	Event	Ranking round		Round of 32	Round of 16	Quarterfinals	Semifinals	Final / BM	Rank
Athletes	Event	Score	Seed	Opposition Score	Opposition Score	Opposition Score	Opposition Score	Opposition Score	Rank
Damyan Dachev (BUL); Hema Latha Boda (IND)	Mixed Team	1286	13	Anagoz (TUR); Purnama (INA); W 5-4	Abdrazak (KAZ); D'Almeida (BRA); L 2-6	did not advance			9
Florian Faber (SUI); Ralitsa Gencheva (BUL)	Mixed Team	1291	4	Abdrazak (KAZ); D'Almeida (BRA); L 0-6	did not advance				17

== Athletics ==
Bulgaria qualified one athlete.

Qualification Legend: Q=Final A (medal); qB=Final B (non-medal); qC=Final C (non-medal); qD=Final D (non-medal); qE=Final E (non-medal)

Boys
Track & road events

Athlete	Event	Heats		Final	
Athlete	Event	Result	Rank	Result	Rank
Ivo Balabanov	2000 m steeplechase	5:45.87	8 Q	5:49.64	7

== Badminton ==
Bulgaria qualified two athletes based on the 2 May 2014 BWF Junior World Rankings.

Singles

Athlete	Event	Group stage				Quarterfinal	Semifinal	Final / BM	Rank
Athlete	Event	Opposition Score	Opposition Score	Opposition Score	Rank	Opposition Score	Opposition Score	Opposition Score	Rank
Vladimir Shishkov	Boys' Singles	Gnedt (AUT); L 21–18, 17–21, 21-7	Lee (HKG); L 21–15, 21-12	Guda (AUS); W 21–18, 21-19	2	did not advance			
Maria Mitsova	Girls' Singles	Kuuba (EST); W 21–11, 21–15	Ng (HKG); L 21–18, 24–22	Heim (GER); L 21–17, 21-13	3	did not advance			

Doubles

Athlete	Event	Group stage				Quarterfinal	Semifinal	Final / BM	Rank
Athlete	Event	Opposition Score	Opposition Score	Opposition Score	Rank	Opposition Score	Opposition Score	Opposition Score	Rank
Luise Heim (GER); Vladimir Shishkov (BUL)	Mixed Doubles	Kurt (TUR); Pavlinic (CRO); L 18–21, 7–21	Weisskirchen (GER); Ishaak (SUR); L 18–21, 18–21	Ginting (INA); Beton (SLO); L 19–21, 9–21	4	did not advance			25
Maria Mitsova (BUL); Adbelrahman Abdelhakim (EGY)	Mixed Doubles	Krapež (SLO); Chen (NED); L 13–21, 10-21	Sarsekenov (UKR); Yamaguchi (JPN); L 13–21, 16-21	Joshi (IND); Kabelo (BOT); L 22–20, 18–21, 11-21	4	did not advance			25

== Boxing ==
Bulgaria qualified three boxers based on its performance at the 2014 AIBA Youth World Championships

Boys

Athlete	Event	Preliminaries	Semifinals	Final / RM	Rank
Athlete	Event	Opposition Result	Opposition Result	Opposition Result	Rank
Daniel Asenov	-52 kg	Stevenson (USA); L 0–3	Did not advance	Bout for 5th Place Yusifzada (AZE); W w/o	5
Dushko Mihaylov	-56 kg	Bye	Salem (ALG); W 2–0	Ibañez (CUB); L 0-3	2nd place, silver medalist(s)
Blagoy Naydenov	-81 kg	Bye	Riley (GBR); W 3-0	Kazakov (KAZ); W 3-0	1st place, gold medalist(s)

== Gymnastics ==
=== Artistic Gymnastics ===
Bulgaria qualified one athlete based on its performance at the 2014 European MAG Championships.

Boys

Athlete	Event	Apparatus						Total	Rank
Athlete	Event	F	PH	R	V	PB	HB	Total	Rank
Vladimir Tushev	Qualification	12.850 24	12.600 19	13.950 2 Q	13.300 30	12.675 18	11.300 33	76.675	18 Q
Vladimir Tushev	All-Around	12.600	10.650	13.600	13.400	13.400	11.000	74.650	17
Vladimir Tushev	Rings	—N/a						13.500	4

=== Rhythmic Gymnastics ===
Bulgaria qualified one individual and one team based on its performance at the 2014 Rhythmic Gymnastics Grand Prix in Moscow.

Individual

Athlete	Event	Qualification						Final					
Athlete	Event	Hoop	Ball	Clubs	Ribbon	Total	Rank	Hoop	Ball	Clubs	Ribbon	Total	Rank
Katerina Marinova	Individual	13.475	12.475	12.600	13.000	51.550	9 R	did not advance					

Team

Athletes	Event	Qualification				Final			
Athletes	Event	4 Hoops	4 Ribbons	Total	Rank	4 Hoops	4 Ribbons	Total	Rank
Elena Bineva; Aleksandra Mitrovich; Emiliya Radicheva; Sofiya Rangelova; Gabriela Stefanova	Team	14.450	14.750	29.200	2 Q	13.700	13.350	27.050	2nd place, silver medalist(s)

Notes: Q=Qualified to Final; R=Reserve

== Judo ==
Bulgaria qualified two athletes based on its performance at the 2013 Cadet World Judo Championships.

Individual

Athlete	Event	Round of 32	Round of 16	Quarterfinals	Semifinals	Rep 1	Rep 2	Rep 3	Rep 4	Final / BM	Rank
Athlete	Event	Opposition Result	Opposition Result	Opposition Result	Opposition Result	Opposition Result	Opposition Result	Opposition Result	Opposition Result	Opposition Result	Rank
Stoyan Tarapanov	Boys' -66 kg	—N/a	Tursunov (UZB); L 000-100	did not advance		Bye	Dermishyan (ARM); L 000-110	did not advance			11
Betina Temelkova	Girls' -52 kg	—N/a	Gamarra (PER); W 101-000	Amrane (ALG); W 000-000	Štangar (SLO); W 002-000	—N/a				Colman (BRA); L 000-100	2nd place, silver medalist(s)

Team

Athletes	Event	Round of 16	Quarterfinals	Semifinals	Final	Rank
Athletes	Event	Opposition Result	Opposition Result	Opposition Result	Opposition Result	Rank
Team Kano; Melisa Çakmaklı (TUR); Salim Darukhi (TJK); Mariam Janashvili (GEO); Arso Milic (MNE); Gavin Mogopa (BOT); Elvismar Rodriguez (VEN); Stoyan Tarapanov (BUL); Tea Tintor (SRB)	Mixed Team	Team Rouge (MIX); L 2 – 5	did not advance			9
Team Ruska; Sadjia Amrane (ALG); Jose Basile (BRA); Harutyun Dermishyan (ARM); Szabina Gercsák (HUN); Lovro Kovac (CRO); Kamila Pasternak (POL); Julian Sancho (CRC); Betina Temelkova (BUL)	Mixed Team	Bye	Team Rouge (MIX); L 2 – 5	did not advance		5

== Modern Pentathlon ==
Bulgaria qualified one athlete based on the 1 June 2014 Olympic Youth A Pentathlon World Rankings.

Athlete	Event	Fencing (épée one touch)			Swimming (200 m freestyle)			Combined: shooting/running (10 m air pistol)/(3000 m)			Total points	Final rank
Athlete	Event	Results	Rank	Points	Time	Rank	Points	Time	Rank	Points	Total points	Final rank
Yavor Peshleevski	Boys' Individual		1	266							1143	5
Unknown; Yavor Peshleevski (BUL)	Mixed Relay											

== Rowing ==
Bulgaria qualified one boat based on its performance at the 2013 World Rowing Junior Championships.

Athlete	Event	Heats		Repechage		Semifinals		Final	
Athlete	Event	Time	Rank	Time	Rank	Time	Rank	Time	Rank
Desislava Georgieva	Girls' Single Sculls						FA	3:59.62	5

Qualification Legend: FA=Final A (medal); FB=Final B (non-medal); FC=Final C (non-medal); FD=Final D (non-medal); SA/B=Semifinals A/B; SC/D=Semifinals C/D; R=Repechage

== Sailing ==
Bulgaria was given a reallocation boat based on being a top ranked nation not yet qualified.

Athlete	Event	Race											Net Points	Final Rank
Athlete	Event	1	2	3	4	5	6	7	8	9	10	M*	Net Points	Final Rank
Viktoriya Hinkovska	Girls' Byte CII	23	15	(24)	18	9	23	14	18	Cancelled		144.00	120.00	20

== Shooting ==
Bulgaria qualified two shooters based on its performance at the 2014 European Shooting Championships.

Individual

Athlete	Event	Qualification		Final	
Athlete	Event	Points	Rank	Points	Rank
Aleksandar Todorov	Boys' 10m Air Pistol	572	4 Q	156.0	4
Lidia Nencheva	Girls' 10m Air Pistol	362	15	did not advance	

Team

Athletes	Event	Qualification		Round of 16	Quarterfinals	Semifinals	Final / BM	Rank
Athletes	Event	Points	Rank	Opposition Result	Opposition Result	Opposition Result	Opposition Result	Rank
Aleksandar Todorov (BUL); Elise Downing (AUS)	Mixed Team 10m Air Pistol		Q	Korostylov (UKR); Shafqat (PAK); W	Mohamed (EGY); Xiu (SIN); L	did not advance		5
Lidia Nencheva (BUL); Vladimir Svechnikov (UZB)	Mixed Team 10m Air Pistol		Q	W	Deswal (IND); Ceper (SLO); W 10 - 5	Chung (TPE); Igityan (ARM); W 10 - 8	Teh (SIN); Mohamed (EGY); W 10 - 5	1st place, gold medalist(s)

== Swimming ==
Bulgaria qualified two swimmers.

Boys

Athlete	Event	Heat		Semifinal		Final	
Athlete	Event	Time	Rank	Time	Rank	Time	Rank
Danail Slavchev	50 m backstroke	26.87	21	did not advance			
Danail Slavchev	100 m backstroke	58.91	30	did not advance			

Girls

Athlete	Event	Heat		Semifinal		Final	
Athlete	Event	Time	Rank	Time	Rank	Time	Rank
Georgiya Kadoglu	50 m breaststroke	34.35	26	did not advance			
Georgiya Kadoglu	200 m breaststroke	2:34.45	11	—N/a		did not advance	
Georgiya Kadoglu	200 m individual medley	2:20.40	15	—N/a		did not advance	

== Weightlifting ==
Bulgaria qualified 1 quota in the boys' and girls' events based on the team ranking after the 2014 Weightlifting Youth European Championships.

Boys

Athlete	Event	Snatch		Clean & jerk		Total	Rank
Athlete	Event	Result	Rank	Result	Rank	Total	Rank
Bozhidar Andreev	−69 kg	133	2	167	1	300	1st place, gold medalist(s)

Girls

Athlete	Event	Snatch		Clean & jerk		Total	Rank
Athlete	Event	Result	Rank	Result	Rank	Total	Rank
Vanya Luhova	−58 kg	NL		DNF		---	---

== Wrestling ==
Bulgaria qualified one athlete based on its performance at the 2014 European Cadet Championships.

Key:
- VT - Victory by Fall.
- PP - Decision by Points - the loser with technical points.
- PO - Decision by Points - the loser without technical points.

Boys

Athlete	Event	Group stage				Final / RM	Rank
Athlete	Event	Opposition Score	Opposition Score	Opposition Score	Rank	Opposition Score	Rank
Kiril Milov	Greco-Roman -85kg	Kalaba (SRB); W 4-0 ^{ST}	Ahmed (EGY); W 4-0 ^{ST}	Pal (IND); W 4-1 ^{ST}	1 Q	Bemalian (RUS); L 1-3 ^{PP}	2nd place, silver medalist(s)
