= Turkey at the 2014 Summer Youth Olympics =

- IOC code: TUR
- NOC: Turkish Olympic Committee
- Website: www.olimpiyatkomitesi.org.tr

in Nanjing
- Competitors: 41 in 16 sports
- Flag bearer: İlke Özyüksel
- Medals Ranked 39th: Gold 1 Silver 3 Bronze 6 Total 10

Summer Youth Olympics appearances (overview)
- 2010; 2014; 2018; 2026

Turkey competed at the 2014 Summer Youth Olympics, in Nanjing, China from 16 August to 28 August 2014.

== Medal summary ==
=== Medal table ===
| Sport | Gold | Silver | Bronze | Total |
|---|---|---|---|---|
| Boxing | 0 | 0 | 2 | 2 |
| Judo | 1 | 0 | 1 | 2 |
| Rowing | 0 | 0 | 1 | 1 |
| Taekwondo | 0 | 1 | 1 | 2 |
| Wrestling | 0 | 2 | 1 | 3 |
| Total (no mixed-NOCs medals) | 1 | 3 | 6 | 10 |

=== Medalists ===
| Medal | Name | Sport | Event |
|---|---|---|---|
| Gold | Melisa Çakmaklı | Judo | Girls' -44 kg |
| Silver | Fatma Sarıdoğan | Taekwondo | Girls' −55 kg |
| Silver | Fatih Aslan | Wrestling | Boys' Greco-Roman -42kg |
| Silver | Tuğba Kılıç | Wrestling | Girls' Freestyle -70kg |
| Bronze | Adem Furkan Avcı | Boxing | Boys' -64 kg |
| Bronze | Neriman Istık | Boxing | Girls' -51 kg |
| Bronze | Oğuzhan Karaca | Judo | Boys' -55 kg |
| Bronze | Eren Can Aslan; Gökhan Güven | Rowing | Boys' Pairs |
| Bronze | Talha Bayram | Taekwondo | Boys' +73 kg |
| Bronze | Cabbar Duyum | Wrestling | Boys' Freestyle -46kg |

== Archery ==
Turkey qualified two archers based on its performance at the 2013 World Archery Youth Championships.

Individual

| Athlete | Event | Ranking round | | Round of 32 | Round of 16 | Quarterfinals | Semifinals | Final / BM | Rank |
| Athlete | Event | Score | Seed | Opposition Score | Opposition Score | Opposition Score | Opposition Score | Opposition Score | Rank |
|---|---|---|---|---|---|---|---|---|---|
| Mete Gazoz | Boys' Individual | 667 | 12 | Dachev (BUL); W 6–5 | Tapia (MEX); W 7–3 | van Tongeren (NED); W 6–2 | Lee (KOR); L 0–6 | Verma (IND); L 4–6 | 4 |
| Yasemin Ecem Anagöz | Girls' Individual | 646 | 9 | Gencheva (BUL); W 6–0 | Giaccheri (ITA); W 6–2 | Lee (KOR); L 3–7 | Did not advance | | 6 |

Team

| Athletes | Event | Ranking round | | Round of 32 | Round of 16 | Quarterfinals | Semifinals | Final / BM | Rank |
| Athletes | Event | Score | Seed | Opposition Score | Opposition Score | Opposition Score | Opposition Score | Opposition Score | Rank |
|---|---|---|---|---|---|---|---|---|---|
| Mete Gazoz (TUR); Maya Raysin (ISR) | Mixed Team | 1287 | 11 | Komar (UKR); Zyzanska (POL); W 5-4 | Han (TPE); Kazanskaya (BLR); L 4-5 | Did not advance | | | 9 |
| Yasemin Ecem Anagöz (TUR); Hendra Purnama (INA) | Mixed Team | 1279 | 20 | Boda (IND); Dachev (BUL); L 4-5 | Did not advance | | | | 17 |

== Athletics ==
Turkey qualified nine athletes.

Qualification Legend: Q=Final A (medal); qB=Final B (non-medal); qC=Final C (non-medal); qD=Final D (non-medal); qE=Final E (non-medal)

Boys
Track & road events

| Athlete | Event | Heats | | Final | |
| Athlete | Event | Result | Rank | Result | Rank |
|---|---|---|---|---|---|
| Omer Oti | 1500 m | 3:52.36 | 11 qB | 3:53.46 | 10 |

Field Events

| Athlete | Event | Qualification | | Final | |
| Athlete | Event | Distance | Rank | Distance | Rank |
|---|---|---|---|---|---|
| Seyhmus Yigitalp | Long jump | 7.18 | 5 Q | 7.19 | 6 |
| Alperen Acet | High jump | 2.07 | 9 qB | DNS | |
| Oguzhan Özdayi | Shot put | 19.92 PB | 13 qB | 16.78 | 15 |
| Emin Öncel | Javelin throw | 77.55 PB | 2 Q | 69.28 | 6 |

Girls
Field events

| Athlete | Event | Qualification | | Final | |
| Athlete | Event | Distance | Rank | Distance | Rank |
|---|---|---|---|---|---|
| Gamze Simsek | Triple jump | DNS | | Did not advance | |
| Elif Tas | Shot put | 14.82 | 12 qB | 14.40 | 13 |
| Eda Tuğsuz | Javelin throw | 47.75 | 10 qB | 48.48 | 12 |
| Deniz Yaylaci | Hammer throw | 62.31 | 6 Q | 62.67 | 5 |

== Badminton ==
Turkey qualified two athletes based on the 2 May 2014 BWF Junior World Rankings.

Singles

| Athlete | Event | Group stage | | | | Quarterfinal | Semifinal | Final / BM | Rank |
| Athlete | Event | Opposition Score | Opposition Score | Opposition Score | Rank | Opposition Score | Opposition Score | Opposition Score | Rank |
|---|---|---|---|---|---|---|---|---|---|
| Muhammed Ali Kurt | Boys' Singles | Narongrit (THA); L 1-2 | Dhami (NEP); W 2-0 | Cheam (MAS); L 0-2 | 3 | did not advance | | | |
| Aliye Demirbağ | Girls' Singles | Kim (KOR); L 0-2 | Kabelo (BOT); W 2-0 | Liang (SIN); L 0-2 | 3 | did not advance | | | |

Doubles

| Athlete | Event | Group stage | | | | Quarterfinal | Semifinal | Final / BM | Rank |
| Athlete | Event | Opposition Score | Opposition Score | Opposition Score | Rank | Opposition Score | Opposition Score | Opposition Score | Rank |
|---|---|---|---|---|---|---|---|---|---|
| Maja Pavlinic (CRO); Muhammed Ali Kurt (TUR) | Mixed Doubles | Shishkov (BUL); Heim (GER); W 2-0 | Ginting (INA); Beton (SLO); L 0-2 | Weisskirchen (GER); Ishaak (SUR); W 2-0 | 2 | did not advance | | | |
| Aliye Demirbağ (TUR); Cao Cuong Pham (VIE) | Mixed Doubles | Lu (TPE); Lee (MAS); L 1-2 | Garrido (MEX); Kuuba (EST); L 1-2 | Petrovic (SRB); Liang (SIN); W 2-1 | 4 | did not advance | | | |

== Beach volleyball ==
Turkey qualified a girls' team from their performance at the 2014 CEV Youth Continental Cup Final.

| Athletes | Event | Preliminary round | Standing | Round of 24 | Round of 16 | Quarterfinals | Semifinals | Final / BM | Rank |
| Athletes | Event | Opposition Score | Standing | Opposition Score | Opposition Score | Opposition Score | Opposition Score | Opposition Score | Rank |
|---|---|---|---|---|---|---|---|---|---|
| Esra Betül Çetin; Selin Yurtsever | Girls' | Pan/Song (TPE) | 2 Q | Bye | Hiruela/Verasio (ARG); L 0 - 2 | Did not advance | | | 17 |
| Esra Betül Çetin; Selin Yurtsever | Girls' | Fortunati/Rotti (URU) | 2 Q | Bye | Hiruela/Verasio (ARG); L 0 - 2 | Did not advance | | | 17 |
| Esra Betül Çetin; Selin Yurtsever | Girls' | Bitrus/Audu (NGR); W w/o | 2 Q | Bye | Hiruela/Verasio (ARG); L 0 - 2 | Did not advance | | | 17 |
| Esra Betül Çetin; Selin Yurtsever | Girls' | Mondesir/Noel (LCA); W 2 – 0 | 2 Q | Bye | Hiruela/Verasio (ARG); L 0 - 2 | Did not advance | | | 17 |
| Esra Betül Çetin; Selin Yurtsever | Girls' | Eti/Sakalia (TUV); W 2 – 0 | 2 Q | Bye | Hiruela/Verasio (ARG); L 0 - 2 | Did not advance | | | 17 |

== Boxing ==
Turkey qualified five boxers based on its performance at the 2014 AIBA Youth World Championships.

Boys

| Athlete | Event | Preliminaries | Semifinals | Final / RM | Rank |
| Athlete | Event | Opposition Result | Opposition Result | Opposition Result | Rank |
|---|---|---|---|---|---|
| Mert Karakılıç | -49 kg | Aikhynbay (KAZ); L 0-3 | Did not advance | Bout for 5th place Kakara (IND); L 0-3 | 6 |
| Adem Furkan Avcı | -64 kg | Tóth (HUN); W 3-0 | Arecchia (ITA); L 0-3 | Bronze medal Bout Tumenov (RUS); W 2-1 | 3rd place, bronze medalist(s) |
| Mehmet Ufuk Tekneci | -81 kg | Manasyan (ARM); L 0-3 | Did not advance | Bout for 5th place Tregren (NOR); W 2-1 | 5 |

Girls

| Athlete | Event | Preliminaries | Semifinals | Final / RM | Rank |
| Athlete | Event | Opposition Result | Opposition Result | Opposition Result | Rank |
|---|---|---|---|---|---|
| Neriman Istık | -51 kg | Bye | Testa (ITA); L 0–3 | Bronze medal Bout Grigoryan (ARM); W 2–1 | 3rd place, bronze medalist(s) |
| Esra Yıldız | -60 kg | Bondarenko (UKR); W 2-1 | Ginty (IRL); L 0-2 | Bronze medal Bout Alexiusson (SWE); L 0-3 | 4 |

== Fencing ==
Turkey qualified one athlete based on its performance at the 2014 FIE Cadet World Championships.

Girls

| Athlete | Event | Pool Round | Seed | Round of 16 | Quarterfinals | Semifinals | Final / BM | Rank |
| Athlete | Event | Opposition Score | Seed | Opposition Score | Opposition Score | Opposition Score | Opposition Score | Rank |
|---|---|---|---|---|---|---|---|---|
| Fatma Zehra Köse | Sabre | Emura (JPN) Gkountoura (GRE) Moseyko (RUS) Matuszak (POL) Koutogle (TOG); W 5-0; Ciss (SEN); W 5-4 | | | | | | |

Mixed Team

| Athletes | Event | Round of 16 | Quarterfinals | Semifinals / PM | Final / PM | Rank |
| Athletes | Event | Opposition Score | Opposition Score | Opposition Score | Opposition Score | Rank |
|---|---|---|---|---|---|---|
| | Mixed Team | | | | | |

== Gymnastics ==
=== Artistic Gymnastics ===
Turkey qualified one athlete based on its performance at the 2014 European WAG Championships.

Girls

| Athlete | Event | Apparatus | | | | Total | Rank |
| Athlete | Event | F | V | UB | BB | Total | Rank |
|---|---|---|---|---|---|---|---|
| Tutya Yılmaz | Qualification | 12.800 5 Q | 14.050 5 Q | 10.300 25 | 11.800 25 | 48.950 | 15 Q |
| Tutya Yılmaz | All-Around | 13.750 | 11.550 | 12.050 | 12.950 | 50.300 | 10 |
| Tutya Yılmaz | Floor | —N/a | | | | 9.200 | 8 |
| Tutya Yılmaz | Vault | —N/a | | | | 13.533 | 8 |

== Judo ==
Turkey qualified two athletes based on its performance at the 2013 Cadet World Judo Championships.

Individual

| Athlete | Event | Quarterfinals | Semifinals | Rep 1 | Final / BM | Rank |
| Athlete | Event | Opposition Result | Opposition Result | Opposition Result | Opposition Result | Rank |
|---|---|---|---|---|---|---|
| Oğuzhan Karaca | Boys' -55 kg | Mogopa (BOT); W 100-000 | Zhauyntayev (KAZ); L 000-001 | —N/a | Jolly (AUS); W 010-000 | 3rd place, bronze medalist(s) |
| Melisa Çakmaklı | Girls' -44 kg | Quizhpi (ECU); W 100-000 | Yamauchi (JPN); W 001-000 | —N/a | Aliyeva (AZE); W 000-000 | 1st place, gold medalist(s) |

Team

| Athletes | Event | Round of 16 | Quarterfinals | Semifinals | Final | Rank |
| Athletes | Event | Opposition Result | Opposition Result | Opposition Result | Opposition Result | Rank |
|---|---|---|---|---|---|---|
| Team Kano; Melisa Çakmaklı (TUR); Salim Darukhi (TJK); Mariam Janashvili (GEO); Arso Milic (MNE); Gavin Mogopa (BOT); Elvismar Rodriguez (VEN); Stoyan Tarapanov (BUL); Tea Tintor (SRB) | Mixed Team | Team Rouge (MIX); L 2 – 5 | Did not advance | | | 9 |

== Modern Pentathlon ==
Turkey qualified one athlete based on its performance at the 2014 Youth A World Championships.

| Athlete | Event | Fencing Ranking Round (épée one touch) | | Swimming (200 m freestyle) | | | Fencing Final round (épée one touch) | | | Combined: Shooting/Running (10 m air pistol)/(3000 m) | | | Total Points | Final Rank |
| Athlete | Event | Results | Rank | Time | Rank | Points | Results | Rank | Points | Time | Rank | Points | Total Points | Final Rank |
|---|---|---|---|---|---|---|---|---|---|---|---|---|---|---|
| İlke Özyüksel | Girls' Individual | | | | 5 | 285 | | | | | | | 1024 | 5 |
| Ilke Ozyuksel (TUR); Unknown | Mixed Relay | | | | | | | | | | | | | |

== Rowing ==
Turkey qualified one boat based on its performance at the 2013 World Rowing Junior Championships.

| Athlete | Event | Heats | | Repechage | | Final | |
| Athlete | Event | Time | Rank | Time | Rank | Time | Rank |
|---|---|---|---|---|---|---|---|
| Eren Can Aslan; Gökhan Güven | Boys' Pairs | | | | | 3:12.21 | 3rd place, bronze medalist(s) |

Qualification Legend: FA=Final A (medal); FB=Final B (non-medal); FC=Final C (non-medal); FD=Final D (non-medal); SA/B=Semifinals A/B; SC/D=Semifinals C/D; R=Repechage

== Sailing ==
Turkey was given a reallocation boat based on being a top ranked nation not yet qualified.

| Athlete | Event | Race | | | | | | | | | | | Net Points | Final Rank |
| Athlete | Event | 1 | 2 | 3 | 4 | 5 | 6 | 7 | 8 | 9 | 10 | M* | Net Points | Final Rank |
|---|---|---|---|---|---|---|---|---|---|---|---|---|---|---|
| Derin Günenç | Girls' Techno 293 | 13 | 13 | (18) | 12 | 17 | 16 | 21 | Cancelled | | | 110.00 | 92.00 | 17 |

== Shooting ==
Turkey qualified one shooter based on its performance at the 2014 European Shooting Championships.

Individual

| Athlete | Event | Qualification | | Final | |
| Athlete | Event | Points | Rank | Points | Rank |
|---|---|---|---|---|---|
| Nurullah Aksoy | Boys' 10m Air Rifle | 605.0 | 15 | Did not advance | |

Team

| Athletes | Event | Qualification | | Round of 16 | Quarterfinals | Semifinals | Final / BM | Rank |
| Athletes | Event | Points | Rank | Opposition Result | Opposition Result | Opposition Result | Opposition Result | Rank |
|---|---|---|---|---|---|---|---|---|
| Nurullah Aksoy (TUR); Pei Ruijiao (CHN) | Mixed Team 10m Air Rifle | | | | | | | |

== Swimming ==
Turkey qualified four swimmers.

Boys

| Athlete | Event | Heat | | Semifinal | | Final | |
| Athlete | Event | Time | Rank | Time | Rank | Time | Rank |
|---|---|---|---|---|---|---|---|
| Berk Özkul | 50 m backstroke | 27.29 | 24 | Did not advance | | | |
| Berk Özkul | 50 m butterfly | 25.52 | 26 | Did not advance | | | |
| Bedirhan Yıldız | 50 m butterfly | 25.85 | 29 | Did not advance | | | |

Girls

| Athlete | Event | Heat | | Semifinal | | Final | |
| Athlete | Event | Time | Rank | Time | Rank | Time | Rank |
|---|---|---|---|---|---|---|---|
| İlknur Nihan Çakıcı | 50 m freestyle | 26.37 | 14 Q | 26.26 | 15 | Did not advance | |
| İlknur Nihan Çakıcı | 100 m freestyle | 57.30 QSO 57.23 | 16 Q | 57.39 | 16 | Did not advance | |
| Nida Eliz Üstündağ | 50 m butterfly | 28.09 | 16 | 27.80 | 14 | Did not advance | |
| Nida Eliz Üstündağ | 100 m butterfly | 1:01.33 | 11 | 1:01.31 | 12 | Did not advance | |
| Nida Eliz Üstündağ | 200 m butterfly | 2:16.34 | 15 | —N/a | | Did not advance | |

== Taekwondo ==
Turkey qualified three athletes based on its performance at the Taekwondo Qualification Tournament.

Boys

| Athlete | Event | Round of 16 | Quarterfinals | Semifinals | Final | Rank |
| Athlete | Event | Opposition Result | Opposition Result | Opposition Result | Opposition Result | Rank |
|---|---|---|---|---|---|---|
| Talha Bayram | +73 kg | | | Voronovskyy (UKR); L 4 - 9 | Did not advance | 3rd place, bronze medalist(s) |

Girls

| Athlete | Event | Round of 16 | Quarterfinals | Semifinals | Final | Rank |
| Athlete | Event | Opposition Result | Opposition Result | Opposition Result | Opposition Result | Rank |
|---|---|---|---|---|---|---|
| Zehra Döşüçukur | −49 kg | Bye | Zhan (CHN); L 7 - 16 | Did not advance | | 5 |
| Fatma Sarıdoğan | −55 kg | Bye | Simankova (CZE); W 9 - 5 | Kudashova (RUS); W 10 - 8 | Babić (CRO); L 0 - 1 | 2nd place, silver medalist(s) |

== Weightlifting ==
Turkey qualified 1 quota in the boys' and girls' events based on the team ranking after the 2014 Weightlifting Youth European Championships.

Boys

| Athlete | Event | Snatch | | Clean & jerk | | Total | Rank |
| Athlete | Event | Result | Rank | Result | Rank | Total | Rank |
|---|---|---|---|---|---|---|---|
| Sadrettin Gedik | −77 kg | 135 | 4 | 160 | 5 | 295 | 5 |

Girls

| Athlete | Event | Snatch | | Clean & jerk | | Total | Rank |
| Athlete | Event | Result | Rank | Result | Rank | Total | Rank |
|---|---|---|---|---|---|---|---|
| Gamze Karakol | −48 kg | 65 | 4 | 85 | 4 | 150 | 4 |

== Wrestling ==
Turkey qualified three athletes based on its performance at the 2014 European Cadet Championships.

Key:
- VT - Victory by Fall.
- PP - Decision by Points - the loser with technical points.
- PO - Decision by Points - the loser without technical points.

Boys

| Athlete | Event | Group stage | | | | Final / RM | Rank |
| Athlete | Event | Opposition Score | Opposition Score | Opposition Score | Rank | Opposition Score | Rank |
|---|---|---|---|---|---|---|---|
| Cabbar Duyum | Freestyle -46kg | Olivas (USA); L 0-4 | Hegab (EGY); W | Gurdian Lopez (NCA); W 3-1 | 2 Q | Tigreros (COL); W 3-1 ^{PP} | 3rd place, bronze medalist(s) |
| Fatih Aslan | Greco-Roman -42kg | Masyk (UKR); W | Leilua (ASA); W 4-1 | Belghelam (ALG); W 4-0 | 1 Q | Ri (PRK); L 1-3 ^{PP} | 2nd place, silver medalist(s) |
| Uğur Beytekin | Greco-Roman -50kg | Najafov (AZE); L 0 - 4 ^{ST} | Cojocari (MDA); W 4 - 0 ^{VT} | Aghaniachari (IRI); L 1 - 4 ^{ST} | 3 Q | Correia (BRA); W 4 - 0 ^{ST} | 5 |

Girls

| Athlete | Event | Group stage | | | | Final / RM | Rank |
| Athlete | Event | Opposition Score | Opposition Score | Opposition Score | Rank | Opposition Score | Rank |
|---|---|---|---|---|---|---|---|
| Tuğba Kılıç | Freestyle -70kg | Keju (MHL); W 4 - 0 | Youin (CIV); W 3 - 1 | Park (KOR); W | 1 Q | Shisterova (RUS); L 0 - 4 ^{VT} | 2nd place, silver medalist(s) |
