= Slovenia at the 2014 Summer Youth Olympics =

- IOC code: SLO
- NOC: Slovenian Olympic Committee
- Website: www.olympic.si

in Nanjing
- Competitors: 48 in 14 sports
- Medals Ranked 29th: Gold 2 Silver 2 Bronze 3 Total 7

Summer Youth Olympics appearances
- 2010; 2014; 2018; 2026

Slovenia competed at the 2014 Summer Youth Olympics, in Nanjing, China from 16 August to 28 August 2014.

== Medalists ==
Medal	Name	Sport	Event	Date
Gold	Urh Kastelic; Jan Prevolnik; Matic Kotar; Jaka Malus; Tilen Sokolič; Jakob Beđeti; Žiga Urbič; Gal Marguč; Rok Cvetko; Leon Rašo; Darko Stojnić; Aleks Kavčič; Luka Kikanović; Blaž Janc	Handball	Boys' tournament	25 August
Gold	Anže Urankar	Canoeing	Boys' K1 slalom	27 August
Silver	Žiga Lah	Basketball	Boys' dunk contest	21 August
Silver	Ela Mićunović	Basketball	Girls' shoot-out contest	21 August
Bronze	Maruša Štangar	Judo	Girls' 52 kg	18 August
Bronze	Nastja Govejšek	Swimming	Girls' 50 metre butterfly	20 August
Bronze	Leda Kroselj	Athletics	Girls' pole vault	23 August

== Archery ==
Slovenia qualified a male archer from its performance at the 2013 World Archery Youth Championships. Slovenia later qualified a female archer from its performance at the 2014 European Archery Youth Championships.

Individual

Athlete	Event	Ranking round		Round of 32	Round of 16	Quarterfinals	Semifinals	Final / BM	Rank
Athlete	Event	Score	Seed	Opposition Score	Opposition Score	Opposition Score	Opposition Score	Opposition Score	Rank
Gašper Štrajhar	Boys' Individual	615	28	Tapia (MEX); L 0–6	Did not advance				17
Ivana Laharnar	Girls' Individual	635	13	Sutton (AUS); W 6–2	Marin (ESP); L 2–6	Did not advance			9

Team

Athletes	Event	Ranking round		Round of 32	Round of 16	Quarterfinals	Semifinals	Final / BM	Rank
Athletes	Event	Score	Seed	Opposition Score	Opposition Score	Opposition Score	Opposition Score	Opposition Score	Rank
Gašper Štrajhar (SLO); Melanie Gaubil (FRA)	Mixed Team	1278	21	Peters (CAN); Tuokkola (FIN); L 4-5	Did not advance				17
Ivana Laharnar (SLO); Francisco Rodriguez Sas (ARG)	Mixed Team	1284	16	Rivera (MEX); Koenig (FRA); L 2-6	Did not advance				17

== Athletics ==
Slovenia qualified four athletes.

Qualification Legend: Q=Final A (medal); qB=Final B (non-medal); qC=Final C (non-medal); qD=Final D (non-medal); qE=Final E (non-medal)

Girls
Field events

Athlete	Event	Qualification		Final	
Athlete	Event	Distance	Rank	Distance	Rank
Tina Božič	Triple jump	12.22	10 qB	DNS	
Lara Omerzu	High jump	1.78	1 Q	1.75	7
Leda Krošelj	Pole vault	3.70	2 Q	3.90	3rd place, bronze medalist(s)
Tjaša Stanko	Javelin throw	50.14	7 Q	47.21	9

== Badminton ==
Slovenia qualified two athletes based on the 2 May 2014 BWF Junior World Rankings.

Singles

Athlete	Event	Group stage				Quarterfinal	Semifinal	Final / BM	Rank
Athlete	Event	Opposition Score	Opposition Score	Opposition Score	Rank	Opposition Score	Opposition Score	Opposition Score	Rank
Andraž Krapež	Boys' Singles	Weisskirchen (GER); L 0-2	Vlaar (NED); W 2-1	Citron (FRA); L 1-2	3	did not advance			
Katarina Beton	Girls' Singles	He (CHN); L 0-2	Lee (MAS); L 0-2	Lais (AUT); W 2-1	3	did not advance			

Doubles

Athlete	Event	Group stage				Quarterfinal	Semifinal	Final / BM	Rank
Athlete	Event	Opposition Score	Opposition Score	Opposition Score	Rank	Opposition Score	Opposition Score	Opposition Score	Rank
Alida Chen (NED); Andraž Krapež (SLO)	Mixed Doubles	Abdelhakim (EGY); Mitsova (BUL); W 2-0	Joshi (IND); Kabelo (BOT); W 2-1	Sarsekenov (UKR); Yamaguchi (JPN); W 2-0	1QF	Narongrit (THA); Qin (CHN); L 0-2	did not advance		5
Katarina Beton (SLO); Anthony Ginting (INA)	Mixed Doubles	Weisskirchen (GER); Ishaak (SUR); W 2-0	Kurt (TUR); Pavlinić (CRO); W 2-0	Shishkov (BUL); Heim (GER); W 2-0	1QF	Angodavidanalage (SRI); He (CHN); L 1-2	did not advance		5

== Basketball ==
Slovenia qualified a boys' and girls' team from their performance at the 2013 3x3 World Tour Final.

Skills Competition

Athlete	Event	Qualification				Final First Stage				Final Second Stage			
Athlete	Event	Round 1	Round 2	Total	Rank	Round 1	Round 2	Total	Rank	Round 1	Round 2	Total	Rank
Žiga Lah	Boys' Dunk Contest	27	27	54	1 Q	30	29	59	1	26	0	26	2nd place, silver medalist(s)

Athlete	Event	Qualification			Final		
Athlete	Event	Points	Time	Rank	Points	Time	Rank
Ela Mićunović	Girls' Shoot-out Contest	6	22.4	3 Q	4	31.6	2nd place, silver medalist(s)

=== Boys' tournament ===
Roster

- Gregor Klobčar
- Milan Kovačevič
- Žiga Lah
- Aljaž Slutej

Group stage

Pos	Team	Pld	W	L	PF	PA	PD	Pts	Qualification
1	Lithuania	9	9	0	165	129	+36	18	Round of 16
2	Slovenia	9	7	2	152	120	+32	16	Round of 16
3	China	9	6	3	164	143	+21	15 (Note: CHN +1, PUR −1)	Round of 16
4	Puerto Rico	9	6	3	152	136	+16	15	Round of 16
5	Poland	9	5	4	153	127	+26	14	Round of 16
6	France	9	4	5	151	127	+24	13	Round of 16
7	Hungary	9	3	6	158	165	−7	12	Round of 16
8	Uruguay	9	2	7	103	154	−51	11 (Note: URU +1, GER −1)	Round of 16
9	Germany	9	2	7	118	149	−31	11	Eliminated
10	Indonesia	9	1	8	86	152	−66	10	Eliminated

Notes:

18 August 2014
17:00

Hungary	19–21	Slovenia

Wutaishan Sports Center, Nanjing

18 August 2014
21:20

Slovenia	15–11	France

Wutaishan Sports Center, Nanjing

19 August 2014
19:40

Germany	9–21	Slovenia

Wutaishan Sports Center, Nanjing

20 August 2014
17:40

Slovenia	12–16	Puerto Rico

Wutaishan Sports Center, Nanjing

20 August 2014
20:40

Uruguay	11–13	Slovenia

Wutaishan Sports Center, Nanjing

22 August 2014
19:20

Slovenia	21–6	Indonesia

Wutaishan Sports Center, Nanjing

23 August 2014
18:20

Lithuania	21–14	Slovenia

Wutaishan Sports Center, Nanjing

23 August 2014
20:40

Slovenia	19–15	China

Wutaishan Sports Center, Nanjing

24 August 2014
19:20

Poland	12–16	Slovenia

Wutaishan Sports Center, Nanjing

Knockout Stage

Round of 16	Quarterfinals	Semifinals	Final	Rank
Opposition Score	Opposition Score	Opposition Score	Opposition Score	Rank
Romania; L 14-20	did not advance			9

=== Girls' tournament ===
Roster

- Maruša Derlink
- Althea Gwashavanhu
- Ela Mićunović
- Maruša Seničar

Group stage

Pos	Team	Pld	W	D	L	PF	PA	PD	Pts	Qualification
1	Netherlands	9	8	0	1	164	87	+77	24	Round of 16
2	Hungary	9	8	0	1	146	91	+55	24	Round of 16
3	Spain	9	7	0	2	151	95	+56	21	Round of 16
4	Estonia	9	5	0	4	130	109	+21	15	Round of 16
5	China	9	5	0	4	128	103	+25	15	Round of 16
6	Germany	9	4	0	5	111	133	−22	12	Round of 16
7	Brazil	9	3	0	6	101	123	−22	9	Round of 16
8	Venezuela	9	2	0	7	101	153	−52	6	Round of 16
9	Slovenia	9	2	0	7	120	156	−36	6	Eliminated
10	Syria	9	1	0	8	68	170	−102	3	Eliminated

18 August 2014
18:40

Hungary	18–12	Slovenia

Wutaishan Sports Center, Nanjing

19 August 2014
18:00

Slovenia	18–20	China

Wutaishan Sports Center, Nanjing

19 August 2014
21:20

Spain	21–7	Slovenia

Wutaishan Sports Center, Nanjing

20 August 2014
19:20

Slovenia	14–16	Estonia

Wutaishan Sports Center, Nanjing

22 August 2014
17:20

Germany	13–18	Slovenia

Wutaishan Sports Center, Nanjing

22 August 2014
21:00

Slovenia	vs.	Venezuela

Wutaishan Sports Center, Nanjing

23 August 2014
20:00

Brazil	20–9	Slovenia

Wutaishan Sports Center, Nanjing

24 August 2014
18:00

Slovenia	14–11	Syria

Wutaishan Sports Center, Nanjing

24 August 2014
21:00

Netherlands	vs.	Slovenia

Wutaishan Sports Center, Nanjing

== Canoeing ==
Slovenia qualified two boats based on its performance at the 2013 World Junior Canoe Sprint and Slalom Championships.

Boys

Athlete	Event	Qualification		Repechage		Round of 16		Quarterfinals	Semifinals	Final / BM	Rank
Athlete	Event	Time	Rank	Time	Rank	Time	Rank	Opposition Result	Opposition Result	Opposition Result	Rank
Leon Breznik	C1 slalom	1:21.785	4 Q	—N/a				Jisung (KOR); W 1:27.756	Hendrick (IRL); L 1:25.750	Breznik (SVK); L 1:23:257	4
Leon Breznik	C1 sprint	2:58.495	14 Q	—N/a		3:14.354	14	Did not advance			14
Anže Urankar	K1 slalom	1:08.336	3 Q	—N/a		1:08.607	3 Q	Sherman (USA); W 1:09.675	Sunderland (GBR); W 1:10.877	Grigar (SVK); W 1:09.057	1st place, gold medalist(s)
Anže Urankar	K1 sprint	1:42.498	12 R	1:44.654	4 Q	1:39.292	11	Did not advance			11

== Cycling ==
Slovenia qualified a boys' and girls' team based on its ranking issued by the UCI.

Team

Athletes	Event	Cross-Country Eliminator		Time Trial			BMX		Cross-Country Race			Road Race			Total Pts	Rank
Athletes	Event	Rank	Points	Time	Rank	Points	Rank	Points	Time	Rank	Points	Time	Rank	Points	Total Pts	Rank
Jon Božič; Peter Zupančič	Boys' Team	14	3	5:17.30	8	20	19	0	59:17	11	8	1:38:53; 1:49:13	45; 52	0	31	18
Katja Jeretina; Anita Žnidaršič	Girls' Team	27	0	6:05.81	7	25	20	0	-1 LAP	23	0	1:12:36; 1:12:53	4; 34	50	75	15

Mixed Relay

Athletes	Event	Cross-Country Girls' Race	Cross-Country Boys' Race	Boys' Road Race	Girls' Road Race	Total Time	Rank
Anita Žnidaršič; Peter Zupančič; Jon Božič; Katja Jeretina	Mixed Team Relay					18:52	15

== Golf ==
Slovenia qualified one team of two athletes based on the 8 June 2014 IGF Combined World Amateur Golf Rankings.

Individual

Athlete	Event	Round 1		Round 2			Round 3			Total	
Athlete	Event	Score	Rank	Score	Total	Rank	Score	Total	Rank	Score	Rank
Žan Luka Štirn	Boys	70 (-2)	11	71 (-1)	141 (-3)	6	72 (par)	213 (-3)	10	213	=10
Ana Belac	Girls	76 (+4)	22	72 (par)	148 (+4)	13	75 (+3)	223 (+7)	17	223	=17

Team

Athletes	Event	Round 1 (Foursome)		Round 2 (Fourball)			Round 3 (Individual Stroke)				Total	
Athletes	Event	Score	Rank	Score	Total	Rank	Boy	Girl	Total	Rank	Score	Rank
Žan Luka Štirn; Ana Belac	Mixed	69 (-3)	17	74 (+2)	143 (-1)	17	69 (-3)	76 (+4)	288 (par)	15	288	15

== Handball ==
Slovenia qualified a boys team by winning the gold medal at the 2013 European Youth Summer Olympic Festival.

=== Boys' tournament ===
Roster

- Jakob Beđet
- Rok Cvetko
- Blaž Janc
- Urh Kastelic
- Aleks Kavčič
- Luka Kikanović
- Matic Kotar
- Jaka Malus
- Gal Marguč
- Jan Prevolnik
- Leon Rašo
- Tilen Sokolič
- Darko Stojnić
- Žiga Urbič

Group stage

Team	Pld	W	D	L	GF	GA	GD	Pts	Qualification
Slovenia	2	2	0	0	71	35	+36	4	Semifinals
Qatar	2	1	0	1	49	61	−12	2	Semifinals
Tunisia	2	0	0	2	35	59	−24	0	5th place game

21 August; 20:00	Slovenia	33 - 12	Tunisia	Jiangning Sports Centre Gymnasium, Nanjing
21 August; 20:00	Marguč 10; Kavčič 5 Malus, Janc 4 Prevolnik, Sokolič 3 Beđeti 2 Kikanović, Rašo 1	(18 - 4)	Ben Dhia 4 Ghachem 3 Ben Araar 2 Ayari, Haj Romdhane, Zouaoui 1	Jiangning Sports Centre Gymnasium, Nanjing
21 August; 20:00	2× (yellow card) 5× (suspension)		4× (yellow card) 10× (suspension)	Jiangning Sports Centre Gymnasium, Nanjing

22 August; 20:00	Qatar	23 - 38	Slovenia	Jiangning Sports Centre Gymnasium, Nanjing

Semifinals

24 August; 20:00	Norway	30 - 33	Slovenia	Jiangning Sports Center Gymnasium
24 August; 20:00		(14 - 13)		Jiangning Sports Center Gymnasium

Gold-medal match

25 August; 20:30	Egypt	25 - 31	Slovenia (gold)	Jiangning Sports Center Gymnasium
25 August; 20:30		(11 - 13)		Jiangning Sports Center Gymnasium

== Judo ==
Slovenia qualified one athlete based on its performance at the 2013 Cadet World Judo Championships.

Individual

Athlete	Event	Round of 32	Round of 16	Quarterfinals	Semifinals	Rep 1	Rep 2	Rep 3	Rep 4	Final / BM	Rank
Athlete	Event	Opposition Result	Opposition Result	Opposition Result	Opposition Result	Opposition Result	Opposition Result	Opposition Result	Opposition Result	Opposition Result	Rank
Maruša Štangar	Girls' -52 kg	Minenkova (BLR); W 101-001	Siderot (POR); W 100-000	Elizeche (ARG); W 100-000	Temelkova (BUL); L 000-002	—N/a				Liu (CHN); W 100-000	3rd place, bronze medalist(s)

Team

Athletes	Event	Round of 16	Quarterfinals	Semifinals	Final	Rank
Athletes	Event	Opposition Result	Opposition Result	Opposition Result	Opposition Result	Rank
Team Xian; Hifumi Abe (JPN); Chiara Carminucci (ITA); Naomi de Brune (AUS); Jolan Florimont (FRA); Brillith Gamarra (PER); Felix Penning (LUX); Maruša Štangar (SLO); Idan Vardi (ISR)	Mixed Team	Team Tani (MIX); W 7 – 0	Team Berghmans (MIX); W 4 – 3	Team Rouge (MIX); L 3 – 4	Did not advance	3rd place, bronze medalist(s)

== Rowing ==
Slovenia qualified one boat based on its performance at the 2013 World Rowing Junior Championships.

Athlete	Event	Heats		Repechage		Final	
Athlete	Event	Time	Rank	Time	Rank	Time	Rank
Vid Pugelj; Žiga Zarič	Boys' Pairs	3:14.65	3 R	3:12.55	1 FA	3:12.30	4

Qualification Legend: FA=Final A (medal); FB=Final B (non-medal); FC=Final C (non-medal); FD=Final D (non-medal); SA/B=Semifinals A/B; SC/D=Semifinals C/D; R=Repechage

== Sailing ==
Slovenia was given a reallocation boat based on being a top ranked nation not yet qualified.

Athlete	Event	Race											Net Points	Final Rank
Athlete	Event	1	2	3	4	5	6	7	8	9	10	M*	Net Points	Final Rank
Toni Vrščaj	Boys' Techno 293	12	13	7	(14)	10	7	10	Cancelled			73.00	59.00	10

== Shooting ==
Slovenia was given a wild card to compete.

Individual

Athlete	Event	Qualification		Final	
Athlete	Event	Points	Rank	Points	Rank
Jože Čeper	Boys' 10m Air Pistol	550	15	Did not advance	

Team

Athletes	Event	Qualification		Round of 16	Quarterfinals	Semifinals	Final / BM	Rank
Athletes	Event	Points	Rank	Opposition Result	Opposition Result	Opposition Result	Opposition Result	Rank
Yashaswini Singh Deswal (IND); Jože Čeper (SLO)	Mixed Team 10m Air Pistol	754	3 Q	Audrey-Anne Le Sieur (CAN); Jiayu Wu (CHN); W 10-5	Lidia Nencheva (BUL); Vladimir Svechnikov (UZB); L 5-10	Did not advance		5

== Swimming ==
Slovenia qualified four swimmers.

Boys

Athlete	Event	Heat		Semifinal		Final	
Athlete	Event	Time	Rank	Time	Rank	Time	Rank
Grega Popović	400 m freestyle	4:01.69	23	—N/a		Did not advance	
Grega Popović	800 m freestyle	—N/a				8:19.37	17
Žan Pogačar	50 m backstroke	26.85	19	Did not advance			
Žan Pogačar	100 m backstroke	57.46	20	Did not advance			
Žan Pogačar	200 m backstroke	2:02.84	9	—N/a		Did not advance	

Girls

Athlete	Event	Heat		Semifinal		Final	
Athlete	Event	Time	Rank	Time	Rank	Time	Rank
Tjaša Pintar	50 m freestyle	26.33	13 Q	25.94	8 Q	25.82	6
Tjaša Pintar	100 m freestyle	56.39	11 Q	56.42	13	Did not advance	
Tjaša Pintar	200 m freestyle	2:01.56	9	—N/a		Did not advance	
Tjaša Pintar	400 m freestyle	4:22.77	18	—N/a		Did not advance	
Tjaša Pintar	50 m breaststroke	—N/a					
Nastja Govejšek	50 m freestyle	26.18	8 Q	25.90	7 Q	25.95	7
Nastja Govejšek	100 m freestyle	56.09	8 Q	55.82	9	Did not advance	
Nastja Govejšek	50 m butterfly	27.09	3 Q	26.77	2 Q	26.70	3rd place, bronze medalist(s)
Nastja Govejšek	100 m butterfly	1:06.08	27	Did not advance			

Mixed

Athlete	Event	Heat		Final	
Athlete	Event	Time	Rank	Time	Rank
Nastja Govejšek; Tjaša Pintar; Žan Pogačar; Grega Popović	4 × 100 m freestyle relay	3:38.17	9	Did not advance	
Nastja Govejšek; Tjaša Pintar; Žan Pogačar; Grega Popović	4 × 100 m medley relay	4:06.32	17	Did not advance	

== Taekwondo ==
Slovenia qualified one athlete based on its performance at the Taekwondo Qualification Tournament.

Boys

Athlete	Event	Round of 16	Quarterfinals	Semifinals	Final	Rank
Athlete	Event	Opposition Result	Opposition Result	Opposition Result	Opposition Result	Rank
Lucijan Kobal	+73 kg	Voronovskyy (UKR); L 2 - 7	Did not advance			5
