= India at the 2014 Summer Youth Olympics =

- IOC code: IND
- NOC: Indian Olympic Association

in Nanjing
- Competitors: 32 in 15 sports
- Flag bearers: Opening: Shyam Kumar Kakara; Closing:
- Medals Ranked 64th: Gold 0 Silver 1 Bronze 1 Total 2

Summer Youth Olympics appearances (overview)
- 2010; 2014; 2018; 2026

India competed at the 2014 Summer Youth Olympics, in Nanjing, China from 16 August to 28 August 2014. India, which had won 8 medals in 2010 games, managed just 2 medals this time.

== Medalists ==
Medal	Name	Sport	Event	Date
Silver	Venkat Rahul Ragala	Weightlifting	Boys' Weightlifting(77 kg)	21 August
Bronze	Atul Verma	Archery	Boys' Individual	26 August

== Archery ==
Two archers from India qualified due to their performance at the 2013 World Archery Youth Championships.

Athlete	Event	Ranking round		Round of 32	Round of 16	Quarterfinals	Semifinals	Final / BM	Rank
Athlete	Event	Score	Seed	Opposition Score	Opposition Score	Opposition Score	Opposition Score	Opposition Score	Rank
Atul Verma	Boys' Individual	688	2	Min TK (MYA); W 6–0	Szafran (POL); W 6–2	Muto (JPN); W 6–2	D'Almeida (BRA); L 4–6	Gazoz (TUR); W 6–4	3rd place, bronze medalist(s)
Hema Latha Boda	Girls' Individual	640	12	Raysin (ISR); W 7–3	Gaubil (FRA); L 0–6	Did Not Advance			9
Atul Verma (IND); Hana Elshimy (EGY)	Mixed Team	1206	31	Mayr (GER); Tatafu (TGA); L 0–6	Did Not Advance				17
Hema Latha Boda (IND); Damyan Dachev (BUL)	Mixed Team	1286	13	Anagöz (TUR); Purnama (INA); W 5–4	Abdrazak (KAZ); D'Almeida (BRA); L 2–6	Did Not Advance			9

== Athletics ==
Five athletes from India qualified.

Qualification Legend: Q=Final A (medal); qB=Final B (non-medal)

Boys
Track & road events

Athlete	Event	Heats		Final	
Athlete	Event	Result	Rank	Result	Rank
Ajay Kumar Saroj	1500 m	3:51:71 PB	1 Q	3:46.92 PB	5
Maymon Paulose	110 m hurdles	13.64 PB	3 Q	13.57 PB	4

Field Events

Athlete	Event	Qualification		Final	
Athlete	Event	Distance	Rank	Distance	Rank
Mithravarun Senthil Kumar	Discus throw	54.71	9 Q	57.06	5

Girls
Track & road events

Athlete	Event	Final	
Athlete	Event	Result	Rank
K.T.Neena	5 km walk	25:02.19	11

Field events

Athlete	Event	Qualification		Final	
Athlete	Event	Distance	Rank	Distance	Rank
Pushpa Jakhar	Javelin throw	50.21	6 Q	49.56	6

== Badminton ==
Two shuttlers from India qualified based on the BWF World Junior Rankings.

Athlete	Event	Group stage				Quarterfinal	Semifinal	Final / BM	Rank
Athlete	Event	Opposition Score	Opposition Score	Opposition Score	Rank	Opposition Score	Opposition Score	Opposition Score	Rank
Aditya Joshi	Boys' Singles	Petrovic (SRB); W (21–17, 21–16)	Sarsiekienov (UKR); W (21–14, 21–13)	Pham CC (VIE); W (21–14, 21–13)	1 Q	CJ Wei (MAS); W (20–22, 21–18, 21–12)	Shi Yq (CHN); L (10–21, 22–24)	Ginting (INA); L (17–21, 16–21)	4
Ruthvika Shivani	Girls' Singles	Konieczna (POL); W (21–10, 21–4)	Lai (AUS); W (21–18, 21–11)	Hartawan (INA); L (14–21, 15–21)	2	Did Not Advance			
Tessa Kabelo (BOT); Aditya Joshi (IND)	Mixed Doubles	Sarsiekienov (UKR); Yamaguchi (JPN); L (19–21, 17–21)	Chen (NED); Krapez (SLO); L (13–21, 21–17, 13–21)	Mitsova (BUL); Abdelhakim (EGY); W (20–22, 21–18, 21–11)	3	Did Not Advance			
Ruthvika Shivani (IND); Abraham Ayittey (GHA)	Mixed Doubles	Ong (SIN); Hendahewa (SRI); L WO	Courtois (FRA); Sebunnya (UGA); L WO	He Bj (CHN); Dias (SRI); L WO	4	Did Not Advance			

== Boxing ==
Two boxers from India qualified based on their performance in the 2014 Youth World Championships.

Boys

Athlete	Event	Preliminaries	Semifinals	Final / RM	Rank
Athlete	Event	Opposition Result	Opposition Result	Opposition Result	Rank
Shyam Kakara	-49 kg	Huseynov (AZE); L 1–2	Did Not Advance	Karakilic (TUR); W 3–0	5
Gaurav Solanki	-52 kg	Bye	Ping L (CHN); L 0–3	Md. Ali (GBR); L 0–3	4

== Canoeing ==
One boat from India qualified based on its performance at the 2013 World Junior Canoe Sprint and Slalom Championships.

Girls

Athlete	Event	Qualification		Repechage		Quarterfinals		Semifinals		Final / BM	Rank
Athlete	Event	Time	Rank	Time	Rank	Time	Rank	Time	Rank	Time	Rank
Kirti Kewat	C1 slalom	1:50.492	5 Q	—N/a		DNF	—	Did Not Advance			
Kirti Kewat	C1 sprint	2:31.856	5 qR	2:33.175	1 Q	2:35.385	2	Did Not Advance			

Qualification Legend: Q=Next Round; qR=Repechage

== Golf ==
One team of two athletes from India qualified based on the 8 June 2014 IGF Combined World Amateur Golf Rankings.

Athlete	Event	Round 1		Round 2			Round 3			Total	
Athlete	Event	Score	Rank	Score	Total	Rank	Score	Total	Rank	Score	Rank
Feroz Garewal	Boys' Individual	73	19	69	142	7	70	212	5	212	5
Aditi Ashok	Girls' Individual	74	16	70	144	6	76	220	11	220	11
Feroz Garewal; Aditi Ashok	Mixed team	66	9	72	138	9	153	291	21	291	21

== Gymnastics ==
=== Artistic Gymnastics ===
One gymnast from India qualified based on the performance at the 2014 Asian Artistic Gymnastics Championships.

Boys

Athlete	Event	Apparatus						Total	Rank
Athlete	Event	Floor	Pommel horse	Rings	Vault	Parallel bars	Horizontal bar	Total	Rank
Abhijeet Kumar	Qualification	12.650	13.000	10.000	13.600	12.650	12.250	74.150	26

== Rowing ==
One boat from India qualified based on its performance at the Asian Qualification Regatta.

Athlete	Event	Seeding Heats		Heats		Repechage		Final	
Athlete	Event	Time	Rank	Time	Rank	Time	Rank	Time	Rank
Amit Kumar; Atul Kumar	Boys' Pairs	3:28.36	4	3:22.68	6 R	3:25.03	5 FB	3:26.56	6

Qualification Legend: FA=Final A (medal); FB=Final B (non-medal); R=Repechage

== Sailing ==
India was given a reallocation boat based on being a top ranked nation not yet qualified.

Athlete	Event	Race											Net Points	Final Rank
Athlete	Event	1	2	3	4	5	6	7	8	9	10	Final	Net Points	Final Rank
Katya Ida Coelho	Girls' Techno 293	18	20	21	20	DNF	20	CNC	CNC	CNC	CNC	19	117	21

== Shooting ==
2 shooters from India qualified based on their performance in the 2014 Asian Shooting Championships.

Individual

Athlete	Event	Qualification		Final	
Athlete	Event	Points	Rank	Points	Rank
Prashant Tanwar	Boys' 10m Air Rifle	606.0	13	Did Not Advance	
Yashaswini Singh Deswal	Girls' 10m Air Pistol	377	5 Q	117.6	6

Team

Athletes	Event	Qualification		Round of 16	Quarterfinals	Semifinals	Final / BM	Rank
Athletes	Event	Points	Rank	Opposition Result	Opposition Result	Opposition Result	Opposition Result	Rank
Prashant (IND); Angirmaa Nergui (MGL)	Mixed Team 10m Air Rifle	813.5	12 Q	Khedmati (IRI); Friman (FIN); W 10–7	Sukhorukova (UKR); Lu S-c (TPE); L 9–10	Did Not Advance		8
Yashaswini Singh Deswal (IND); Joze Ceper (SLO)	Mixed Team 10m Air Pistol	754	3 Q	Le Sieur (CAN); Wu Jy (CHN); W 10–5	Nencheva (BUL); Svechnikov (UZB); L 5–10	Did Not Advance		8

== Swimming ==
India qualified two swimmers.

Athlete	Event	Heat		Semifinal		Final	
Athlete	Event	Time	Rank	Time	Rank	Time	Rank
Supriya Mondal	Boys' 100 m butterfly	56.23	19	Did Not Advance			
Supriya Mondal	Boys' 200 m butterfly	2:03.71	12	—N/a		Did Not Advance	
Kataryla Shivani	Girls' 100 m freestyle	58.87	30	Did Not Advance			
Kataryla Shivani	Girls' 200 m freestyle	2:06.44	25	—N/a		Did Not Advance	

== Table Tennis ==
2 athletes from India qualified based on their performance in the 2014 Asian Qualifying Event.

Singles

Athlete	Event	Group Stage				Round of 16	Quarterfinals	Semifinals	Final / BM	
Athlete	Event	Opposition Score	Opposition Score	Opposition Score	Rank	Opposition Score	Opposition Score	Opposition Score	Opposition Score	Rank
Abhishek Yadav	Boys	Akkuzu (FRA); L 2–3	Avvari (USA); W 3–0	Gerassimenko (KAZ); L 1–3	3 qB	Alassani (TOG); W 3–0	Levenko (AUT); W 3–1	Szudi (HUN); W 3–2	Ranefur (SWE); L 1–3	18
Sutirtha Mukherjee	Girls	Salah (DJI); W 3–0	Liu Gy (CHN); L 1–3	Piccolin (ITA); W 3–1	2 Q	Khetkhuan (THA); L 2–4	Did Not Advance			16
Sutirtha Mukherjee; Abhishek Yadav	Mixed	Kato / Muramatsu (JPN); L 0–3	Salah (DJI) / Alassani (TOG); W 3–0	Luo (CAN) / Afanador (PUR); L 1–2	3 qB	Seera (UGA) / Bienatiki (CGO); W 3–0	Herng HY / Jing YY (SIN); W 2–1	—N/a		17

Qualification Legend: Q=Main Bracket (medal); qB=Consolation Bracket (non-medal)

== Tennis ==
One athlete from India qualified based on the 9 June 2014 ITF World Junior Rankings.

Athlete	Event	Round of 32	Round of 16	Quarterfinals	Semifinals	Final / BM	Rank
Athlete	Event	Opposition Score	Opposition Score	Opposition Score	Opposition Score	Opposition Score	Rank
Ojasvinee Singh	Girls' Singles	Bains (AUS); L 4–6, 1–6	Did Not Advance				
Ojasvinee Singh (IND); Greetje Minnen (BEL)	Girls' Doubles	—N/a	Bains / Hon (AUS); L 2–6, 3–6	Did Not Advance			
Ojasvinee Singh (IND); Sharmal Dissanaayake (SRI)	Mixed Doubles	Kenin / Rybakov (USA); L 2–6, 6–4, [9–11]	Did Not Advance				

== Weightlifting ==
Two lifters in the boys' events and one lifter in the girls' event qualified from India based on the team ranking after the 2013 Weightlifting Youth World Championships.

Athlete	Event	Snatch		Clean & jerk		Total	Rank
Athlete	Event	Result	Rank	Result	Rank	Total	Rank
Lalchhanhima	Boys' 56 kg	NL		DNF		―	―
Venkat Rahul Ragala	Boys' 77 kg	141	2	175	2	316	2nd place, silver medalist(s)
Thasana Chanu	Girls' 58 kg	70	5	90	6	160	6

== Wrestling ==
Four wrestlers from India qualified based on their performance at the 2014 Asian Cadet Championships.

Key:

- VT - Victory by Fall.
- PP - Decision by Points - the loser with technical points.
- PO - Decision by Points - the loser without technical points.

Athlete	Event	Group stage				Final / RM	Rank
Athlete	Event	Opposition Score	Opposition Score	Opposition Score	Rank	Opposition Score	Rank
Prakash Kolekar	Boys' freestyle 46 kg	Ipolito (ASA); W 4–0 ^{VT}	Tigreros (COL); L 1–3 ^{PP}	Gadzhiev (RUS); L 0–4 ^{VT}	3	Hegab (EGY); L 1–3 ^{PP}	6
Amit Kumar	Boys' freestyle 63 kg	Montero (VEN); L 1–3 ^{PP}	Lloyd (NZL); W 4–0 ^{VT}	Moore (CAN); W 3–1 ^{PP}	2	Julakidze (GEO); L 1–3 ^{PP}	4
Shri Pal	Boys' Greco-Roman 85 kg	Ahmed (EGY); L 1–3 ^{PP}	Kalaba (SRB); W 4–0 ^{VT}	Milov (BUL); L 1–4 ^{PP}	3	Khehira (CAN); W 4–0 ^{PO}	5
Anil Reshma Mane	Girls' freestyle 60 kg	Bullen (NOR); L 0–4 ^{VT}	Mbouma (CGO); W 3–1 ^{PP}	Larroque (FRA); L 0–4 ^{VT}	3	Stans (RSA); W 3–0 ^{PO}	5
