= Nepal at the 2014 Summer Youth Olympics =

- IOC code: NEP
- NOC: Nepal Olympic Committee

in Nanjing
- Competitors: 2 in 2 sports
- Medals: Gold 0 Silver 0 Bronze 0 Total 0

Summer Youth Olympics appearances
- 2010; 2014; 2018

Nepal competed at the 2014 Summer Youth Olympics in Nanjing, China, from 16 to 28 August 2014.

== Athletics ==
Nepal qualified one athlete.

Qualification Legend: Q=Final A (medal); qB=Final B (non-medal); qC=Final C (non-medal); qD=Final D (non-medal); qE=Final E (non-medal)

Girls
Track & road events

Athlete	Event	Heats		Final	
Athlete	Event	Result	Rank	Result	Rank
Sangita Khadka	3000 m	11:16.29	20 qB	10:52.15	19

== Badminton ==
Nepal was given a quota to compete by the tripartite committee.

Singles

Athlete	Event	Group stage				Quarterfinal	Semifinal	Final / BM	Rank
Athlete	Event	Opposition Score	Opposition Score	Opposition Score	Rank	Opposition Score	Opposition Score	Opposition Score	Rank
Dipesh Dhami	Boys' Singles	Cheam J W (MAS); L 0 – 2	M A Kurt (TUR); L 0 – 2	M Narongrit (THA); L 0 – 2	4	did not advance			

Doubles

Athlete	Event	Group stage				Quarterfinal	Semifinal	Final / BM	Rank
Athlete	Event	Opposition Score	Opposition Score	Opposition Score	Rank	Opposition Score	Opposition Score	Opposition Score	Rank
Busanan Ongbumrungpan (THA); Dipesh Dhami (NEP)	Mixed Doubles	C Asurmendi (ESP); K Jakowczuk (POL); W 2 – 1	M Konieczna (POL); Lee C Y (HKG); L 1 – 2	Lee C H (TPE); K Tsuneyama (JPN); L 0 – 2	3	did not advance			
