= Weightlifting at the 2014 Summer Youth Olympics – Boys' 77 kg =

Boys' 77 at the II Summer Youth Olympic Games
- Venue: Nanjing International Expo Center
- Dates: August 21, 2014
- Competitors: 10 from 10 nations
- Winning total weight: 319kg

Medalists
| 1st place, gold medalist(s) | | Hakob Mkrtchyan | Armenia |
| 2nd place, silver medalist(s) | | Ragala Venkat Rahul | India |
| 3rd place, bronze medalist(s) | | Zhaslan Kaliyev | Kazakhstan |

The boys' 77 kg weightlifting event was the second men's event at the weightlifting competition at the 2014 Summer Youth Olympics, with competitors limited to a maximum of 77 kilograms of body mass.

Each lifter performed in both the snatch and clean and jerk lifts, with the final score being the sum of the lifter's best result in each. The athlete received three attempts in each of the two lifts; the score for the lift was the heaviest weight successfully lifted.

== Results ==
| Rank | Name | Body Weight | Snatch (kg) | | | | Clean & Jerk (kg) | | | | Total (kg) |
| Rank | Name | Body Weight | 1 | 2 | 3 | Res | 1 | 2 | 3 | Res | Total (kg) |
|---|---|---|---|---|---|---|---|---|---|---|---|
| 1st place, gold medalist(s) | Hakob Mkrtchyan (ARM) | 76.40 | 137 | ~~142~~ | 142 | 142 | 172 | ~~177~~ | 177 | 177 | 319 |
| 2nd place, silver medalist(s) | Ragala Venkat Rahul (IND) | 76.47 | 135 | 139 | 141 | 141 | 170 | 175 | ~~179~~ | 175 | 316 |
| 3rd place, bronze medalist(s) | Zhaslan Kaliyev (KAZ) | 75.78 | 130 | 135 | 139 | 139 | 160 | 165 | 171 | 171 | 310 |
| 4 | Ahmed El-Sayed (EGY) | 76.18 | ~~135~~ | 135 | ~~138~~ | 135 | 171 | ~~176~~ | ~~176~~ | 171 | 306 |
| 5 | Sadrettin Gedik (TUR) | 75.56 | ~~132~~ | 132 | 135 | 135 | 160 | ~~170~~ | ~~170~~ | 160 | 295 |
| 6 | Kursant Tolonov (KGZ) | 76.36 | 125 | ~~130~~ | ~~130~~ | 125 | 150 | 155 | ~~160~~ | 155 | 280 |
| 7 | Sami Al-Othman (KSA) | 70.84 | 104 | 108 | 111 | 111 | 125 | 130 | ~~137~~ | 130 | 241 |
| 8 | Abdur Rehman (PAK) | 76.52 | 100 | 104 | 106 | 106 | 131 | ~~133~~ | 133 | 133 | 239 |
| 9 | Hicham Moum (MAR) | 76.41 | 95 | 102 | 106 | 106 | 124 | 127 | 131 | 131 | 237 |
| 10 | Douglas Manzo (TGA) | 76.01 | 85 | 89 | ~~93~~ | 89 | 103 | 108 | 112 | 112 | 201 |
