= Hong Kong at the 2014 Summer Youth Olympics =

- IOC code: HKG
- NOC: Sports Federation and Olympic Committee of Hong Kong, China

in Nanjing
- Competitors: 18 in 8 sports
- Flag bearer: Lee Cheuk Yiu
- Medals Ranked 56th: Gold 0 Silver 4 Bronze 1 Total 5

Summer Youth Olympics appearances (overview)
- 2010; 2014; 2018; 2026

Hong Kong competed at the 2014 Summer Youth Olympics, in Nanjing, China from 16 August to 28 August 2014.

== Medalists ==
Medals awarded to participants of mixed-NOC (Combined) teams are represented in italics. These medals are not counted towards the individual NOC medal tally.

Medal	Name	Sport	Event	Date
Gold	Kei Hsu Chien; Chun Yin Choi	Fencing	Mixed Team	20 August
Gold	Tsz Yau Ng	Badminton	Mixed doubles	22 August
Silver	Siobhan Haughey	Swimming	Girls' 200 m individual medley	17 August
Silver	Chun Yin Choi	Fencing	Boys' Foil	19 August
Silver	Siobhan Haughey	Swimming	Girls' 100 m freestyle	19 August
Silver	Hoi Kem Doo	Table Tennis	Girls' Singles	20 August
Bronze	Hoi Kem Doo; Ka Tak Hung	Table Tennis	Mixed Team	23 August

== Badminton ==
Hong Kong qualified two athletes based on the 2 May 2014 BWF Junior World Rankings.

Singles

Athlete	Event	Group stage				Quarterfinal	Semifinal	Final / BM	Rank
Athlete	Event	Opposition Score	Opposition Score	Opposition Score	Rank	Opposition Score	Opposition Score	Opposition Score	Rank
Lee Cheuk Yiu	Boys' Singles	Guda (AUS); W 2-0	Shishkov (BUL); W 2-0	Gnedt (AUT); W 2-0	1QF	Lin (CHN); L 0-2	did not advance		5
Ng Tsz Yau	Girls' Singles	Heim (GER); W 2-0	Mitsova (BUL); W 2-0	Kuuba (EST); W 2-0	1QF	Ongbumrungpan (THA); L 0-2	did not advance		5

Doubles

Athlete	Event	Group stage				Quarterfinal	Semifinal	Final / BM	Rank
Athlete	Event	Opposition Score	Opposition Score	Opposition Score	Rank	Opposition Score	Opposition Score	Opposition Score	Rank
Magda Konieczna (POL); Lee Cheuk Yiu (HKG)	Mixed doubles	Tsuneyama (JPN); Lee (TPE); L 1-2	Dhami (NEP); Ongbumrungpan (THA); W 2-1	Jakowczuk (POL); Azurmendi (ESP); W 2-1	2	did not advance			
Ng Tsz Yau (HKG); Cheam June Wei (MAS)	Mixed doubles	Gnedt (AUT); Solis (MEX); W 2-0	Citron (FRA); Macias (PER); W 2-0	Lin (CHN); Kim (KOR); W 2-0	1QF	Lu (TPE); Lee (MAS); W 2-0	Narongrit (THA); Qin (CHN); W 2-0	Tsuneyama (JPN); Lee (TPE); W 2-0	1st place, gold medalist(s)

== Equestrian ==
Hong Kong qualified a rider.

Athlete	Horse	Event	Round 1		Round 2			Total	
Athlete	Horse	Event	Penalties	Rank	Penalties	Total	Rank	Penalties	Rank
Lennard Chiang	DJ	Individual Jumping	0	1	8	8	12	8	8
Australasia; Jake Hunter (AUS); Lennard Chiang (HKG); Sarrd Kalantari (IRI); Praveen Mathavan (MAS); Emily Fraser (NZL)	For The Star; DJ; Cristallo; Arkansas; Exilio	Team Jumping	12	4	8	20	5	20	5

== Fencing ==
Hong Kong qualified three athletes based on its performance at the 2014 FIE Cadet World Championships.

Boys

Athlete	Event	Pool Round	Seed	Round of 16	Quarterfinals	Semifinals	Final / BM	Rank
Athlete	Event	Opposition Score	Seed	Opposition Score	Opposition Score	Opposition Score	Opposition Score	Rank
Kei Hsu Chien	Épée	Pool 1 Unterhauser (GER) Limarev (RUS) Flygare (SWE); W Esztergalyos (HUN) Hassane (NIG); W 5-2; Shaheen (SYR); W 5-2	4	Hassane (NIG); W 15-7	Flygare (SWE); L 6-15	did not advance		6
Chun Yin Choi	Foil	Heroui (ALG) Bianchi (ITA) Seo (KOR) El-Choueiri (LIB); W 5-0; Huang (CHN) Rzadkowski (POL)				Roger (FRA); W 15-14	Rządkowski (POL); L 13-15	Silver medal

Girls

Athlete	Event	Pool Round	Seed	Round of 16	Quarterfinals	Semifinals	Final / BM	Rank
Athlete	Event	Opposition Score	Seed	Opposition Score	Opposition Score	Opposition Score	Opposition Score	Rank
Cheuk Yu Lau	Foil	Zhao (CAN) Elsharkawy (EGY) Martyanova (RUS) Borella (ITA) Szymczak (POL) Kontochristopoulou (GRE)		Cecchini (BRA); L 9-15	did not advance			

Mixed Team

Athletes	Event	Round of 16	Quarterfinals	Semifinals / PM	Final / PM	Rank
Athletes	Event	Opposition Score	Opposition Score	Opposition Score	Opposition Score	Rank
Asia-Oceania 1 Chien Kei Hsu Albert; Hong Kong; Choi Chun Yin Ryan; Hong Kong; Misaki Emura; Japan; Kim Dongju; South Korea; Lee Sinhee; South Korea; Karin Miyawaki; Japan	Mixed Team		Europe 4 W 30-22	Europe 2 W 30-29	Europe 1 W	1st place, gold medalist(s)

== Golf ==
Hong Kong qualified one team of two athletes based on the 8 June 2014 IGF Combined World Amateur Golf Rankings.

Individual

Athlete	Event	Round 1		Round 2			Round 3			Total	
Athlete	Event	Score	Rank	Score	Total	Rank	Score	Total	Rank	Score	Rank
Lucas Lam	Boys	79 (+7)	27	81 (+9)	160 (+16)		81 (+9)	241 (+25)		241	29
Kitty Tam	Girls	78 (+6)	25	70 (-2)	148 (+4)		75 (+3)	223 (+7)		223	17

Team

Athletes	Event	Round 1 (Foursome)		Round 2 (Fourball)			Round 3 (Individual Stroke)				Total	
Athletes	Event	Score	Rank	Score	Total	Rank	Boy	Girl	Total	Rank	Score	Rank
Lucas Lam; Kitty Tam	Mixed	68 (-4)	12	77 (+5)	145 (+1)		74 (+2)	75 (+3)	294 (+6)		294	23

== Sailing ==
Hong Kong qualified two boats based on its performance at the 2013 World Techno 293 Championships.

Athlete	Event	Race											Net Points	Final Rank
Athlete	Event	1	2	3	4	5	6	7	8	9	10	M*	Net Points	Final Rank
Tsz Kit Chan	Boys' Techno 293	8	5	(9)	3	4	3	17	Cancelled			49.00	40.00	8
Wing Chi Choi	Girls' Techno 293	5	(17)	10	11	6	9	8	Cancelled			66.00	49.00	6

== Swimming ==
Hong Kong qualified four swimmers.

Boys

Athlete	Event	Heat		Semifinal		Final	
Athlete	Event	Time	Rank	Time	Rank	Time	Rank
Shiu Yue Lau	50 m backstroke	26.79	18	did not advance			
Shiu Yue Lau	100 m backstroke	58.40	28	did not advance			
Shiu Yue Lau	200 m backstroke	2:10.70	28	—N/a		did not advance	
Sutton Choi	100 m breaststroke	1:07.56	35	did not advance			
Sutton Choi	200 m breaststroke	2:29.98	23	—N/a		did not advance	

Girls

Athlete	Event	Heat		Semifinal		Final	
Athlete	Event	Time	Rank	Time	Rank	Time	Rank
Siobhán Haughey	50 m freestyle	25.87	5 Q	25.69	6 Q	25.61	5
Siobhán Haughey	100 m freestyle	55.89	5 Q	55.56	8 Q	54.61	Silver medal
Siobhán Haughey	200 m freestyle	2:01.44	8 Q	—N/a		2:00.08	6
Siobhán Haughey	200 m individual medley	2:16.53	7 Q	—N/a		2:13.21	Silver medal
Jamie Yeung	50 m breaststroke	33.48	25	did not advance			
Jamie Yeung	100 m breaststroke	1:13.46	21	did not advance			
Jamie Yeung	200 m breaststroke	2:37.97	20	—N/a		did not advance	

Mixed

Athlete	Event	Heat		Final	
Athlete	Event	Time	Rank	Time	Rank
Sutton Choi; Siobhán Haughey; Shiu Yue Lau; Jamie Yeung	4 × 100 m freestyle relay	—N/a			
Sutton Choi; Siobhán Haughey; Shiu Yue Lau; Jamie Yeung	4 × 100 m medley relay	4:10.03	18	did not advance	

== Table Tennis ==
Hong Kong qualified a female athlete based on its performance at the 2014 World Qualification Event. Hong Kong later qualified a male athlete based on its performance at the Asian Qualification Event.

Singles

Athlete	Event	Group Stage	Rank	Round of 16	Quarterfinals	Semifinals	Final / BM	Rank
Athlete	Event	Opposition Score	Rank	Opposition Score	Opposition Score	Opposition Score	Opposition Score	Rank
Ka Tak Hung	Boys	Group H Al-Naggar (QAT); W 3 – 0	1 Q	Tenti (ARG); W 4 – 1	Fan (CHN); L 3 – 4	did not advance		5
Ka Tak Hung	Boys	Pucar (CRO); W 3 – 2	1 Q	Tenti (ARG); W 4 – 1	Fan (CHN); L 3 – 4	did not advance		5
Ka Tak Hung	Boys	Schmid (SUI); W 3 – 0	1 Q	Tenti (ARG); W 4 – 1	Fan (CHN); L 3 – 4	did not advance		5
Hoi Kem Doo	Girls	Group A Arvelo (VEN); W 3 – 0	1 Q	Trosman (ISR); W 4-0	Diaconu (ROU); W4-1	Zhang (USA); W 4-1	Liu (CHN); L 1-4	Silver medal
Hoi Kem Doo	Girls	Stefcova (CZE); W 3 – 0	1 Q	Trosman (ISR); W 4-0	Diaconu (ROU); W4-1	Zhang (USA); W 4-1	Liu (CHN); L 1-4	Silver medal
Hoi Kem Doo	Girls	Seera (UGA); W 3 – 0	1 Q	Trosman (ISR); W 4-0	Diaconu (ROU); W4-1	Zhang (USA); W 4-1	Liu (CHN); L 1-4	Silver medal

Team

Athletes	Event	Group Stage	Rank	Round of 16	Quarterfinals	Semifinals	Final / BM	Rank
Athletes	Event	Opposition Score	Rank	Opposition Score	Opposition Score	Opposition Score	Opposition Score	Rank
Hong Kong; Hoi Kem Doo (HKG); Ka Tak Hung (HKG)	Mixed	Belgium; Lung (BEL); Allegro (BEL); W 3 – 0	1 Q	Poland; Bajor (POL); Zatowka (POL); W 2 – 0	Croatia; Rakovac (CRO); Pucar (CRO); W 2 – 0	Japan; Muramatsu (JPN); Kato (JPN); L 2 – 1	Thailand; Khetkhuan (THA); Tanviriyavechakul (THA); W 2 – 0	3rd place, bronze medalist(s)
Hong Kong; Hoi Kem Doo (HKG); Ka Tak Hung (HKG)	Mixed	Hungary; Imre (HUN); Szudi (HUN); W 3 – 0	1 Q	Poland; Bajor (POL); Zatowka (POL); W 2 – 0	Croatia; Rakovac (CRO); Pucar (CRO); W 2 – 0	Japan; Muramatsu (JPN); Kato (JPN); L 2 – 1	Thailand; Khetkhuan (THA); Tanviriyavechakul (THA); W 2 – 0	3rd place, bronze medalist(s)
Hong Kong; Hoi Kem Doo (HKG); Ka Tak Hung (HKG)	Mixed	Intercontinental 2 Dong (NZL); Johnson (SKN); W 3 – 0	1 Q	Poland; Bajor (POL); Zatowka (POL); W 2 – 0	Croatia; Rakovac (CRO); Pucar (CRO); W 2 – 0	Japan; Muramatsu (JPN); Kato (JPN); L 2 – 1	Thailand; Khetkhuan (THA); Tanviriyavechakul (THA); W 2 – 0	3rd place, bronze medalist(s)

Qualification Legend: Q=Main Bracket (medal); qB=Consolation Bracket (non-medal)

== Triathlon ==
Hong Kong qualified two athletes based on its performance at the 2014 Asian Youth Olympic Games Qualifier.

Individual

Athlete	Event	Swim (750m)	Trans 1	Bike (20 km)	Trans 2	Run (5 km)	Total Time	Rank
Michael Lam	Boys	9:30	0:45	29:25	0:26	17:19	57:25	16
Cheuk Yi Hung	Girls	10:41	0:51	34:37	0:30	21:53	1:08:32	30

Relay

Athlete	Event	Total Times per Athlete (Swim 250m, Bike 6.6 km, Run 1.8 km)	Total Group Time	Rank
Asia 1 Minami Kubono (JPN); Lam Michael (HKG); Kim Gyuri (KOR); Lee Gyuhyung (KOR)	Mixed Relay	21:43; 20:06; 23:10; 21:41	1:26:40	8
Asia 3 Cheuk Yi Hung (HKG); Yin-Cheng Chi (TPE); Victorija Deldio (PHI); Arman Kydyrtayev (KAZ)	Mixed Relay	23:29; 22:07; 25:15; 22:20	1:33:11	15
