= Vladyslava Lesnaya =

Ukrainian badminton player (born 1996)

Personal information
- Born: Vladyslava Ruslanivna Lesnaya; 16 June 1996 (age 30) Kharkiv, Ukraine
- Height: 1.70 m (5 ft 7 in)

Sport
- Country: Ukraine
- Sport: Badminton
- Handedness: Right
- Coached by: Andriy Diptan; Sterin Mykhaylo

Women's singles & doubles
- Highest ranking: 254 (WS 14 September 2017); 115 (WD 13 July 2017)
- BWF profile

Vladyslava Ruslanivna Lesnaya (Ukrainian: Владислава Русланівна Лісна; born 16 June 1996) is a Ukrainian badminton player. She competed at the 2014 Summer Youth Olympics in Nanjing, China.

== Achievements ==
=== BWF International Challenge/Series ===
Women's doubles
Year	Tournament	Partner	Opponent	Score	Result
2016	Slovak Open	(Ukraine) Darya Samarchants	(Bulgaria) Mariya Mitsova (Bulgaria) Petya Nedelcheva	5–11, 4–11, 3–11	(silver) Runner-up

BWF International Challenge tournament
BWF International Series tournament
BWF Future Series tournament
