= Yavor Peshleevski =

Bulgarian modern pentathlete

Personal information
- Nationality: Bulgarian
- Born: 29 June 1996 (age 30)

Sport
- Country: Bulgaria
- Sport: Modern pentathlon
Medal record
World Championships
Bronze medal – third place	2018 Mexico City	Relay

Yavor Peshleevski (Bulgarian: Явор Пешлеевски) (born 29 June 1996) is a Bulgarian modern pentathlete.

He participated at the 2018 World Modern Pentathlon Championships, winning a medal.
