= Luis Enrique Peñalver =

Spanish badminton player (born 1996)

Personal information
- Born: Luis Enrique Peñalver Pereira; 10 February 1996 (age 30) Toledo, Spain
- Height: 1.78 m (5 ft 10 in)
- Weight: 70 kg (154 lb)

Sport
- Country: Spain
- Sport: Badminton

Men's singles
- Highest ranking: 47 (24 January 2021)
- Current ranking: 79 (26 December 2023)
- BWF profile
Medal record
Men's badminton
Representing Spain
Mediterranean Games
Silver medal – second place	2022 Oran	Men's singles
Silver medal – second place	2022 Oran	Men's doubles
European Junior Championships
Gold medal – first place	2015 Lubin	Mixed team

Luis Enrique Peñalver Pereira (Note: In this Spanish name, the first or paternal surname is Peñalver and the second or maternal family name is Pereira.) (Spanish pronunciation: [lwis enˈrike peɲalˈβeɾ]; born 10 February 1996) is a Spanish badminton player. He competed at the 2014 Summer Youth Olympics in Nanjing, China and was part of the Spanish national junior team that won the gold medal at the 2015 European Junior Championships in the mixed team event. In 2017, he won his first senior title at the Romanian International tournament in the men's singles event.

== Achievements ==
=== Mediterranean Games ===
Men's singles
Year	Venue	Opponent	Score	Result	Ref.
2022	Multipurpose Omnisports Hall; Oued Tlélat, Algeria	(Spain) Pablo Abián	13–21, 20–22	Silver	

Men's doubles
Year	Venue	Partner	Opponent	Score	Result	Ref.
2022	Multipurpose Omnisports Hall; Oued Tlélat, Algeria	(Spain) Pablo Abián	(Algeria) Koceila Mammeri (Algeria) Youcef Sabri Medel	21–14, 19–21, 16–21	Silver	

=== BWF International Challenge/Series (5 titles, 3 runners-up) ===
Men's singles
Year	Tournament	Opponent	Score	Result	Ref.
2017	Romanian International	(France) Pierrick Cajot	21–15, 21–17	(gold) Winner	
2017	Spanish International	(Japan) Yu Igarashi	13–21, 14–21	(silver) Runner-up	
2018	Norwegian International	(Denmark) Rasmus Messerschmidt	12–21, 16–21	(silver) Runner-up	
2018	Welsh International	(England) Alex Lane	21–19, 22–20	(gold) Winner	
2019	Turkey Open	(Canada) Brian Yang	21–19, 21–19	(gold) Winner	
2021	Mexican International	(Mexico) Luis Montoya	21–10, 21–12	(gold) Winner	
2022	Maldives International	(Israel) Misha Zilberman	21–7, 11–21, 21–18	(gold) Winner	
2022	Peru Challenge	(Canada) Jason Ho-Shue	19–21, 23–21, 21–23	(silver) Runner-up	

BWF International Challenge tournament
BWF International Series tournament
BWF Future Series tournament
