= Nanjing Sport Institute =

Chinese sports and physical education university

- 南京体育学院
- Type: Public/National
- Established: 1956
- Academic staff: 514
- Students: 7,032
- Location: Nanjing, Jiangsu, China
- Campus: Urban
- Website: www.nipes.cn

Nanjing Sport Institute (南京体育学院) is a public university located in Nanjing, Jiangsu, China, specializing in sports and physical education. It was founded in 1956. It has national responsibility for Elites athletes training and physical education, also research related within sports sciences.

== Campus ==
The institute have three main sites in the Nanjing:

1. Central area (also name Linggu Temple area)
2. Xianlin area
3. Wukesong area

Central area responsible for several significant heritage of stadium with Republic of China(1912—1949).

== Alumni who have won Olympic golds ==
- Luan Jujie,
- Lin Li,
- Ge Fei,
- Gu Jun,
- Zhang Jun,
- Huang Xu,
- Li Ju,
- Yan Sen,
- Chen Qi,
- Chen Ruolin,
- Zhong Man,
- Lu Chunlong,
- Luo Xiaojuan,
- Xu Anqi,
- Cai Yun
