= Phạm Cao Cường =

Vietnamese badminton player

Personal information
- Born: 30 May 1996 (age 30) Thái Bình Province, Vietnam
- Height: 1.80 m (5 ft 11 in)

Sport
- Country: Vietnam
- Sport: Badminton
- Handedness: Right

Men's singles
- Highest ranking: 73 (8 January 2019)
- Current ranking: 145 (8 February 2022)
- BWF profile

Phạm Cao Cường (born 30 May 1996) is a Vietnamese badminton player. He showed his potential as a badminton player when he was young, and at age 16, was in the top 8 at the National Championships in the men's singles event. His parents and the Ho Chi Minh City Sports Department sent him to be trained in Indonesia. He was the runner-up at the U-19 Korea Junior Open in 2013. He competed at the 2014 Summer Youth Olympics and Asian Games. He was the champion at the 2018 Iran Fajr International by defeating his senior teammate Nguyễn Tiến Minh in the final.

== Achievements ==
=== BWF International Challenge/Series (2 titles, 1 runner-up) ===
Men's singles
| Year | Tournament | Opponent | Score | Result |
|---|---|---|---|---|
| 2018 | Iran Fajr International | (Vietnam) Nguyễn Tiến Minh | 15–14, 13–11, 11–13, 11–7 | (gold) Winner |
| 2018 | Bangladesh International | (Malaysia) Soo Teck Zhi | 17–21, 17–21 | (silver) Runner-up |
| 2019 | Nepal International | (Thailand) Adulrach Namkul | 24–22, 9–21, 21–19 | (gold) Winner |

BWF International Challenge tournament
BWF International Series tournament
BWF Future Series tournament
