= Max Weißkirchen =

German badminton player (born 1996)

Personal information
- Born: 18 October 1996 (age 30) Bonn, Germany
- Height: 1.87 m (6 ft 2 in)

Sport
- Country: Germany
- Sport: Badminton
- Handedness: Right

Men's singles & doubles
- Highest ranking: 50 (MS 11 October 2022); 458 (MD 3 September 2015)
- Current ranking: 81 (MS 31 January 2023)
- BWF profile
Medal record
Men's badminton
Representing Germany
European Mixed Team Championships
Silver medal – second place	2019 Copenhagen	Mixed team
Bronze medal – third place	2021 Vantaa	Mixed team
European Men's Team Championships
Bronze medal – third place	2016 Kazan	Men's team
Bronze medal – third place	2018 Kazan	Men's team
European Junior Championships
Gold medal – first place	2015 Lubin	Mixed doubles
Silver medal – second place	2015 Lubin	Boys' singles
Bronze medal – third place	2013 Ankara	Mixed team

Max Weißkirchen (born 18 October 1996) is a German badminton player. He participated at the 2014 Summer Youth Olympics in Nanjing, China. Weißkirchen won gold and silver medals at the 2015 European Junior Championships in mixed doubles and boys' singles events respectively.

== Achievements ==
=== European Junior Championships ===
Boys' singles
Year	Venue	Opponent	Score	Result
2015	Regional Sport Centrum Hall; Lubin, Poland	(Denmark) Anders Antonsen	9–21, 21–15, 9–21	Silver

Mixed doubles
Year	Venue	Partner	Opponent	Score	Result
2015	Regional Sport Centrum Hall; Lubin, Poland	(Germany) Eva Janssens	(Denmark) Frederik Søgaard (Denmark) Sara Lundgaard	19–21, 21–12, 21–18	Gold

=== BWF International Challenge/Series (1 title, 6 runners-up) ===
Men's singles
Year	Tournament	Opponent	Score	Result
2019	Croatian International	(India) B. M. Rahul Bharadwaj	21–12, 20–22, 14–21	(silver) Runner-up
2019	German International	(France) Arnaud Merklé	20–22, 12–21	(silver) Runner-up
2020	Austrian Open	(Spain) Pablo Abián	22–20, 21–15	(gold) Winner
2021	Portugal International	(Denmark) Ditlev Jæger Holm	15–21, 17–21	(silver) Runner-up

Men's doubles
Year	Tournament	Partner	Opponent	Score	Result
2023	Réunion Open	(Germany) Matthias Kicklitz	(India) Krishna Prasad Garaga (India) Vishnuvardhan Goud Panjala	18–21, 12–21	(silver) Runner-up

Mixed doubles
Year	Tournament	Partner	Opponent	Score	Result
2014	Welsh International	(Germany) Eva Janssens	(England) Chris Coles (England) Sophie Brown	21–18, 16–21, 14–21	(silver) Runner-up
2015	Estonian International	(Germany) Eva Janssens	(Denmark) Kasper Antonsen (Denmark) Amanda Madsen	17–21, 16–21	(silver) Runner-up

BWF International Challenge tournament
BWF International Series tournament
BWF Future Series tournament
