= Aditya Joshi =

Indian badminton player

Personal information
- Born: 7 August 1996 (age 30)

Sport
- Country: India
- Sport: Badminton
- BWF profile

Aditya Joshi (born 7 August 1996) is an Indian badminton player. He is the first male Indian junior badminton player who ranked first place in the world junior rankings.

== Career ==
Joshi comes from Uttarakhand, India. Joshi got the number one slot in the junior rankings of the World Badminton Federation in January 2014. He was at the 11th position till November 2013, but he managed to jump ahead of all the players by achieving 18,776 points and got top ranked in the world. Joshi was the junior national champion in year 2013 and had won two gold medals in Indian junior international tournament. In 2012 he participated at the India Open Grand Prix Gold.

Aditya started playing badminton in 2001 when he was only five and very soon, he started winning in the categories above his age in the local tournaments. He clinched the gold in Remensco Junior International tournament held in Russia in 2011. During the same year, he won a gold medal in Asian Sub-Junior championship held in Japan.

== Achievements ==
=== BWF International ===
Men's singles
Year	Tournament	Opponent	Score	Result
2016	Bahrain International	(India) Pratul Joshi	17–21, 21–12, 15–21	(silver) Runner-up
2017	Ethiopia International	(Israel) Misha Zilberman	7–21, 19–21	(silver) Runner-up

BWF International Challenge tournament
BWF International Series tournament
BWF Future Series tournament

=== BWF Junior International ===
Boys' singles
Year	Tournament	Opponent	Score	Result
2011	Ramenskoe Junior International	(Russia) Sergey Sirant	16–21, 18–21	(silver) Runner-up
2013	India Junior International	(India) M. Kanishq	22–20, 21–15	(gold) Winner

Boys' doubles
Year	Tournament	Partner	Opponent	Score	Result
2011	Ramenskoe Junior International	(India) Harsheel Dani	(Russia) Kirill Boyarsky (Russia) Dmitry Imankulov	21–19, 18–21, 21–16	(gold) Winner
2013	India Junior International	(India) Arun George	(India) M. R. Arjun (India) Chirag Shetty	21–17, 21–12	(gold) Winner

BWF Junior International Grand Prix tournament
BWF Junior International Challenge tournament
BWF Junior International Series tournament
BWF Junior Future Series tournament
