= Muhammed Ali Kurt =

Turkish badminton player (born 1996)

Personal information
- Born: 18 April 1996 (age 30)
- Height: 1.80 m (5 ft 11 in)
- Weight: 80 kg (176 lb)

Sport
- Country: Turkey
- Sport: Badminton

Men's singles & doubles
- Highest ranking: 123 (MS 26 July 2018); 245 (MD 8 July 2016); 224 (XD 23 October 2014)
- BWF profile
Medal record
Men's badminton
Representing Turkey
European Junior Championships
Bronze medal – third place	2015 Lubin	Boys' singles

Muhammed Ali Kurt (born 18 April 1996) is a Turkish badminton player who educated at the Erzincan University. He competed at the 2018 Mediterranean Games.

== Achievements ==
=== European Junior Championships ===
Boys' singles
Year	Venue	Opponent	Score	Result
2015	Regional Sport Centrum Hall; Lubin, Poland	(Germany) Max Weißkirchen	18–21, 25–23, 21–23	Bronze

=== BWF International Challenge/Series ===
Men's singles
Year	Tournament	Opponent	Score	Result
2017	Bulgarian International	(India) R. M. V. Gurusaidutt	17–21, 16–21	(silver) Runner-up
2017	Turkey International	(France) Lucas Claerbout	16–21, 10–21	(silver) Runner-up

Men's doubles
Year	Tournament	Partner	Opponent	Score	Result
2016	Bulgarian International	(Turkey) Mert Tunço	(Bulgaria) Daniel Nikolov (Bulgaria) Ivan Rusev	13–21, 18–21	(silver) Runner-up

Mixed doubles
Year	Tournament	Partner	Opponent	Score	Result
2015	Uganda International	(Turkey) Kader İnal	(India) Tarun Kona (India) N. Sikki Reddy	6–11, 4–11, 6–11	(silver) Runner-up

BWF International Challenge tournament
BWF International Series tournament
BWF Future Series tournament
