= 3x3 basketball at the 2014 Summer Youth Olympics =

3x3 basketball at the II Summer Youth Olympic Games
- Venue: Wutaishan Sports Center
- Dates: 18–26 August
- No. of events: 4 (2 boys, 2 girls)

Basketball at the 2014 Summer Youth Olympics was held from 18 to 26 August at the Wutaishan Sports Center in Nanjing, China. As in 2010 the 3x3 format returned, along with a new event, the skill challenge.

== Qualification ==
Each National Olympic Committee (NOC) could enter a maximum of 2 teams, 1 team of 4 athletes per each gender. As hosts, China was given 2 teams, 1 per each gender. 6 teams, 3 per each gender qualified at the 2013 U18 3x3 World Championships and another 6 teams, 3 per each gender qualified from the 2013 3x3 World Tour Final. The remaining 13 teams per gender qualified based on the FIBA 3x3 National Federation Ranking based on the update from 1 June 2014. All continents must have at least one team present in each gender and no more than 10 from the same continent can participate. A minimum of 30 NOCs must participate across all events.

To be eligible to participate at the 2014 Youth Olympics athletes must have been born between 1 January 1996 and 31 December 1997. Furthermore, all team members must have participated in two FIBA sanctioned 3x3 events between 1 April 2013 and 8 June 2014.

=== Boys ===
Event	Location	Date	Total Places	Qualified
Host Nation	-	-	1	China
2013 U18 3x3 World Championships	(Indonesia) Jakarta	26–29 September 2013	3	Argentina; France; Russia
2013 3x3 World Tour Final	(Turkey) Istanbul	4–5 October 2013	3	Romania; Slovenia; Venezuela
FIBA 3x3 National Federation Ranking	-	1 June 2014	13	Andorra; Brazil; Germany; Guatemala; Hungary; Indonesia; Lithuania; New Zealand; Poland; Puerto Rico; Spain; Tunisia; Uruguay
TOTAL			20	

=== Girls ===
Event	Location	Date	Total Places	Qualified
Host Nation	-	-	1	China
2013 U18 3x3 World Championships	(Indonesia) Jakarta	27–29 September 2013	3	Estonia; Spain; United States
2013 3x3 World Tour Final	(Turkey) Istanbul	4–5 October 2013	3	Romania; Slovenia; Venezuela
FIBA 3x3 National Federation Ranking	-	1 June 2014	13	Andorra; Belgium; Brazil; Chinese Taipei; Czech Republic; Egypt; Germany; Guam; Hungary; Indonesia; Netherlands; Syria; Thailand
TOTAL			20	

== Format ==
The boys' and girls' tournament will adopt a round robin group stage and a single-elimination medal round, where the 20 participating teams are split into 2 pools of 10. Each team will play once against the other teams in its pool, and the top 8 teams from each pool will qualify for the knock-out stages.

=== Boys ===
Pool A	Pool B
Hungary	Andorra
Germany	Spain
Uruguay	Brazil
Lithuania	Romania
Poland	New Zealand
France	Guatemala
Puerto Rico	Venezuela
Indonesia	Argentina
China	Tunisia
Slovenia	Guam

=== Girls ===
Note: Guam entered a girls' basketball team into Group B of the competition; there was no Guam boys' team at the tournament

Pool A	Pool B
Hungary	Belgium
Spain	Andorra
Germany	Chinese Taipei
Brazil	Czech Republic
Netherlands	United States
China	Romania
Estonia	India
Venezuela	Egypt
Syria	Thailand
Slovenia	Russia

== Schedule ==
The schedule was released by the Nanjing Youth Olympic Games Organizing Committee.

All times are CST (UTC+8)

Event date	Event day	Starting time	Event details
August 18	Monday	17:00	Boys' Tournament: Group Stage; Girls' Tournament: Group Stage
August 19	Tuesday	17:00	Boys' Tournament: Group Stage; Girls' Tournament: Group Stage
August 20	Wednesday	17:00	Boys' Tournament: Group Stage; Girls' Tournament: Group Stage
August 21	Thursday	19:30	Boys' Dunk Contest; Girls' Shoot-Out Contest
August 22	Friday	17:00	Boys' Tournament: Group Stage; Girls' Tournament: Group Stage
August 23	Saturday	17:00	Boys' Tournament: Group Stage; Girls' Tournament: Group Stage
August 24	Sunday	17:00	Boys' Tournament: Group Stage; Girls' Tournament: Group Stage
August 25	Monday	17:00	Boys' Tournament: Round of 16; Girls' Tournament: Round of 16; Boys' Tournament: Quarterfinals; Girls' Tournament: Quarterfinals
August 26	Tuesday	17:30	Boys' Tournament: Semifinals; Girls' Tournament: Semifinals; Boys' Tournament: Medal Matches; Girls' Tournament: Medal Matches

== Medal summary ==
=== Medal table ===
* Host nation (China)

Rank	Nation	Gold	Silver	Bronze	Total
1	France	1	1	0	2
2	Spain	1	0	1	2
2	United States	1	0	1	2
4	Lithuania	1	0	0	1
5	Slovenia	0	2	0	2
6	Netherlands	0	1	0	1
7	Argentina	0	0	1	1
7	China*	0	0	1	1
Totals (8 entries)		4	4	4	12

=== Results ===
Event	Gold	Silver	Bronze
Boys' tournament	Lithuania; Jonas Lekšas; Martynas Sajus; Justas Vazalis; Kristupas Žemaitis	France; Teddy Cheremond; Lucas Dussoulier; Elie Fedensieu; Karim Mouliom	Argentina; Michel Divoy; Rodrigo Gerhardt; Juan Pablo Lugrin; José Vildoza
Girls' tournament	United States; De'Janae Boykin; Napheesa Collier; Arike Ogunbowale; Katie Samuelson	Netherlands; Esther Fokke; Fleur Kuijt; Janis Ndiba; Charlotte van Kleef	Spain; Ana Calvo; Laia Flores; Helena Orts; Lucía Togores
Boys' dunk contest	Karim Mouliom; France	Žiga Lah; Slovenia	Fu Lei; China
Girls' shoot-out contest	Lucía Togores; Spain	Ela Mićunović; Slovenia	Katie Samuelson; United States
