= 3x3 Basketball at the 2014 Summer Youth Olympics – Girls' tournament =

Tournament details
- Host country: China
- City: Nanjing
- Dates: 18–26 August
- Teams: 20

Final positions
- Champions: United States (1st title)
- Runners-up: Netherlands
- Third place: Spain
- Fourth place: Hungary

Basketball at the 2014 Summer Youth Olympics took place at the Wutaishan Sports Center in Nanjing, China.

== Participating teams ==
Group A

- Brazil
- China
- Estonia
- Germany
- Hungary
- Netherlands
- Slovenia
- Spain
- Syria
- Venezuela

Group B

- Andorra
- Belgium
- Chinese Taipei
- Czech Republic
- Egypt
- Guam
- Indonesia
- Romania
- Thailand
- United States

== Preliminary round ==
=== Group A ===
Pos	Team	Pld	W	D	L	PF	PA	PD	Pts	Qualification
1	Netherlands	9	8	0	1	164	87	+77	24	Round of 16
2	Hungary	9	8	0	1	146	91	+55	24	Round of 16
3	Spain	9	7	0	2	151	95	+56	21	Round of 16
4	Estonia	9	5	0	4	130	109	+21	15	Round of 16
5	China	9	5	0	4	128	103	+25	15	Round of 16
6	Germany	9	4	0	5	111	133	−22	12	Round of 16
7	Brazil	9	3	0	6	101	123	−22	9	Round of 16
8	Venezuela	9	2	0	7	101	153	−52	6	Round of 16
9	Slovenia	9	2	0	7	120	156	−36	6	Eliminated
10	Syria	9	1	0	8	68	170	−102	3	Eliminated

18 August 2014
18:40

Hungary	18–12	Slovenia

Wutaishan Sports Center, Nanjing

18 August 2014
19:00

Report

Spain	21–4	Syria

Wutaishan Sports Center, Nanjing

18 August 2014
19:20

Germany	12–10	Venezuela
Pts: Kuper 5		Pts: Padilla, Garcia 4

Wutaishan Sports Center, Nanjing

18 August 2014
19:40

Brazil	2–15	Estonia

Wutaishan Sports Center, Nanjing

18 August 2014
20:00

Netherlands	7–13	China

Wutaishan Sports Center, Nanjing

19 August 2014
17:00

Report

Syria	9–17	Germany
Pts: Assad 5		Pts: Rodefeld 8

Wutaishan Sports Center, Nanjing

19 August 2014
17:20

Estonia	12–21	Netherlands

Wutaishan Sports Center, Nanjing

19 August 2014
17:40

Venezuela	12–10	Brazil

Wutaishan Sports Center, Nanjing

19 August 2014
18:00

Slovenia	18–20	China

Wutaishan Sports Center, Nanjing

19 August 2014
18:20

Hungary	16–11	Spain

Wutaishan Sports Center, Nanjing

19 August 2014
20:20

Netherlands	22–9	Venezuela

Wutaishan Sports Center, Nanjing

19 August 2014
20:40

Germany	7–15	Hungary
Pts: Rodefeld 3		Pts: Aho, Nagy 6

Wutaishan Sports Center, Nanjing

19 August 2014
21:00

Report

Brazil	19–7	Syria

Wutaishan Sports Center, Nanjing

19 August 2014
21:20

Spain	21–7	Slovenia

Wutaishan Sports Center, Nanjing

19 August 2014
21:40

China	11–15	Estonia

Wutaishan Sports Center, Nanjing

20 August 2014
18:40

Report

Syria	4–21	Netherlands

Wutaishan Sports Center, Nanjing

20 August 2014
19:00

Venezuela	9–21	China

Wutaishan Sports Center, Nanjing

20 August 2014
19:20

Slovenia	14–16	Estonia

Wutaishan Sports Center, Nanjing

20 August 2014
19:40

Hungary	21–12	Brazil

Wutaishan Sports Center, Nanjing

20 August 2014
20:00

Spain	16–13	Germany
Pts: Orts i Martinez 7		Pts: Brossmann 6

Wutaishan Sports Center, Nanjing

22 August 2014
17:00

Report

China	20–7	Syria

Wutaishan Sports Center, Nanjing

22 August 2014
17:20

Germany	13–18	Slovenia
Pts: Brossmann 7		Pts: Micunovic 13

Wutaishan Sports Center, Nanjing

22 August 2014
17:40

Netherlands	18–8	Hungary

Wutaishan Sports Center, Nanjing

22 August 2014
18:00

Brazil	7–16	Spain

Wutaishan Sports Center, Nanjing

22 August 2014
18:20

Estonia	16–7	Venezuela

Wutaishan Sports Center, Nanjing

22 August 2014
20:40

Report

Syria	5–21	Estonia

Wutaishan Sports Center, Nanjing

22 August 2014
20:40

Hungary	14–11	China

Wutaishan Sports Center, Nanjing

22 August 2014
21:00

Slovenia	15–16	Venezuela

Wutaishan Sports Center, Nanjing

22 August 2014
21:20

Spain	12–13	Netherlands

Wutaishan Sports Center, Nanjing

22 August 2014
21:40

Germany	16–11	Brazil
Pts: Rodefeld 7		Pts: Moura Quieroz Dias 7

Wutaishan Sports Center, Nanjing

23 August 2014
18:40

Report

Venezuela	16–17	Syria

Wutaishan Sports Center, Nanjing

23 August 2014
19:00

Netherlands	20–10	Germany
Pts: Fokke 7		Pts: Rodefeld 6

Wutaishan Sports Center, Nanjing

23 August 2014
19:20

China	8–13	Spain

Wutaishan Sports Center, Nanjing

23 August 2014
19:40

Estonia	10–12	Hungary

Wutaishan Sports Center, Nanjing

23 August 2014
20:00

Brazil	20–9	Slovenia

Wutaishan Sports Center, Nanjing

24 August 2014
17:00

Germany	6–18	China
Pts: Brossmann 4		Pts: Wang 9

Wutaishan Sports Center, Nanjing

24 August 2014
17:20

Hungary	19–5	Venezuela

Wutaishan Sports Center, Nanjing

24 August 2014
17:40

Spain	20–11	Estonia

Wutaishan Sports Center, Nanjing

24 August 2014
18:00

Report

Slovenia	14–11	Syria

Wutaishan Sports Center, Nanjing

24 August 2014
18:20

Brazil	6–21	Netherlands

Wutaishan Sports Center, Nanjing

24 August 2014
20:20

Estonia	14–17	Germany
Pts: Lass 11		Pts: Rodefeld 8

Wutaishan Sports Center, Nanjing

24 August 2014
20:40

China	6–14	Brazil

Wutaishan Sports Center, Nanjing

24 August 2014
21:00

Netherlands	21–13	Slovenia

Wutaishan Sports Center, Nanjing

24 August 2014
21:20

Venezuela	17–21	Spain

Wutaishan Sports Center, Nanjing

24 August 2014
21:40

Report

Syria	5–21	Hungary

Wutaishan Sports Center, Nanjing

=== Group B ===
Pos	Team	Pld	W	D	L	PF	PA	PD	Pts	Qualification
1	United States	9	9	0	0	190	54	+136	27	Round of 16
2	Belgium	9	7	0	2	136	75	+61	21	Round of 16
3	Thailand	9	6	0	3	96	102	−6	18	Round of 16
4	Czech Republic	9	6	0	3	140	106	+34	18	Round of 16
5	Chinese Taipei	9	5	0	4	124	114	+10	15	Round of 16
6	Romania	9	5	0	4	118	102	+16	15	Round of 16
7	Egypt	9	4	0	5	125	127	−2	12	Round of 16
8	Guam	9	2	0	7	77	151	−74	6	Round of 16
9	Andorra	9	1	0	8	76	161	−85	3	Eliminated
10	Indonesia	9	0	0	9	66	156	−90	0	Eliminated

18 August 2014
18:40

Report

Belgium	22–7	Guam

Wutaishan Sports Center, Nanjing

18 August 2014
19:00

Andorra	10–13	Thailand
Pts: Brunet, Mana 3		Pts: Bunsinprom 6

Wutaishan Sports Center, Nanjing

18 August 2014
19:20

Chinese Taipei	14–16	Egypt

Wutaishan Sports Center, Nanjing

18 August 2014
19:40

Czech Republic	16–9	Indonesia

Wutaishan Sports Center, Nanjing

18 August 2014
20:00

United States	21–3	Romania
Pts: Napheesa Collier 11		Pts: Ana Ferariu 2

Wutaishan Sports Center, Nanjing
Referees: Ningpeng Yuan / Xiaoguang Yang

19 August 2014
17:00

Thailand	10–14	Chinese Taipei

Wutaishan Sports Center, Nanjing

19 August 2014
17:20

Indonesia	2–21	United States

Wutaishan Sports Center, Nanjing

19 August 2014
17:40

Egypt	10–19	Czech Republic

Wutaishan Sports Center, Nanjing

19 August 2014
18:00

Report

Guam	3–16	Romania
Pts: Destiny Castro 2		Pts: Ana Ferariu 8

Wutaishan Sports Center, Nanjing
Referees: Lei Zheng / Jing Shi

19 August 2014
18:20

Belgium	22–1	Andorra
Pts: Verelst 10		Pts: Navarro 1

Wutaishan Sports Center, Nanjing

19 August 2014
20:20

United States	21–6	Egypt

Wutaishan Sports Center, Nanjing

19 August 2014
20:40

Chinese Taipei	11–13	Belgium

Wutaishan Sports Center, Nanjing

19 August 2014
21:00

Czech Republic	12–15	Thailand

Wutaishan Sports Center, Nanjing

19 August 2014
21:20

Report

Andorra	8–18	Guam
Pts: Brunet 4		Pts: Castro 12

Wutaishan Sports Center, Nanjing

19 August 2014
21:40

Romania	20–8	Indonesia
Pts: Iringo Debraczi 9		Pts: Regita Pramesti 5

Wutaishan Sports Center, Nanjing
Referees: Jing Shi / Xiaoguang Yang

20 August 2014
18:40

Thailand	5–21	United States

Wutaishan Sports Center, Nanjing

20 August 2014
19:00

Egypt	11–13	Romania
Pts: Raneem Elgedawy 6		Pts: Ana Ferariu 6

Wutaishan Sports Center, Nanjing
Referees: Ningpeng Yuan / Jing Shi

20 August 2014
19:20

Report

Guam	14–11	Indonesia

Wutaishan Sports Center, Nanjing

20 August 2014
19:40

Belgium	16–6	Czech Republic

Wutaishan Sports Center, Nanjing

20 August 2014
20:00

Andorra	13–16	Chinese Taipei
Pts: Brunet 6		Pts: Huang 8

Wutaishan Sports Center, Nanjing

22 August 2014
17:00

Romania	16–4	Thailand
Pts: Kincso Kelemen 5		Pts: Amphawa Thuamon, Rujiwan Bunsinprom 2

Wutaishan Sports Center, Nanjing
Referees: Jing Shi/ Ningpeng Yuan

22 August 2014
17:20

Report

Chinese Taipei	21–9	Guam

Wutaishan Sports Center, Nanjing

22 August 2014
17:40

United States	21–6	Belgium

Wutaishan Sports Center, Nanjing

22 August 2014
18:00

Czech Republic	21–7	Andorra
Pts: Berankova 7		Pts: Navarro 5

Wutaishan Sports Center, Nanjing

22 August 2014
18:20

Indonesia	11–18	Egypt

Wutaishan Sports Center, Nanjing

22 August 2014
20:20

Thailand	16–9	Indonesia

Wutaishan Sports Center, Nanjing

22 August 2014
20:20

Belgium	12–10	Romania
Pts: Aline Kristine Jos Verelst 5		Pts: Kincso Kelemen 6

Wutaishan Sports Center, Nanjing
Referees: Lei Zheng / Xiaoguang Yang

22 August 2014
21:00

Report

Guam	8–21	Egypt

Wutaishan Sports Center, Nanjing

22 August 2014
21:20

Andorra	5–22	United States
Pts: Brunet, Vidal 2		Pts: Ogunbowale 9

Wutaishan Sports Center, Nanjing

22 August 2014
21:40

Chinese Taipei	12–14	Czech Republic

Wutaishan Sports Center, Nanjing

23 August 2014
18:40

Egypt	12–15	Thailand

Wutaishan Sports Center, Nanjing

23 August 2014
19:00

United States	21–5	Chinese Taipei

Wutaishan Sports Center, Nanjing

23 August 2014
19:20

Romania	18–8	Andorra
Pts: Beatrice Timea Peter 6		Pts: Anna Mana Buscall 3

Wutaishan Sports Center, Nanjing
Referees: Ikuko Kozakai / Xiaoguang Yang

23 August 2014
19:40

Indonesia	1–22	Belgium

Wutaishan Sports Center, Nanjing

23 August 2014
20:00

Report

Czech Republic	21–7	Guam

Wutaishan Sports Center, Nanjing

24 August 2014
17:00

Chinese Taipei	16–13	Romania
Pts: Pin Lo 11		Pts: Ana Ferariu 7

Wutaishan Sports Center, Nanjing
Referees: Jing Shi / Ningpeng Yuan

24 August 2014
17:20

Belgium	16–10	Egypt

Wutaishan Sports Center, Nanjing

24 August 2014
17:40

Andorra	14–10	Indonesia
Pts: Brunet 8		Pts: Elvira 4

Wutaishan Sports Center, Nanjing

24 August 2014
18:00

Report

Guam	1–10	Thailand

Wutaishan Sports Center, Nanjing

24 August 2014
18:20

Czech Republic	12–21	United States

Wutaishan Sports Center, Nanjing

24 August 2014
20:20

Indonesia	5–15	Chinese Taipei

Wutaishan Sports Center, Nanjing

24 August 2014
20:40

Romania	9–19	Czech Republic
Pts: Ana Ferariu 5		Pts: Gabriela Andelova 6

Wutaishan Sports Center, Nanjing
Referees: Ilona Kucerova / Lei Zheng

24 August 2014
21:00

Report

United States	21–10	Guam

Wutaishan Sports Center, Nanjing

24 August 2014
21:20

Egypt	21–10	Andorra
Pts: El-Gedawy 8		Pts: Brunet 5

Wutaishan Sports Center, Nanjing

24 August 2014
21:40

Thailand	8–7	Belgium

Wutaishan Sports Center, Nanjing

== Knockout round ==
Round of 16
25 August
Germany	9
Thailand	5
25 August
Egypt	18
Hungary	20
25 August
Chinese Taipei	10
Estonia	14
25 August
Venezuela	7
United States	21
25 August
Romania	14
Spain	18
25 August
Brazil	16
Belgium	20
25 August
China	15
Czech Republic	12
25 August
Guam	1
Netherlands	17

Quarter-finals
25 August
Germany	13
Hungary	20
25 August
Estonia	12
United States	21
25 August
Spain	16
Belgium	14
25 August
China	13
Netherlands	21

Semi-finals
26 August
Hungary	14
United States	21
26 August
Spain	7
Netherlands	11

Final
26 August
United States	19
Netherlands	10
Third place
26 August
Hungary	11
Spain	12

=== Round of 16 ===
25 August 2014
17:00

Germany	9–5	Thailand
Pts: Rodefeld 4		Pts: Thuamon 2

Wutaishan Sports Center, Nanjing

25 August 2014
17:00

Egypt	18–20	Hungary

Wutaishan Sports Center, Nanjing

25 August 2014
17:40

Chinese Taipei	10–14	Estonia

Wutaishan Sports Center, Nanjing

25 August 2014
17:40

Venezuela	7–21	United States

Wutaishan Sports Center, Nanjing

25 August 2014
18:20

Romania	14–18	Spain
Pts: Ana Ferariu 7		Pts: Lucia Carpintero Togores 7

Wutaishan Sports Center, Nanjing
Referees: Ilona Kucerova / Jing Shi

25 August 2014
18:20

Report

Brazil	16–20	Belgium

Wutaishan Sports Center, Nanjing

25 August 2014
19:00

China	15–12	Czech Republic

Wutaishan Sports Center, Nanjing

25 August 2014
19:00

Report

Guam	1–17	Netherlands

Wutaishan Sports Center, Nanjing

=== Quarterfinals ===
25 August 2014
20:00

Germany	13–20	Hungary
Pts: Brossmann 8		Pts: Nagy 7

Wutaishan Sports Center, Nanjing

25 August 2014
20:00

Estonia	12–21	United States

Wutaishan Sports Center, Nanjing

25 August 2014
20:30

Spain	16–14	Belgium

Wutaishan Sports Center, Nanjing

25 August 2014
20:30

China	13–21	Netherlands

Wutaishan Sports Center, Nanjing

=== Semifinals ===
26 August 2014
17:30

Hungary	14–21	United States

Wutaishan Sports Center, Nanjing

26 August 2014
18:00

Spain	7–11	Netherlands

Wutaishan Sports Center, Nanjing

=== Bronze-medal game ===
26 August 2014
19:30

Hungary	11–12	Spain

Wutaishan Sports Center, Nanjing

=== Final ===
26 August 2014
20:30

United States	19–10	Netherlands

Wutaishan Sports Center, Nanjing

== Final standings ==
Rank	Team
Gold medal	United States
Silver medal	Netherlands
Bronze medal	Spain
4	Hungary
5	Belgium
6	Estonia
7	China
8	Germany
9	Thailand
10	Czech Republic
11	Chinese Taipei
12	Romania
13	Egypt
14	Brazil
15	Venezuela
16	Guam
17	Slovenia
18	Andorra
19	Syria
20	Indonesia
