= Ferariu =

Ferariu is a surname. Notable people with the surname include:

- Ana Ferariu (born 1997), Romanian basketball player
- Constantin Ferariu (born 1986), Romanian footballer
- Gheorghe Ferariu (born 1936), Romanian volleyball player
