= 3x3 Basketball at the 2014 Summer Youth Olympics – Boys' tournament =

Basketball at the 2014 Summer Youth Olympics took place at the Wutaishan Sports Center in Nanjing, China.

== Participating teams ==
Group A

- China
- France
- Germany
- Hungary
- Indonesia
- Lithuania
- Poland
- Puerto Rico
- Slovenia
- Uruguay

Group B

- Andorra
- Argentina
- Brazil
- Guatemala
- New Zealand
- Romania
- Russia
- Spain
- Tunisia
- Venezuela

== Preliminary round ==
=== Group A ===
Pos	Team	Pld	W	L	PF	PA	PD	Pts	Qualification
1	Lithuania	9	9	0	165	129	+36	18	Round of 16
2	Slovenia	9	7	2	152	120	+32	16	Round of 16
3	China	9	6	3	164	143	+21	15 (Note: CHN +1, PUR −1)	Round of 16
4	Puerto Rico	9	6	3	152	136	+16	15	Round of 16
5	Poland	9	5	4	153	127	+26	14	Round of 16
6	France	9	4	5	151	127	+24	13	Round of 16
7	Hungary	9	3	6	158	165	−7	12	Round of 16
8	Uruguay	9	2	7	103	154	−51	11 (Note: URU +1, GER −1)	Round of 16
9	Germany	9	2	7	118	149	−31	11	Eliminated
10	Indonesia	9	1	8	86	152	−66	10	Eliminated

Notes:

18 August

Hungary	19–21	Slovenia

18 August

Germany	18–15	China

18 August

Uruguay	11–10	Indonesia

18 August

Lithuania	17–14	Puerto Rico

18 August

Poland	14–12	France

18 August

China	21–11	Uruguay

18 August

Puerto Rico	22–20	Poland

18 August

Indonesia	13–14	Lithuania

18 August

Slovenia	15–11	France

18 August

Hungary	13–18	Germany

19 August

Poland	17–3	Indonesia

19 August

Uruguay	12–21	Hungary

19 August

Lithuania	18–14	China

19 August

Germany	9–21	Slovenia

19 August

France	15–8	Puerto Rico

20 August

China	18–15	Poland

20 August

Indonesia	7–21	France

20 August

Slovenia	12–16	Puerto Rico

20 August

Hungary	13–19	Lithuania

20 August

Germany	14–15	Uruguay

20 August

France	18–19	China

20 August

Uruguay	11–13	Slovenia

20 August

Poland	21–18	Hungary

20 August

Lithuania	21–15	Germany

20 August

Puerto Rico	15–13	Indonesia

22 August

Hungary	21–20	France

22 August

China	19–18	Puerto Rico

22 August

Slovenia	21–6	Indonesia

22 August

Germany	12–15	Poland

22 August

Uruguay	12–15	Lithuania

23 August

Indonesia	10–22	China

23 August

Poland	22–5	Uruguay

23 August

France	20–11	Germany

23 August

Puerto Rico	19–15	Hungary

23 August

Lithuania	21–14	Slovenia

23 August

Uruguay	13–17	France

23 August

Slovenia	19–15	China

23 August

Hungary	22–14	Indonesia

23 August

Germany	12–19	Puerto Rico

23 August

Lithuania	21–17	Poland

24 August

Puerto Rico	21–13	Uruguay

24 August

France	17–19	Lithuania

24 August

Poland	12–16	Slovenia

24 August

Indonesia	10–9	Germany

24 August

China	21–16	Hungary

=== Group B ===
Pos	Team	Pld	W	L	PF	PA	PD	Pts	Qualification
1	Argentina	9	7	2	156	101	+55	16	Round of 16
2	Russia	9	7	2	153	117	+36	16	Round of 16
3	Spain	9	7	2	145	135	+10	16	Round of 16
4	New Zealand	9	6	3	145	129	+16	15	Round of 16
5	Venezuela	9	5	4	136	128	+8	14	Round of 16
6	Brazil	9	4	5	116	92	+24	13 (Note: BRA +5, ROU −5)	Round of 16
7	Romania	9	4	5	130	122	+8	13	Round of 16
8	Tunisia	9	3	6	115	130	−15	12	Round of 16
9	Andorra	9	2	7	129	168	−39	11	Eliminated
10	Guatemala	9	0	9	74	177	−103	9	Eliminated

Notes:

18 August

Andorra	13–21	Russia

18 August

Spain	16–11	Tunisia

18 August

Brazil	10–16	Argentina

18 August

Romania	15–13	Venezuela

18 August

New Zealand	18–13	Guatemala

18 August

Tunisia	14–13	Brazil

18 August

Venezuela	15–16	New Zealand

18 August

Argentina	16–12	Romania

18 August

Russia	20–8	Guatemala

18 August

Andorra	18–21	Spain

19 August

New Zealand	9–14	Argentina

19 August

Brazil	21–2	Andorra

19 August

Romania	10–12	Tunisia

19 August

Spain	16–15	Russia

19 August

Guatemala	12–17	Venezuela

20 August

Tunisia	15–17	New Zealand

20 August

Argentina	21–5	Guatemala

20 August

Russia	14–15	Venezuela

20 August

Andorra	10–17	Romania

20 August

Spain	12–11	Brazil

20 August

Guatemala	2–19	Tunisia

20 August

Brazil	8–14	Russia

20 August

New Zealand	21–16	Andorra

20 August

Romania	16–13	Spain

20 August

Venezuela	15–21	Argentina

22 August

Andorra	21–10	Guatemala

22 August

Tunisia	5–13	Venezuela

22 August

Russia	13–11	Argentina

22 August

Spain	14–21	New Zealand

22 August

Brazil	12–7	Romania

23 August

Argentina	21–9	Tunisia

23 August

New Zealand	8–9	Brazil

22 August

Guatemala	14–21	Spain

23 August

Venezuela	19–17	Andorra

22 August

Romania	17–21	Russia

23 August

Brazil	19–4	Guatemala

23 August

Spain	15–14	Venezuela

23 August

Russia	17–13	Tunisia

23 August

Andorra	11–21	Argentina

23 August

Romania	15–19	New Zealand

24 August

Venezuela	15–13	Brazil

24 August

Guatemala	6–21	Romania

24 August

New Zealand	16–18	Russia

24 August

Argentina	15–17	Spain

24 August

Tunisia	17–21	Andorra

== Knockout round ==
Round of 16
25 August
France	18
Spain	10
25 August
Romania	20
Slovenia	14
25 August
Venezuela	20
Puerto Rico	18
25 August
Uruguay	13
Argentina	20
25 August
Brazil	12
China	11
25 August
Hungary	12
Russia	17
25 August
Poland	16
New Zealand	14
25 August
Tunisia	11
Lithuania	22

Quarter-finals
25 August
France	19
Romania	11
25 August
Venezuela	13
Argentina	21
25 August
Brazil	8
Russia	12
25 August
Poland	12
Lithuania	16

Semi-finals
26 August
France	16
Argentina	14
26 August
Russia	10
Lithuania	13

Final
26 August
France	16
Lithuania	18
Third place
26 August
Argentina	17
Russia	14

=== Round of 16 ===
25 August

France	18–10	Spain

25 August

Romania	20–14	Slovenia

25 August

Venezuela	20–18	Puerto Rico

25 August

Uruguay	13–20	Argentina

25 August

Brazil	12–11	China

25 August

Hungary	12–17	Russia

25 August

Poland	16–14	New Zealand

25 August

Tunisia	11–22	Lithuania

=== Quarterfinals ===
25 August

France	19–11	Romania

25 August

Venezuela	13–21	Argentina

25 August

Brazil	8–12	Russia

25 August

Poland	12–16	Lithuania

=== Semifinals ===
26 August

France	16–14	Argentina

26 August

Russia	10–13	Lithuania

=== Bronze-medal game ===
26 August

Argentina	17–14	Russia

=== Final ===
26 August

France	16–18	Lithuania

== Final standings ==
Rank	Team
Gold medal	Lithuania
Silver medal	France
Bronze medal	Argentina
4	Russia
5	Poland
6	Venezuela
7	Brazil
8	Romania
9	Slovenia
10	Spain
11	New Zealand
12	China
13	Puerto Rico
14	Hungary
15	Tunisia
16	Uruguay
17	Andorra
18	Germany
19	Indonesia
20	Guatemala
