= Romania at the 2014 Summer Youth Olympics =

- IOC code: ROU
- NOC: Romanian Olympic and Sports Committee
- Website: www.cosr.ro

in Nanjing
- Competitors: 41 in 13 sports
- Flag bearer: Adina Diaconu
- Medals Ranked 28th: Gold 2 Silver 3 Bronze 0 Total 5

Summer Youth Olympics appearances
- 2010; 2014; 2018

Romania competed at the 2014 Summer Youth Olympics, in Nanjing, China from 16 August to 28 August 2014.

== Medalists ==
Medal	Name	Sport	Event	Date
Gold	Ioana Teodora Gheorghe	Athletics	Mixed Events	20 August
Gold	Gheorghe Robert Dedu; Ciprian Tudosa	Rowing	Boys' Pairs	20 August
Gold	Cristina Georgiana Popescu; Denisa Tilvescu	Rowing	Girls' Pairs	20 August
Silver	Stefania Adelina Dobre	Judo	Girls' -63 kg	18 August
Silver	Andrei Rares Toader	Athletics	Boys' Shot Put	24 August
Silver	Alexandru Mihaita Novac	Athletics	Boys' Javelin Throw	25 August

== Athletics ==
Romania qualified ten athletes.

Qualification Legend: Q=Final A (medal); qB=Final B (non-medal); qC=Final C (non-medal); qD=Final D (non-medal); qE=Final E (non-medal)

Boys
Track & road events

Athlete	Event	Heats		Final	
Athlete	Event	Result	Rank	Result	Rank
Madalin Dorian Gheban	800 m	1:51.45	9 Q	1:52.56	9
Ionut Adrian Postoaca	10 km walk	—		48:29.10	10

Field Events

Athlete	Event	Qualification		Final	
Athlete	Event	Distance	Rank	Distance	Rank
Gabriel Bitan	Long jump	7.22	3 Q	7.32	5
Andrei Rares Toader	Shot put	20.63	2 Q	21.00	2nd place, silver medalist(s)
Alexandru Mihaita Novac	Javelin throw	77.61	1 Q	73.98	2nd place, silver medalist(s)

Girls
Track & road events

Athlete	Event	Heats		Final	
Athlete	Event	Result	Rank	Result	Rank
Ioana Gheorghe	200 m	24:80	11 Q	24:81	10
Gabriela Doroftei	1500 m	4:35.82	13 Q	4:40.63	16
Maria Magdalena Ifteni	3000 m	9:15.00	9 Q	9:29.53	9
Nicoleta Lungu	5 km walk	—		25:49.03	13

Field events

Athlete	Event	Qualification		Final	
Athlete	Event	Distance	Rank	Distance	Rank
Carla Sescu	Discus throw	47.40	3 Q	44.60	8

Mixed events

Athletes	Event	Heats		Final	
Athletes	Event	Result	Rank	Result	Rank
Team 034; Merten Howe; Germany; Daou Bacar Aboubacar; Comoros; Trae Williams; Australia; Witthawat Thumvha; Thailand; Maria Simancas; Venezuela; Tatiana Blagoveshchenskaia; Russia; Lakeisha Ashley Warner; British Virgin Islands; Ioana Teodora Gheorghe; Romania	8×100 m relay mixed teams	1:41.79	2 Q	1:40.20	1st place, gold medalist(s)

== Basketball ==
Romania qualified a boys' and girls' team from their performance at the 2013 3x3 World Tour Final.

Skills Competition

Athlete	Event	Qualification				Final			
Athlete	Event	Round 1	Round 2	Total	Rank	Round 1	Round 2	Total	Rank
Bogdan Nicolescu	Boys' Dunk Contest	24	25	49	7	Did not advance			
Levente Nandor Kuti	Boys' Dunk Contest	0	27	27	13	Did not advance			

Athlete	Event	Qualification			Final		
Athlete	Event	Points	Time	Rank	Points	Time	Rank
Ana Ferariu	Girls' Shoot-out Contest	6	25.4	6	Did not advance		
Timea Beatrice Peter	Girls' Shoot-out Contest	4	25.0	24	Did not advance		
Kincso Kelemen	Girls' Shoot-out Contest	3	26.10	39	Did not advance		
Iringo Debreczi	Girls' Shoot-out Contest	3	29.8	47	Did not advance		

=== Boys' tournament ===
Roster

- Dragos Gheorghe
- Tudor Gheorghe
- Nandor Kuti
- Nicolae Nicolescu

Group Stage

Pos	Team	Pld	W	L	PF	PA	PD	Pts	Qualification
1	Argentina	9	7	2	156	101	+55	16	Round of 16
2	Russia	9	7	2	153	117	+36	16	Round of 16
3	Spain	9	7	2	145	135	+10	16	Round of 16
4	New Zealand	9	6	3	145	129	+16	15	Round of 16
5	Venezuela	9	5	4	136	128	+8	14	Round of 16
6	Brazil	9	4	5	116	92	+24	13 (Note: BRA +5, ROU −5)	Round of 16
7	Romania	9	4	5	130	122	+8	13	Round of 16
8	Tunisia	9	3	6	115	130	−15	12	Round of 16
9	Andorra	9	2	7	129	168	−39	11	Eliminated
10	Guatemala	9	0	9	74	177	−103	9	Eliminated

Notes:

18 August 2014
18:00

Romania	15–13	Venezuela
Pts: Jase Materan 8		Pts: Daniel Dragos Gheorghe 9

Wutaishan Sports Center, Nanjing
Referees: Edmond Ho / Ikuko Kozakai

18 August 2014
21:00

Argentina	16–12	Romania
Pts: Jose Vildoza 8		Pts: Tudor Gheorghe 6

Wutaishan Sports Center, Nanjing
Referees: Edmond Ho / Xiaoguang Yang

19 August 2014
19:20

Romania	10–12	Tunisia
Pts: Levente Nandor Kuti 10		Pts: Mahmoud Hajri, Ahmed Dhif 5

Wutaishan Sports Center, Nanjing
Referees: Xiaoguang Yang / Jing Shi

20 August 2014
18:00

Andorra	10–17	Romania
Pts: Sergi Faus Jordana 5		Pts: Levente Nandor Kuti, Bogdan Nicolescu 7

Wutaishan Sports Center, Nanjing
Referees: Lei Zheng / Ningpeng Yuan

20 August 2014
21:20

Romania	16–13	Spain
Pts: Levente Nandor Kuti 8		Pts: Adnan Alic Omeragic 6

Wutaishan Sports Center, Nanjing
Referees: Ilona Kucerova / Jasmina Juras

22 August 2014
20:00

Brazil	12–7	Romania
Pts: Eduardo Igor Cabral Pereira 5		Pts: Levente Nandor Kuti, Bogdan Nicolescu, Daniel Dragos Gheorghe 2

Wutaishan Sports Center, Nanjing
Referees: Lei Zheng / Xiaoguang Yang

23 August 2014
18:20

Romania	17–21	Russia
Pts: Tudor Gheorghe, Bogdan Nicolescu 5		Pts: Vladimir Ivanov 9

Wutaishan Sports Center, Nanjing
Referees: Ikuko Kozakai / Ningpeng Yuan

23 August 2014
21:40

Romania	15–19	New Zealand
Pts: Tudor Gheorghe 7		Pts: Eugene Alan Raymond Penny 11

Wutaishan Sports Center, Nanjing
Referees: Jing Shi / Xiaoguang Yang

24 August 2014
19:00

Guatemala	6–21	Romania
Pts: Jose Luis Tuchan 3		Pts: Levente Nandor Kuti 10

Wutaishan Sports Center, Nanjing
Referees: Jing Shi / Ningpeng Yuan

Round of 16

25 August 2014
19:00

Romania	20–14	Slovenia
Pts: Levente Nandor Kuti 12		Pts: Milan Kovacevic 6

Wutaishan Sports Center, Nanjing
Referees: Jing Shi / Lei Zheng

Quarterfinals

25 August 2014
21:00

France	19–11	Romania
Pts: Lucas Dussoulier 7		Pts: Levente Nandor Kuti 5

Wutaishan Sports Center, Nanjing
Referees: Edmond Ho / Xiaoguang Yang

Knockout Stage

Round of 16	Quarterfinals	Semifinals	Final	Rank
Opposition Score	Opposition Score	Opposition Score	Opposition Score	Rank
Slovenia; W 20-14	France; L 11–19	did not advance		8

=== Girls' tournament ===
Roster

- Iringo Debreczi
- Ana Ferariu
- Kincso Kelemen
- Beatrice Peter

Group Stage

Pos	Team	Pld	W	D	L	PF	PA	PD	Pts	Qualification
1	United States	9	9	0	0	190	54	+136	27	Round of 16
2	Belgium	9	7	0	2	136	75	+61	21	Round of 16
3	Thailand	9	6	0	3	96	102	−6	18	Round of 16
4	Czech Republic	9	6	0	3	140	106	+34	18	Round of 16
5	Chinese Taipei	9	5	0	4	124	114	+10	15	Round of 16
6	Romania	9	5	0	4	118	102	+16	15	Round of 16
7	Egypt	9	4	0	5	125	127	−2	12	Round of 16
8	Guam	9	2	0	7	77	151	−74	6	Round of 16
9	Andorra	9	1	0	8	76	161	−85	3	Eliminated
10	Indonesia	9	0	0	9	66	156	−90	0	Eliminated

18 August 2014
20:00

United States	21–3	Romania
Pts: Napheesa Collier 11		Pts: Ana Ferariu 2

Wutaishan Sports Center, Nanjing
Referees: Ningpeng Yuan / Xiaoguang Yang

19 August 2014
18:00

Guam	3–16	Romania
Pts: Destiny Castro 2		Pts: Ana Ferariu 8

Wutaishan Sports Center, Nanjing
Referees: Lei Zheng / Jing Shi

19 August 2014
21:40

Romania	20–8	Indonesia
Pts: Iringo Debraczi 9		Pts: Regita Pramesti 5

Wutaishan Sports Center, Nanjing
Referees: Jing Shi / Xiaoguang Yang

20 August 2014
19:00

Egypt	11–13	Romania
Pts: Raneem Elgedawy 6		Pts: Ana Ferariu 6

Wutaishan Sports Center, Nanjing
Referees: Ningpeng Yuan / Jing Shi

22 August 2014
17:00

Romania	16–4	Thailand
Pts: Kincso Kelemen 5		Pts: Amphawa Thuamon, Rujiwan Bunsinprom 2

Wutaishan Sports Center, Nanjing
Referees: Jing Shi/ Ningpeng Yuan

22 August 2014
20:20

Belgium	12–10	Romania
Pts: Aline Kristine Jos Verelst 5		Pts: Kincso Kelemen 6

Wutaishan Sports Center, Nanjing
Referees: Lei Zheng / Xiaoguang Yang

23 August 2014
19:20

Romania	18–8	Andorra
Pts: Beatrice Timea Peter 6		Pts: Anna Mana Buscall 3

Wutaishan Sports Center, Nanjing
Referees: Ikuko Kozakai / Xiaoguang Yang

24 August 2014
17:00

Chinese Taipei	16–13	Romania
Pts: Pin Lo 11		Pts: Ana Ferariu 7

Wutaishan Sports Center, Nanjing
Referees: Jing Shi / Ningpeng Yuan

24 August 2014
20:40

Romania	9–19	Czech Republic
Pts: Ana Ferariu 5		Pts: Gabriela Andelova 6

Wutaishan Sports Center, Nanjing
Referees: Ilona Kucerova / Lei Zheng

Round of 16

25 August 2014
19:00

Romania	14–18	Spain
Pts: Ana Ferariu 7		Pts: Lucia Carpintero Togores 7

Wutaishan Sports Center, Nanjing
Referees: Ilona Kucerova / Jing Shi

Knockout Stage

Round of 16	Quarterfinals	Semifinals	Final	Rank
Opposition Score	Opposition Score	Opposition Score	Opposition Score	Rank
Spain; L 14-18	did not advance			

== Boxing ==
Romania qualified one boxer based on its performance at the 2014 AIBA Youth World Championships

Boys

Athlete	Event	Preliminaries	Semifinals	Final / RM	Rank
Athlete	Event	Opposition Result	Opposition Result	Opposition Result	Rank
Arsen Mustafa	-60 kg	Zhussupov (KAZ); L 0-3	Did not advance	Bout for fifth Place Segura (MEX); L w/o	6

== Canoeing ==
Romania qualified two boats based on its performance at the 2013 World Junior Canoe Sprint and Slalom Championships.

Boys

Athlete	Event	Qualification		Round of 16		Quarterfinals	Semifinals	Final / BM	Rank
Athlete	Event	Time	Rank	Time	Rank	Opposition Result	Opposition Result	Opposition Result	Rank
George Vasile	C1 slalom	1:37.826	8 Q	n/a		Mirgorodsky M. (SVK); 1:38.219	Did not advance		6
George Vasile	C1 sprint	1:49.541	6 Q	1:52.515	8 Q	Guliev A.(UZB); 1:47.447	Did not advance		5

Girls

Athlete	Event	Qualification		Repechage		Round of 16		Quarterfinals	Semifinals	Final / BM	Rank
Athlete	Event	Time	Rank	Time	Rank	Time	Rank	Opposition Result	Opposition Result	Opposition Result	Rank
Adriana Duta	K1 slalom	1:38.758	16	1:34.679	6 Q	1:42.686	16	Did not advance			16
Adriana Duta	K1 sprint	1:51.114	5 Q	n/a		1:52.666	5 Q	Nikitina I. (RUS); 1:49.418	Did not advance		5

== Fencing ==
Romania qualified one athlete based on its performance at the 2014 FIE Cadet World Championships.

Boys

Athlete	Event	Pool Round	Seed	Round of 16	Quarterfinals	Semifinals	Final / BM	Rank
Athlete	Event	Opposition Score	Seed	Opposition Score	Opposition Score	Opposition Score	Opposition Score	Rank
Tudor Cucu	Sabre	Y Yan (CHN) Al-Musawi (IRQ); W 5-0; K Dongju (KOR) M Ayman (EGY) I Ilin (RUS) B Alshamlan (KUW); W 5-2	3	Ayman M (EGY); L 14-15	Did not advance			9

Mixed Team

Athletes	Event	Round of 16	Quarterfinals	Semifinals / PM	Final / PM	Rank
Athletes	Event	Opposition Score	Opposition Score	Opposition Score	Opposition Score	Rank
Europe 4 Samuel Unterhauser; Germany; Claudia Borella; Italy; Tudor Cucu; Romania; Inna Brovko; Ukraine; Petar Files; Croatia; Teodora Gkountoura; Germany	Mixed teams	n/a	Asia-Oceania 1 L 22-30	Americas 1 W 30-27	Americas 2 L 28-30	6

== Gymnastics ==
=== Artistic Gymnastics ===
Romania qualified one athlete based on its performance at the 2014 European WAG Championships.

Girls

Athlete	Event	Apparatus				Total	Rank
Athlete	Event	V	UB	BB	F	Total	Rank
Laura Jurcă	Qualification	12.700 Q	14.400 Q	12.800 Q	13.350 Q	53.250 Q	3
Laura Jurcă	All-around Final	12.200	14.600	12.300	13.000	52.100	7
Laura Jurcă	Vault Final	14.249	—			14.249	4
Laura Jurcă	Uneven Bars Final	—	11.133	—		11.133	7
Laura Jurcă	Beam Final	—		11.866	—	11.866	8
Laura Jurcă	Floor Final	—			13.366	13.366	4

=== Rhythmic Gymnastics ===
Romania qualified one athlete based on its performance at the 2014 Rhythmic Gymnastics Grand Prix in Moscow.

Individual

Athlete	Event	Qualification						Final					
Athlete	Event	Hoop	Ball	Clubs	Ribbon	Total	Rank	Hoop	Ball	Clubs	Ribbon	Total	Rank
Ana Filiorianu	Individual	14.125	13.850	14.000	13.350	55.325	5	13.500	14.350	13.600	14.400	55.850	4

== Judo ==
Romania qualified one athlete based on its performance at the 2013 Cadet World Judo Championships.

Individual

Athlete	Event	Round of 32	Round of 16	Quarterfinals	Semifinals	Rep 1	Rep 2	Rep 3	Rep 4	Final / BM	Rank
Athlete	Event	Opposition Result	Opposition Result	Opposition Result	Opposition Result	Opposition Result	Opposition Result	Opposition Result	Opposition Result	Opposition Result	Rank
Ştefania Adelina Dobre	Girls' -63 kg	BYE	Piovesana (GBR); W 000S1–000S2	Drozdova (UKR); W 100–000S1	Klimkait (CAN); W 100S1–010S1	BYE				Gercsak (HUN); L 000S3–102	2nd place, silver medalist(s)

Team

Athletes	Event	Round of 16	Quarterfinals	Semifinals	Final	Rank
Athletes	Event	Opposition Result	Opposition Result	Opposition Result	Opposition Result	Rank
Team Chochishvili; Stefania Adelina Dobre (ROU); Fatim Fofana (CIV); Bogdan Iadov (UKR); Louis Krieber-Gagnon (CAN); Liu Xiaoyu (CHN); Yu-Hsuan Lo (TPE); Marton Sarecz (HUN); Estefania Soriano (DOM)	Mixed Team	Team Geesink (MIX); L 3–4	did not advance			9

== Rowing ==
Romania qualified two boats based on its performance at the 2013 World Rowing Junior Championships.

Athlete	Event	Heats		Repechage		Final	
Athlete	Event	Time	Rank	Time	Rank	Time	Rank
Gheorghe Robert Dedu; Ciprian Tudosă	Boys' Pairs	3:10.26	1 Q FA	n/a		3:11.27	1st place, gold medalist(s)
Cristina Georgiana Popescu; Denisa Tîlvescu	Girls' Pairs	3:29.21	1 Q FA	n/a		3:37.32	1st place, gold medalist(s)

Qualification Legend: FA=Final A (medal); FB=Final B (non-medal); FC=Final C (non-medal); FD=Final D (non-medal); SA/B=Semifinals A/B; SC/D=Semifinals C/D; R=Repechage

== Swimming ==
Romania qualified four swimmers.

Boys

Athlete	Event	Heat		Semifinal		Final	
Athlete	Event	Time	Rank	Time	Rank	Time	Rank
Robert Andrei Glinţă	50 m freestyle	23.56	16 Q	23.26	13	Did not advance	
Robert Andrei Glinţă	100 m freestyle	50.98	14 Q	50.66	11	Did not advance	
Robert Andrei Glinţă	50 m backstroke	25.63	1 Q	25.98	8 Q	25.96	7
Robert Andrei Glinţă	100 m backstroke	55.46	2 Q	55.10	5 Q	55.21	5
Robert Andrei Glinţă	200 m backstroke	2:03.11	10	Did not advance			
Andrei Roman	50 m breaststroke	29.25	21	Did not advance			
Andrei Roman	100 m breaststroke	1:03.61	14 Q	1:03.63	15	Did not advance	
Andrei Roman	200 m breaststroke	2:18.72	18	Did not advance			

Girls

Athlete	Event	Heat		Semifinal		Final	
Athlete	Event	Time	Rank	Time	Rank	Time	Rank
Alina Ene	400 m freestyle	4:34.89	30	Did not advance			
Alina Ene	800 m freestyle	—				9:27.01	26
Alina Ene	200 m individual medley	2:25.75	24	Did not advance			
Florina Ilie	50 m breaststroke	33.39	23	Did not advance			
Florina Ilie	100 m breaststroke	1:12.26	19	Did not advance			
Florina Ilie	200 m breaststroke	2:42.17	22	Did not advance			

== Table Tennis ==
Romania qualified one athlete based on its performance at the 2014 World Qualification Event.

Singles

Athlete	Event	Group Stage	Rank	Round of 16	Quarterfinals	Semifinals	Final / BM	Rank
Athlete	Event	Opposition Score	Rank	Opposition Score	Opposition Score	Opposition Score	Opposition Score	Rank
Adina Diaconu	Girls	Group G Lorenzotti (URU); W 3–1	1	Mischek (AUT); W 4-0	Doo (HKG); L 1-4	did not advance		5
Adina Diaconu	Girls	Wan (GER); W 3–0	1	Mischek (AUT); W 4-0	Doo (HKG); L 1-4	did not advance		5
Adina Diaconu	Girls	Ryabova (KAZ); W 3-1	1	Mischek (AUT); W 4-0	Doo (HKG); L 1-4	did not advance		5

Team

Athletes	Event	Group Stage	Rank	Round of 16	Quarterfinals	Semifinals	Final / BM	Rank
Athletes	Event	Opposition Score	Rank	Opposition Score	Opposition Score	Opposition Score	Opposition Score	Rank
Europe 1 Adina Diaconu (ROU); Diogo Chen (POR)	Mixed	Yee / Yin (SIN); W 3-0	1	Racovac / Pucar (CRO); L 0-2	did not advance			9
Europe 1 Adina Diaconu (ROU); Diogo Chen (POR)	Mixed	Štefcová / Reitspies (CZE); W 2-1	1	Racovac / Pucar (CRO); L 0-2	did not advance			9
Europe 1 Adina Diaconu (ROU); Diogo Chen (POR)	Mixed	Bui / Huang (AUS); W 3-0	1	Racovac / Pucar (CRO); L 0-2	did not advance			9

Qualification Legend: Q=Main Bracket (medal); qB=Consolation Bracket (non-medal)

== Taekwondo ==
Romania qualified one athlete based on its performance at the Taekwondo Qualification Tournament.

Boys

Athlete	Event	Round of 16	Quarterfinals	Semifinals	Final	Rank
Athlete	Event	Opposition Result	Opposition Result	Opposition Result	Opposition Result	Rank
József Zsolt Fehér	+73 kg	BYE	Liu (CHN); L 4-11	did not advance		5

== Tennis ==
Romania qualified two athletes based on the 9 June 2014 ITF World Junior Rankings.

Singles

Athlete	Event	Round of 32	Round of 16	Quarterfinals	Semifinals	Final / BM	Rank
Athlete	Event	Opposition Score	Opposition Score	Opposition Score	Opposition Score	Opposition Score	Rank
Ioana Ducu	Girls' Singles	F Stollár (HUN); L 7–6, 6-2	Did not advance				
Ioana Loredana Roșca	Girls' Singles	D Kasatkina (RUS); L 6–3, 6-0	Did not advance				

Doubles

Athletes	Event	Round of 32	Round of 16	Quarterfinals	Semifinals	Final / BM	Rank
Athletes	Event	Opposition Score	Opposition Score	Opposition Score	Opposition Score	Opposition Score	Rank
Ioana Ducu (ROU); Ioana Loredana Roșca (ROU)	Girls' Doubles	—	S Kenin (USA); R Zarazúa (MEX); L 6–1, 5–7, 8-10	Did not advance			
Ioana Ducu (ROU); Matias Zukas (ARG)	Mixed Doubles	LS Jacobs (NAM); GO Iradukunda (BDI)} W 6–3, 6-1	IL Roșca (ROU); F Bahamonde (ARG); W w/o	A Komardina (RUS); K Khachanov (RUS); W 7–6, 6-4	J Teichmann (SUI); J Zieliński (POL); L 2–6, 1-6	Fanni Stollár (HUN); Kamil Majchrzak (POL); L 3–6, 6–3, 5-10	4
Ioana Loredana Roșca (ROU); Francisco Bahamonde (ARG)	Mixed Doubles	A Bondár (HUN); A Biró (HUN); W 7–6, 6-3	I Ducu (ROU); M Zukas (ARG); L w/o	Did not advance			

== Weightlifting ==
Romania qualified 2 quotas in the boys' events and 2 quota in the girls' events based on the team ranking after the 2013 Weightlifting Youth World Championships.

Boys

Athlete	Event	Snatch		Clean & jerk		Total	Rank
Athlete	Event	Result	Rank	Result	Rank	Total	Rank
Robert Ştefan Manea	−56 kg	107	5	131	4	238	4
Marius Petrache	−69 kg	122	5	145	7	267	6

Girls

Athlete	Event	Snatch		Clean & jerk		Total	Rank
Athlete	Event	Result	Rank	Result	Rank	Total	Rank
Viorica Grigoraş	−53 kg	70	6	83	6	153	6
Florina Hulpan	-63 kg	85	5	105	5	190	5
