= Estonia at the 2014 Summer Youth Olympics =

- IOC code: EST
- NOC: Estonian Olympic Committee
- Website: www.eok.ee

in Nanjing
- Competitors: 17 (7 boys, 10 girls) in 7 sports
- Flag bearer: Hans-Christian Hausenberg
- Medals: Gold 0 Silver 0 Bronze 0 Total 0

Summer Youth Olympics appearances (overview)
- 2010; 2014; 2018; 2026

Estonia competed at the 2014 Summer Youth Olympics, in Nanjing, China from 16 August to 28 August 2014.

== Athletics ==
Estonia qualified five athletes.

Qualification Legend: Q=Final A (medal); qB=Final B (non-medal); qC=Final C (non-medal); qD=Final D (non-medal); qE=Final E (non-medal)

Boys
Field Events

Athlete	Event	Qualification		Final	
Athlete	Event	Distance	Rank	Distance	Rank
Hans-Christian Hausenberg	Long jump	7.33	2 Q	NM	
Sander Moldau	Pole vault	4.70	11 qB	4.50	12
Kert Piirimäe	Shot put	19.36	5 Q	19.55	5
Georg Kaspar Räni	Hammer throw	67.96	11 qB	67.17	12

Girls
Field events

Athlete	Event	Qualification		Final	
Athlete	Event	Distance	Position	Distance	Position
Valeria Radajeva	Shot put	13.31	15 qB	13.68	14

== Badminton ==
Estonia qualified one athlete based on the 2 May 2014 BWF Junior World Rankings.

Singles

Athlete	Event	Group stage				Quarterfinal	Semifinal	Final / BM	Rank
Athlete	Event	Opposition Score	Opposition Score	Opposition Score	Rank	Opposition Score	Opposition Score	Opposition Score	Rank
Kristin Kuuba	Girls' Singles	Mariya Mitsova (BUL); L 21–11 21–15	Luise Heim (GER); L 21–11 21–12	Ng Tsz Yau (HKG); L 21–17 21–10	4	did not advance			9

Doubles

Athlete	Event	Group stage				Quarterfinal	Semifinal	Final / BM	Rank
Athlete	Event	Opposition Score	Opposition Score	Opposition Score	Rank	Opposition Score	Opposition Score	Opposition Score	Rank
Kristin Kuuba (EST); Luis Ramon Garrido (MEX)	Mixed Doubles	Liang (SIN)/ Petrovic (SRB); L 17–21 20–22	Demirbag (TUR)/ Pham (VIE); W 14–21 21–12 22–20	Lee (MAS)/ Lu (TPE); L 17–21 18–21	4	did not advance			9

== Basketball ==
Estonia qualified a girls' team from their performance at the 2013 U18 3x3 World Championships.

Skills Competition

Athlete	Event	Qualification			Final		
Athlete	Event	Points	Time	Rank	Points	Time	Rank
Kadri-Ann Lass	Girls' Shoot-out Contest	4	21.10	18	did not advance		
Marie Roosalu	Girls' Shoot-out Contest	3	29.60	46	did not advance		

=== Girls' tournament ===
Roster

- Kadri-Ann Lass
- Tatjana Razguljajeva
- Marie Roosalu
- Kadri Uiga

Group Stage

Pos	Team	Pld	W	D	L	PF	PA	PD	Pts	Qualification
1	Netherlands	9	8	0	1	164	87	+77	24	Round of 16
2	Hungary	9	8	0	1	146	91	+55	24	Round of 16
3	Spain	9	7	0	2	151	95	+56	21	Round of 16
4	Estonia	9	5	0	4	130	109	+21	15	Round of 16
5	China	9	5	0	4	128	103	+25	15	Round of 16
6	Germany	9	4	0	5	111	133	−22	12	Round of 16
7	Brazil	9	3	0	6	101	123	−22	9	Round of 16
8	Venezuela	9	2	0	7	101	153	−52	6	Round of 16
9	Slovenia	9	2	0	7	120	156	−36	6	Eliminated
10	Syria	9	1	0	8	68	170	−102	3	Eliminated

18 August 2014
19:40

Brazil	2–15	Estonia

Wutaishan Sports Center, Nanjing

19 August 2014
17:20

Estonia	12–21	Netherlands

Wutaishan Sports Center, Nanjing

19 August 2014
21:40

China	11–15	Estonia

Wutaishan Sports Center, Nanjing

20 August 2014
19:20

Slovenia	14–16	Estonia

Wutaishan Sports Center, Nanjing

22 August 2014
18:20

Estonia	16–7	Venezuela

Wutaishan Sports Center, Nanjing

22 August 2014
20:40

Syria	5–21	Estonia

Wutaishan Sports Center, Nanjing

23 August 2014
19:40

Estonia	10–12	Hungary

Wutaishan Sports Center, Nanjing

24 August 2014
17:40

Spain	20–11	Estonia

Wutaishan Sports Center, Nanjing

24 August 2014
20:20

Estonia	14–17	Germany

Wutaishan Sports Center, Nanjing

Round of 16

25 August 2014
17:40

Chinese Taipei	10–14	Estonia

Wutaishan Sports Center, Nanjing

Quarterfinals

25 August 2014
20:00

Estonia	12–21	United States

Wutaishan Sports Center, Nanjing

Knockout Stage

Round of 16	Quarterfinals	Semifinals	Final	Rank
Opposition Score	Opposition Score	Opposition Score	Opposition Score	Rank
Chinese Taipei 'W'14–10	United States 'L'12–21	Did not advance		6

== Cycling ==
Estonia qualified a girls' team based on its ranking issued by the UCI.

Team

Athletes	Event	Cross-Country Eliminator		Time Trial			BMX		Cross-Country Race			Road Race			Total Pts	Rank
Athletes	Event	Rank	Points	Time	Rank	Points	Rank	Points	Time	Rank	Points	Time	Rank	Points	Total Pts	Rank
Mari-Liis Mõttus; Kärolin Varblane	Girls' Team	3	65	6:04.41	6	30	16	2	46:57	5	40	1:12:36; DNS	15	2	139	7

== Judo ==
Estonia qualified one athlete based on its performance at the 2013 Cadet World Judo Championships.

Individual

Athlete	Event	Round of 32	Round of 16	Quarterfinals	Semifinals	Rep 1	Rep 2	Rep 3	Rep 4	Final / BM	Rank
Athlete	Event	Opposition Result	Opposition Result	Opposition Result	Opposition Result	Opposition Result	Opposition Result	Opposition Result	Opposition Result	Opposition Result	Rank
Mattias Kuusik	Boys' −81 kg	Bye	Arso Milic (MNE); L 0003–0102	did not advance		Salim Farukhi (TJK); L 1013–0002	did not advance				17

== Sailing ==
Estonia was given a reallocation boat based on being a top ranked nation not yet qualified.

Athlete	Event	Race											Net Points	Final Rank
Athlete	Event	1	2	3	4	5	6	7	8	9	10	M*	Net Points	Final Rank
Brigita Viilop	Girls' Techno 293	(20)	15	12	5	18	11	18	Cancelled			99.00	79.00	15

== Swimming ==
Estonia qualified three swimmers.

Boys

Athlete	Event	Heat		Semifinal		Final	
Athlete	Event	Time	Rank	Time	Rank	Time	Rank
Karl Luht	50 m backstroke	26.46	11 Q	26.49	14	did not advance	
Karl Luht	100 m backstroke	58.62	29	did not advance			
Daniel Zaitsev	50 m butterfly	24.61	5 Q	24.39	5 Q	24.57	7
Daniel Zaitsev	100 m butterfly	55.55	15 Q	55.39	15	did not advance	

Girls

Athlete	Event	Heat		Semifinal		Final	
Athlete	Event	Time	Rank	Time	Rank	Time	Rank
Karleen Kersa	50 m breaststroke	32.66	15 Q	32.82	14	did not advance	
Karleen Kersa	100 m breaststroke	1:13.04	20	did not advance			
