= Andorra at the 2014 Summer Youth Olympics =

- IOC code: AND
- NOC: Andorran Olympic Committee
- Website: www.coa.ad

in Nanjing
- Competitors: 10 in 3 sports
- Medals: Gold 0 Silver 0 Bronze 0 Total 0

Summer Youth Olympics appearances (overview)
- 2010; 2014; 2018

Andorra competed at the 2014 Summer Youth Olympics, in Nanjing, China from 16 August to 28 August 2014.

== Basketball ==
Andorra qualified a boys' and girls' based on the 1 June 2014 FIBA 3x3 National Federation Rankings.

Skills Competition

Athlete	Event	Qualification			Final		
Athlete	Event	Points	Time	Rank	Points	Time	Rank
Claudia Brunet	Girls' Shoot-out Contest	3	27.4	42	did not advance		
Anna Mana	Girls' Shoot-out Contest	5	28.2	15	did not advance		
Laura Navarro	Girls' Shoot-out Contest	2	24.4	51	did not advance		
Maria Vidal Segalas	Girls' Shoot-out Contest	3	21.5	31	did not advance		

=== Boys' tournament ===
Roster

- Coy de Bofarull
- Sergi Jimenez Marquez
- Sergi Jordana Faus
- Riera Lliteras

Group Stage

Pos	Team	Pld	W	L	PF	PA	PD	Pts	Qualification
1	Argentina	9	7	2	156	101	+55	16	Round of 16
2	Russia	9	7	2	153	117	+36	16	Round of 16
3	Spain	9	7	2	145	135	+10	16	Round of 16
4	New Zealand	9	6	3	145	129	+16	15	Round of 16
5	Venezuela	9	5	4	136	128	+8	14	Round of 16
6	Brazil	9	4	5	116	92	+24	13 (Note: BRA +5, ROU −5)	Round of 16
7	Romania	9	4	5	130	122	+8	13	Round of 16
8	Tunisia	9	3	6	115	130	−15	12	Round of 16
9	Andorra	9	2	7	129	168	−39	11	Eliminated
10	Guatemala	9	0	9	74	177	−103	9	Eliminated

Notes:

18 August 2014
17:00

Andorra	13–21	Russia
Pts: Lliteras 6		Pts: Gornaev 7

Wutaishan Sports Center, Nanjing

18 August 2014
21:40

Andorra	18–21	Spain
Pts: Lliteras 12		Pts: Omeragic 11

Wutaishan Sports Center, Nanjing

19 August 2014
19:00

Brazil	21–2	Andorra
Pts: Pereira 10		Pts: Lliteras, Jimenez 1

Wutaishan Sports Center, Nanjing

20 August 2014
18:00

Andorra	10–17	Romania
Pts: Jordana 5		Pts: Kuti, Niculescu 7

Wutaishan Sports Center, Nanjing

20 August 2014
21:00

New Zealand	21–16	Andorra
Pts: Timmins 9		Pts: Lliteras 12

Wutaishan Sports Center, Nanjing

22 August 2014
18:40

Andorra	21–10	Guatemala
Pts: Lliteras 17		Pts: Rosales 5

Wutaishan Sports Center, Nanjing

23 August 2014
18:00

Venezuela	19–17	Andorra
Pts: Garmendia 8		Pts: Lliteras 12

Wutaishan Sports Center, Nanjing

23 August 2014
21:20

Andorra	11–21	Argentina
Pts: Lliteras 5		Pts: Vildoza 11

Wutaishan Sports Center, Nanjing

24 August 2014
20:00

Tunisia	17–21	Andorra
Pts: Hajri 8		Pts: Lliteras 11

Wutaishan Sports Center, Nanjing

=== Girls' tournament ===
Roster

- Claudia Brunet Solano
- Anna Mana Buscall
- Laura Navarro Marin
- Maria Vidal Segalas

Group Stage

Pos	Team	Pld	W	D	L	PF	PA	PD	Pts	Qualification
1	United States	9	9	0	0	190	54	+136	27	Round of 16
2	Belgium	9	7	0	2	136	75	+61	21	Round of 16
3	Thailand	9	6	0	3	96	102	−6	18	Round of 16
4	Czech Republic	9	6	0	3	140	106	+34	18	Round of 16
5	Chinese Taipei	9	5	0	4	124	114	+10	15	Round of 16
6	Romania	9	5	0	4	118	102	+16	15	Round of 16
7	Egypt	9	4	0	5	125	127	−2	12	Round of 16
8	Guam	9	2	0	7	77	151	−74	6	Round of 16
9	Andorra	9	1	0	8	76	161	−85	3	Eliminated
10	Indonesia	9	0	0	9	66	156	−90	0	Eliminated

18 August 2014
19:00

Andorra	10–13	Thailand
Pts: Brunet, Mana 3		Pts: Bunsinprom 6

Wutaishan Sports Center, Nanjing

19 August 2014
18:20

Belgium	22–1	Andorra
Pts: Verelst 10		Pts: Navarro 1

Wutaishan Sports Center, Nanjing

19 August 2014
21:20

Andorra	8–18	Guam
Pts: Brunet 4		Pts: Castro 12

Wutaishan Sports Center, Nanjing

20 August 2014
19:00

Andorra	13–16	Chinese Taipei
Pts: Brunet 6		Pts: Huang 8

Wutaishan Sports Center, Nanjing

22 August 2014
18:00

Czech Republic	21–7	Andorra
Pts: Berankova 7		Pts: Navarro 5

Wutaishan Sports Center, Nanjing

22 August 2014
21:20

Andorra	5–22	United States
Pts: Brunet, Vidal 2		Pts: Ogunbowale 9

Wutaishan Sports Center, Nanjing

23 August 2014
19:20

Romania	18–8	Andorra
Pts: Peter 6		Pts: Mana 3

Wutaishan Sports Center, Nanjing

24 August 2014
17:40

Andorra	14–10	Indonesia
Pts: Brunet 8		Pts: Elvira 4

Wutaishan Sports Center, Nanjing

24 August 2014
21:20

Egypt	21–10	Andorra
Pts: El-Gedawy 8		Pts: Brunet 5

Wutaishan Sports Center, Nanjing

== Canoeing ==
Andorra was given a spot to compete from the Tripartite Commission.

Girls

Athlete	Event	Qualification		Repechage		Round of 16		Quarterfinals	Semifinals	Final / BM	Rank
Athlete	Event	Time	Rank	Time	Rank	Time	Rank	Opposition Result	Opposition Result	Opposition Result	Rank
Laura Pellicer Chica	Girls' K1 slalom	2:58.190	19 R	2:38.001	10	did not advance					18
Laura Pellicer Chica	Girls' K1 sprint	1:22.434	8 Q	—		1:21.575	8 Q	Jones (GER); L 1:26.330	did not advance		5

== Swimming ==
Andorra qualified one swimmer.

Boys

Athlete	Event	Heat		Final	
Athlete	Event	Time	Rank	Time	Rank
Pol Arias Dourdet	400 m freestyle	4:11.13	30	did not advance	
Pol Arias Dourdet	800 m freestyle	—		8:47.46	25
