= Indonesia at the 2014 Summer Youth Olympics =

- IOC code: INA
- NOC: Indonesian Olympic Committee

in Nanjing
- Competitors: 27 in 10 sports
- Flag bearer: Rendy Licardo
- Medals Ranked 80th: Gold 0 Silver 0 Bronze 1 Total 1

Summer Youth Olympics appearances (overview)
- 2010; 2014; 2018

Indonesia competed at the 2014 Summer Youth Olympics, in Nanjing, China from 16 August to 28 August 2014. 27 athletes competed for Indonesia in this Youth Summer Olympics.

== Medalists ==
Medal	Name	Sport	Event	Date
Bronze	Anthony Ginting	Badminton	Boys' Singles	22 August

== Archery ==
Indonesia qualified a female archer from its performance at the 2013 World Archery Youth Championships and a male archer from its performance at the 2013 Asian Archery Championships.

Individual

Athlete	Event	Ranking round		Round of 32	Round of 16	Quarterfinals	Semifinals	Final / BM	Rank
Athlete	Event	Score	Rank	Opposition Score	Opposition Score	Opposition Score	Opposition Score	Opposition Score	Rank
Hendra Purnama	Boys' Individual	633	24	Florian Faber (SUI); L 2-6	Did not advance				17
Diananda Choirunisa	Girls' Individual	673	2	Hana Elshimy (EGY); W 6-0	Ana Machado (BRA); L 5-6	Did not advance			9

Team

Athletes	Event	Round of 32	Round of 16	Quarterfinals	Semifinals	Final / BM	Rank
Athletes	Event	Opposition Score	Opposition Score	Opposition Score	Opposition Score	Opposition Score	Rank
Hendra Purnama (INA); Yasemin Anagoz (TUR)	Mixed Team	Dachev (BUL) / Boda (IND); L 4-5	Did not advance				17
Min Thiha Kyaw (MYA); Diananda Choirunisa (INA)	Mixed Team	Fregnan (ITA) / Sutton (AUS); L 3-5	Did not advance				17

== Athletics ==
Indonesia qualified one athlete.

Qualification Legend: Q=Final A (medal); qB=Final B (non-medal)

Girls
Field events

Athlete	Event	Qualification		Final	
Athlete	Event	Distance	Rank	Distance	Rank
Jelita Idea	Pole vault	3.55 m	10 qB	3.75 m	9

== Badminton ==
Indonesia qualified two athletes based on the 2 May 2014 BWF Junior World Rankings.

Singles

Athlete	Event	Group stage				Quarterfinal	Semifinal	Final / BM	Rank
Athlete	Event	Opposition Score	Opposition Score	Opposition Score	Rank	Opposition Score	Opposition Score	Opposition Score	Rank
Anthony Ginting	Boys' Singles	Mananga Nzoussi (CGO); W (21–6, 21–4)	Abdelhakim (EGY); W (21-9, 21-11)	Angodavidanalage (SRI); W (21-10, 23-21)	1 QF	Tsuneyama (JPN); W (21-8, 14-21, 21-12)	Guipu (CHN); L (21-19, 19-21, 17-21) BM	Joshi (IND); W (21-17, 21-16)	3rd place, bronze medalist(s)
Ruselli Hartawan	Girls' Singles	Lai (AUS); W (21–13, 22-20)	Konieczna (POL); W (21–13, 21-10)	Gadde (IND); W (21–14, 21-15)	1 QF	Yamaguchi (JPN); L (6–21, 21-18, 11-21)	Did not advance		5

Doubles

Athlete	Event	Group stage				Quarterfinal	Semifinal	Final / BM	Rank
Athlete	Event	Opposition Score	Opposition Score	Opposition Score	Rank	Opposition Score	Opposition Score	Opposition Score	Rank
Katarina Beton (SLO); Anthony Ginting (INA)	Mixed Doubles	Ishaak (SUR); Weisskirchen (GER); W (21–16, 21-8)	Pavlinic (CRO); Kurt (TUR); W (21–18, 21-19)	Heim (GER); Shiskhov (BUL); W (21–19, 21-9)	1 QF	He (CHN); Angoda (SRI); L (21–18, 17-21, 17-21)	Did not advance		5
Ruselli Hartawan (INA); Daniel Guda (AUS)	Mixed Doubles	Blichfeldt (DEN); Mananga Nzoussi (CGO); W (21–10, 21-7)	Cadeau (SEY); Penalver Pereira (ESP); W (21–12, 21-19)	Qin (CHN); Narongrit (THA); L (13-21, 19-21)	2	Did not advance			9

Legend: F= Advanced to Final; BM= Advanced to Bronze-medal match; SF= Advanced to Semi Final; QF=Advanced to Semi Final

== Basketball ==
Indonesia qualified a boys' and girls' team based on the 1 June 2014 FIBA 3x3 National Federation Rankings.

Skills Competition

Athlete	Event	Qualification				Final			
Athlete	Event	Round 1	Round 2	Total	Rank	Round 1	Round 2	Total	Rank
Vincent Kosasih	Boys' Dunk Contest	17	23	40	10	Did not advance			

Athlete	Event	Qualification			Final		
Athlete	Event	Points	Time	Rank	Points	Time	Rank
Ni Nyoman Astari	Girls' Shoot-out Contest	0	26.0	60	Did not advance		
Calista Elvira	Girls' Shoot-out Contest	2	26.6	53	Did not advance		
Regita Pramesti	Girls' Shoot-out Contest	5	21.5	9	Did not advance		
Ida Ayu Wijaya	Girls' Shoot-out Contest	0	25.1	59	Did not advance		

=== Boys' tournament ===
Roster

- Kurniawan Indraprasto
- Vincent Kosasih
- Rivaldo Pangesthio
- Widyanta Teja

Group stage

Pos	Team	Pld	W	L	PF	PA	PD	Pts	Qualification
1	Lithuania	9	9	0	165	129	+36	18	Round of 16
2	Slovenia	9	7	2	152	120	+32	16	Round of 16
3	China	9	6	3	164	143	+21	15 (Note: CHN +1, PUR −1)	Round of 16
4	Puerto Rico	9	6	3	152	136	+16	15	Round of 16
5	Poland	9	5	4	153	127	+26	14	Round of 16
6	France	9	4	5	151	127	+24	13	Round of 16
7	Hungary	9	3	6	158	165	−7	12	Round of 16
8	Uruguay	9	2	7	103	154	−51	11 (Note: URU +1, GER −1)	Round of 16
9	Germany	9	2	7	118	149	−31	11	Eliminated
10	Indonesia	9	1	8	86	152	−66	10	Eliminated

Notes:

18 August 2014
17:40

Uruguay	11–10	Indonesia

Wutaishan Sports Center, Nanjing

18 August 2014
21:00

Indonesia	13–14	Lithuania

Wutaishan Sports Center, Nanjing

19 August 2014
18:40

Poland	17–3	Indonesia

Wutaishan Sports Center, Nanjing

20 August 2014
17:20

Indonesia	7–21	France

Wutaishan Sports Center, Nanjing

20 August 2014
21:40

Puerto Rico	15–13	Indonesia

Wutaishan Sports Center, Nanjing

22 August 2014
19:20

Slovenia	21–6	Indonesia

Wutaishan Sports Center, Nanjing

23 August 2014
17:00

Indonesia	10–22	China

Wutaishan Sports Center, Nanjing

23 August 2014
20:40

Hungary	22–14	Indonesia

Wutaishan Sports Center, Nanjing

24 August 2014
19:40

Indonesia	10–9	Germany

Wutaishan Sports Center, Nanjing

=== Girls' tournament ===
Roster

- Ni Nyoman Astari
- Calista Elvira
- Regita Pramesti
- Ida Ayu Wijaya

Group stage

Pos	Team	Pld	W	D	L	PF	PA	PD	Pts	Qualification
1	United States	9	9	0	0	190	54	+136	27	Round of 16
2	Belgium	9	7	0	2	136	75	+61	21	Round of 16
3	Thailand	9	6	0	3	96	102	−6	18	Round of 16
4	Czech Republic	9	6	0	3	140	106	+34	18	Round of 16
5	Chinese Taipei	9	5	0	4	124	114	+10	15	Round of 16
6	Romania	9	5	0	4	118	102	+16	15	Round of 16
7	Egypt	9	4	0	5	125	127	−2	12	Round of 16
8	Guam	9	2	0	7	77	151	−74	6	Round of 16
9	Andorra	9	1	0	8	76	161	−85	3	Eliminated
10	Indonesia	9	0	0	9	66	156	−90	0	Eliminated

18 August 2014
19:40

Czech Republic	16–9	Indonesia

Wutaishan Sports Center, Nanjing

19 August 2014
17:20

Indonesia	2–21	United States

Wutaishan Sports Center, Nanjing

19 August 2014
21:40

Romania	20–8	Indonesia

Wutaishan Sports Center, Nanjing

20 August 2014
19:20

Guam	14–11	Indonesia

Wutaishan Sports Center, Nanjing

22 August 2014
18:20

Indonesia	11–18	Egypt

Wutaishan Sports Center, Nanjing

22 August 2014
20:20

Thailand	16–9	Indonesia

Wutaishan Sports Center, Nanjing

23 August 2014
19:40

Indonesia	1–22	Belgium

Wutaishan Sports Center, Nanjing

24 August 2014
17:40

Andorra	14–10	Indonesia

Wutaishan Sports Center, Nanjing

24 August 2014
20:20

Indonesia	5–15	Chinese Taipei

Wutaishan Sports Center, Nanjing

== Beach volleyball ==
Indonesia qualified a boys' and girls' team by their performance at the AVC qualification tournament.

Athletes	Event	Preliminary round	Standing	Round of 24	Round of 16	Quarterfinals	Semifinals	Final / BM	Rank
Athletes	Event	Opposition Score	Standing	Opposition Score	Opposition Score	Opposition Score	Opposition Score	Opposition Score	Rank
Mohammad Ashfiya; Rendy Licardo	Boys'	Richard – Defalco (USA); W 2 – 0 (21-14, 22-20)	2 Q	Siddihaluge – Mallawa Thanthrige (SRI); W 2 – 0 (21-12, 21-14)	Maattanen – Siren (FIN); L 0 - 2 (14-21, 21-17, 10-15)	Did not advance			9
Mohammad Ashfiya; Rendy Licardo	Boys'	Pristauz – Kratz (AUT); W 2 – 0 (21-17, 21-19)	2 Q	Siddihaluge – Mallawa Thanthrige (SRI); W 2 – 0 (21-12, 21-14)	Maattanen – Siren (FIN); L 0 - 2 (14-21, 21-17, 10-15)	Did not advance			9
Mohammad Ashfiya; Rendy Licardo	Boys'	Ndagano – Ndayisabye (RWA); W 2 – 0 (21-14, 21-13)	2 Q	Siddihaluge – Mallawa Thanthrige (SRI); W 2 – 0 (21-12, 21-14)	Maattanen – Siren (FIN); L 0 - 2 (14-21, 21-17, 10-15)	Did not advance			9
Mohammad Ashfiya; Rendy Licardo	Boys'	Kmiecik – Macura (POL); W 2 – 0 (21-18, 21-18)	2 Q	Siddihaluge – Mallawa Thanthrige (SRI); W 2 – 0 (21-12, 21-14)	Maattanen – Siren (FIN); L 0 - 2 (14-21, 21-17, 10-15)	Did not advance			9
Mohammad Ashfiya; Rendy Licardo	Boys'	Gomez – Hernandez (VEN); L 0 - 2 (15-21, 16-21)	2 Q	Siddihaluge – Mallawa Thanthrige (SRI); W 2 – 0 (21-12, 21-14)	Maattanen – Siren (FIN); L 0 - 2 (14-21, 21-17, 10-15)	Did not advance			9
Riski Andriani; Nanda Ragillia	Girls'	Wang – Yuan (CHN); W 2 – 0 (21-17, 22-20)	2 Q	Medina – Colon (PUR); L 0 - 2 (15-21, 11-21)	Did not advance				17
Riski Andriani; Nanda Ragillia	Girls'	Ward – Davidson (TRI); W 2 – 0 (21-17, 21-12)	2 Q	Medina – Colon (PUR); L 0 - 2 (15-21, 11-21)	Did not advance				17
Riski Andriani; Nanda Ragillia	Girls'	Schneider – Arnholdt (GER); L 0 - 2 (17-21, 13-21)	2 Q	Medina – Colon (PUR); L 0 - 2 (15-21, 11-21)	Did not advance				17
Riski Andriani; Nanda Ragillia	Girls'	Maida – Vargas (BOL); W 2 – 0 (21-17, 21-18)	2 Q	Medina – Colon (PUR); L 0 - 2 (15-21, 11-21)	Did not advance				17
Riski Andriani; Nanda Ragillia	Girls'	Nkoka Ndoungou – Moyipele (CGO); W 2 – 0 (21-5, 21-11)	2 Q	Medina – Colon (PUR); L 0 - 2 (15-21, 11-21)	Did not advance				17

== Rowing ==
Indonesia qualified one boat based on its performance at the Asian Qualification Regatta.

Athlete	Event	Heats		Repechage		Semifinals		Final	
Athlete	Event	Time	Rank	Time	Rank	Time	Rank	Time	Rank
Denri Al Ghiffari	Boys' Single Sculls	3:44.87	5 R	3:37.25	4 SC/D	3:38.04	4 FD	3:41.28	19

Qualification Legend: FA=Final A (medal); FB=Final B (non-medal); FC=Final C (non-medal); FD=Final D (non-medal); SA/B=Semifinals A/B; SC/D=Semifinals C/D; R=Repechage

== Sailing ==
Indonesia qualified two boats based on its performance at the Byte CII Asian Continental Qualifier.

Athlete	Event	Race											Net Points	Final Rank
Athlete	Event	1	2	3	4	5	6	7	8	9	10	M*	Net Points	Final Rank
Ahmad Zainuddin	Boys' Byte CII	12	10	20	(21)	19	17	17	12	Cancelled		128.00	107.00	19
Kirana Wardojo	Girls' Byte CII	(31); DSQ	31; DNE	28	28	31; DSQ	24	8	16	Cancelled		197.00	166.00	27

== Shooting ==
Indonesia was given a wild card to compete.

Individual

Athlete	Event	Qualification		Final	
Athlete	Event	Points	Rank	Points	Rank
Niko Alvian	Boys' 10m Air Rifle	610.1	11	Did not advance	

Team

Athletes	Event	Qualification		Round of 16	Quarterfinals	Semifinals	Final / BM	Rank
Athletes	Event	Points	Rank	Opposition Result	Opposition Result	Opposition Result	Opposition Result	Rank
Niko Alvian (INA); Lia Borgo Torres (MEX)	Mixed Team 10m Air Rifle	822.6	3 Q	Laurens (RSA)/ Babic (CRO); L 6-10	Did not advance			17

== Swimming ==
Indonesia qualified four swimmers.

Boys

Athlete	Event	Heat		Semifinal		Final	
Athlete	Event	Time	Rank	Time	Rank	Time	Rank
Ricky Anggawidjaja	50 m backstroke	27.07	23	Did not advance			
Ricky Anggawidjaja	100 m backstroke	57.50	21	Did not advance			
Ricky Anggawidjaja	200 m backstroke	2:05.72	17	—N/a		Did not advance	
Muhammad Hamgari	200 m butterfly	2:07.55	21	—N/a		Did not advance	

Girls

Athlete	Event	Heat		Semifinal		Final	
Athlete	Event	Time	Rank	Time	Rank	Time	Rank
Olivia Fernandez	200 m butterfly	2:19.64	23	—N/a		Did not advance	
Monalisa Lorenza	200 m butterfly	2:13.08	7	—N/a		2:13.68	7

== Weightlifting ==
Indonesia qualified 1 quota in the girls' events based on the team ranking after the 2013 Weightlifting Youth World Championships. Indonesia later qualified 1 quota in the boys' events based on the team ranking after the 2014 Asian Weightlifting Youth & Junior Championships.

Boys

Athlete	Event	Snatch		Clean & jerk		Total	Rank
Athlete	Event	Result	Rank	Result	Rank	Total	Rank
Firdy Ghivari	−62 kg	102	7	121	7	223	7

Girls

Athlete	Event	Snatch		Clean & jerk		Total	Rank
Athlete	Event	Result	Rank	Result	Rank	Total	Rank
Acchedya Jagaddhita	−58 kg	79	3	92	5	171	4
