= New Zealand at the 2014 Summer Youth Olympics =

- IOC code: NZL
- NOC: New Zealand Olympic Committee
- Website: www.olympic.org.nz

in Nanjing
- Competitors: 50 in 15 sports
- Flag bearer (opening): Gabrielle Fa'amausili
- Flag bearer (closing): Emily Fraser
- Medals Ranked 34th: Gold 2 Silver 1 Bronze 2 Total 5

Summer Youth Olympics appearances
- 2010; 2014; 2018; 2026

New Zealand competed at the 2014 Summer Youth Olympics, in Nanjing, China from 16 August to 28 August 2014.

== Medalists ==
Medal	Name	Sport	Event	Date
Gold	Dylan Schmidt	Gymnastics	Boys' trampoline	22 Aug
Gold	Emily Fraser	Equestrian	Individual jumping	24 Aug
Silver	Daniel Hoy	Triathlon	Boys	18 Aug
Bronze	Bobbi Gichard	Swimming	Girls' 100 m backstroke	18 Aug
Bronze	Gabrielle Fa'amausili	Swimming	Girls' 50 m backstroke	21 Aug
Bronze	Daniel Hoy; Elizabeth Stannard	Triathlon	Mixed Relay	21 Aug

== Basketball ==
New Zealand qualified a boys' team based on the 1 June 2014 FIBA 3x3 National Federation Rankings.

=== Boys' tournament ===
Roster

- Isaac Davidson
- Izayah Mauriohooho-Le'afa
- Ray Penny
- Sam Timmins

Group Stage

Pos	Team	Pld	W	L	PF	PA	PD	Pts	Qualification
1	Argentina	9	7	2	156	101	+55	16	Round of 16
2	Russia	9	7	2	153	117	+36	16	Round of 16
3	Spain	9	7	2	145	135	+10	16	Round of 16
4	New Zealand	9	6	3	145	129	+16	15	Round of 16
5	Venezuela	9	5	4	136	128	+8	14	Round of 16
6	Brazil	9	4	5	116	92	+24	13 (Note: BRA +5, ROU −5)	Round of 16
7	Romania	9	4	5	130	122	+8	13	Round of 16
8	Tunisia	9	3	6	115	130	−15	12	Round of 16
9	Andorra	9	2	7	129	168	−39	11	Eliminated
10	Guatemala	9	0	9	74	177	−103	9	Eliminated

Notes:

18 August 2014
18:20

New Zealand	18–13	Guatemala

Wutaishan Sports Center, Nanjing

18 August 2014
20:40

Venezuela	15–16	New Zealand

Wutaishan Sports Center, Nanjing

19 August 2014
18:40

New Zealand	9–14	Argentina

Wutaishan Sports Center, Nanjing

20 August 2014
17:00

Tunisia	15–17	New Zealand

Wutaishan Sports Center, Nanjing

20 August 2014
21:00

New Zealand	21–16	Andorra

Wutaishan Sports Center, Nanjing

22 August 2014
19:40

Spain	14–21	New Zealand

Wutaishan Sports Center, Nanjing

23 August 2014
17:20

New Zealand	8–9	Brazil

Wutaishan Sports Center, Nanjing

23 August 2014
21:40

Romania	15–19	New Zealand

Wutaishan Sports Center, Nanjing

24 August 2014
19:20

New Zealand	16–18	Russia

Wutaishan Sports Center, Nanjing

Round of 16

25 August 2014

Poland	16–14	New Zealand

Wutaishan Sports Center, Nanjing

Knockout Stage

Round of 16	Quarterfinals	Semifinals	Final	Rank
Opposition Score	Opposition Score	Opposition Score	Opposition Score	Rank
Poland; L 14–16	did not advance			11

== Beach Volleyball ==
New Zealand qualified a boys' team by their performance at the AVC Qualification Tournament.

Athletes	Event	Preliminary round	Standing	Round of 24	Round of 16	Quarterfinals	Semifinals	Final / BM	Rank
Athletes	Event	Opposition Score	Standing	Opposition Score	Opposition Score	Opposition Score	Opposition Score	Opposition Score	Rank
Nate Moore; Kahurangi Robinson	Boys'	Moussa (CGO)/ Ossolo (CGO); W 2–0	3 Q	Jongklang (THA)/ Nakprakhong (THA); L 0–2	did not advance				25
Nate Moore; Kahurangi Robinson	Boys'	Navickas (LTU)/ Vaskelis (LTU)	3 Q	Jongklang (THA)/ Nakprakhong (THA); L 0–2	did not advance				25
Nate Moore; Kahurangi Robinson	Boys'	Lanci (BRA)/ Wanderley (BRA); L 0–2	3 Q	Jongklang (THA)/ Nakprakhong (THA); L 0–2	did not advance				25
Nate Moore; Kahurangi Robinson	Boys'	Shavar (JAM)/ Hutchinson (JAM)	3 Q	Jongklang (THA)/ Nakprakhong (THA); L 0–2	did not advance				25
Nate Moore; Kahurangi Robinson	Boys'	Rudolf (GER)/ Stadie (GER); L 0–2	3 Q	Jongklang (THA)/ Nakprakhong (THA); L 0–2	did not advance				25

== Canoeing ==
New Zealand qualified one boat based on its performance at the 2013 World Junior Canoe Sprint and Slalom Championships.

Girls

Athlete	Event	Qualification		Repechage		Round of 16		Quarterfinals	Semifinals	Final / BM	Rank
Athlete	Event	Time	Rank	Time	Rank	Time	Rank	Opposition Result	Opposition Result	Opposition Result	Rank
Kensa Randle	K1 slalom										
Kensa Randle	K1 sprint										

== Equestrian ==
New Zealand qualified a rider.

Athlete	Horse	Event	Round 1		Round 2			Total		Jump-Off		Rank
Athlete	Horse	Event	Penalties	Rank	Penalties	Total	Rank	Penalties	Rank	Penalties	Time	Rank
Emily Fraser	Exilio	Individual Jumping	0	1				0	1	0		1st place, gold medalist(s)
Australasia; Jake Hunter (AUS); Lennard Chiang (HKG); Sarrd Kalantari (IRI); Praveen Mathavan (MAS); Emily Fraser (NZL)	For The Star; DJ; Cristallo; Arkansas; Exilio	Team Jumping	12	4	8	20	5	20	5	—N/a		

== Fencing ==
New Zealand qualified one athlete based on its performance at the 2014 FIE Cadet World Championships.

Boys

Athlete	Event	Pool Round	Seed	Round of 16	Quarterfinals	Semifinals	Final / BM	Rank
Athlete	Event	Opposition Score	Seed	Opposition Score	Opposition Score	Opposition Score	Opposition Score	Rank
Sheldon Ogilvie	Épée	Pool 2 Yoo (USA); L 4-5; French (CAN) Kim (KOR) Elsayed (EGY) Abate (ITA)	2	French (CAN); L 14-15	did not advance			9

Mixed Team

Athletes	Event	Round of 16	Quarterfinals	Semifinals / PM	Final / PM	Rank
Athletes	Event	Opposition Score	Opposition Score	Opposition Score	Opposition Score	Rank
	Mixed Team					

== Field hockey ==
New Zealand qualified a boys' and girls' team based on its performance at the Oceania Qualification Tournament.

=== Boys' tournament ===
Roster

- David Brydon
- Robbie Capizzi
- Fynn Edwards
- Richmond Lum
- Dominic Newman
- Hayden Phillips
- Aidan Sarikaya
- Dylan Thomas
- Mac Wilcox

Group Stage

Pos	Team	Pld	W	D	L	GF	GA	GD	Pts	Qualification
1	New Zealand	4	3	1	0	28	12	+16	10	Quarterfinals
2	Pakistan	4	3	1	0	27	12	+15	10	Quarterfinals
3	Mexico	4	1	0	3	11	20	−9	3	Quarterfinals
4	Zambia	4	1	0	3	14	24	−10	3	Quarterfinals
5	Germany	4	1	0	3	10	22	−12	3	

Source: FIH
Rules for classification: 1) points; 2) goal difference; 3) goals scored; 4) head-to-head result.

17 August 2014
18:00

New Zealand	8–2	Zambia
Phillips 5', 10', 36'; Capizzi 8'; Brydon 14'; Sarikaya 24'; Newman 26', 33'	Report	Lowole 12'; Bwalya 19'

Umpires:
Sompop Boonsong (THA)
Oliver Tarnoczi (AUT)

18 August 2014
21:00

New Zealand	8–1	Mexico
Newman 3'; Lum 9', 17'; Brydon 11', 21'; Wilcox 12', 29'; Phillips 23'	Report	Martinez 26'

Umpires:
Aziz Adimah (GHA)
Scott Embry (AUS)

20 August 2014
16:30

New Zealand	6–3	Germany
Capizzi 10'; Brydon 13'; Thomas 20'; Newman 23'; Phillips 33', 35'	Report	Schneider 17', 29'; Korber 19'

Umpires:
Scott Embry (AUS)
Oliver Tarnoczi (AUT)

21 August 2014
19:00

Pakistan	6–6	New Zealand
Atiq 15', 27'; Irshad 18', 30'; Ali 29'; Kamal 31'	Report	Brydon 2'; Sarikaya 7'; Capizzi 12'; Newman 13'; Thomas 14', 22'

Umpires:
Donovan Simmons (BER)
Duvaughn Henlon (JAM)

Quarterfinal

23 August 2014
21:00

New Zealand	0–3	South Africa
	Report	Ntuli 4', 18', 26'

Umpires:
Aziz Adimah (GHA)
Duvaughn Henlon (JAM)

Crossover

25 August 2014
17:30

New Zealand	9–2	Mexico
Thomas 3', 15', 20', 24'; Lum 6', 7', 12', 29'; Capizzi 16'	Report	Falcon 8'; Martinez 17'

Umpires:
Paul Walker (GBR)
Epeli Tukuca (FIJ)

5th and 6th place

27 August 2014
17:30

Pakistan	4–3	New Zealand
Ali 14'; Yaqoob 15'; Irshad 22', 27'	Report	Capizzi 8'; Wilcox 18'; Newman 19'

Umpires:
Duvaughn Henlon (JAM)
Sherif Elamari (EGY)

=== Girls' tournament ===
Roster

- Isla Bint
- Frances Davies
- Ella Hyatt Brown
- Bridget Kiddle
- Su Arn Kwek
- Tyler Lench
- Catherine Tinning
- Casey-Mae Waddell
- Tayla White

Group Stage

Pos	Team	Pld	W	D	L	GF	GA	GD	Pts	Qualification
1	China	4	4	0	0	29	3	+26	12	Quarterfinals
2	Uruguay	4	3	0	1	19	8	+11	9	Quarterfinals
3	New Zealand	4	2	0	2	20	20	0	6	Quarterfinals
4	Germany	4	1	0	3	8	23	−15	3	Quarterfinals
5	Zambia	4	0	0	4	8	30	−22	0	

Source: FIH
Rules for classification: 1) points; 2) goal difference; 3) goals scored; 4) head-to-head result.

18 August 2014
18:00

New Zealand	10–5	Zambia
Tinning 5', 17'; Kwek 9', 24'; Brown 11', 34'; Waddell 22'; White 24'; Davies 28'; Kiddle 36'	Report	Kalomo 15', 16', 21'; Nakombe 20'; Mudenda 32'

Umpires:
Denise Pelletier (CAN)
Ivona Makar (CRO)

19 August 2014
17:30

Germany	1–4	New Zealand
Angerer 20'	Report	Brown 11', 14'; Tinning 26'; Robinson 28'

Umpires:
Toh Li Min (SIN)
Tanja Schafer (RSA)

20 August 2014
19:00

China	8–3	New Zealand
Zhang Jinrong 16', 27'; Zhang Lijia 17', 29'; Zhang Xindan 18'; Chen Yang 20'; Li Hong 23', 36'	Report	Brown 5'; Tinning 14'; Kwek 22'

Umpires:
Ana Faias (POR)
Emily Carroll (AUS)

21 August 2014
17:30

New Zealand	3–6	Uruguay
Kwek 12'; Davies 32'; Kiddle 34'	Report	Gaminara 1', 10'; Fernan 2', 22'; Galeano 6'; Saenz 27'

Umpires:
Toh Li Min (SIN)
Ivona Makar (CRO)

Quarterfinal

23 August 2014
18:00

Japan	7–1	New Zealand
Kozuka 2', 22', 36'; Mori 6', 20'; Tsubouchi 8'; Kawamura 31'	Report	Waddell 23'

Umpires:
Ana Faias (POR)
Emily Carroll (AUS)

Crossover

24 August 2014
17:30

South Africa	3–4	New Zealand
Esteves 26', 36'; Haupt 27'	Report	Brown 4'; Robinson 6'; Waddell 18'; Davies 25'

Umpires:
Liu Lijie (CHN)
Ana Escalante (MEX)

Fifth and sixth place

26 August 2014
17:30

Uruguay	4–5	New Zealand
Gaminara 5', 27', 33'; Galeano 33'	Report	Brown 8'; Waddell 14', 34'; White 28'; Robinson 30'

Umpires:
Toh Li Min (SIN)
Liu Lijie (CHN)

== Golf ==
New Zealand qualified one team of two athletes based on the 8 June 2014 IGF Combined World Amateur Golf Rankings.

Individual

Athlete	Event	Round 1		Round 2			Round 3			Total	
Athlete	Event	Score	Rank	Score	Total	Rank	Score	Total	Rank	Score	Rank
Nick Coxon	Boys	71		71	142	7					
Julianne Alvarez	Girls	70	5	73	143	4					

Team

Athletes	Event	Round 1 (Foursome)		Round 2 (Fourball)			Round 3 (Individual Stroke)				Total	
Athletes	Event	Score	Rank	Score	Total	Rank	Boy	Girl	Total	Rank	Score	Rank
Nick Coxon; Julianne Alvarez	Mixed											

== Gymnastics ==
=== Artistic Gymnastics ===
New Zealand qualified one athlete based on its performance at the 2014 Oceania Artistic Gymnastics Championships.

Girls

Athlete	Event	Apparatus				Total	Rank
Athlete	Event	F	V	UB	BB	Total	Rank
Millie Williamson	Qualification	11.400	13.600	11.150	12.200	48.350	19

=== Trampoline ===
New Zealand qualified one athlete based on its performance at the 2014 Oceania Trampoline Championships.

Athlete	Event	Qualification				Final	
Athlete	Event	Routine 1	Routine 2	Total	Rank	Score	Rank
Dylan Schmidt	Boys	44.525	53.560	98.085	4 Q	57.340	1st place, gold medalist(s)

== Rowing ==
New Zealand qualified two boats based on its performance at the 2013 World Rowing Junior Championships.

Athlete	Event	Heats		Repechage		Semifinals		Final	
Athlete	Event	Time	Rank	Time	Rank	Time	Rank	Time	Rank
Jack O'Leary	Boys' Single Sculls								
Jackie Gowler; Renee Olley	Girls' Pairs					—N/a			

Qualification Legend: FA=Final A (medal); FB=Final B (non-medal); FC=Final C (non-medal); FD=Final D (non-medal); SA/B=Semifinals A/B; SC/D=Semifinals C/D; R=Repechage

== Sailing ==
New Zealand qualified two boats based on its performance at the Techno 293 Oceania Continental Qualifiers. New Zealand later qualified one more boat based on its performance at the Byte CII Oceania Continental Qualifiers.

Athlete	Event	Race											Net Points	Final Rank
Athlete	Event	1	2	3	4	5	6	7	8	9	10	M*	Net Points	Final Rank
Alistair Gifford	Boys' Byte CII	7	~~16~~	4	16	5	9	4	canceled			19	64	10
Finn Croft	Boys' Techno 293	~~11~~	6	3	2	7	6	8	canceled				32	6
Coral Headey	Girls' Techno 293	12	~~18~~	8	18	12	18	15	canceled				83	16

== Swimming ==
New Zealand qualified four swimmers.

Boys

Athlete	Event	Heat		Semifinal		Final	
Athlete	Event	Time	Rank	Time	Rank	Time	Rank
Michael Mincham	200 m freestyle	1:52.42	16	—N/a		did not advance	
Michael Mincham	400 m freestyle	3:57.33	17	—N/a		did not advance	
Michael Mincham	800 m freestyle	—N/a				8:15.47	13
Jacob Garrod	50 m breaststroke	30.04	28	did not advance			
Jacob Garrod	100 m breaststroke	1:05.30	30	did not advance			
Jacob Garrod	200 m breaststroke	2:18.00	15	—N/a		did not advance	
Jacob Garrod	200 m individual medley	DNS		—N/a		did not advance	

Girls

Athlete	Event	Heat		Semifinal		Final	
Athlete	Event	Time	Rank	Time	Rank	Time	Rank
Gabrielle Fa'amausili	50 m freestyle	26.12	7 Q			did not advance	
Gabrielle Fa'amausili	100 m freestyle	58.38	26	did not advance			
Gabrielle Fa'amausili	50 m backstroke	28.71	1 Q	28.78	1 Q	28.69	3rd place, bronze medalist(s)
Gabrielle Fa'amausili	100 m backstroke	1:02.41	8 Q	1:03.10	11	did not advance	
Bobbi Gichard	50 m backstroke	29.50	8 Q	29.09	5 Q	29.02	6
Bobbi Gichard	100 m backstroke	1:02.39	7 Q	1:01.70	3 Q	1:01.25	3rd place, bronze medalist(s)
Bobbi Gichard	200 m backstroke	2:18.00	17	—N/a		did not advance	
Bobbi Gichard	50 m butterfly	DNS		did not advance			
Bobbi Gichard	100 m butterfly	1:06.65	29	did not advance			

Mixed

Athlete	Event	Heat		Final	
Athlete	Event	Time	Rank	Time	Rank
Gabrielle Fa'amausili; Jacob Garrod; Bobbi Gichard; Michael Mincham	4×100 m freestyle relay	3:54.38	18	did not advance	
Gabrielle Fa'amausili; Jacob Garrod; Bobbi Gichard; Michael Mincham	4×100 m medley relay	4:03.52	15	did not advance	

== Table Tennis ==
New Zealand qualified one athlete based on its performance at the Road to Nanjing series.

Singles

Athlete	Event	Group Stage	Rank	Round of 16	Quarterfinals	Semifinals	Final / BM	Rank
Athlete	Event	Opposition Score	Rank	Opposition Score	Opposition Score	Opposition Score	Opposition Score	Rank
Sophia Dong	Girls	Ort (BEL); W 1 - 3	qB					
Sophia Dong	Girls	Imre (HUN)	qB					
Sophia Dong	Girls	Kato (JPN)	qB					

Team

Athletes	Event	Group Stage	Rank	Round of 16	Quarterfinals	Semifinals	Final / BM	Rank
Athletes	Event	Opposition Score	Rank	Opposition Score	Opposition Score	Opposition Score	Opposition Score	Rank
Intercontinental 2 Sophia Dong (NZL); T'Anje Johnson (SKN)	Mixed	Hungary; L Imre (HUN); A Szudi (HUN); L 0 – 3	4 qB	Europe 3 G Piccolin (ITA); E Schmid (SUI); L 0 – 2	did not advance			25
Intercontinental 2 Sophia Dong (NZL); T'Anje Johnson (SKN)	Mixed	Belgium; L Lung (BEL); M Allegro (BEL); L 0 – 3	4 qB	Europe 3 G Piccolin (ITA); E Schmid (SUI); L 0 – 2	did not advance			25
Intercontinental 2 Sophia Dong (NZL); T'Anje Johnson (SKN)	Mixed	Hong Kong; H Doo (HKG); K Hung (HKG); L 0 – 3	4 qB	Europe 3 G Piccolin (ITA); E Schmid (SUI); L 0 – 2	did not advance			25

Qualification Legend: Q=Main Bracket (medal); qB=Consolation Bracket (non-medal)

== Triathlon ==
New Zealand qualified two athletes based on its performance at the 2014 Oceania Youth Olympic Games Qualifier.

Individual

Athlete	Event	Swim (750m)	Trans 1	Bike (20 km)	Trans 2	Run (5 km)	Total Time	Rank
Daniel Hoy	Boys	0:09:25	0:00:39	0:28:58	0:00:21	0:15:20	0:54:43	2nd place, silver medalist(s)
Elizabeth Stannard	Girls	0:10:33	0:00:46	0:31:16	0:00:35	0:20:11	1:03:21	13

Relay

Athlete	Event	Total Times per Athlete (Swim 250m, Bike 6.6 km, Run 1.8 km)	Total Group Time	Rank
Oceania 1 Brittany Dutton (AUS); Jack van Stekelenburg (AUS); Elizabeth Stannard (NZL); Daniel Hoy (NZL)	Mixed Relay	0:21:00; 0:19:49; 0:22:32; 0:19:49	01:23:10	3rd place, bronze medalist(s)

== Weightlifting ==
New Zealand qualified 1 quota in the boys' events based on the team ranking after the 2014 Weightlifting Oceania Championships.

Boys

Athlete	Event	Snatch		Clean & jerk		Total	Rank
Athlete	Event	Result	Rank	Result	Rank	Total	Rank
Cameron McTaggart	−69 kg	107	9	131	10	238	10

== Wrestling ==
New Zealand qualified five athletes based on its performance at the 2014 Oceania Cadet Championships.

Key:
- VT - Victory by Fall.
- PP - Decision by Points - the loser with technical points.
- PO - Decision by Points - the loser without technical points.

Boys

Athlete	Event	Group stage					Final / RM	Rank
Athlete	Event	Opposition Score	Opposition Score	Opposition Score	Opposition Score	Rank	Opposition Score	Rank
Tyler Corbett	Freestyle -54kg	Matevosyan (ARM); L	Aular (VEN); L	Kuatbek (KAZ); L	Guvazhokov (RUS); L 1-4	5	—N/a	9
Douglas Lloyd	Freestyle -63kg	Moore (CAN); L	Kumar (IND); L 0-4 ^{VT}	Montero (VEN); L	—N/a	4 Q	Dydasco (PLW); W 4-0	7
Matthew Downes	Greco-Roman -58kg	Abdevali (IRI); L 0-4	Kurnalaly (KAZ); L	Abdevali (RUS); L 1-4	—N/a	4 Q	de Los Santos (DOM)	
Jordan Marshall	Greco-Roman -69kg	Manville (USA); L 0-4	Mosebach (GER); L 0-4	Soto (PER); L	—N/a	4 Q	Alimov (UZB)	

Girls

Athlete	Event	Group stage				Final / RM	Rank
Athlete	Event	Opposition Score	Opposition Score	Opposition Score	Rank	Opposition Score	Rank
Marinda Bramley	Freestyle -46kg	Kim (PRK); L 0 - 4	Doncila (MDA); L 0 - 4 ^{VT}	—N/a	3 Q	Kadour (ALG); L 0 - 4 ^{VT}	6
