= Guam at the 2014 Summer Youth Olympics =

- IOC code: GUM
- NOC: Guam National Olympic Committee

in Nanjing
- Competitors: 8 in 4 sports
- Medals: Gold 0 Silver 0 Bronze 0 Total 0

Summer Youth Olympics appearances
- 2010; 2014; 2018; 2026

Guam competed at the 2014 Summer Youth Olympics, in Nanjing, China from 16 August to 28 August 2014.

== Basketball ==
Guam qualified a girls' team based on the 1 June 2014 FIBA 3x3 National Federation Rankings.

Skills Competition

Athlete	Event	Qualification			Final		
Athlete	Event	Points	Time	Rank	Points	Time	Rank
Kali Benavente	Girls' Shoot-out Contest	5	30.0	17	did not advance		
Felicia Borja	Girls' Shoot-out Contest	3	26.5	40	did not advance		
Destiny Castro	Girls' Shoot-out Contest	3	23.7	33	did not advance		
Dyonii Quitugua	Girls' Shoot-out Contest	3	29.0	45	did not advance		

=== Girls' tournament ===
Roster

- Kali Benavente
- Felicia Borja
- Destiny Castro
- Dyonii Quitugua

Group Stage

Pos	Team	Pld	W	D	L	PF	PA	PD	Pts	Qualification
1	United States	9	9	0	0	190	54	+136	27	Round of 16
2	Belgium	9	7	0	2	136	75	+61	21	Round of 16
3	Thailand	9	6	0	3	96	102	−6	18	Round of 16
4	Czech Republic	9	6	0	3	140	106	+34	18	Round of 16
5	Chinese Taipei	9	5	0	4	124	114	+10	15	Round of 16
6	Romania	9	5	0	4	118	102	+16	15	Round of 16
7	Egypt	9	4	0	5	125	127	−2	12	Round of 16
8	Guam	9	2	0	7	77	151	−74	6	Round of 16
9	Andorra	9	1	0	8	76	161	−85	3	Eliminated
10	Indonesia	9	0	0	9	66	156	−90	0	Eliminated

18 August 2014
18:40

Report

Belgium	22–7	Guam

Wutaishan Sports Center, Nanjing

19 August 2014
18:00

Report

Guam	3–16	Romania

Wutaishan Sports Center, Nanjing

19 August 2014
21:20

Report

Andorra	8–18	Guam

Wutaishan Sports Center, Nanjing

20 August 2014
19:20

Report

Guam	14–11	Indonesia

Wutaishan Sports Center, Nanjing

22 August 2014
17:20

Report

Chinese Taipei	21–9	Guam

Wutaishan Sports Center, Nanjing

22 August 2014
21:00

Report

Guam	8–21	Egypt

Wutaishan Sports Center, Nanjing

23 August 2014
20:00

Report

Czech Republic	21–7	Guam

Wutaishan Sports Center, Nanjing

24 August 2014
18:00

Report

Guam	1–10	Thailand

Wutaishan Sports Center, Nanjing

24 August 2014
21:00

Report

United States	21–10	Guam

Wutaishan Sports Center, Nanjing

Round of 16

24 August 2014
21:00

Report

Guam	1–17	Netherlands

Wutaishan Sports Center, Nanjing

== Golf ==
Guam was given a team of 2 athletes to compete from the Tripartite Commission.

Individual

Athlete	Event	Round 1		Round 2			Round 3			Total	
Athlete	Event	Score	Rank	Score	Total	Rank	Score	Total	Rank	Score	Rank
Devin Hua	Boys	-2	11	+2	0	13	-1	-1	13	-1	13
Nalathai Vongjalorn	Girls	+9	28	+6	+15	28	+12	+27	28	+27	28

Team

Athletes	Event	Round 1 (Foursome)		Round 2 (Fourball)			Round 3 (Individual Stroke)				Total	
Athletes	Event	Score	Rank	Score	Total	Rank	Boy	Girl	Total	Rank	Score	Rank
Devin Hua; Nalathai Vongjalorn	Mixed	0	25	0	0	20	+6	+3	+9	26	+9	26

== Judo ==
Guam was given a quota to compete by the tripartite committee.

Individual

Athlete	Event	Round of 32	Round of 16	Quarterfinals	Semifinals	Rep 1	Rep 2	Rep 3	Rep 4	Final / BM	Rank
Athlete	Event	Opposition Result	Opposition Result	Opposition Result	Opposition Result	Opposition Result	Opposition Result	Opposition Result	Opposition Result	Opposition Result	Rank
Vandric Castro	Boys' -66 kg	J Florimont (FRA); L 0000 – 1000	did not advance			T Tsend-Ochir (MGL); L 0002 – 1001	did not advance				17

== Wrestling ==
Guam qualified one athlete based on its performance at the 2014 Oceania Cadet Championships.

Key:

- VT - Victory by Fall.
- PP - Decision by Points - the loser with technical points.
- PO - Decision by Points - the loser without technical points.

Girls

Athlete	Event	Group stage				Final / RM	Rank
Athlete	Event	Opposition Score	Opposition Score	Opposition Score	Rank	Opposition Score	Rank
Mia-Lahnee Aquino	Freestyle -60kg	X Pei (CHN); L 0 – 4	L Stans (RSA); L 1 – 4	S Parra (COL); L 0 – 4	4 Q	N Mbouma (CGO); W 4 – 0	7
