= Saint Kitts and Nevis at the 2014 Summer Youth Olympics =

- IOC code: SKN
- NOC: St. Kitts and Nevis Olympic Committee

in Nanjing
- Competitors: 3 in 2 sports
- Medals: Gold 0 Silver 0 Bronze 0 Total 0

Summer Youth Olympics appearances
- 2010; 2014; 2018

Saint Kitts and Nevis competed at the 2014 Summer Youth Olympics, in Nanjing, China from 16 August to 28 August 2014.

== Athletics ==
Saint Kitts and Nevis qualified two athletes.

Qualification Legend: Q=Final A (medal); qB=Final B (non-medal); qC=Final C (non-medal); qD=Final D (non-medal); qE=Final E (non-medal)

Boys
Track & road events

Athlete	Event	Heats		Final	
Athlete	Event	Result	Rank	Result	Rank
Akeem Chumney	400 m hurdles	53.00 PB	8 Q	53.26	8

Girls
Field events

Athlete	Event	Qualification		Final	
Athlete	Event	Distance	Rank	Distance	Rank
Kristal Liburd	Long jump	5.79	5 Q	5.92	5

== Table Tennis ==
Saint Kitts and Nevis was given a quota to compete by the tripartite committee.

Singles

Athlete	Event	Group Stage	Rank	Round of 16	Quarterfinals	Semifinals	Final / BM	Rank
Athlete	Event	Opposition Score	Rank	Opposition Score	Opposition Score	Opposition Score	Opposition Score	Rank
T'Anje Johnson	Boys	Group B K Ort (GER); L 0 – 3	4 qB	A Levenko (AUT); L w/o	did not advance			25
T'Anje Johnson	Boys	M Allegro (BEL); L 0 – 3	4 qB	A Levenko (AUT); L w/o	did not advance			25
T'Anje Johnson	Boys	Y Muramatsu (JPN); L 0 – 3	4 qB	A Levenko (AUT); L w/o	did not advance			25

Team

Athletes	Event	Group Stage	Rank	Round of 16	Quarterfinals	Semifinals	Final / BM	Rank
Athletes	Event	Opposition Score	Rank	Opposition Score	Opposition Score	Opposition Score	Opposition Score	Rank
Intercontinental 2 Sophia Dong (NZL); T'Anje Johnson (SKN)	Mixed	Hungary; L Imre (HUN); A Szudi (HUN); L 0 – 3	4 qB	Europe 3 G Piccolin (ITA); E Schmid (SUI); L 0 – 2	did not advance			25
Intercontinental 2 Sophia Dong (NZL); T'Anje Johnson (SKN)	Mixed	Belgium; L Lung (BEL); M Allegro (BEL); L 0 – 3	4 qB	Europe 3 G Piccolin (ITA); E Schmid (SUI); L 0 – 2	did not advance			25
Intercontinental 2 Sophia Dong (NZL); T'Anje Johnson (SKN)	Mixed	Hong Kong; H Doo (HKG); K Hung (HKG); L 0 – 3	4 qB	Europe 3 G Piccolin (ITA); E Schmid (SUI); L 0 – 2	did not advance			25

Qualification Legend: Q=Main Bracket (medal); qB=Consolation Bracket (non-medal)
