= Athletics at the 2014 Summer Youth Olympics – Boys' shot put =

Athletics – Boys' shot put at the II Summer Youth Olympic Games
- Venue: Nanjing Olympic Sports Centre
- Date: August 21–24
- Competitors: 15 from 15 nations

Medalists
| 1st place, gold medalist(s) | | Konrad Bukowiecki | Poland |
| 2nd place, silver medalist(s) | | Andrei Rares Toader | Romania |
| 3rd place, bronze medalist(s) | | Merten Howe | Germany |

The boys’ shot put competition at the 2014 Summer Youth Olympics was held on 21–24 August 2014 in Nanjing Olympic Sports Center.

== Schedule ==
| Date | Time | Round |
|---|---|---|
| 21 August 2014 | 18:35 | Qualification |
| 24 August 2014 | 19:10 | Final |

== Results ==
=== Qualification ===
The first 50% of the athletes from the Qualification round progress to the A Final. The remaining athletes progress to the B Final.

| Rank | Athlete | 1 | 2 | 3 | 4 | Result | Notes | Q |
|---|---|---|---|---|---|---|---|---|
| 1 | Konrad Bukowiecki (POL) | 22.34 | x | x | x | 22.34 | | FA |
| 2 | Andrei Rares Toader (ROU) | 20.43 | 20.63 | x | x | 20.63 | | FA |
| 3 | Merten Howe (GER) | x | 18.85 | 19.26 | 19.89 | 19.89 | | FA |
| 4 | Jason van Rooyen (RSA) | 19.38 | 19.35 | 19.73 | x | 19.73 | PB | FA |
| 5 | Kert Piirimäe (EST) | 18.98 | 18.55 | 19.36 | x | 19.36 | | FA |
| 6 | Leonardo Fabbri (ITA) | x | 18.25 | 18.91 | 19.17 | 19.17 | PB | FA |
| 7 | Julián Pereira (ARG) | x | 18.78 | x | x | 18.78 | PB | FA |
| 8 | Shehab Abdulaziz (EGY) | 17.84 | 18.67 | 17.52 | 18.13 | 18.67 | PB | FA |
| 9 | Karolis Maisuradze (LTU) | 16.67 | 17.14 | 17.58 | x | 17.58 | | FB |
| 10 | Giorgi Mujaridze (GEO) | x | 17.16 | 17.40 | 17.57 | 17.57 | | FB |
| 11 | Otoniel Badjana (GBS) | 17.36 | x | 16.36 | x | 17.36 | PB | FB |
| 12 | Alejandro Castillo (MEX) | 17.00 | 16.43 | 16.76 | 17.10 | 17.10 | | FB |
| 13 | Oguzhan Özdayi (TUR) | 16.52 | 16.06 | 16.92 | 16.92 | 19.92 | PB | FB |
| 14 | Edilberto González (PUR) | 16.67 | 15.57 | 16.67 | 15.58 | 16.67 | | FB |
| 15 | Ludovic Besson (FRA) | 16.43 | 16.33 | 16.56 | 16.63 | 16.63 | | FB |

=== Finals ===
==== Final A ====
| Rank | Final Placing | Athlete | 1 | 2 | 3 | 4 | Result | Notes |
|---|---|---|---|---|---|---|---|---|
| 1st place, gold medalist(s) | 1 | Konrad Bukowiecki (POL) | 22.09 | 23.17 | 22.57 | x | 23.17 | PB |
| 2nd place, silver medalist(s) | 2 | Andrei Rares Toader (ROU) | x | 20.83 | x | 21.00 | 21.00 | |
| 3rd place, bronze medalist(s) | 3 | Merten Howe (GER) | 19.41 | 20.13 | x | x | 20.13 | |
| 4 | 4 | Jason van Rooyen (RSA) | 18.92 | 19.27 | x | 19.82 | 19.82 | PB |
| 5 | 5 | Kert Piirimäe (EST) | x | x | 19.21 | 19.55 | 19.55 | |
| 6 | 6 | Shehab Abdulaziz (EGY) | 17.46 | 18.67 | 19.03 | 19.17 | 19.17 | PB |
| 7 | 7 | Leonardo Fabbri (ITA) | x | 18.96 | 18.59 | 18.88 | 18.96 | |
| 8 | 8 | Julián Pereira (ARG) | x | x | 18.64 | 17.53 | 18.64 | |

==== Final B ====
| Rank | Final Placing | Athlete | 1 | 2 | 3 | 4 | Result | Notes |
|---|---|---|---|---|---|---|---|---|
| 1 | 9 | Alejandro Castillo (MEX) | 17.16 | x | 18.08 | x | 18.08 | |
| 2 | 10 | Giorgi Mujaridze (GEO) | 17.90 | x | 17.69 | 16.96 | 17.90 | |
| 3 | 11 | Karolis Maisuradze (LTU) | 17.31 | 17.59 | 17.81 | x | 17.81 | |
| 4 | 12 | Otoniel Badjana (GBS) | 16.66 | 16.59 | 17.71 | x | 17.71 | PB |
| 5 | 13 | Ludovic Besson (FRA) | 16.67 | 17.26 | 17.12 | 16.90 | 17.26 | |
| 6 | 14 | Edilberto González (PUR) | 16.83 | 16.90 | 15.77 | 16.06 | 16.90 | |
| 7 | 15 | Oguzhan Özdayi (TUR) | 16.78 | x | 16.51 | 16.13 | 16.78 | |
