= Belgium at the 2014 Summer Youth Olympics =

- IOC code: BEL
- NOC: Belgian Olympic Committee
- Website: www.teambelgium.be

in Nanjing
- Competitors: 33 in 13 sports
- Flag bearer: Indra Craen
- Medals Ranked 57th: Gold 0 Silver 2 Bronze 4 Total 6

Summer Youth Olympics appearances (overview)
- 2010; 2014; 2018

Belgium competed at the 2014 Summer Youth Olympics, in Nanjing, China from 16 August to 28 August 2014.

== Medalists ==
Medal	Name	Sport	Event	Date
Silver	Indra Craen	Taekwondo	Girls' −49 kg	18 August
Silver	Luka van den Keybus	Gymnastics	Boys' Horizontal Bar	24 August
Bronze	Jorre Verstraeten	Judo	Boys' −55 kg	17 August
Bronze	Si Mohamed Ketbi	Taekwondo	Boys' −55 kg	18 August
Bronze	Laura Roebben	Taekwondo	Girls' −55 kg	19 August
Bronze	Chloë Beaucarne	Athletics	Girls' 100 m hurdles	23 August

== Archery ==
Belgium qualified a male archer from its performance at the 2013 World Archery Youth Championships.

Individual

Athlete	Event	Ranking round		Round of 32	Round of 16	Quarterfinals	Semifinals	Final / BM	Rank
Athlete	Event	Score	Seed	Opposition Score	Opposition Score	Opposition Score	Opposition Score	Opposition Score	Rank
Rick Martens	Boys' Individual	666	14	Dubrova (BLR); W 7–3	D’Almeida (BRA); L 4–6	Did not advance			9

Team

Athletes	Event	Round of 32	Round of 16	Quarterfinals	Semifinals	Final / BM	Rank
Athletes	Event	Opposition Score	Opposition Score	Opposition Score	Opposition Score	Opposition Score	Rank
Rick Martens (BEL); Regina Romero (GUA)	Mixed Team	Elsehely (EGY); Lee (KOR); W 5–3	Dubrova (BLR); Pitman (GBR); W 5–1	Han (TPE); Kazanskaya (BLR); W 6–2	Freywald (GER); Zolkepeli (MAS); L 2–6	Peters (CAN); Tuokkola (FIN); L 2–6	4

== Athletics ==
Belgium qualified four athletes.

Qualification Legend: Q=Final A (medal); qB=Final B (non-medal); qC=Final C (non-medal); qD=Final D (non-medal); qE=Final E (non-medal)

Girls
Track & road events

Athlete	Event	Heats		Final	
Athlete	Event	Result	Rank	Result	Rank
Lotte Scheldeman	800 m	2:09.94	3 Q	2:07.83	5
Chloë Beaucarne	100 m hurdles	13.46	2 Q	13.61	3rd place, bronze medalist(s)

Field events

Athlete	Event	Qualification		Final	
Athlete	Event	Distance	Position	Distance	Position
Hanne Maudens	Long jump	6.07	2 Q	6.04	4
Claire Orcel	High jump	DNS qB		DNS	

== Basketball ==
Belgium qualified a girls' team based on the 1 June 2014 FIBA 3x3 National Federation Rankings.

Skills Competition

Athlete	Event	Qualification		Final	
Athlete	Event	Points	Rank	Points	Rank
Aline Verelst	Girls' Shoot-out Contest	6	7	Did not advance	
Eline Maesschalck	Girls' Shoot-out Contest	3	32	Did not advance	
Fauve Bastiaenssen	Girls' Shoot-out Contest	1	58	Did not advance	

=== Girls' tournament ===
Roster

- Fauve Bastiaenssen
- Eline Maesschalck
- Laeticia Mpoyi Wa Mpoyi
- Aline Verelst

Group Stage

Pos	Team	Pld	W	D	L	PF	PA	PD	Pts	Qualification
1	United States	9	9	0	0	190	54	+136	27	Round of 16
2	Belgium	9	7	0	2	136	75	+61	21	Round of 16
3	Thailand	9	6	0	3	96	102	−6	18	Round of 16
4	Czech Republic	9	6	0	3	140	106	+34	18	Round of 16
5	Chinese Taipei	9	5	0	4	124	114	+10	15	Round of 16
6	Romania	9	5	0	4	118	102	+16	15	Round of 16
7	Egypt	9	4	0	5	125	127	−2	12	Round of 16
8	Guam	9	2	0	7	77	151	−74	6	Round of 16
9	Andorra	9	1	0	8	76	161	−85	3	Eliminated
10	Indonesia	9	0	0	9	66	156	−90	0	Eliminated

18 August 2014
18:40

Belgium	22–7	Guam

Wutaishan Sports Center, Nanjing

19 August 2014
18:20

Belgium	22–1	Andorra

Wutaishan Sports Center, Nanjing

19 August 2014
20:40

Chinese Taipei	11–13	Belgium

Wutaishan Sports Center, Nanjing

20 August 2014
19:40

Belgium	16–6	Czech Republic

Wutaishan Sports Center, Nanjing

22 August 2014
17:40

United States	21–6	Belgium

Wutaishan Sports Center, Nanjing

22 August 2014
20:20

Belgium	12–10	Romania

Wutaishan Sports Center, Nanjing

23 August 2014
19:40

Indonesia	1–22	Belgium

Wutaishan Sports Center, Nanjing

24 August 2014
17:20

Belgium	16–10	Egypt

Wutaishan Sports Center, Nanjing

24 August 2014
21:40

Thailand	8–7	Belgium

Wutaishan Sports Center, Nanjing

Round of 16

25 August 2014
18:20

Brazil	16–20	Belgium

Wutaishan Sports Center, Nanjing

Quarterfinals

25 August 2014
20:30

Spain	16–14	Belgium

Wutaishan Sports Center, Nanjing

Knockout Stage

Round of 16	Quarterfinals	Semifinals	Final	Rank
Opposition Score	Opposition Score	Opposition Score	Opposition Score	Rank
Brazil; W 20-16	Spain; L 14–16	Did not advance		

== Cycling ==
Belgium qualified a boys' and girls' team based on its ranking issued by the UCI.

Team

Athletes	Event	Cross-Country Eliminator		Time Trial			BMX		Cross-Country Race			Road Race			Total Pts	Rank
Athletes	Event	Rank	Points	Time	Rank	Points	Rank	Points	Time	Rank	Points	Time	Rank	Points	Total Pts	Rank
Cedric Beullens; Gianni van Donink	Boys' Team	13	4	5:18.49	10	10	15	4	57:20	6	30	1:37:23; 1:37:47	9; 41	15	63	14
Femke van den Driessche; Laura Verdonschot	Girls' Team	7	25	6:16.20	16	1	14	6	48:44	10	10	1:22:07; 1:12:36	48; 7	25	67	20

Mixed Relay

Athletes	Event	Cross-Country Girls' Race	Cross-Country Boys' Race	Boys' Road Race	Girls' Road Race	Total Time	Rank
Femke van den Driessche; Gianni van Donink; Cedric Beullens; Laura Verdonschot	Mixed Team Relay	Did not start					

== Golf ==
Belgium qualified one team of two athletes based on the 8 June 2014 IGF Combined World Amateur Golf Rankings.

Individual

Athlete	Event	Round 1		Round 2			Round 3			Total	
Athlete	Event	Score	Rank	Score	Total	Rank	Score	Total	Rank	Score	Rank
Alan de Bondt	Boys	77	25	78	155	27	79	234	28	234	28
Clara Aveling	Girls	74	16	75	149	21	78	227	20	227	20

Team

Athletes	Event	Round 1 (Foursome)		Round 2 (Fourball)			Round 3 (Individual Stroke)				Total	
Athletes	Event	Score	Rank	Score	Total	Rank	Boy	Girl	Total	Rank	Score	Rank
Alan de Bondt; Clara Aveling	Mixed	69	17	71	140	15	71	76	147	17	287	14

== Gymnastics ==
=== Artistic Gymnastics ===
Belgium qualified one athlete based on its performance at the 2014 European MAG Championships

Boys

Athlete	Event	Apparatus						Total	Rank
Athlete	Event	F	PH	R	V	PB	HB	Total	Rank
Luka van den Keybus	Qualification	13.600	12.550	12.900	13.775	13.300	13.250	79.375	11
Luka van den Keybus	All-Around	13.350	12.400	12.700	13.650	13.600	13.450	79.150	9
Luka van den Keybus	Horizontal bar	—N/a					13.666	—N/a	2nd place, silver medalist(s)

== Judo ==
Belgium qualified two athletes based on its performance at the 2013 Cadet World Judo Championships.

Individual

Athlete	Event	Round of 16	Quarterfinals	Semifinals	Rep 1	Rep 2	Final / BM	Rank
Athlete	Event	Opposition Result	Opposition Result	Opposition Result	Opposition Result	Opposition Result	Opposition Result	Rank
Jorre Verstraeten	Boys' -55 kg	BYE	Jolly (AUS); W 100–000	Gurbanli (AZE); L 000–001	BYE		Mogopa (BOT); W 100–000	3rd place, bronze medalist(s)
Sophie Berger	Girls' -78 kg	BYE	Snyman (RSA); L 000–010	Did not advance	Pasternak (POL); L 000–100	Did not advance		9

Team

Athletes	Event	Round of 16	Quarterfinals	Semifinals	Final	Rank
Athletes	Event	Opposition Result	Opposition Result	Opposition Result	Opposition Result	Rank
Team Yamashita; Frank de Wit (NED); Nellie Einstein (SWE); Sandrine Mbazoghe Endamne (GAB); Lubjana Piovesana (GBR); Sara Rodriguez (ESP); Tsogtbaatar Tsend-Ochir (MGL); Jorre Verstraeten (BEL)	Mixed Team	Team Douillet; L 3(112) - 3(200)	Did not advance			9
Team Kerr; Sophie Berger (BEL); Karla Lorenzana (GUA); Saliou Ndiaye (SEN); Jennifer Schwille (GER); Oussama Snoussi (TUN); Pawel Wawrzyczek (POL); Bauyrzhan Zhauyntayev (KAZ)	Mixed Team	Team Berghmans; L 2-4	Did not advance			9

== Rowing ==
Belgium qualified one boat based on reallocation of unused quotas.

Athlete	Event	Heats		Repechage		Semifinals		Final	
Athlete	Event	Time	Rank	Time	Rank	Time	Rank	Time	Rank
Niels van Zandweghe	Boys' Single Sculls	3:44.53	4 R	3:32.25	2 SA/B	3:38.05	5 FB	3:36.45	11

Qualification Legend: FA=Final A (medal); FB=Final B (non-medal); FC=Final C (non-medal); FD=Final D (non-medal); SA/B=Semifinals A/B; SC/D=Semifinals C/D; R=Repechage

== Swimming ==
Belgium qualified four swimmers.

Boys

Athlete	Event	Heat		Semifinal		Final	
Athlete	Event	Time	Rank	Time	Rank	Time	Rank
Alexis Borisavljevic	50 m freestyle	23.81	22	Did not advance			
Alexis Borisavljevic	100 m freestyle	51.38	15 Q	51.54	16	Did not advance	
Alexis Borisavljevic	200 m freestyle	1:53.53	22	—N/a		Did not advance	
Basten Caerts	50 m breaststroke	29.16	18	Did not advance			
Basten Caerts	100 m breaststroke	1:03.82	18	Did not advance			
Basten Caerts	200 m breaststroke	2:17.64	13	—N/a		Did not advance	

Girls

Athlete	Event	Heat		Semifinal		Final	
Athlete	Event	Time	Rank	Time	Rank	Time	Rank
Edith Mattens	400 m freestyle	4:28.19	24	—N/a		Did not advance	
Edith Mattens	800 m freestyle	—N/a				9:01.57	18
Sara Vanleynseele	50 m butterfly	28.11	18	Did not advance			
Sara Vanleynseele	100 m butterfly	1:02.24	17 r	1:02.39	15	Did not advance	

Mixed

Athlete	Event	Heat		Final	
Athlete	Event	Time	Rank	Time	Rank
Alexis Borisavljevic; Basten Caerts; Edith Mattens; Sara Vanleynseele	4 × 100 m freestyle relay	Did not start		Did not advance	

== Table Tennis ==
Belgium qualified two athletes based on its performance at two Road to Nanjing series.

Singles

Athlete	Event	Group Stage	Rank	Round of 16	Quarterfinals	Semifinals	Final / BM	Rank
Athlete	Event	Opposition Score	Rank	Opposition Score	Opposition Score	Opposition Score	Opposition Score	Rank
Martin Allegro	Boys	Group B Muramatsu (JPN); L 0–3	3 qB	Bienatiki (CGO); W 3–1	Yin (SIN); L 2–3	Did not advance		21
Martin Allegro	Boys	Johnson (SKN); W 3–0	3 qB	Bienatiki (CGO); W 3–1	Yin (SIN); L 2–3	Did not advance		21
Martin Allegro	Boys	Ort (GER); L 1–3	3 qB	Bienatiki (CGO); W 3–1	Yin (SIN); L 2–3	Did not advance		21
Lisa Lung	Girls	Dong (NZL); W 3–1	2 Q	Zhang (USA); L 2–4	Did not advance			9
Lisa Lung	Girls	Kato (JPN); L 1–3	2 Q	Zhang (USA); L 2–4	Did not advance			9
Lisa Lung	Girls	Imre (HUN); W 3–0	2 Q	Zhang (USA); L 2–4	Did not advance			9

Team

Athletes	Event	Group Stage	Rank	Round of 16	Quarterfinals	Semifinals	Final / BM	Rank
Athletes	Event	Opposition Score	Rank	Opposition Score	Opposition Score	Opposition Score	Opposition Score	Rank
Belgium; Lisa Lung (BEL); Martin Allegro (BEL)	Mixed	Hung (HKG); Doo (HKG); L 0–3	2 Q	Chiu (TPE); Yang (TPE); L 0–2	Did not advance			9
Belgium; Lisa Lung (BEL); Martin Allegro (BEL)	Mixed	Dong (NZL); Johnson (SKN); W 3–0	2 Q	Chiu (TPE); Yang (TPE); L 0–2	Did not advance			9
Belgium; Lisa Lung (BEL); Martin Allegro (BEL)	Mixed	Imre (HUN); Szudi (HUN); W 2–1	2 Q	Chiu (TPE); Yang (TPE); L 0–2	Did not advance			9

Qualification Legend: Q=Main Bracket (medal); qB=Consolation Bracket (non-medal)

== Taekwondo ==
Belgium qualified four athletes based on its performance at the Taekwondo Qualification Tournament.

Boys

Athlete	Event	Round of 16	Quarterfinals	Semifinals	Final	Rank
Athlete	Event	Opposition Result	Opposition Result	Opposition Result	Opposition Result	Rank
Si Mohamed Ketbi	−55 kg	BYE	Arevalo (ECU); W 17 (PTG)–3	Joo (KOR); L 2–3	Did not advance	3rd place, bronze medalist(s)

Girls

Athlete	Event	Round of 16	Quarterfinals	Semifinals	Final	Rank
Athlete	Event	Opposition Result	Opposition Result	Opposition Result	Opposition Result	Rank
Indra Craen	−49 kg	BYE	Adamkiewicz (POL); W 14–9	Zhan (CHN); W 12 (SUD)–11	Huang (TPE); L 5–12	2nd place, silver medalist(s)
Laura Roebben	−55 kg	BYE	Martignani (ITA); W 8–7	Babić (CRO); L 4–13	Did not advance	3rd place, bronze medalist(s)
Amber Pannemans	−63 kg	BYE	Alizadeh Zenoorin (IRI); L 2–15(PTG)	Did not advance		5

== Tennis ==
Belgium qualified two athletes based on the 9 June 2014 ITF World Junior Rankings.

Singles

Athlete	Event	Round of 32	Round of 16	Quarterfinals	Semifinals	Final / BM	Rank
Athlete	Event	Opposition Score	Opposition Score	Opposition Score	Opposition Score	Opposition Score	Rank
Clément Geens	Boys' Singles	Serdarušić (CRO); W 6–3, 6–2	Chung (KOR); W 3–6, 6–0, 7–6	Luz (MEX); L 2–6, 4–6	Did not advance		5
Greetje Minnen	Girls' Singles	Buayam (THA); L 6–7, 1–6	Did not advance				33

Doubles

Athletes	Event	Round of 32	Round of 16	Quarterfinals	Semifinals	Final / BM	Rank
Athletes	Event	Opposition Score	Opposition Score	Opposition Score	Opposition Score	Opposition Score	Rank
Clément Geens (BEL); Andre Biro (HUN)	Boys' Doubles	—N/a	Appelgren (SWE); Čonkić (SRB); W 6–1, 6–7, [10–3]	Khachanov (RUS); Rublev (RUS); L 4–6, 4–6	Did not advance		5
Greetje Minnen (BEL); Ojasvinee Singh (IND)	Girls' Doubles	—N/a	Bains (AUS); Hon (AUS); L 2–6, 3–6	Did not advance			9
Greetje Minnen (BEL); Clément Geens (BEL)	Mixed Doubles	Paražinskaitė (LTU); Serdarušić (CRO); W 3–6, 6–3, [10–4]	Teichmann (SUI); Zieliński (POL); L 6–7, 3–6	Did not advance			9

== Triathlon ==
Belgium qualified two athletes based on its performance at the 2014 European Youth Olympic Games Qualifier.

Individual

Athlete	Event	Swim (750m)	Trans 1	Bike (20 km)	Trans 2	Run (5 km)	Total Time	Rank
Romain Loop	Boys	9:23	0:42	28:56	0:23	18:40	58:04	18
Amber Rombaut	Girls	10:35	0:45	31:15	0:27	19:44	1:02:46	11

Relay

Athlete	Event	Total Times per Athlete (Swim 250m, Bike 6.6 km, Run 1.8 km)	Total Group Time	Rank
Europe 4 Alberte Pedersen (DEN); Miguel Cassiano (POR); Amber Rombaut (BEL); Omri Bahat (ISR)	Mixed Relay	21:21; 18:50; 22:28; 20:15	1:23:54	4
Europe 5 Sara Skardelly (AUT); Romain Loop (BEL); Flora Bicsak (HUN); Dmitry Efimov (RUS)	Mixed Relay	22:33; 20:42; 23:20; 20:11	1:26:46	9
