= Gheorghe Ferariu =

Romanian volleyball player

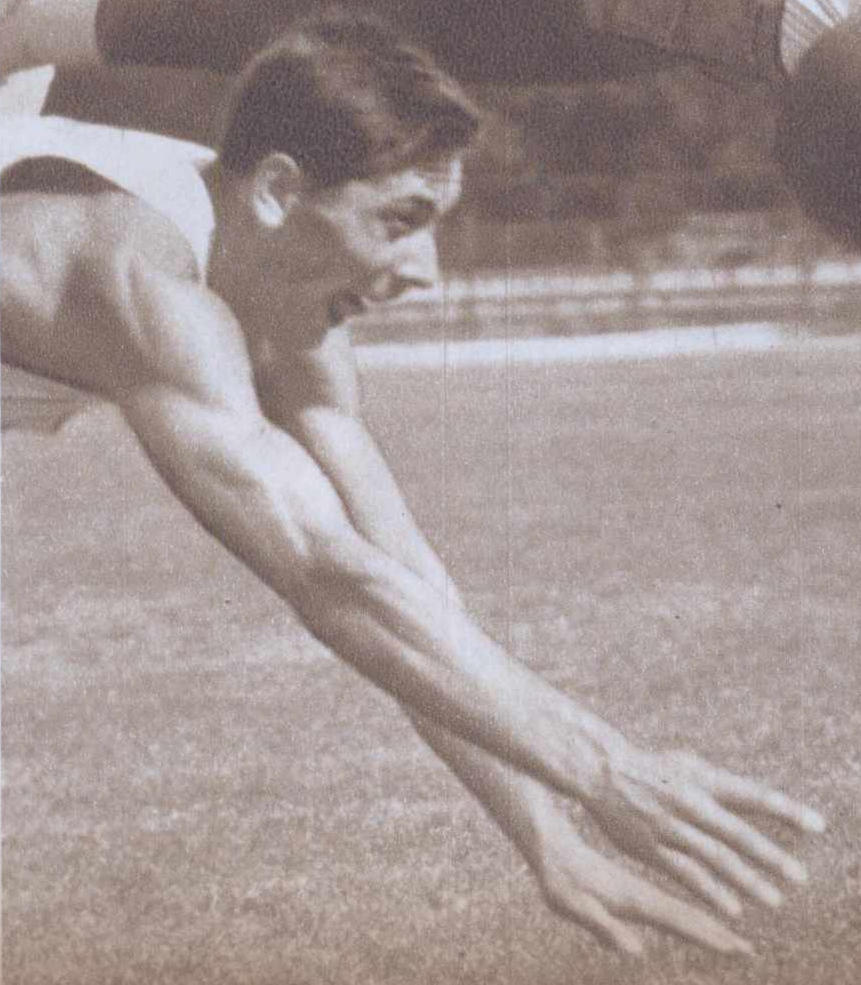
- Gheorghe Ferariu in 1963

Personal information
- Nationality: Romanian
- Born: 24 August 1936 (age 89) Brașov, Romania
- Occupation: Volleyball Player
- Spouse: Verginia "Juji" Jujescu

Sport
- Sport: Volleyball
- Position: Setter

Achievements and titles
- Personal best: 1962 Best Setter in the World 1963 Best Defender in Europe

Gheorghe Ferariu (born 24 August 1936) is a Romanian volleyball player. He is considered the best setter in the history of Romanian volleyball. In the 1960s, he reached the peak of his career and was considered the best setter in the world.

== Career ==
Ferariu, nicknamed Țîcǎ, had a prominent volleyball career, both nationally and internationally.

In 1962, he became the national champion with Rapid. The following year, in 1963, Ferariu was part of the Romanian national team that won the European Championship, held in Bucharest. During this tournament, he was recognized with the award for the best defender in Europe.

As a setter for the Romanian national team, Ferariu contributed to several major international victories. In 1957, 1959, and 1961, Romania secured first place at all three of the World University Games in Paris, Torino, and Sofia, respectively, with Țîcǎ playing a crucial role in all three competitions.

Ferariu competed in the men's tournament at the 1964 Summer Olympics, where Romania finished in 4th place.

Ferariu's international career also saw success at the World Championships, where Romania finished in third place in 1960 in Brazil, and again in third place in 1962 in Moscow. His individual performance in the 1962 World Championship earned him the award for the world's best setter.

In the latter stages of his career, from 1971 to 1973, Ferariu played in Italy for the volleyball team in Trieste. During his tenure, he helped the team avoid relegation from the top league and contributed to their notable achievement of securing fifth place in the Italian league.

Ferariu received the title of honorary master of sports and is recognized as an honorary citizen of Brașov.

== Personal life ==
Țîcǎ married Verginia "Juji" Jujescu in April 1962. They met in Cluj, where Juji was part of the "U" Cluj women's basketball team. In 1963, they had their first child, Corina Ferariu. In 1966, Horațiu George Ferariu was born. Following in his father's footsteps, Horațiu also pursued a career in volleyball, representing Romania at the national and international levels, thus continuing the legacy of his father's contributions to the sport.

Ferariu is the grandfather of basketball players Maria and Ana Ferariu.
