= Ana Ferariu =

Romanian basketball player

Personal information
- Born: 23 July 1997 (age 29) Brașov, Romania
- Listed height: 177 cm (5 ft 10 in)

Career information
- High school: Johannes Honterus (Brașov, Romania)
- College: Drexel (2016–2020)
- Playing career: 2012–2020
- Position: Guard

Career history
- 2012–2016: Olimpia CSU Brașov
- 2020: Olimpia CSU Brașov

Ana Ferariu (born 23 July 1997) is a Romanian former basketball player. She played in the Romanian Liga Națională with CSU Brașov and later college basketball for Drexel University. One of Romania's most promising players in her youth, she was a member its junior and senior national teams and once recorded a quadruple-double in an U16 game.

== Playing career ==
Ferariu started her career with Olimpia CSU Brașov in 2012 in the Liga Națională and played there until 2016 when she joined to the Drexel University where she played for the Drexel Dragons. On 19–20 December 2016, she was named the Rookie of the Week by the Colonial Athletic Association and the National Freshman of the Week by the United States Basketball Writers Association after scoring 18 points in just 13 minutes in a victory against Saint Joseph's.

== National team career ==
Ferariu was a member of the Romanian U16, U18, U20 and senior national teams. In August 2013, she recorded a quadruple-double in an U16 game against Ireland in the 2013 FIBA Europe Under-16 Championship for Women Division B. In the game she had 23 points, 12 rebounds, 10 assists and 10 steals. The only other basketball player to ever do a quadruple-double at this age (male or female) is Ricky Ricky Rubio.

In 2014, Ana participated at the Youth Olympics as a member of the Romanian 3x3 basketball team.

== Personal life ==
Her younger sister, Maria, also played basketball at Drexel University. Her grandfather Gheorghe Ferariu participated at the 1964 Summer Olympics and took 4th place with the Romanian volleyball team.

Ana holds a Master's degree in Statistics and is currently pursuing a PhD in Applied Sciences with a focus on Cognitive Behavior at Drexel University.

== Statistics ==
=== College statistics ===
Legend
| GP | Games played | GS | Games started | MPG | Minutes per game |
| FG% | Field goal percentage | 3P% | 3-point field goal percentage | FT% | Free throw percentage |
| RPG | Rebounds per game | APG | Assists per game | SPG | Steals per game |
| BPG | Blocks per game | PPG | Points per game | **Bold** | Career high |

| Year | Team | GP | Points | FG% | 3P% | FT% | RPG | APG | SPG | BPG | PPG |
|---|---|---|---|---|---|---|---|---|---|---|---|
| 2016-17 | Drexel | 27 | **133** | **47.4%** | **42.9%** | 75.6% | 1.7 | 0.8 | **0.8** | 0.2 | **4.9** |
| 2017-18 | Drexel | **34** | 100 | 39.6% | 15.0% | 58.6% | 1.8 | 0.9 | 0.5 | 0.1 | 2.9 |
| 2018-19 | Drexel | 33 | 96 | 37.6% | 0.0% | 70.0% | **2.3** | **1.3** | 0.5 | **0.2** | 2.9 |
| 2019-20 | Drexel | 26 | 44 | 39.5% | 16.7% | **81.8%** | 1.3 | 0.6 | 0.4 | 0.1 | 1.7 |
| Career | | 120 | 373 | 41.4% | 23.2% | 70.3% | 1.8 | 0.9 | 0.5 | 0.2 | 3.1 |
