= Wutaishan Sports Center =

Sports center in Nanjing, China

Coordinates: 32°3′3.73″N 118°46′7.08″E

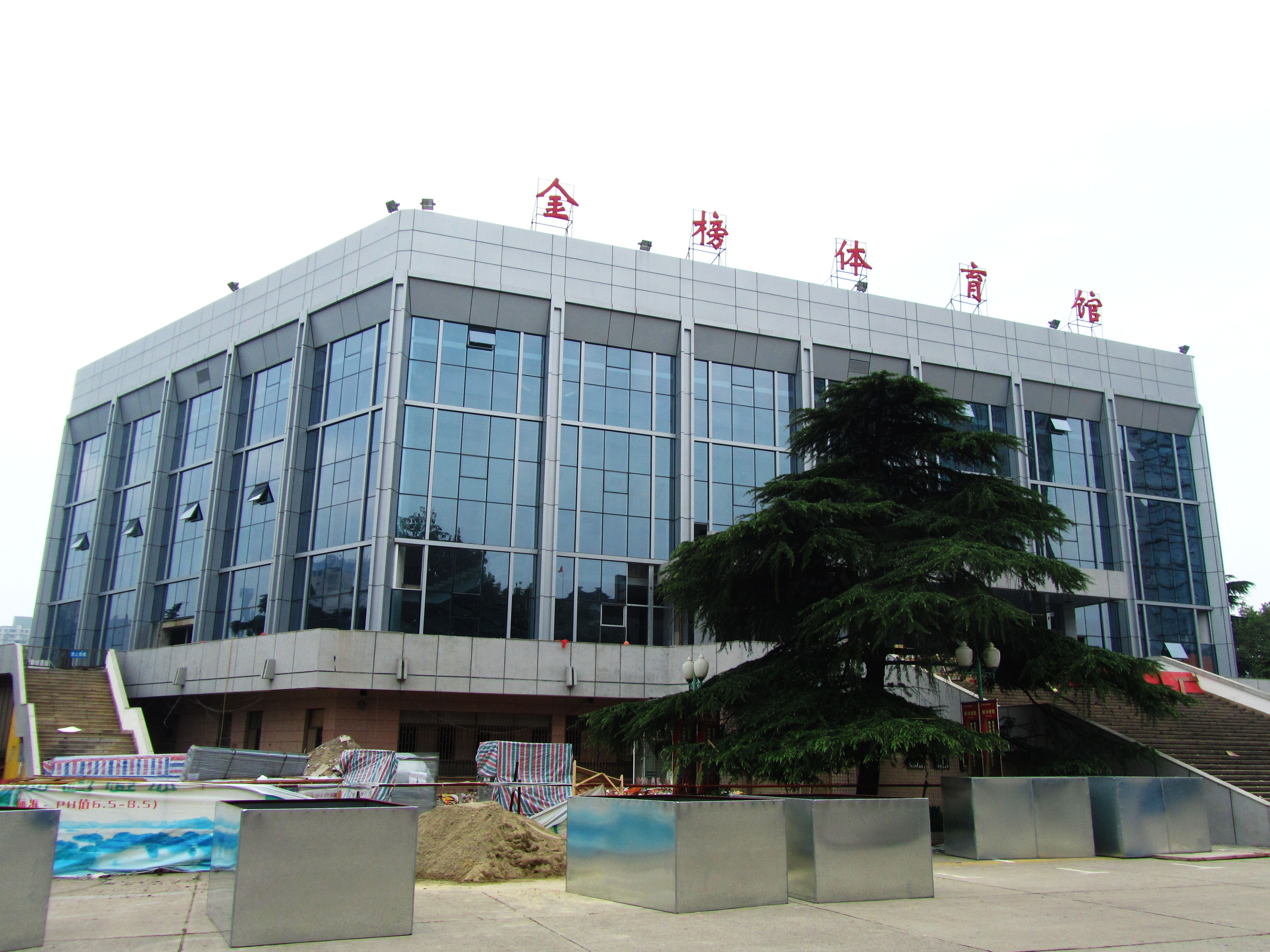
- Interactive map of Wutaishan Sports Center

Wutaishan Sports Center , named after the Mount Wutai, one of the most famed sacred mountain in Chinese Buddhism, is a sports center in Nanjing, China. It was established in 1952 and it was one of the oldest and most advanced stadiums in early time of People's Republic of China. It is home to the Wutaishan Stadium.

== See also ==
- Wutaishan Gymnasium
- Gulou District No.1 Center Primary School (Wutaishan Elementary School)
