= WTT Contender Istanbul 2026 =

Table tennis tournament in Turkey

Tournament details
- Dates: 10–15 November
- Edition: 2nd
- Total prize money: US$100,000
- Venue: Ata Sporları Merkezi
- Location: Istanbul, Turkey

Champions
- Men's singles: (Kazakhstan) Fang Bo
- Women's singles: (Japan) Honoka Hashimoto
- Men's doubles: (Russia) Nikita Artemenko (Russia) Maksim Grebnev
- Women's doubles: (Japan) Miyuu Kihara (Japan) Miu Hirano
- Mixed doubles: (England) Connor Green (Wales) Anna Hursey

The WTT Contender Istanbul 2026 was a table tennis tournament which took place at the Ata Sporları Merkezi, Istanbul, Turkey, from 10 to 15 November and had a total prize of US$100,000.

The previous edition of WTT Contender in Turkey was held in Antalya, back in 2023.

== Tournament ==
The WTT Contender Istanbul 2026 was the twenty-fourth tournament of the 2026 WTT Series and also part of the WTT Contender event.

=== Venue ===
This tournament was held at the Ata Sporları Merkezi in Istanbul, Turkey.

=== Point distribution ===
Below was the point distribution table for each phase of the tournament based on the WTT World Ranking for the WTT Contender event.

Event	Winner	Finalist	Semi-finalist	Quarter-finalist	Round of 16	Round of 32
Singles	400	280	180	120	30	4
Doubles	400	280	180	45	4	—

=== Prize pool ===
The total prize money was US$100,000 with the distribution of the prize money in accordance with WTT regulations.

Event	Winner	Finalist	Semi-finalist	Quarter-finalist	Round of 16	Round of 32
Singles	$5,000	$2,500	$1,275	$1,025	$825	$650
Doubles	$2,500	$1,500	$950	$550	$350	—

== Men's singles ==
=== Seeds ===
1. (Denmark) Anders Lind (withdrew)
2. (France) Thibault Poret (second round)
3. (Sweden) Elias Ranefur (quarter-finals)
4. (China) Chen Yuanyu (first round)
5. (China) Li Tianyang (quarter-finals)
6. (India) Manav Thakkar (second round)
7. (Czech Republic) Lubomír Jančařík (quarter-finals)
8. (England) Tom Jarvis (first round)

=== Finals ===
Semi-finals
Q	(Germany) Ricardo Walther	11	11	6	5	1
WC	(Kazakhstan) Fang Bo	6	8	11	11	11
Q	(South Korea) Kang Dong-soo	12	14	11	9	11
(Japan) Ryoichi Yoshiyama	10	16	4	11	8

Final
WC	(Kazakhstan) Fang Bo	11	8	11	11	11
Q	(South Korea) Kang Dong-soo	9	11	8	6	9

=== Top half ===
==== Section 1 ====
First round
(Germany) A Bertelsmeier	4	6	10
(China) Huang YZ	11	11	12
Q	(Germany) R Walther	4	12	11	9	11
(Brazil) G Teodoro	11	10	8	11	4
Q	(Turkey) T Yılmaz	9	13	8
Q	(Norway) B Haug	11	15	11
Q	(Turkey) I Gündüz	5	11	11	4	7
6	(India) M Thakkar	11	7	7	11	11

Second round
(China) Huang YZ	9	10	4
Q	(Germany) R Walther	11	12	11
Q	(Norway) B Haug	13	10	11	11	11
6	(India) M Thakkar	15	12	8	8	7

Quarter-finals
Q	(Germany) R Walther	11	13	6	11
Q	(Norway) B Haug	9	11	11	6

==== Section 2 ====
First round
4	(China) Chen YY	11	8	5	9
(China) Chen JS	6	11	11	11
WC	(Kazakhstan) Fang B	11	11	11
(Algeria) M Bouloussa	6	8	5
WC	(Germany) C Meissner	4	11	11	13	9
(Belgium) A Rassenfosse	11	7	4	15	11
(Romania) E Ionescu	11	4	11	8	3
7	(Czech Republic) L Jančařík	9	11	3	11	11

Second round
(China) Chen JS	9	3	9
WC	(Kazakhstan) Fang B	11	11	11
(Belgium) A Rassenfosse	11	9	10	8
7	(Czech Republic) L Jančařík	7	11	12	11

Quarter-finals
WC	(Kazakhstan) Fang B	11	11	11
7	(Czech Republic) L Jančařík	4	4	9

=== Bottom half ===
==== Section 3 ====
First round
8	(England) T Jarvis	10	11	11	10	8
(Russia) N Artemenko	12	9	7	12	11
(Japan) Y Tanaka	6	5	13	8
Q	(South Korea) Kang D-s	11	11	11	11
Q	(Australia) A Sareen	11	11	5	7	11
(Russia) E Tikhonov	4	9	11	11	9
Q	(Brazil) L Iizuka	10	12	11	8	13
3	(Sweden) E Ranefur	12	10	6	11	15

Second round
(Russia) N Artemenko	9	9	11	11	4
Q	(South Korea) Kang D-s	11	11	9	9	11
Q	(Australia) A Sareen	9	2	15	11	7
3	(Sweden) E Ranefur	11	11	13	7	11

Quarter-finals
Q	(South Korea) Kang D-s	14	12	13
3	(Sweden) E Ranefur	12	10	11

==== Section 4 ====
First round
5	(China) Li TY	8	11	11	11
Q	(Japan) J Yokotani	11	8	9	7
Q	(Russia) M Grebnev	11	7	9	9
WC	(Turkey) A Yigenler	7	11	11	11
(France) J Seyfried	7	6	8
(Japan) R Yoshiyama	11	11	11
Q	(China) Yuan LC	11	7	8	10
2	(France) T Poret	7	11	11	12

Second round
5	(China) Li TY	7	11	11	10	11
WC	(Turkey) A Yigenler	11	8	4	12	6
(Japan) R Yoshiyama	12	11	12	11
2	(France) T Poret	10	9	14	9

Quarter-finals
5	(China) Li TY	14	11	9	7	6
(Japan) R Yoshiyama	12	8	11	11	11

== Women's singles ==
=== Seeds ===
1. (Japan) Honoka Hashimoto (champion)
2. (South Korea) Joo Cheon-hui (final)
3. (Japan) Miyu Nagasaki (second round)
4. (Japan) Miyuu Kihara (first round)
5. (Romania) Bernadette Szőcs (quarter-finals)
6. (China) Qin Yuxuan (second round)
7. (Japan) Miu Hirano (semi-finals)
8. (Brazil) Bruna Takahashi (quarter-finals)

=== Finals ===
Semi-finals
1	(Japan) Honoka Hashimoto	11	11	9	15
7	(Japan) Miu Hirano	8	4	11	13
(Japan) Kaho Akae	6	14	10
2	(South Korea) Joo Cheon-hui	11	16	12

Final
1	(Japan) Honoka Hashimoto	11	11	7	11	11
2	(South Korea) Joo Cheon-hui	9	9	11	3	1

=== Top half ===
==== Section 1 ====
First round
1	(Japan) H Hashimoto	11	11	11
Q	(Spain) S-X Zhang	5	2	6
WC	(Chinese Taipei) Yeh Y-t	6	2	11	9
WC	(Wales) A Hursey	11	11	7	11
Q	(Ukraine) V Matiunina	12	10	11	8	11
(France) J N Yuan	10	12	6	11	8
(South Korea) Kim N-y	5	9	11	7
8	(Brazil) B Takahashi	11	11	9	11

Second round
1	(Japan) H Hashimoto	11	9	11	11
WC	(Wales) A Hursey	4	11	5	3
Q	(Ukraine) V Matiunina	6	8	6
8	(Brazil) B Takahashi	11	11	11

Quarter-finals
1	(Japan) H Hashimoto	11	11	11
8	(Brazil) B Takahashi	3	4	6

==== Section 2 ====
First round
3	(Japan) M Nagasaki	11	11	11
Q	(China) Wei JM	6	6	8
Q	(China) Fan SH	11	6	10	11	7
(China) Zong GM	8	11	12	7	11
(Croatia) H Arapović	11	11	5	11	11
(France) P Pavade	13	8	11	9	7
(Russia) V Voronina	6	11	7	10
7	(Japan) M Hirano	11	4	11	12

Second round
3	(Japan) M Nagasaki	9	12	8	8
(China) Zong GM	11	10	11	11
(Croatia) H Arapović	11	5	11	7	5
7	(Japan) M Hirano	8	11	5	11	11

Quarter-finals
(China) Zong GM	11	3	8	11	8
7	(Japan) M Hirano	6	11	11	7	11

=== Bottom half ===
==== Section 3 ====
First round
6	(China) Qin YX	11	11	11
(United States) S Moyland	8	7	7
(Japan) S Shibata	11	11	11
(Romania) A Dragoman	4	5	8
Q	(France) A Zarif	9	4	5
WC	(Turkey) E Haraç	11	11	11
(Japan) K Akae	11	11	11
4	(Japan) M Kihara	9	9	5

Second round
6	(China) Qin YX	8	11	5	3
(Japan) S Shibata	11	5	11	11
WC	(Turkey) E Haraç	5	4	4
(Japan) K Akae	11	11	11

Quarter-finals
(Japan) S Shibata	10	8	9
(Japan) K Akae	12	11	11

==== Section 4 ====
First round
5	(Romania) B Szőcs	7	13	11	11
(Romania) E Samara	11	11	6	5
(Thailand) O Paranang	13	11	7	11	9
Q	(China) Wang XT	11	13	11	9	11
Q	(Japan) C Muramatsu	11	11	6	10	8
(Austria) S Polcanova	9	7	11	12	11
Q	(Iran) E Rahimi	6	11	9	8
2	(South Korea) Joo C-h	11	6	11	11

Second round
5	(Romania) B Szőcs	9	6	11	11	13
Q	(China) Wang XT	11	11	9	5	11
(Austria) S Polcanova	3	9	11
2	(South Korea) Joo C-h	11	11	13

Quarter-finals
5	(Romania) B Szőcs	7	9	5
2	(South Korea) Joo C-h	11	11	11

== Men's doubles ==
=== Seeds ===
1. (Russia) Nikita Artemenko / (Russia) Maksim Grebnev (champions)
2. (Brazil) Leonardo Iizuka / (Brazil) Guilherme Teodoro (quarter-finals)
3. (Turkey) Ibrahim Gündüz / (Turkey) Abdullah Yigenler (first round)
4. (Russia) Evgeny Tikhonov / (Russia) Dmitrii Vinogradov (quarter-finals)

=== Finals ===
Semi-finals
1	(Russia) Nikita Artemenko (Russia) Maksim Grebnev	11	11	11
WC	(Bulgaria) Petyo Krastev (Bulgaria) Yoan Velichkov	8	9	4
Q	(Luxembourg) Luka Mladenovic (Luxembourg) Maël Van Dessel	13	11	11
Q	(South Korea) Kang Dong-soo (South Korea) Lim Yun-oh	11	6	7

Final
1	(Russia) Nikita Artemenko (Russia) Maksim Grebnev	11	11	8	11
Q	(Luxembourg) Luka Mladenovic (Luxembourg) Maël Van Dessel	6	9	11	9

=== Top half ===
First round
1	(Russia) N Artemenko (Russia) M Grebnev	11	11	11	11
(Norway) B Haug (United States) N Naresh	8	13	9	8
(Spain) M Pantoja (Spain) N Tauler	11	6	10	7
Q	(Kazakhstan) I Kharki (Kazakhstan) Fang B	7	11	12	11
3	(Turkey) I Gündüz (Turkey) A Yigenler	12	10	12	8	9
WC	(Bulgaria) P Krastev (Bulgaria) Y Velichkov	10	12	10	11	11
(England) T Jarvis (England) C Green	10	8	8
Q	(Italy) D Faso (Turkey) G Öçal	12	11	11

Quarter-finals
1	(Russia) N Artemenko (Russia) M Grebnev	11	11	10	11
Q	(Kazakhstan) I Kharki (Kazakhstan) Fang B	9	5	12	8
WC	(Bulgaria) P Krastev (Bulgaria) Y Velichkov	11	11	7	11
Q	(Italy) D Faso (Turkey) G Öçal	5	9	11	8

Semi-finals
1	(Russia) N Artemenko (Russia) M Grebnev	11	11	11
WC	(Bulgaria) P Krastev (Bulgaria) Y Velichkov	8	9	4

=== Bottom half ===
First round
(Japan) R Yoshiyama (Japan) K Yoshiyama	11	11	8	8	3
Q	(Luxembourg) L Mladenovic (Luxembourg) M Van Dessel	8	2	11	11	11
Q	(Uzbekistan) M Toliev (Uzbekistan) S Gulomiddinov	3	8	4
4	(Russia) E Tikhonov (Russia) D Vinogradov	11	11	11
Q	(South Korea) Kang D-s (South Korea) Lim Y-o	11	11	13
(Spain) R De Las Heras (Spain) D Lillo	4	6	11
(China) Huang YZ (China) Chen YY	11	11	8	11	2
2	(Brazil) L Iizuka (Brazil) G Teodoro	7	13	11	6	11

Quarter-finals
Q	(Luxembourg) L Mladenovic (Luxembourg) M Van Dessel	11	11	11
4	(Russia) E Tikhonov (Russia) D Vinogradov	9	7	9
Q	(South Korea) Kang D-s (South Korea) Lim Y-o	7	11	11	12	12
2	(Brazil) L Iizuka (Brazil) G Teodoro	11	9	6	14	10

Semi-finals
Q	(Luxembourg) L Mladenovic (Luxembourg) M Van Dessel	13	11	11
Q	(South Korea) Kang D-s (South Korea) Lim Y-o	11	6	7

== Women's doubles ==
=== Seeds ===
1. (South Korea) Kim Na-yeong / (South Korea) Joo Cheon-hui (semi-finals)
2. (Romania) Elizabeta Samara / (Romania) Bernadette Szőcs (quarter-finals)
3. (Japan) Miyuu Kihara / (Japan) Miu Hirano (champions)
4. (Japan) Honoka Hashimoto / (Japan) Miyu Nagasaki (final)

=== Finals ===
Semi-finals
1	(South Korea) Kim Na-yeong (South Korea) Joo Cheon-hui	6	9	11	3
4	(Japan) Honoka Hashimoto (Japan) Miyu Nagasaki	11	11	4	11
3	(Japan) Miyuu Kihara (Japan) Miu Hirano	11	12	11	11
Q	(France) Jia Nan Yuan (France) Prithika Pavade	4	14	9	7

Final
4	(Japan) Honoka Hashimoto (Japan) Miyu Nagasaki	2	8	8
3	(Japan) Miyuu Kihara (Japan) Miu Hirano	11	11	11

=== Top half ===
First round
1	(South Korea) Kim N-y (South Korea) Joo C-h	13	7	11	11	11
WC	(Turkey) E Haraç (Turkey) S Altınkaya	15	11	9	8	4
Q	(United States) S Moyland (United States) J Reyes Lai	10	11	8	14	8
(Russia) M Tailakova (Russia) E Zironova	12	9	11	12	11
4	(Japan) H Hashimoto (Japan) M Nagasaki	9	11	11	8	11
(Russia) V Voronina (Russia) M Panfilova	11	7	9	11	8
(China) Qin YX (China) Zong GM	12	7	11	11
(Chile) V Ríos (Guatemala) L Cordero	10	11	8	6

Quarter-finals
1	(South Korea) Kim N-y (South Korea) Joo C-h	11	6	9	11	11
(Russia) M Tailakova (Russia) E Zironova	5	11	11	5	8
4	(Japan) H Hashimoto (Japan) M Nagasaki	8	11	11	11
(China) Qin YX (China) Zong GM	11	7	5	8

Semi-finals
1	(South Korea) Kim N-y (South Korea) Joo C-h	6	9	11	3
4	(Japan) H Hashimoto (Japan) M Nagasaki	11	11	4	11

=== Bottom half ===
First round
Q	(Brazil) G Takahashi (Brazil) L Watanabe	12	6	11	6	7
(Germany) Y Wan (Thailand) O Paranang	10	11	8	11	11
(Japan) S Shibata (Japan) C Muramatsu	5	9	8
3	(Japan) M Kihara (Japan) M Hirano	11	11	11
WC	(India) S Ghosh (Kazakhstan) S Mirkadirova	7	8	10
Q	(France) J N Yuan (France) P Pavade	11	11	12
Q	(France) E Pujol (France) C De Stoppeleire	6	8	6
2	(Romania) E Samara (Romania) B Szőcs	11	11	11

Quarter-finals
(Germany) Y Wan (Thailand) O Paranang	11	5	9	8
3	(Japan) M Kihara (Japan) M Hirano	4	11	11	11
Q	(France) J N Yuan (France) P Pavade	11	11	12
2	(Romania) E Samara (Romania) B Szőcs	7	3	10

Semi-finals
3	(Japan) M Kihara (Japan) M Hirano	11	12	11	11
Q	(France) J N Yuan (France) P Pavade	4	14	9	7

== Mixed doubles ==
=== Seeds ===
1. (Romania) Eduard Ionescu / (Romania) Bernadette Szőcs (first round)
2. (United States) Jishan Liang / (United States) Sally Moyland (first round)
3. (England) Connor Green / (Wales) Anna Hursey (champions)
4. (Russia) Evgeny Tikhonov / (Russia) Maria Panfilova (final)

=== Finals ===
Semi-finals
(China) Huang Youzheng (China) Qin Yuxuan	3	11	8	11	9
4	(Russia) Evgeny Tikhonov (Russia) Maria Panfilova	11	7	11	9	11
3/WC	(England) Connor Green (Wales) Anna Hursey	7	13	11	15	11
Q	(South Korea) Lim Yun-oh (South Korea) Joo Cheon-hui	11	11	3	17	5

Final
4	(Russia) Evgeny Tikhonov (Russia) Maria Panfilova	7	10	9
3/WC	(England) Connor Green (Wales) Anna Hursey	11	12	11

=== Top half ===
First round
1	(Romania) E Ionescu (Romania) B Szőcs	4	6	12
(China) Huang YZ (China) Qin YX	11	11	14
(Russia) N Artemenko (Russia) M Tailakova	11	11	3	11
Q	(China) Yuan LC (China) Zong GM	9	6	11	7
4	(Russia) E Tikhonov (Russia) M Panfilova	11	11	11
(Australia) A Sareen (Australia) J Wu	7	9	9
(United States) N Naresh (United States) J Reyes Lai	8	2	3
(Turkey) A Yigenler (Turkey) E Haraç	11	11	11

Quarter-finals
(China) Huang YZ (China) Qin YX	11	8	11	11
(Russia) N Artemenko (Russia) M Tailakova	7	11	6	9
4	(Russia) E Tikhonov (Russia) M Panfilova	11	11	11
(Turkey) A Yigenler (Turkey) E Haraç	7	6	4

Semi-finals
(China) Huang YZ (China) Qin YX	3	11	8	11	9
4	(Russia) E Tikhonov (Russia) M Panfilova	11	7	11	9	11

=== Bottom half ===
First round
(Brazil) G Teodoro (Brazil) G Takahashi	11	7	11	11
(Kazakhstan) I Kharki (Kazakhstan) S Mirkadirova	7	11	9	6
Q	(Brazil) L Iizuka (Brazil) L Watanabe	8	5	8
3/WC	(England) C Green (Wales) A Hursey	11	11	11
Q	(Kazakhstan) Fang B (Austria) S Polcanova	7	4	11	8
WC	(Russia) M Grebnev (Russia) V Voronina	11	11	9	11
Q	(South Korea) Lim Y-o (South Korea) Joo C-h	11	7	12	7	11
2	(United States) J Liang (United States) S Moyland	2	11	10	11	6

Quarter-finals
(Brazil) G Teodoro (Brazil) G Takahashi	11	11	2	9	3
3/WC	(England) C Green (Wales) A Hursey	6	7	11	11	11
WC	(Russia) M Grebnev (Russia) V Voronina	5	11	11	11	4
Q	(South Korea) Lim Y-o (South Korea) Joo C-h	11	13	6	9	11

Semi-finals
3/WC	(England) C Green (Wales) A Hursey	7	13	11	15	11
Q	(South Korea) Lim Y-o (South Korea) Joo C-h	11	11	3	17	5

Preceded by WTT Champions Frankfurt 2026	2026 WTT Series	Succeeded by WTT Star Contender Muscat 2026
