= United States Smash 2026 – Qualification =

Series of table tennis matches in California

The United States Smash 2026 – Qualification was a series of table tennis matches that took place on 26 and 27 June 2026 to determine the eight qualifiers for the tournament's main draw.

The qualification tournament was contested in two singles events: men's singles and women's singles.

A total of 48 players competed in each event in a knockout format, with only eight players from each event securing a place in the main draw.

== Qualifiers ==
=== Men's singles qualifiers ===
The following players qualified for the main draw:

- (Sweden) Elias Ranefur
- (Hong Kong) Baldwin Chan
- (Hungary) Csaba András
- (Germany) André Bertelsmeier
- (Romania) Iulian Chirita
- (Moldova) Vladislav Ursu
- (Chinese Taipei) Kao Cheng-jui
- (Argentina) Horacio Cifuentes

=== Women's singles qualifiers ===
The following players qualified for the main draw:

- (France) Audrey Zarif
- (Germany) Xiaona Shan
- (India) Yashaswini Ghorpade
- (Romania) Elena Zaharia
- (Singapore) Tan Zhao Yun
- (Chinese Taipei) Huang Yu-jie
- (Chinese Taipei) Peng Yu-han
- (Portugal) Jieni Shao

== Men's singles ==
=== Seeds ===
1. (South Korea) Lim Jong-hoon (qualifying competition)
2. (India) Manush Shah (second round)
3. (Chinese Taipei) Feng Yi-hsin (qualifying competition)
4. (South Korea) Park Gyu-hyeon (second round)
5. (China) Huang Youzheng (qualifying competition)
6. (Chinese Taipei) Kao Cheng-jui (qualified)
7. (Croatia) Andrej Gaćina (qualifying competition)
8. (Spain) Álvaro Robles (second round)
9. (Hong Kong) Baldwin Chan (qualified)
10. (Germany) André Bertelsmeier (qualified)
11. (Germany) Ricardo Walther (second round)
12. (Algeria) Mehdi Bouloussa (second round)
13. (Hungary) Csaba András (qualified)
14. (Sweden) Elias Ranefur (qualified)
15. (Moldova) Vladislav Ursu (qualified)
16. (Portugal) Marcos Freitas (qualifying competition)

=== First qualifier ===
First round
(Chinese Taipei) Liao Cheng-ting	11	14	12	3	11
(Australia) Aditya Sareen	13	12	10	11	6
(Chile) Nicolás Burgos	11	11	11
(Chile) Gustavo Gomez	8	7	10

Second round
1	(South Korea) Lim Jong-hoon	14	11	12	11
(Chinese Taipei) Liao Cheng-ting	12	13	10	7
(Chile) Nicolás Burgos	4	4	6
14	(Sweden) Elias Ranefur	11	11	11

Qualifying competition
1	(South Korea) Lim Jong-hoon	6	4	11	7
14	(Sweden) Elias Ranefur	11	11	8	11

=== Second qualifier ===
First round
(India) Akash Pal	12	5	8	5
(Canada) Eugene Wang	10	11	11	11
(Luxembourg) Luka Mladenovic	18	6	8	6
(Italy) John Oyebode	16	11	11	11

Second round
9	(Hong Kong) Baldwin Chan	17	11	11	11
(Canada) Eugene Wang	15	8	13	6
(Italy) John Oyebode	5	10	9
5	(China) Huang Youzheng	11	12	11

Qualifying competition
9	(Hong Kong) Baldwin Chan	17	11	13
5	(China) Huang Youzheng	15	8	11

=== Third qualifier ===
First round
(Australia) Hwan Bae	8	8	7
(Brazil) Guilherme Teodoro	11	11	11
WC	(United States) Alex Luo	1	4	7
(Portugal) Tiago Apolónia	11	11	11

Second round
3	(Chinese Taipei) Feng Yi-hsin	13	8	11	11
(Brazil) Guilherme Teodoro	11	11	7	8
(Portugal) Tiago Apolónia	12	4	10	7
13	(Hungary) Csaba András	10	11	12	11

Qualifying competition
3	(Chinese Taipei) Feng Yi-hsin	9	7	11	11	7
13	(Hungary) Csaba András	11	11	1	9	11

=== Fourth qualifier ===
First round
(Sweden) Mattias Karlsson	12	11	7	11	11
(Slovakia) Ľubomír Pištej	14	8	11	4	7
WC	(United States) Nikhil Kumar	9	11	14	13
(Hong Kong) Lam Siu Hang	11	7	12	11

Second round
10	(Germany) André Bertelsmeier	8	12	11	9	11
(Sweden) Mattias Karlsson	11	10	8	11	7
WC	(United States) Nikhil Kumar	11	9	5	10
7	(Croatia) Andrej Gaćina	9	11	11	12

Qualifying competition
10	(Germany) André Bertelsmeier	11	11	14
7	(Croatia) Andrej Gaćina	9	7	12

=== Fifth qualifier ===
First round
(Belgium) Cédric Nuytinck	7	6	11	11	4
(Romania) Iulian Chirita	11	11	6	9	11
(Singapore) Izaac Quek	6	9	6
(Slovenia) Deni Kožul	11	11	11

Second round
8	(Spain) Álvaro Robles	10	12	12	11	7
(Romania) Iulian Chirita	12	10	14	8	11
(Slovenia) Deni Kožul	11	5	11	14
12	(Algeria) Mehdi Bouloussa	7	11	5	12

Qualifying competition
(Romania) Iulian Chirita	7	11	5	11	11
(Slovenia) Deni Kožul	11	6	11	5	8

=== Sixth qualifier ===
First round
WC	(Romania) Ovidiu Ionescu	11	9	11	11
WC	(United States) Sid Naresh	4	11	5	8
WC	(Mexico) Rogelio Castro	11	8	11	9
(Belgium) Martin Allegro	13	11	8	11

Second round
15	(Moldova) Vladislav Ursu	11	12	9	4	11
WC	(Romania) Ovidiu Ionescu	5	10	11	11	9
(Belgium) Martin Allegro	5	11	9	13	11
4	(South Korea) Park Gyu-hyeon	11	9	11	11	8

Qualifying competition
15	(Moldova) Vladislav Ursu	11	11	11
(Belgium) Martin Allegro	5	8	8

=== Seventh qualifier ===
First round
(Brazil) Leonardo Iizuka	11	11	16
(Benin) Abdel-Kader Salifou	8	9	14
(India) Snehit Suravajjula	7	9	7
(China) Xue Fei	11	11	11

Second round
6	(Chinese Taipei) Kao Cheng-jui	11	11	5	11
(Brazil) Leonardo Iizuka	8	6	11	9
(China) Xue Fei	8	11	9	11	11
11	(Germany) Ricardo Walther	11	9	11	6	6

Qualifying competition
6	(Chinese Taipei) Kao Cheng-jui	9	11	12	13	11
(China) Xue Fei	11	4	10	15	7

=== Eighth qualifier ===
First round
(Chinese Taipei) Chang Yu-an	8	11	11	7	11
(Cameroon) Ylane Batix	11	7	7	11	3
(Argentina) Horacio Cifuentes	11	8	11	11
(Canada) Edward Ly	7	11	4	9

Second round
16	(Portugal) Marcos Freitas	7	9	11	12	11
(Chinese Taipei) Chang Yu-an	11	11	9	10	6
(Argentina) Horacio Cifuentes	13	11	11
2	(India) Manush Shah	11	7	6

Qualifying competition
16	(Portugal) Marcos Freitas	6	7	12	5
(Argentina) Horacio Cifuentes	11	11	10	11

== Women's singles ==
=== Seeds ===
1. (Australia) Jee Minhyung (second round)
2. (Portugal) Jieni Shao (qualified)
3. (India) Yashaswini Ghorpade (qualified)
4. (Chinese Taipei) Huang Yu-jie (qualified)
5. (Chinese Taipei) Chien Tung-chuan (qualifying competition)
6. (Monaco) Xiaoxin Yang (qualifying competition)
7. (Hong Kong) Ng Wing Lam (qualifying competition)
8. (India) Diya Chitale (second round)
9. (Chinese Taipei) Peng Yu-han (qualified)
10. (India) Ayhika Mukherjee (second round)
11. (Italy) Gaia Monfardini (second round)
12. (Germany) Xiaona Shan (qualified)
13. (Singapore) Ser Lin Qian (qualifying competition)
14. (England) Tin-Tin Ho (qualifying competition)
15. (Italy) Giorgia Piccolin (qualifying competition)
16. (Luxembourg) Sarah de Nutte (qualifying competition)

=== First qualifier ===
First round
(Brazil) Laura Watanabe	9	9	4
(France) Audrey Zarif	11	11	11
(France) Camille Lutz	11	11	11
WC	(United States) Mandy Yu	1	8	3

Second round
1	(Australia) Jee Minhyung	3	11	9	7
(France) Audrey Zarif	11	8	11	11
(France) Camille Lutz	12	11	11	8
16	(Luxembourg) Sarah de Nutte	14	7	13	11

Qualifying competition
(France) Audrey Zarif	8	12	11	6	11
16	(Luxembourg) Sarah de Nutte	11	10	7	11	7

=== Second qualifier ===
First round
(Spain) Sofia-Xuan Zhang	11	11	11
(Puerto Rico) Brianna Burgos	9	6	9
(Italy) Nicole Arlia	10	10	10
(Serbia) Izabela Lupulesku	12	12	12

Second round
12	(Germany) Xiaona Shan	6	13	12	11
(Spain) Sofia-Xuan Zhang	11	11	10	8
(Serbia) Izabela Lupulesku	9	8	8
7	(Hong Kong) Ng Wing Lam	11	11	11

Qualifying competition
12	(Germany) Xiaona Shan	11	11	8	13
7	(Hong Kong) Ng Wing Lam	8	6	11	11

=== Third qualifier ===
First round
(Serbia) Sabina Šurjan	9	11	11	11
(Germany) Yuan Wan	11	9	4	7
WC	(United States) Tashiya Piyadasa	5	3	11	11	9
(India) Sutirtha Mukherjee	11	11	6	2	11

Second round
3	(India) Yashaswini Ghorpade	11	11	9	11
(Serbia) Sabina Šurjan	6	6	11	8
(India) Sutirtha Mukherjee	5	5	11	11	4
15	(Italy) Giorgia Piccolin	11	11	7	9	11

Qualifying competition
3	(India) Yashaswini Ghorpade	9	11	11	11
15	(Italy) Giorgia Piccolin	11	4	3	9

=== Fourth qualifier ===
First round
WC	(Germany) Josephina Neumann	3	8	4
(Romania) Elena Zaharia	11	11	11
(Chile) Daniela Ortega	11	11	7	5	11
WC	(United States) Satya Aspathi	6	8	11	11	6

Second round
11	(Italy) Gaia Monfardini	9	11	11	7	7
(Romania) Elena Zaharia	11	9	9	11	11
(Chile) Daniela Ortega	11	8	5	6
6	(Monaco) Xiaoxin Yang	8	11	11	11

Qualifying competition
(Romania) Elena Zaharia	11	11	11
6	(Monaco) Xiaoxin Yang	3	4	6

=== Fifth qualifier ===
First round
(Kazakhstan) Zauresh Akasheva	11	3	5	13	11
(Sweden) Christina Källberg	9	11	11	11	3
(Australia) Jiamuwa Wu	5	4	5
(Singapore) Tan Zhao Yun	11	11	11

Second round
8	(India) Diya Chitale	11	11	10	6	9
(Kazakhstan) Zauresh Akasheva	9	5	12	11	11
(Singapore) Tan Zhao Yun	12	13	11	11
10	(India) Ayhika Mukherjee	10	11	13	2

Qualifying competition
(Kazakhstan) Zauresh Akasheva	11	7	9	7
(Singapore) Tan Zhao Yun	9	11	11	11

=== Sixth qualifier ===
First round
(Brazil) Giulia Takahashi	7	10	5
(Turkey) Sibel Altınkaya	11	12	11
(Slovakia) Tatiana Kukuľková	11	5	13	12
(Romania) Adina Diaconu	7	11	11	10

Second round
13	(Singapore) Ser Lin Qian	11	11	4	11
(Turkey) Sibel Altınkaya	8	7	11	8
(Slovakia) Tatiana Kukuľková	9	5	4
4	(Chinese Taipei) Huang Yu-jie	11	11	11

Qualifying competition
13	(Singapore) Ser Lin Qian	6	7	11	5
4	(Chinese Taipei) Huang Yu-jie	11	11	9	11

=== Seventh qualifier ===
First round
(Poland) Katarzyna Węgrzyn	11	11	11	11
(Chile) Paulina Vega	9	13	7	6
(Croatia) Hana Arapović	7	11	7	9
(Sweden) Filippa Bergand	11	5	11	11

Second round
5	(Chinese Taipei) Chien Tung-chuan	11	8	11	11
(Poland) Katarzyna Węgrzyn	6	11	9	8
(Sweden) Filippa Bergand	11	14	6	11	9
9	(Chinese Taipei) Peng Yu-han	13	12	11	9	11

Qualifying competition
5	(Chinese Taipei) Chien Tung-chuan	11	12	9	10	6
9	(Chinese Taipei) Peng Yu-han	7	10	11	12	11

=== Eighth qualifier ===
First round
WC	(United States) Ke Wang	9	6	6
(Slovakia) Barbora Várady	11	11	11
(Australia) Constantina Psihogios	11	11	11
WC	(United States) Hildy Chen	7	7	5

Second round
14	(England) Tin-Tin Ho	11	11	12
(Slovakia) Barbora Várady	6	8	10
(Australia) Constantina Psihogios	9	5	4
2	(Portugal) Jieni Shao	11	11	11

Qualifying competition
14	(England) Tin-Tin Ho	14	12	6	7
2	(Portugal) Jieni Shao	16	10	11	11
