= WTT Star Contender São José dos Campos 2026 =

Table tennis tournament in Brazil

Tournament details
- Dates: 21–26 July
- Edition: 2nd
- Total prize money: US$300,000
- Venue: Vale Sul Shopping
- Location: São José dos Campos, Brazil

Champions
- Men's singles: (Brazil) Hugo Calderano
- Women's singles: (Japan) Hina Hayata
- Men's doubles: (Hong Kong) Wong Chun Ting (Hong Kong) Baldwin Chan
- Women's doubles: (Japan) Hina Hayata (Japan) Kaho Akae
- Mixed doubles: (Japan) Shunsuke Togami (Japan) Satsuki Odo

The WTT Star Contender São José dos Campos 2026 was a table tennis tournament that took place at the Vale Sul Shopping, São José dos Campos, Brazil, from 21 to 26 July and had a total prize of US$300,000.

The previous edition of WTT Star Contender in Brazil was held in Foz do Iguaçu.

== Tournament ==
The WTT Star Contender São José dos Campos 2026 was the fourteenth tournament of the 2026 WTT Series and also part of the WTT Star Contender event.

=== Venue ===
This tournament was held at the Vale Sul Shopping in São José dos Campos, Brazil.

=== Point distribution ===
Below is the point distribution table for each phase of the tournament based on the WTT World Ranking for the WTT Star Contender event.

Event	Winner	Finalist	Semi-finalist	Quarter-finalist	Round of 16	Round of 32	Round of 48
Singles	600	420	270	175	115	30	5
Doubles	600	420	270	70	5	—	—

=== Prize pool ===
The total prize money was US$300,000 with the distribution of the prize money in accordance with WTT regulations.

Event	Winner	Finalist	Semi-finalist	Quarter-finalist	Round of 16	Round of 32	Round of 48
Singles	$17,000	$9,025	$4,250	$2,250	$1,500	$1,100	$900
Doubles	$5,500	$3,567	$2,125	$1,200	$650	—	—

== Men's singles ==
=== Seeds ===
1. (Brazil) Hugo Calderano (champion)
2. (France) Alexis Lebrun (final)
3. (Japan) Shunsuke Togami (quarter-finals)
4. (Slovenia) Darko Jorgić (quarter-finals)
5. (Germany) Benedikt Duda (third round)
6. (Germany) Patrick Franziska (quarter-finals)
7. (United States) Kanak Jha (third round)
8. (Japan) Hiroto Shinozuka (third round)
9. (Japan) Yukiya Uda (semi-finals)
10. (South Korea) An Jae-hyun (semi-finals)
11. (France) Thibault Poret (third round)
12. (South Korea) Oh Jun-sung (quarter-finals)
13. (Croatia) Tomislav Pucar (third round)
14. (Hong Kong) Wong Chun Ting (third round)
15. (Chinese Taipei) Feng Yi-hsin (third round)
16. (England) Tom Jarvis (third round)

=== Finals ===
Semi-finals
1	(Brazil) Hugo Calderano	11	15	12	21	11
9	(Japan) Yukiya Uda	5	17	14	19	8
10	(South Korea) An Jae-hyun	12	5	5
2	(France) Alexis Lebrun	14	11	11

Final
1	(Brazil) Hugo Calderano	11	3	11	13	4	8	11
2	(France) Alexis Lebrun	9	11	6	11	11	11	9

=== Top half ===
==== Section 1 ====
First round
(Germany) A Bertelsmeier	11	5	11	11
Q	(Chile) Á Fuentes	3	11	6	6
(Sweden) M Karlsson	16	11	16
(Italy) M Mutti	14	9	14
Q	(Chile) F Olivares	5	9	9
(France) L de Nodrest	11	11	11
(Hong Kong) B Chan	10	11	11	11
(Canada) E Ly	12	5	2	5

Second round
1	(Brazil) H Calderano	11	11	11
(Germany) A Bertelsmeier	7	8	5
(Sweden) M Karlsson	8	11	11	8
13	(Croatia) T Pucar	11	13	6	11
12	(South Korea) Oh J-s	10	11	11	8	12
(France) L de Nodrest	12	9	6	11	10
(Hong Kong) B Chan	9	11	9	9
5	(Germany) B Duda	11	7	11	11

Third round
1	(Brazil) H Calderano	11	11	4	11
13	(Croatia) T Pucar	9	5	11	6
12	(South Korea) Oh J-s	15	7	11	9	11
5	(Germany) B Duda	13	11	5	11	8

Quarter-finals
1	(Brazil) H Calderano	11	11	11
12	(South Korea) Oh J-s	9	6	4

==== Section 2 ====
First round
(Brazil) G Teodoro	9	11	11	11
(Mexico) R Castro	11	5	9	7
Q	(Denmark) I Diaw	11	11	6	11
(Chile) N Burgos	9	9	11	1
(Japan) Y Tanaka	11	12	11
(Chile) G Gomez	6	10	5
(Slovenia) D Kožul	11	11	11
WC	(United States) N Naresh	5	3	4

Second round
4	(Slovenia) D Jorgić	11	8	11	11
(Brazil) G Teodoro	5	11	7	8
Q	(Denmark) I Diaw	6	9	11	10
16	(England) T Jarvis	11	11	3	11
9	(Japan) Y Uda	11	9	8	13	11
(Japan) Y Tanaka	9	11	11	11	5
(Slovenia) D Kožul	5	6	8
8	(Japan) H Shinozuka	11	11	11

Third round
4	(Slovenia) D Jorgić	11	11	11
16	(England) T Jarvis	7	6	5
9	(Japan) Y Uda	11	11	11
8	(Japan) H Shinozuka	7	1	6

Quarter-finals
4	(Slovenia) D Jorgić	4	7	6
9	(Japan) Y Uda	11	11	11

=== Bottom half ===
==== Section 3 ====
First round
(Brazil) L Iizuka	8	9	7
(Hong Kong) Lam S H	11	11	11
Q	(Slovakia) J Zelinka	4	4	8
WC	(Japan) R Yoshiyama	11	11	11
WC	(Brazil) F Arado	11	12	11
Q	(Hong Kong) Kwan M H	9	10	9
WC	(Brazil) H Yamane	11	11	5	6	3
(Germany) K Stumper	5	7	11	11	11

Second round
7	(United States) K Jha	14	11	11
(Hong Kong) Lam S H	12	9	7
WC	(Japan) R Yoshiyama	9	11	11	10	4
10	(South Korea) An J-h	11	5	9	12	11
14	(Hong Kong) Wong C T	10	11	11	13
WC	(Brazil) F Arado	12	8	9	11
(Germany) K Stumper	11	5	4	11	7
3	(Japan) S Togami	4	11	11	2	11

Third round
7	(United States) K Jha	11	6	11	9
10	(South Korea) An J-h	6	11	13	11
14	(Hong Kong) Wong C T	2	11	6	6
3	(Japan) S Togami	11	9	11	11

Quarter-finals
10	(South Korea) An J-h	11	10	11	13
3	(Japan) S Togami	5	12	7	11

==== Section 4 ====
First round
Q	(Brazil) A Sarmento	9	4	9
WC	(Brazil) D Fujii	11	11	11
(Germany) W Verdonschot	11	11	6	11
(France) J Rolland	5	8	11	5
Q	(Colombia) E Otálvaro	11	11	5	7	7
(France) J Seyfried	7	9	11	11	11
(Slovakia) Ľ Pištej	11	11	11
Q	(Hong Kong) Yiu K T	8	9	7

Second round
6	(Germany) P Franziska	11	11	11
WC	(Brazil) D Fujii	6	8	4
(Germany) W Verdonschot	11	6	5	11	7
11	(France) T Poret	4	11	11	8	11
15	(Chinese Taipei) Feng Y-h	11	11	11
(France) J Seyfried	7	9	5
(Slovakia) Ľ Pištej	5	5	10
2	(France) A Lebrun	11	11	12

Third round
6	(Germany) P Franziska	8	12	11	11
11	(France) T Poret	11	10	7	9
15	(Chinese Taipei) Feng Y-h	12	4	7	7
2	(France) A Lebrun	10	11	11	11

Quarter-finals
6	(Germany) P Franziska	5	11	7	10
2	(France) A Lebrun	11	8	11	12

== Women's singles ==
=== Seeds ===
1. (Japan) Hina Hayata (champion)
2. (Japan) Satsuki Odo (quarter-finals)
3. (Japan) Honoka Hashimoto (semi-finals)
4. (Japan) Hitomi Sato (final)
5. (Puerto Rico) Adriana Díaz (withdrew)
6. (Japan) Miyu Nagasaki (semi-finals)
7. (Japan) Sakura Yokoi (quarter-finals)
8. (Brazil) Bruna Takahashi (third round)
9. (Hong Kong) Doo Hoi Kem (third round)
10. (Japan) Kaho Akae (quarter-finals)
11. (United States) Lily Zhang (third round)
12. (Germany) Nina Mittelham (quarter-finals)
13. (Chinese Taipei) Huang Yu-jie (third round)
14. (Individual Neutral Athletes) Elizabet Abraamian (third round)
15. (Canada) Mo Zhang (third round)
16. (India) Sreeja Akula (third round)

=== Finals ===
Semi-finals
1	(Japan) Hina Hayata	11	9	11	11	11
3	(Japan) Honoka Hashimoto	13	11	4	7	7
4	(Japan) Hitomi Sato	11	11	11
6	(Japan) Miyu Nagasaki	9	6	7

Final
1	(Japan) Hina Hayata	8	11	4	11	11	11
4	(Japan) Hitomi Sato	11	7	11	9	7	8

=== Top half ===
==== Section 1 ====
First round
(Sweden) F Bergand	8	4	4
(Hong Kong) Ng W L	11	11	11
(Brazil) L Watanabe	11	11	11
Q	(Chile) S Vega	8	8	5
WC	(Brazil) B Fiore	11	11	11
Q	(Brazil) M Franco	2	7	3
Q	(Brazil) J Prates	4	5	3
(Chile) D Ortega	11	11	11

Second round
1	(Japan) H Hayata	11	11	11
(Hong Kong) Ng W L	7	4	6
(Brazil) L Watanabe	1	2	6
14	(Individual Neutral Athletes) E Abraamian	11	11	11
12	(Germany) N Mittelham	11	11	13
WC	(Brazil) B Fiore	9	5	11
(Chile) D Ortega	12	9	11	5	6
8	(Brazil) B Takahashi	10	11	9	11	11

Third round
1	(Japan) H Hayata	11	12	11
14	(Individual Neutral Athletes) E Abraamian	6	10	7
12	(Germany) N Mittelham	7	11	11	4	11
8	(Brazil) B Takahashi	11	8	9	11	8

Quarter-finals
1	(Japan) H Hayata	11	11	11	11
12	(Germany) N Mittelham	4	9	13	2

==== Section 2 ====
First round
Q	(Brazil) B Borges	5	4	5
WC	(Japan) S Aoki	11	11	11
Q	(Chile) V Ríos	11	11	13	10	12
(Hong Kong) Lam Y L	9	9	15	12	10
(Mexico) A Cossio	5	6	3
Q	(Hong Kong) Lee H M	11	11	11
WC	(Brazil) I Amorim	8	7	5
(Hong Kong) Su T T	11	11	11

Second round
3	(Japan) H Hashimoto	6	11	11	11
WC	(Japan) S Aoki	11	6	8	3
Q	(Chile) V Ríos	8	5	10
15/WC	(Canada) M Zhang	11	11	12
10	(Japan) K Akae	11	11	11
Q	(Hong Kong) Lee H M	9	9	2
(Hong Kong) Su T T	10	6	11	3
(Japan) S Shibata	12	11	7	11

Third round
3	(Japan) H Hashimoto	10	11	11	11
15/WC	(Canada) M Zhang	12	2	3	4
10	(Japan) K Akae	11	13	11
(Japan) S Shibata	4	11	4

Quarter-finals
3	(Japan) H Hashimoto	11	9	11	12
10	(Japan) K Akae	8	11	4	10

=== Bottom half ===
==== Section 3 ====
First round
(Argentina) A Codina	11	7	11	5	11
(Brazil) K Shiray	6	11	7	11	7
(South Korea) Yoo Y-r	11	11	11
(Chile) P Vega	8	5	9
(France) C Picard	11	10	11	11
(Slovakia) T Kukuľková	8	12	7	7
WC	(Brazil) B Kanashiro	9	7	4
(France) C Lutz	11	11	11

Second round
7	(Japan) S Yokoi	11	11	11
(Argentina) A Codina	7	5	8
(South Korea) Yoo Y-r	9	7	9
9	(Hong Kong) Doo H K	11	11	11
16	(India) S Akula	7	11	11	11
(France) C Picard	11	5	7	9
(France) C Lutz	6	11	14	5
4	(Japan) H Sato	11	13	12	11

Third round
7	(Japan) S Yokoi	11	11	11
9	(Hong Kong) Doo H K	4	7	8
16	(India) S Akula	2	6	8
4	(Japan) H Sato	11	11	11

Quarter-finals
7	(Japan) S Yokoi	6	11	9	8
4	(Japan) H Sato	11	9	11	11

==== Section 4 ====
First round
Q	(Brazil) L Fontanive	11	11	7	7	5
(Brazil) G Takahashi	8	8	11	11	11
(Italy) D Vivarelli	11	11	11
Q	(Brazil) M Agnone	8	7	6
Q	(Brazil) G Zago	2	4	3
(Germany) F Schreiner	11	11	11
Q	(Brazil) S Kano	7	5	7
WC	(Brazil) V Strassburger	11	11	11

Second round
6	(Japan) M Nagasaki	8	11	11	11
(Brazil) G Takahashi	11	7	2	5
(Italy) D Vivarelli	12	8	6	5
11	(United States) L Zhang	10	11	11	11
13	(Chinese Taipei) Huang Y-j	6	11	11	11
(Germany) F Schreiner	11	8	6	6
WC	(Brazil) V Strassburger	3	6	11	7
2	(Japan) S Odo	11	11	7	11

Third round
6	(Japan) M Nagasaki	11	5	12	11	11
11	(United States) L Zhang	1	11	14	6	5
13	(Chinese Taipei) Huang Y-j	11	7	7	6
2	(Japan) S Odo	7	11	11	11

Quarter-finals
6	(Japan) M Nagasaki	11	11	11
2	(Japan) S Odo	4	8	5

== Men's doubles ==
=== Seeds ===
1. (Hong Kong) Wong Chun Ting / (Hong Kong) Baldwin Chan (champions)
2. (Chile) Nicolás Burgos / (Chile) Gustavo Gomez (quarter-finals)
3. (Brazil) Leonardo Iizuka / (Brazil) Guilherme Teodoro (quarter-finals)
4. (Germany) Benedikt Duda / (Germany) Patrick Franziska (first round)

=== Finals ===
Semi-finals
1	(Hong Kong) Wong Chun Ting (Hong Kong) Baldwin Chan	10	12	4	11	11
(Germany) André Bertelsmeier (Germany) Wim Verdonschot	12	10	11	1	6
(France) Leo De Nodrest (France) Jules Rolland	12	5	7
(France) Joe Seyfried (France) Vincent Picard	14	11	11

Final
1	(Hong Kong) Wong Chun Ting (Hong Kong) Baldwin Chan	11	11	7	14	11
(France) Joe Seyfried (France) Vincent Picard	5	13	11	12	9

=== Top half ===
First round
1	(Hong Kong) Wong C T (Hong Kong) B Chan	11	11	13	11
Q	(England) T Jarvis (United States) K Jha	7	13	11	7
(Slovenia) D Jorgić (Slovenia) D Kožul	11	11	9	11
Q	(Canada) E Ly (France) A Kouraichi	1	3	11	8
3	(Brazil) L Iizuka (Brazil) G Teodoro	11	11	11
WC	(Brazil) F Arado (Brazil) H Yamane	4	9	9
(Mexico) M Madrid (Mexico) R Castro	10	8	12	9
(Germany) A Bertelsmeier (Germany) W Verdonschot	12	11	10	11

Quarter-finals
1	(Hong Kong) Wong C T (Hong Kong) B Chan	10	6	11	11	11
(Slovenia) D Jorgić (Slovenia) D Kožul	12	11	5	7	6
3	(Brazil) L Iizuka (Brazil) G Teodoro	11	9	6	11	9
(Germany) A Bertelsmeier (Germany) W Verdonschot	5	11	11	8	11

Semi-finals
1	(Hong Kong) Wong C T (Hong Kong) B Chan	10	12	4	11	11
(Germany) A Bertelsmeier (Germany) W Verdonschot	12	10	11	1	6

=== Bottom half ===
First round
WC	(Brazil) D Fujii (Brazil) F Okano	10	7	4
Q	(Hong Kong) Lam S H (Hong Kong) Yiu K T	12	11	11
(France) L de Nodrest (France) J Rolland	11	11	11
4	(Germany) B Duda (Germany) P Franziska	4	9	7
Q	(Chile) E Vos (Chile) F Olivares	5	5	6
(France) J Seyfried (France) V Picard	11	11	11
(Slovakia) Ľ Pištej (Slovakia) J Zelinka	6	11	8	11	10
2	(Chile) N Burgos (Chile) G Gomez	11	9	11	9	12

Quarter-finals
Q	(Hong Kong) Lam S H (Hong Kong) Yiu K T	10	11	6	10
(France) L de Nodrest (France) J Rolland	12	8	11	12
(France) J Seyfried (France) V Picard	11	10	9	11	11
2	(Chile) N Burgos (Chile) G Gomez	2	12	11	8	4

Semi-finals
(France) L de Nodrest (France) J Rolland	12	5	7
(France) J Seyfried (France) V Picard	14	11	11

== Women's doubles ==
=== Seeds ===
1. (Japan) Hitomi Sato / (Japan) Saki Shibata (semi-finals)
2. (Japan) Sakura Yokoi / (Japan) Sachi Aoki (semi-finals)
3. (Japan) Hina Hayata / (Japan) Kaho Akae (champions)
4. (Hong Kong) Doo Hoi Kem / (Hong Kong) Ng Wing Lam (final)

=== Finals ===
Semi-finals
1	(Japan) Hitomi Sato (Japan) Saki Shibata	9	7	3
3	(Japan) Hina Hayata (Japan) Kaho Akae	11	11	11
4	(Hong Kong) Doo Hoi Kem (Hong Kong) Ng Wing Lam	11	11	12	8	11
2	(Japan) Sakura Yokoi (Japan) Sachi Aoki	7	8	14	11	9

Final
3	(Japan) Hina Hayata (Japan) Kaho Akae	11	11	11
4	(Hong Kong) Doo Hoi Kem (Hong Kong) Ng Wing Lam	8	9	2

=== Top half ===
First round
1	(Japan) H Sato (Japan) S Shibata	11	11	11
WC	(Brazil) K Shiray (Brazil) B Fiore	6	7	2
Q	(Brazil) J Prates (Brazil) S Kano	5	9	12	7
(Chile) P Vega (Chile) D Ortega	11	11	10	11
3	(Japan) H Hayata (Japan) K Akae	11	13	11
Q	(Chile) V Ríos (Chile) S Vega	5	11	4
(Brazil) G Takahashi (Brazil) L Watanabe	2	11	12	3
(Slovakia) T Kukuľková (Individual Neutral Athletes) E Abraamian	11	7	14	11

Quarter-finals
1	(Japan) H Sato (Japan) S Shibata	11	11	11
(Chile) P Vega (Chile) D Ortega	8	6	2
3	(Japan) H Hayata (Japan) K Akae	7	11	11	11
(Slovakia) T Kukuľková (Individual Neutral Athletes) E Abraamian	11	7	7	2

Semi-finals
1	(Japan) H Sato (Japan) S Shibata	9	7	3
3	(Japan) H Hayata (Japan) K Akae	11	11	11

=== Bottom half ===
First round
WC	(Brazil) V Strassburger (Brazil) B Kanashiro	11	10	11	11
Q	(Brazil) B Borges (Brazil) L Fontanive	7	12	8	9
(Hong Kong) Su T T (Hong Kong) Lee H M	2	14	9	11	2
4	(Hong Kong) Doo H K (Hong Kong) Ng W L	11	12	11	8	11
Q	(Brazil) M Sarda (Brazil) M Agnone	3	3	6
(Mexico) A Cossio (Sweden) F Bergand	11	11	11
Q	(Brazil) I Amorim (Brazil) G Zago	6	3	5
2	(Japan) S Yokoi (Japan) S Aoki	11	11	11

Quarter-finals
WC	(Brazil) V Strassburger (Brazil) B Kanashiro	7	11	13	7
4	(Hong Kong) Doo H K (Hong Kong) Ng W L	11	7	15	11
(Mexico) A Cossio (Sweden) F Bergand	5	2	3
2	(Japan) S Yokoi (Japan) S Aoki	11	11	11

Semi-finals
4	(Hong Kong) Doo H K (Hong Kong) Ng W L	11	11	12	8	11
2	(Japan) S Yokoi (Japan) S Aoki	7	8	14	11	9

== Mixed doubles ==
=== Seeds ===
1. (Brazil) Hugo Calderano / (Brazil) Bruna Takahashi (final)
2. (Hong Kong) Wong Chun Ting / (Hong Kong) Doo Hoi Kem (semi-finals)
3. (Japan) Shunsuke Togami / (Japan) Satsuki Odo (champions)
4. (Chile) Gustavo Gomez / (Chile) Daniela Ortega (quarter-finals)

=== Finals ===
Semi-finals
1	(Brazil) Hugo Calderano (Brazil) Bruna Takahashi	11	11	10	11
(Hong Kong) Yiu Kwan To (Hong Kong) Ng Wing Lam	1	7	12	9
3	(Japan) Shunsuke Togami (Japan) Satsuki Odo	11	11	9	11
2	(Hong Kong) Wong Chun Ting (Hong Kong) Doo Hoi Kem	7	5	11	8

Final
1	(Brazil) Hugo Calderano (Brazil) Bruna Takahashi	7	11	1	10
3	(Japan) Shunsuke Togami (Japan) Satsuki Odo	11	9	11	12

=== Top half ===
First round
1	(Brazil) H Calderano (Brazil) B Takahashi	11	12	11
Q	(Chile) E Vos (Chile) V Rios	0	10	6
Q	(Germany) B Duda (Germany) N Mittelham	11	11	10	4	5
(Brazil) G Teodoro (Brazil) G Takahashi	4	8	12	11	11
4	(Chile) G Gomez (Chile) D Ortega	10	11	8	11	11
(Slovakia) Ľ Pištej (Slovakia) T Kukuľková	12	8	11	5	8
(Chile) N Burgos (Chile) P Vega	7	7	11	11	10
(Hong Kong) Yiu K T (Hong Kong) Ng W L	11	11	7	9	12

Quarter-finals
1	(Brazil) H Calderano (Brazil) B Takahashi	11	5	11	11
(Brazil) G Teodoro (Brazil) G Takahashi	9	11	8	9
4	(Chile) G Gomez (Chile) D Ortega	5	10	8
(Hong Kong) Yiu K T (Hong Kong) Ng W L	11	12	11

Semi-finals
1	(Brazil) H Calderano (Brazil) B Takahashi
(Hong Kong) Yiu K T (Hong Kong) Ng W L

=== Bottom half ===
First round
Q	(South Korea) Oh J-s (South Korea) Yoo Y-r	11	6	11	13
WC	(Brazil) F Arado (Brazil) L Watanabe	9	11	9	11
(France) A Lebrun (France) C Lutz	6	7	11	11	8
3	(Japan) S Togami (Japan) S Odo	11	11	9	6	11
(Canada) E Ly (Canada) M Zhang	12	11	11	9	7
Q	(France) V Picard (Individual Neutral Athletes) E Abraamian	10	8	13	11	11
WC	(Brazil) L Iizuka (Brazil) V Strassburger	9	5	3
2	(Hong Kong) Wong C T (Hong Kong) Doo H K	11	11	11

Quarter-finals
Q	(South Korea) Oh J-s (South Korea) Yoo Y-r	8	11	8	9
3	(Japan) S Togami (Japan) S Odo	11	9	11	11
Q	(France) V Picard (Individual Neutral Athletes) E Abraamian	9	8	8
2	(Hong Kong) Wong C T (Hong Kong) Doo H K	11	11	11

Semi-finals
3	(Japan) S Togami (Japan) S Odo
2	(Hong Kong) Wong C T (Hong Kong) Doo H K

Preceded by United States Smash 2026	2026 WTT Series	Succeeded by WTT Champions Yokohama 2026
