= WTT Star Contender Muscat 2026 =

Table tennis tournament in Oman

Tournament details
- Dates: 16–21 November
- Edition: 2nd
- Total prize money: US$300,000
- Venue: Sultan Qaboos Sports Complex
- Location: Muscat, Oman

Champions
- Men's singles: (Japan) Shunsuke Togami
- Women's singles: (Japan) Honoka Hashimoto
- Men's doubles: (South Korea) Lim Jong-hoon (South Korea) Oh Jun-sung
- Women's doubles: (Japan) Satsuki Odo (Japan) Sakura Yokoi
- Mixed doubles: (Japan) Shunsuke Togami (Japan) Satsuki Odo

The WTT Star Contender Muscat 2026 was a table tennis tournament that took place at the Sultan Qaboos Sports Complex, Muscat, Oman, from 16 to 21 November and had a total prize of US$300,000.

== Tournament ==
The WTT Star Contender Muscat 2026 was the twenty-fifth tournament of the 2026 WTT Series and also part of the WTT Star Contender event.

=== Venue ===
This tournament was held at the Sultan Qaboos Sports Complex in Muscat, Oman.

=== Point distribution ===
Below was the point distribution table for each phase of the tournament based on the WTT World Ranking for the WTT Star Contender event.

Event	Winner	Finalist	Semi-finalist	Quarter-finalist	Round of 16	Round of 32	Round of 48
Singles	600	420	270	175	115	30	5
Doubles	600	420	270	70	5	—	—

=== Prize pool ===
The total prize money was US$300,000 with the distribution of the prize money in accordance with WTT regulations.

Event	Winner	Finalist	Semi-finalist	Quarter-finalist	Round of 16	Round of 32	Round of 48
Singles	$17,000	$9,025	$4,250	$2,250	$1,500	$1,100	$900
Doubles	$5,500	$3,567	$2,125	$1,200	$650	—	—

== Men's singles ==
=== Seeds ===
1. (Slovenia) Darko Jorgić (second round)
2. (Japan) Shunsuke Togami (champion)
3. (Germany) Dang Qiu (withdrew)
4. (Russia) Vladimir Sidorenko (quarter-finals)
5. (South Korea) Oh Jun-sung (semi-finals)
6. (Japan) Hiroto Shinozuka (third round)
7. (Germany) Dimitrij Ovtcharov (quarter-finals)
8. (France) Flavien Coton (quarter-finals)
9. (Croatia) Tomislav Pucar (third round)
10. (Egypt) Omar Assar (second round)
11. (China) Chen Yuanyu (semi-finals)
12. (South Korea) Lim Jong-hoon (third round)
13. (France) Simon Gauzy (second round)
14. (South Korea) An Jae-hyun (second round)
15. (Germany) Wim Verdonschot (second round)
16. (Portugal) João Geraldo (second round)

=== Finals ===
Semi-finals
(South Korea) Park Gang-hyeon	11	6	11	11
5	(South Korea) Oh Jun-sung	7	11	6	9
11	(China) Chen Yuanyu	6	10	3
2	(Japan) Shunsuke Togami	11	12	11

Final
(South Korea) Park Gang-hyeon	11	6	7	5	14
2	(Japan) Shunsuke Togami	6	11	11	11	16

=== Top half ===
==== Section 1 ====
First round
WC	(India) A Bhattacharjee	8	11	11	10	7
Q	(China) Sun Y	11	5	4	12	11
Q	(France) L Bardet	8	10	11	8
(South Korea) Park G-h	11	12	5	11
WC	(Portugal) M Freitas	6	9	11	11	8
(China) Huang YZ	11	11	4	6	11
(Germany) A Bertelsmeier	11	11	8	10	11
Q	(China) Tang YR	9	8	11	12	7

Second round
1	(Slovenia) D Jorgić	11	9	11	5
Q	(China) Sun Y	13	11	9	11
(South Korea) Park G-h	11	11	11
14	(South Korea) An J-h	8	5	9
9	(Croatia) T Pucar	6	5	11	12	11
(China) Huang YZ	11	11	8	10	9
(Germany) A Bertelsmeier	6	6	10
8	(France) F Coton	11	11	12

Third round
Q	(China) Sun Y	6	12	7	14	5
(South Korea) Park G-h	11	10	11	12	11
9	(Croatia) T Pucar	11	10	4	5
8	(France) F Coton	6	12	11	11

Quarter-finals
(South Korea) Park G-h	11	2	11	9	11
8	(France) F Coton	9	11	7	11	8

==== Section 2 ====
First round
(Algeria) M Bouloussa	12	11	10	12	7
(Hungary) C András	10	6	12	14	11
Q	(Japan) Y Tanaka	11	10	5	10
(Romania) I Chirita	8	12	11	12
(Australia) N Lum	11	11	6	11
WC	(Iran) N Shams	6	6	11	8
Q	(Norway) B Haug	7	7	11	6
(Japan) R Yoshiyama	11	11	9	11

Second round
4/WC	(Russia) V Sidorenko	11	11	11
(Hungary) C András	2	9	4
(Romania) I Chirita	16	8	11	9	11
13	(France) S Gauzy	14	11	6	11	5
12	(South Korea) Lim J-h	11	11	11
(Australia) N Lum	7	3	9
(Japan) R Yoshiyama	11	2	2	10
5	(South Korea) Oh J-s	4	11	11	12

Third round
4/WC	(Russia) V Sidorenko	9	11	8	11	11
(Romania) I Chirita	11	9	11	6	4
12	(South Korea) Lim J-h	14	8	16	11	7
5	(South Korea) Oh J-s	16	11	14	5	11

Quarter-finals
4/WC	(Russia) V Sidorenko	9	9	6
5	(South Korea) Oh J-s	11	11	11

=== Bottom half ===
==== Section 3 ====
First round
(India) M Shah	11	5	9	11	7
(Japan) R Kawakami	8	11	11	5	11
Q	(Russia) M Grebnev	11	11	11
WC	(Colombia) E Otálvaro	9	9	9
Q	(China) Yuan LC	11	11	11
(Denmark) J Groth	9	8	7
Q	(Romania) E Ionescu	5	11	11	11
(Australia) F Luu	11	3	3	7

Second round
6	(Japan) H Shinozuka	3	11	13	11
(Japan) R Kawakami	11	9	11	8
Q	(Russia) M Grebnev	11	2	2	10
11	(China) Chen YY	9	11	11	12
16	(Portugal) J Geraldo	8	13	9	10
Q	(China) Yuan LC	11	11	11	12
Q	(Romania) E Ionescu	11	7	11	5
(China) Li TY	13	11	7	11

Third round
6	(Japan) H Shinozuka	9	7	0
11	(China) Chen YY	11	11	11
Q	(China) Yuan LC	8	11	11	5	12
(China) Li TY	11	8	5	11	10

Quarter-finals
11	(China) Chen YY	3	11	7	11	11
Q	(China) Yuan LC	11	8	11	6	5

==== Section 4 ====
First round
(Czech Republic) L Jančařík	6	3	11	11	11
(Spain) Á Robles	11	11	6	9	8
Q	(South Korea) Kwon H	11	11	6	10	11
WC	(Croatia) A Gaćina	8	9	11	12	4
WC	(Germany) R Walther	11	2	11	11	9
(France) J Seyfried	8	11	13	7	11
(India) M Thakkar	11	11	12	11
Q	(South Korea) Kang D-s	7	8	14	5

Second round
7	(Germany) D Ovtcharov	11	11	10	11
(Czech Republic) L Jančařík	6	9	12	9
Q	(South Korea) Kwon H	7	11	11	10	11
10	(Egypt) O Assar	11	3	5	12	4
15	(Germany) W Verdonschot	9	6	7
(France) J Seyfried	11	11	11
(India) M Thakkar	6	4	5
2	(Japan) S Togami	11	11	11

Third round
7	(Germany) D Ovtcharov	11	11	11
Q	(South Korea) Kwon H	8	6	8
(France) J Seyfried	11	3	3	3
2	(Japan) S Togami	7	11	11	11

Quarter-finals
7	(Germany) D Ovtcharov	10	9	13
2	(Japan) S Togami	12	11	15

== Women's singles ==
=== Seeds ===
1. (Japan) Satsuki Odo (semi-finals)
2. (Japan) Honoka Hashimoto (champion)
3. (South Korea) Joo Cheon-hui (quarter-finals)
4. (Japan) Miyu Nagasaki (quarter-finals)
5. (Romania) Bernadette Szőcs (semi-finals)
6. (Japan) Sakura Yokoi (third round)
7. (China) Qin Yuxuan (third round)
8. (Russia) Elizabet Abraamian (third round)
9. (South Korea) Kim Na-yeong (quarter-finals)
10. (Chinese Taipei) Cheng I-ching (quarter-finals)
11. (France) Jia Nan Yuan (second round)
12. (Japan) Kaho Akae (final)
13. (Australia) Yangzi Liu (second round)
14. (Romania) Elizabeta Samara (second round)
15. (Canada) Mo Zhang (second round)
16. (Chinese Taipei) Yeh Yi-tian (second round)

=== Finals ===
Semi-finals
1	(Japan) Satsuki Odo	6	11	14	9
12	(Japan) Kaho Akae	11	13	12	11
5	(Romania) Bernadette Szőcs	6	4	11	4
2	(Japan) Honoka Hashimoto	11	11	9	11

Final
12	(Japan) Kaho Akae	12	6	11	7	6	10
2	(Japan) Honoka Hashimoto	10	11	4	11	11	12

=== Top half ===
==== Section 1 ====
First round
Q	(Sweden) F Bergand	11	10	7	8
(Turkey) E Haraç	5	12	11	11
(France) A Zarif	11	5	12	7	11
(France) Ca Lutz	8	11	10	11	5
Q	(Spain) S-X Zhang	9	11	9	7
(Australia) M Jee	11	8	11	11
(Romania) E Zaharia	9	9	11	11	11
(France) Ch Lutz	11	11	7	9	5

Second round
1	(Japan) S Odo	11	8	15	11
(Turkey) E Haraç	4	11	13	6
(France) A Zarif	13	12	11
15	(Canada) M Zhang	11	10	7
9	(South Korea) Kim N-y	11	12	11
(Australia) M Jee	6	10	8
(Romania) E Zaharia	9	4	11	7
8/WC	(Russia) E Abraamian	11	11	8	11

Third round
1	(Japan) S Odo	11	11	13
(France) A Zarif	9	3	11
9	(South Korea) Kim N-y	4	9	11	11	14
8/WC	(Russia) E Abraamian	11	11	9	8	12

Quarter-finals
1	(Japan) S Odo	11	11	11
9	(South Korea) Kim N-y	5	6	6

==== Section 2 ====
First round
(China) Fan SH	8	11	11	11
Q	(China) Yang HZ	11	4	7	7
Q	(China) Feng YX	6	8	9
(Monaco) X Yang	11	11	11
Q	(Slovenia) A Tofant	5	4	7
(Romania) A Dragoman	11	11	11
Q	(Kazakhstan) S Mirkadirova	4	3	9
(Japan) S Shibata	11	11	11

Second round
4	(Japan) M Nagasaki	11	11	14	11
(China) Fan SH	13	6	12	5
(Monaco) X Yang	11	11	5	11	11
13	(Australia) Y Liu	7	8	11	13	8
12	(Japan) K Akae	11	14	11	6	11
(Romania) A Dragoman	8	16	5	11	5
(Japan) S Shibata	6	11	10	11	8
7	(China) Qin YX	11	9	12	7	11

Third round
4	(Japan) M Nagasaki	12	11	11
(Monaco) X Yang	10	1	3
12	(Japan) K Akae	11	11	11
7	(China) Qin YX	6	2	3

Quarter-finals
4	(Japan) M Nagasaki	11	11	3	2	11
12	(Japan) K Akae	9	7	11	11	13

=== Bottom half ===
==== Section 3 ====
First round
(India) M Batra	11	6	9	3
Q	(China) Wei JM	7	11	11	11
(Japan) S Aoki	11	2	7	11	11
(China) Zong GM	8	11	11	7	6
(China) Wang XT	11	11	11
(Italy) G Piccolin	3	9	7
(Italy) G Monfardini	11	7	4	12	10
WC	(Slovakia) T Kukuľková	8	11	11	10	12

Second round
5	(Romania) B Szőcs	7	14	11	11	11
Q	(China) Wei JM	11	16	9	6	4
(Japan) S Aoki	5	6	11	11	11
11	(France) J N Yuan	11	11	9	6	6
14	(Romania) E Samara	14	11	18	10
(China) Wang XT	16	5	20	12
WC	(Slovakia) T Kukuľková	2	4	5
3	(South Korea) Joo C-h	11	11	11

Third round
5	(Romania) B Szőcs	11	11	11
(Japan) S Aoki	9	4	6
(China) Wang XT	11	7	11	8	9
3	(South Korea) Joo C-h	7	11	5	11	11

Quarter-finals
5	(Romania) B Szőcs	11	12	7	11
3	(South Korea) Joo C-h	8	10	11	7

==== Section 4 ====
First round
(Sweden) C Källberg	4	11	5	11	11
(South Korea) Yoo Y-r	11	9	11	9	5
(Spain) M Xiao	11	11	13
(Austria) S Polcanova	8	5	11
Q	(Japan) C Muramatsu	11	4	8	11	6
(South Korea) Kim S-j	4	11	11	6	11
(Luxembourg) S de Nutte	7	4	11	11	2
WC	(India) S Akula	11	11	4	6	11

Second round
6	(Japan) S Yokoi	7	11	11	13
(Sweden) C Källberg	11	6	8	11
(Spain) M Xiao	8	11	11	8	3
10	(Chinese Taipei) Cheng I-c	11	8	3	11	11
16	(Chinese Taipei) Yeh Y-t	7	8	11	11	10
(South Korea) Kim S-j	11	11	3	8	12
WC	(India) S Akula	9	11	7	5
2	(Japan) H Hashimoto	11	8	11	11

Third round
6	(Japan) S Yokoi	2	5	8
10	(Chinese Taipei) Cheng I-c	11	11	11
(South Korea) Kim S-j	1	7	6
2	(Japan) H Hashimoto	11	11	11

Quarter-finals
10	(Chinese Taipei) Cheng I-c	7	3	5
2	(Japan) H Hashimoto	11	11	11

== Men's doubles ==
=== Seeds ===
1. (South Korea) Lim Jong-hoon / (South Korea) Oh Jun-sung (champions)
2. (India) Manav Thakkar / (India) Manush Shah (final)
3. (France) Leo de Nodrest / (France) Lilian Bardet (semi-finals)
4. (Russia) Lev Katsman / (Russia) Maksim Grebnev (quarter-finals)

=== Finals ===
Semi-finals
1	(South Korea) Lim Jong-hoon (South Korea) Oh Jun-sung	9	11	11	11
3	(France) Leo de Nodrest (France) Lilian Bardet	11	3	7	6
Q	(France) Simon Gauzy (France) Flavien Coton	9	11	6	8
2	(India) Manav Thakkar (India) Manush Shah	11	8	11	11

Final
1	(South Korea) Lim Jong-hoon (South Korea) Oh Jun-sung	10	11	11	11
2	(India) Manav Thakkar (India) Manush Shah	12	2	8	8

=== Top half ===
First round
1	(South Korea) Lim J-h (South Korea) Oh J-s	11	11	6	11
Q	(Japan) R Yoshiyama (Japan) R Kawakami	7	4	11	5
(China) Chen YY (China) Huang YZ	11	6	8	8
(France) J Seyfried (France) V Picard	8	11	11	11
3	(France) L de Nodrest (France) L Bardet	9	11	11	11
(Australia) N Lum (Australia) F Luu	11	9	5	6
Q	(China) Chen JS (China) Tang YR	5	12	11	8
(Croatia) A Gaćina (Croatia) I Ban	11	14	5	11

Quarter-finals
1	(South Korea) Lim J-h (South Korea) Oh J-s	11	12	11
(France) J Seyfried (France) V Picard	5	10	7
3	(France) L de Nodrest (France) L Bardet	11	11	4	7	11
(Croatia) A Gaćina (Croatia) I Ban	6	8	11	11	4

Semi-finals
1	(South Korea) Lim J-h (South Korea) Oh J-s	9	11	11	11
3	(France) L de Nodrest (France) L Bardet	11	3	7	6

=== Bottom half ===
First round
(Turkey) I Gündüz (Turkey) A Yigenler	11	8	6	13
Q	(France) S Gauzy (France) F Coton	9	11	11	15
Q	(Romania) A Istrate (Romania) I Chirita	11	11	11	4	5
4	(Russia) L Katsman (Russia) M Grebnev	13	2	9	11	11
(Germany) A Bertelsmeier (Germany) W Verdonschot	11	7	11	11
WC	(Oman) M Al Balushi (Oman) A Al Riyami	3	11	3	4
Q	(Czech Republic) L Jančařík (Australia) A Sareen	7	9	4
2	(India) M Thakkar (India) M Shah	11	11	11

Quarter-finals
Q	(France) S Gauzy (France) F Coton	11	11	6	11	11
4	(Russia) L Katsman (Russia) M Grebnev	6	8	11	13	7
(Germany) A Bertelsmeier (Germany) W Verdonschot	5	7	11	11	11
2	(India) M Thakkar (India) M Shah	11	11	9	7	13

Semi-finals
Q	(France) S Gauzy (France) F Coton	9	11	6	8
2	(India) M Thakkar (India) M Shah	11	8	11	11

== Women's doubles ==
=== Seeds ===
1. (South Korea) Kim Na-yeong / (South Korea) Joo Cheon-hui (final)
2. (Japan) Satsuki Odo / (Japan) Sakura Yokoi (champions)
3. (Romania) Bernadette Szőcs / (Romania) Elizabeta Samara (semi-finals)
4. (Japan) Saki Shibata / (Japan) Sachi Aoki (semi-finals)

=== Finals ===
Semi-finals
1	(South Korea) Kim Na-yeong (South Korea) Joo Cheon-hui	11	2	11	11
4	(Japan) Saki Shibata (Japan) Sachi Aoki	8	11	7	8
3	(Romania) Bernadette Szőcs (Romania) Elizabeta Samara	8	6	5
2	(Japan) Satsuki Odo (Japan) Sakura Yokoi	11	11	11

Final
1	(South Korea) Kim Na-yeong (South Korea) Joo Cheon-hui	7	9	6
2	(Japan) Satsuki Odo (Japan) Sakura Yokoi	11	11	11

=== Top half ===
First round
1	(South Korea) Kim N-y (South Korea) Joo C-h	11	2	11	9	11
Q	(South Korea) Kim S-j (South Korea) Yoo S-w	9	11	6	11	9
(Japan) H Hashimoto (Japan) M Nagasaki	11	11	15
(China) Qin YX (China) Zong GM	6	7	13
4	(Japan) S Shibata (Japan) S Aoki	11	11	11
(Romania) A Dragoman (Romania) A Diaconu	8	9	7
Q	(China) Feng YX (China) Fan SH	11	11	11	5	11
(Sweden) F Bergand (Italy) G Monfardini	13	7	9	11	3

Quarter-finals
1	(South Korea) Kim N-y (South Korea) Joo C-h	8	14	9	11	11
(Japan) H Hashimoto (Japan) M Nagasaki	11	12	11	7	3
4	(Japan) S Shibata (Japan) S Aoki	11	7	11	11
Q	(China) Feng YX (China) Fan SH	9	11	9	8

Semi-finals
1	(South Korea) Kim N-y (South Korea) Joo C-h	11	2	11	11
4	(Japan) S Shibata (Japan) S Aoki	8	11	7	8

=== Bottom half ===
First round
(Austria) S Polcanova (Australia) Y Liu	13	7	8	11
(India) S Ghosh (India) M Batra	11	11	11	13
Q	(France) I Cok (Slovenia) A Tofant	6	13	4
3	(Romania) B Szőcs (Romania) E Samara	11	15	11
Q	(France) Ca Lutz (France) A Zarif	11	10	10	5
WC	(China) Wang XT (China) Xu Y	6	12	12	11
WC	(France) J N Yuan (France) Ch Lutz	11	9	2	8
2	(Japan) S Odo (Japan) S Yokoi	8	11	11	11

Quarter-finals
(India) S Ghosh (India) M Batra	5	8	8
3	(Romania) B Szőcs (Romania) E Samara	11	11	11
WC	(China) Wang XT (China) Xu Y	6	11	10	8
2	(Japan) S Odo (Japan) S Yokoi	11	6	12	11

Semi-finals
3	(Romania) B Szőcs (Romania) E Samara	8	6	5
2	(Japan) S Odo (Japan) S Yokoi	11	11	11

== Mixed doubles ==
=== Seeds ===
1. (Spain) Álvaro Robles / (Spain) María Xiao (quarter-finals)
2. (Japan) Shunsuke Togami / (Japan) Satsuki Odo (champions)
3. (Romania) Eduard Ionescu / (Romania) Bernadette Szőcs (semi-finals)
4. (Australia) Nicholas Lum / (Australia) Yangzi Liu (semi-finals)

=== Finals ===
Semi-finals
(France) Esteban Dorr (France) Jia Nan Yuan	11	11	8	11
3	(Romania) Eduard Ionescu (Romania) Bernadette Szőcs	6	5	11	9
4	(Australia) Nicholas Lum (Australia) Yangzi Liu	5	11	10	10
2	(Japan) Shunsuke Togami (Japan) Satsuki Odo	11	6	12	12

Final
(France) Esteban Dorr (France) Jia Nan Yuan	6	5	14	3
2	(Japan) Shunsuke Togami (Japan) Satsuki Odo	11	11	12	11

=== Top half ===
First round
1	(Spain) Á Robles (Spain) M Xiao	11	13	9	11
WC	(India) A Bhattacharjee (India) M Batra	9	11	11	8
(France) E Dorr (France) J N Yuan	11	13	11	11
Q	(South Korea) Kwon H (South Korea) Yoo Y-r	6	15	7	5
3	(Romania) E Ionescu (Romania) B Szőcs	11	11	12
(Australia) F Luu (Australia) J Wu	4	6	10
Q	(Japan) J Yokotani (Japan) C Muramatsu	8	8	11	12	11
(France) F Coton (France) Ch Lutz	11	11	8	10	9

Quarter-finals
1	(Spain) Á Robles (Spain) M Xiao	11	6	11	11	9
(France) E Dorr (France) J N Yuan	4	11	6	13	11
3	(Romania) E Ionescu (Romania) B Szőcs	11	13	11
Q	(Japan) J Yokotani (Japan) C Muramatsu	4	11	4

Semi-finals
(France) E Dorr (France) J N Yuan	11	11	8	11
3	(Romania) E Ionescu (Romania) B Szőcs	6	5	11	9

=== Bottom half ===
First round
Q	(China) Yuan LC (China) Wang XT	11	8	12	11
(Turkey) A Yigenler (Turkey) E Haraç	6	11	10	3
Q	(Turkey) I Gündüz (South Korea) Yoo S-w	11	5	7	5
4	(Australia) N Lum (Australia) Y Liu	5	11	11	11
(South Korea) Park G-h (South Korea) Joo C-h	7	11	7	11	11
(China) Huang YZ (China) Qin YX	11	8	11	6	7
WC	(Australia) A Sareen (Australia) M Jee	8	4	7
2	(Japan) S Togami (Japan) S Odo	11	11	11

Quarter-finals
Q	(China) Yuan LC (China) Wang XT	3	11	7	11	10
4	(Australia) N Lum (Australia) Y Liu	11	6	11	2	12
(South Korea) Park G-h (South Korea) Joo C-h	4	2	9
2	(Japan) S Togami (Japan) S Odo	11	11	11

Semi-finals
4	(Australia) N Lum (Australia) Y Liu	5	11	10	10
2	(Japan) S Togami (Japan) S Odo	11	6	12	12

Preceded by WTT Contender Istanbul 2026	2026 WTT Series	Succeeded by WTT Finals Hong Kong 2026
