= Table tennis at the 2026 South American Games =

Table tennis competitions at the 2026 South American Games

- Venue: Estadio Salvador Bonilla
- Dates: September 21–26
- Competitors: 57 from 11 nations

Table tennis competitions at the 2026 South American Games in Rosario, Santa Fe, and Rafaela, Argentina, were held between September 21 and 26 at Estadio Salvador Bonilla, located within Parque de la Independencia in Rosario.

A total of 7 events were contested (three men's, three women's and one mixed). The games gave qualifying quotas for the team events from the 2027 Pan American Games table tennis competitions.

== Medal summary ==
=== Medal table ===
* Host nation (Argentina)

| Rank | Nation | Gold | Silver | Bronze | Total |
|---|---|---|---|---|---|
| 1 | Chile | 3 | 2 | 1 | 6 |
| 2 | Argentina* | 2 | 1 | 5 | 8 |
| 3 | Brazil | 1 | 3 | 3 | 7 |
| 4 | Venezuela | 1 | 0 | 2 | 3 |
| 5 | Paraguay | 0 | 1 | 2 | 3 |
| 6 | Colombia | 0 | 0 | 1 | 1 |
| 6 | Ecuador | 0 | 0 | 1 | 1 |
| 6 | Peru | 0 | 0 | 1 | 1 |
| Totals (8 entries) | | 7 | 7 | 16 | 30 |

=== Medalists ===
==== Men ====
| Event | Gold | Silver | Bronze |
|---|---|---|---|
| Singles | Horacio Cifuentes; Argentina | Santiago Lorenzo; Argentina | Marcelo Aguirre; Paraguay |
| Singles | Horacio Cifuentes; Argentina | Santiago Lorenzo; Argentina | Alberto Miño; Colombia |
| Doubles | Santiago Lorenzo; Horacio Cifuentes; Argentina | Nicolás Burgos; Gustavo Gómez; Chile | Iván Pastore; Marcelo Aguirre; Paraguay |
| Doubles | Santiago Lorenzo; Horacio Cifuentes; Argentina | Nicolás Burgos; Gustavo Gómez; Chile | Carlos Fernández; Felipe Duffoo; Peru |
| Team | Felipe Arado; Guilherme Teodoro; Leonardo Iizuka; Brazil | Carlos Fernández; Rodrigo Hidalgo; Felipe Duffoo; Peru | Nicolás Burgos; Gustavo Gómez; Felipe Olivares; Chile |
| Team | Felipe Arado; Guilherme Teodoro; Leonardo Iizuka; Brazil | Carlos Fernández; Rodrigo Hidalgo; Felipe Duffoo; Peru | Francisco Sanchi; Horacio Cifuentes; Santiago Lorenzo; Argentina |

==== Women ====
| Event | Gold | Silver | Bronze |
|---|---|---|---|
| Singles | Daniela Ortega; Chile | Giulia Takahashi; Brazil | Valentina Ríos; Chile |
| Singles | Daniela Ortega; Chile | Giulia Takahashi; Brazil | Beatriz Kanashiro; Brazil |
| Doubles | Camila Obando; Cristina Gómez; Venezuela | Paulina Vega; Daniela Ortega; Chile | Camila Argüelles; Ana Codina; Argentina |
| Doubles | Camila Obando; Cristina Gómez; Venezuela | Paulina Vega; Daniela Ortega; Chile | Ana Isaza; Juliana Lozada; Colombia |
| Team | Daniela Ortega; Valentina Ríos; Paulina Vega; Chile | Beatriz Kanashiro; Giulia Takahashi; Victoria Strassburger; Brazil | Roxy González; Camila Obando; Cristina Gómez; Venezuela |
| Team | Daniela Ortega; Valentina Ríos; Paulina Vega; Chile | Beatriz Kanashiro; Giulia Takahashi; Victoria Strassburger; Brazil | Ana Codina; Candela Molero; Camila Argüelles; Argentina |

==== Mixed ====
| Event | Gold | Silver | Bronze |
|---|---|---|---|
| Doubles | Daniela Ortega; Gustavo Gómez; Chile | Giulia Takahashi; Guilherme Teodoro; Brazil | Camila Argüelles; Santiago Lorenzo; Argentina |
| Doubles | Daniela Ortega; Gustavo Gómez; Chile | Giulia Takahashi; Guilherme Teodoro; Brazil | Leonardo Iizuka; Victória Strassburger; Brazil |

== Participation ==
Twelve nations participated in the table tennis events of the 2026 South American Games.

- Argentina (13)
- Aruba (1)
- Bolivia (9)
- Brazil (10)
- Chile (10)
- Colombia (10)
- Ecuador (10)
- Guyana (7)
- Paraguay (10)
- Peru (6)
- Uruguay (5)
- Venezuela (5)

== Results ==
=== Men's singles ===
Round of 64
L Fuentes (ARG) | 4
J Terrazas (BOL) | 0

Round of 32
H Cifuentes (ARG) | 4
J Robayo (ECU) | 0
R Hidalgo (PER) | 1
S Bedoya (COL) | 4
F Olivares (CHI) | 4
P Palou (URU) | 0
L Fuentes (ARG) | 1
F Arado (BRA) | 4
G Gómez (CHI) | 4
B Villavicencio (ECU) | 2
M Bentancor (ARG) | 1
M Aguirre (PAR) | 4
F Duffoo (PER) | 0
C Arcila (COL) | 4
E Johnson (GUY) | 0
L Iizuka (BRA) | 4
N Burgos (CHI) | 4
F Fernández (BOL) | 0
L Sato (ARG) | 4
I Pastore (PAR) | 2
C Fernández (PER) | 4
D Moleda (URU) | 2
S Britton (GUY) | 0
S Lorenzo (ARG) | 4
E Otalvaro (COL) | 4
M Morinigo (PAR) | 0
S Ressini (BOL) | 0
F Sanchi (ARG) | 4
A Miño (ECU) | 4
S Timbal (URU) | 0
C Wong (GUY) | 0
G Teodoro (BRA) | 4

Round of 16
H Cifuentes (ARG) | 4
S Bedoya (COL) | 1
F Olivares (CHI) | 1
F Arado (BRA) | 4
G Gómez (CHI) | 2
M Aguirre (PAR) | 4
C Arcila (COL) | 4
L Iizuka (BRA) | 3
N Burgos (CHI) | 4
L Sato (ARG) | 0
C Fernández (PER) | 0
S Lorenzo (ARG) | 4
E Otalvaro (COL) | 4
F Sanchi (ARG) | 3
A Miño (ECU) | 4
G Teodoro (BRA) | 1

Quarterfinals
H Cifuentes (ARG) | 4
F Arado (BRA) | 1
M Aguirre (PAR) | 4
C Arcila (COL) | 2
N Burgos (CHI) | 2
S Lorenzo (ARG) | 4
E Otalvaro (COL) | 2
A Miño (ECU) | 4

Semifinals
H Cifuentes (ARG) | 4
M Aguirre (PAR) | 0
S Lorenzo (ARG) | 4
A Miño (ECU) | 2

Final
H Cifuentes (ARG) | 4
S Lorenzo (ARG) | 3

=== Men's doubles ===
Round of 16
E Johnson (GUY); S Britton (GUY) | 1
S Timbal (URU); P Palou (URU) | 3
F Fernández (BOL); J Terrazas (BOL) | 0
A Miño (ECU); J Robayo (ECU) | 3

Quarterfinals
N Burgos (CHI); G Gómez (CHI) | 3
C Arcila (COL); E Otalvaro (COL) | 2
S Timbal (URU); P Palou (URU) | 1
I Pastore (PAR); M Aguirre (PAR) | 3
H Cifuentes (ARG); S Lorenzo (ARG) | 3
A Miño (ECU); J Robayo (ECU) | 0
C Fernández (PER); F Duffoo (PER) | 3
L Iizuka (BRA); G Teodoro (BRA) | 2

Semifinals
N Burgos (CHI); G Gómez (CHI) | 3
I Pastore (PAR); M Aguirre (PAR) | 0
H Cifuentes (ARG); S Lorenzo (ARG) | 3
C Fernández (PER); F Duffoo (PER) | 1

Final
N Burgos (CHI); G Gómez (CHI) | 2
H Cifuentes (ARG); S Lorenzo (ARG) | 3

=== Men's team ===
Quarterfinals
Ecuador | 5
Chile | 8
Peru | 8
Paraguay | 2

Semifinals
Brazil | 8
Chile | 1
Peru | 8
Argentina | 6

Final
Brazil | 8
Peru | 2

=== Women's singles ===
Round of 32
G Giordano (BOL) | 0
R González (VEN) | 4
C Argüelles (ARG) | 4
A Sandoval (PAR) | 0
C Molero (ARG) | 3
N Paredes (ECU) | 4
A Isaza (COL) | 4
F Paiva (PAR) | 0
J Lozada (COL) | 4
N Antar (PAR) | 0
C Edghill (GUY) | 4
A Cárdenas (ECU) | 1
L Rocha (BOL) | 0
C Obando (VEN) | 4
G Campo (COL) | 4
K Maldonado (ECU) | 3

Round of 16
D Ortega (CHI) | 4
R González (VEN) | 1
C Argüelles (ARG) | 1
V Strassburger (BRA) | 4
C Gómez (VEN) | 2
N Paredes (ECU) | 4
A Isaza (COL) | 1
V Ríos (CHI) | 4
P Vega (CHI) | 4
J Lozada (COL) | 0
C Edghill (GUY) | 0
B Kanashiro (BRA) | 4
A Codina (ARG) | 4
C Obando (VEN) | 1
G Campo (COL) | 1
G Takahashi (BRA) | 4

Quarterfinals
D Ortega (CHI) | 4
V Strassburger (BRA) | 1
N Paredes (ECU) | 2
V Ríos (CHI) | 4
P Vega (CHI) | 3
B Kanashiro (BRA) | 4
A Codina (ARG) | 2
G Takahashi (BRA) | 4

Semifinals
D Ortega (CHI) | 4
V Ríos (CHI) | 3
B Kanashiro (BRA) | 2
G Takahashi (BRA) | 4

Final
D Ortega (CHI) | 4
G Takahashi (BRA) | 0

=== Women's doubles ===
Quarterfinals
P Vega (CHI); D Ortega (CHI) | 3
N Paredes (ECU); A Cárdenas (ECU) | 1
F Paiva (PAR); N Antar (PAR) | 0
C Argüelles (ARG); A Codina (ARG) | 3
J Lozada (COL); A Isaza (COL) | W/O
L Rocha (BOL); G Giordano (BOL) | 0
C Obando (VEN); C Gómez (VEN) | 3
V Strassburger (BRA); G Takahashi (BRA) | 0

Semifinals
P Vega (CHI); D Ortega (CHI) | 3
C Argüelles (ARG); A Codina (ARG) | 1
J Lozada (COL); A Isaza (COL) | 1
C Obando (VEN); C Gómez (VEN) | 3

Final
P Vega (CHI); D Ortega (CHI) | 1
C Obando (VEN); C Gómez (VEN) | 3

=== Women's team ===
Semifinals
Brazil | 8
Venezuela | 3
Argentina | 6
Chile | 8

Final
Brazil | 0
Chile | 8

=== Mixed doubles ===
Round of 16
L Rocha (BOL); J Terrazas (BOL) | 0
A Isaza (COL); S Bedoya (COL) | W/O
V Strassburger (BRA); L Iizuka (BRA) | 3
A Sandoval (PAR); I Pastore (PAR) | 0
N Paredes (ECU); A Miño (ECU) | 3
F Sanchi (ARG); A Codina (ARG) | 2
P Vega (CHI); N Burgos (CHI) | 3
G Giordano (BOL); F Fernández (BOL) | 0
C Argüelles (ARG); S Lorenzo (ARG) | 3
S Britton (GUY); C Edghill (GUY) | 0
C Arcila (COL); J Lozada (COL) | 3
M Morinigo (PAR); F Paiva (PAR) | 0
K Maldonado (ECU); B Villavicencio (ECU)
G Teodoro (BRA); G Takahashi (BRA) | 3

Quarterfinals
D Ortega (CHI); G Gómez (CHI) | 3
A Isaza (COL); S Bedoya (COL) | 1
V Strassburger (BRA); L Iizuka (BRA) | 3
N Paredes (ECU); A Miño (ECU) | 1
P Vega (CHI); N Burgos (CHI) | 2
C Argüelles (ARG); S Lorenzo (ARG) | 3
C Arcila (COL); J Lozada (COL) | 2
G Teodoro (BRA); G Takahashi (BRA) | 3

Semifinals
D Ortega (CHI); G Gómez (CHI) | 3
V Strassburger (BRA); L Iizuka (BRA) | 0
C Argüelles (ARG); S Lorenzo (ARG) | 2
G Teodoro (BRA); G Takahashi (BRA) | 3

Final
D Ortega (CHI); G Gómez (CHI) | 3
G Teodoro (BRA); G Takahashi (BRA) | 2
