= 2025 Pan American Table Tennis Championships =

- Date: 12–19 October 2025
- Edition: 8th
- Location: Rock Hill, United States
- Venue: Rock Hill Sports and Event Center
- Pan American Table Tennis Championships

The 2025 Pan American Table Tennis Championships is a table tennis tournament organized by the International Table Tennis Federation (ITTF) and held from 12 to 19 October 25, at Rock Hill Sports and Event Center in Rock Hill, United States. It is the first time the championships take place in the United States.

== Medal table ==
* Host nation (United States)

Rank	Nation	Gold	Silver	Bronze	Total
1	Brazil	3	1	2	6
2	Puerto Rico	2	1	1	4
3	Argentina	1	0	2	3
4	Guatemala	1	0	0	1
5	United States	0	3	2	5
6	Chile	0	1	3	4
6	Mexico	0	1	3	4
8	Canada	0	0	1	1
Totals (8 entries)		7	7	14	28

== Medalists ==
Event	Gold	Silver	Bronze
Men's singles	(Brazil) Hugo Calderano	(United States) Kanak Jha	(Chile) Nicolás Burgos
Men's singles	(Brazil) Hugo Calderano	(United States) Kanak Jha	(Argentina) Horacio Cifuentes
Women's singles	(Puerto Rico) Adriana Díaz	(Brazil) Bruna Takahashi	(Canada) Mo Zhang
Women's singles	(Puerto Rico) Adriana Díaz	(Brazil) Bruna Takahashi	(United States) Lily Zhang
Men's doubles	(Brazil) Leonardo Iizuka (Brazil) Guilherme Teodoro	(Chile) Nicolás Burgos (Chile) Gustavo Gómez	(Argentina) Horacio Cifuentes (Argentina) Santiago Lorenzo
Men's doubles	(Brazil) Leonardo Iizuka (Brazil) Guilherme Teodoro	(Chile) Nicolás Burgos (Chile) Gustavo Gómez	(Mexico) Rogelio Castro (Mexico) Marcos Madrid
Women's doubles	(Guatemala) Lucía Cordero (Guatemala) Hidalynn Zapata	(Mexico) Arantxa Cossio (Mexico) Clio Barcenas	(Chile) Daniela Ortega (Chile) Paulina Vega
Women's doubles	(Guatemala) Lucía Cordero (Guatemala) Hidalynn Zapata	(Mexico) Arantxa Cossio (Mexico) Clio Barcenas	(Puerto Rico) Adriana Díaz (Puerto Rico) Brianna Burgos
Mixed doubles	(Brazil) Hugo Calderano (Brazil) Bruna Takahashi	(Puerto Rico) Steven Moreno (Puerto Rico) Brianna Burgos	(United States) Jishan Liang (United States) Jessica Reyes Lai
Mixed doubles	(Brazil) Hugo Calderano (Brazil) Bruna Takahashi	(Puerto Rico) Steven Moreno (Puerto Rico) Brianna Burgos	(Mexico) Marcos Madrid (Mexico) Clio Barcenas
Men's team	Argentina; Santiago Lorenzo; Horacio Cifuentes; Francisco Sanchi; Martín Betancor	United States; Jishan Liang; Kanak Jha; Sid Naresh; Nandan Naresh	Mexico; Jorge Buenrostro; Axel Lovo; Rogelio Castro; Marcos Madrid
Men's team	Argentina; Santiago Lorenzo; Horacio Cifuentes; Francisco Sanchi; Martín Betancor	United States; Jishan Liang; Kanak Jha; Sid Naresh; Nandan Naresh	Brazil; Guilherme Teodoro; Hugo Calderano; Leonardo Iizuka; Felipe Arado
Women's team	Puerto Rico; Fabiola Díaz; Brianna Burgos; Adriana Díaz; Alondra Rodríguez	United States; Lily Zhang; Sally Moyland; Irene Yeoh; Jessica Reyes Lai	Brazil; Giulia Takahashi; Bruna Takahashi; Laura Watanabe; Victoria Strassburger
Women's team	Puerto Rico; Fabiola Díaz; Brianna Burgos; Adriana Díaz; Alondra Rodríguez	United States; Lily Zhang; Sally Moyland; Irene Yeoh; Jessica Reyes Lai	Chile; Daniela Ortega; Paulina Vega; Valentina Ríos; Zhiying Zeng

== Results ==
=== Men's singles ===
Date: 12–15 October 2025

Round of 64
(Paraguay) M Aguirre	4
(Canada) S Martin	1
(Guatemala) R Gatica	0
(Chile) E Vos	4
(Dominican Republic) R Vila	4
(Puerto Rico) Y López	0
(Dominican Republic) I Vila	4
(Barbados) Tyrese Knight	0
(Puerto Rico) S Moreno	4
(El Salvador) J Galeano	1
(Mexico) J Buenrostro	0
(Brazil) F Arado	4
(Mexico) A Lovo	4
(Trinidad and Tobago) D Douglas	0
(El Salvador) F Alfaro	1
(Canada) Z Wang	4
(Dominican Republic) A Tejada	1
(Chile) J Paredes	4
(Puerto Rico) E Rios	4
(Dominican Republic) R Cabrera	2
(El Salvador) E Sánchez	0
(Argentina) M Betancor	4

Round of 32
(Brazil) H Calderano	4
(El Salvador) D Orantes	0
(Paraguay) M Aguirre	4
(Mexico) R Castro	0
(Argentina) S Lorenzo	1
(Chile) E Vos	4
(Dominican Republic) R Vila	0
(United States) S Naresh	4
(Chile) N Burgos	4
(Dominican Republic) I Vila	2
(Puerto Rico) S Moreno	2
(United States) N Naresh	4
(Argentina) F Sanchi	1
(Brazil) F Arado	4
(Guatemala) I Morales	0
(Canada) E Wang	4
(Argentina) H Cifuentes	4
(Guatemala) L Carrillo	0
(Mexico) A Lovo	0
(Puerto Rico) A Naranjo	4
(United States) J Liang	4
(Canada) Z Wang	0
(Chile) J Paredes	0
(Brazil) L Iizuka	4
(Canada) E Ly	3
(Mexico) M Madrid	4
(Puerto Rico) E Rios	1
(Chile) G Gómez	4
(Brazil) G Teodoro	4
(Argentina) M Betancor	0
(Guatemala) S Carrillo	0
(United States) K Jha	4

Round of 16
(Brazil) H Calderano	4
(Paraguay) M Aguirre	1
(Chile) E Vos	2
(United States) S Naresh	4
(Chile) N Burgos	4
(United States) N Naresh	2
(Brazil) F Arado	4
(Canada) E Wang	2
(Argentina) H Cifuentes	4
(Puerto Rico) A Naranjo	2
(United States) J Liang	2
(Brazil) L Iizuka	4
(Mexico) M Madrid	2
(Chile) G Gómez	4
(Brazil) G Teodoro	2
(United States) K Jha	4

Quarterfinals
(Brazil) H Calderano	4
(United States) S Naresh	1
(Chile) N Burgos	4
(Brazil) F Arado	0
(Argentina) H Cifuentes	4
(Brazil) L Iizuka	2
(Chile) G Gómez	0
(United States) K Jha	4

Semifinals
(Brazil) H Calderano	4
(Chile) N Burgos	2
(Argentina) H Cifuentes	0
(United States) K Jha	4

Final
(Brazil) H Calderano	4
(United States) K Jha	1

=== Women's singles ===
Date: 12–15 October 2025

Round of 64
(Dominican Republic) E Brito	1
(Canada) S Zhang	4
(Chile) V Ríos	4
(Guatemala) J Cux	3
(Trinidad and Tobago) I Edwards-Taylor	1
(Mexico) M Muñoz
(Dominican Republic) E Castro	4
(Brazil) V Strassburger	3
(Mexico) M Aceves	3
(Dominican Republic) Y Ortíz	4
(Ecuador) A Cárdenas	0
(Guatemala) H Zapata	4
(Antigua and Barbuda) S Kashyap	4
(Argentina) V Parola	0
(Ecuador) N Paredes	4
(Canada) J Nie	3
(Dominican Republic) A Estrella	2
(Argentina) C Argüelles	4

Round of 32
(Brazil) B Takahashi	4
(Costa Rica) L Zavaleta	0
(Canada) S Zhang	4
(Ecuador) A Arellano	0
(Puerto Rico) B Burgos	4
(Mexico) C Barcenas	0
(Chile) V Ríos	0
(United States) J Reyes	4
(United States) S Moyland	4
(Mexico) M Muñoz	0
(Guatemala) L Cordero	1
(Argentina) A Codina	4
(Chile) P Vega	4
(Dominican Republic) E Castro	1
(Puerto Rico) F Díaz	0
(Canada) M Zhang	4
(United States) L Zhang	4
(Canada) N Chang	0
(Dominican Republic) Y Ortíz	0
(Puerto Rico) A Rodríguez	4
(Brazil) L Watanabe	4
(Guatemala) H Zapata	3
(Antigua and Barbuda) S Kashyap	0
(Chile) D Ortega	4
(Brazil) G Takahashi	4
(United States) I Yeoh	1
(Ecuador) N Paredes	0
(Chile) Z Zeng	4
(Mexico) A Cossio	4
(Argentina) C Argüelles	2
(Guatemala) M Enríquez	0
(Puerto Rico) A Díaz	4

Round of 16
(Brazil) B Takahashi	4
(Canada) S Zhang	0
(Puerto Rico) B Burgos	2
(United States) J Reyes	4
(United States) S Moyland	4
(Argentina) A Codina	1
(Chile) P Vega	0
(Canada) M Zhang	4
(United States) L Zhang	4
(Puerto Rico) A Rodríguez	0
(Brazil) L Watanabe	2
(Chile) D Ortega	4
(Brazil) G Takahashi	0
(Chile) Z Zeng	4
(Mexico) A Cossio	0
(Puerto Rico) A Díaz	4

Quarterfinals
(Brazil) B Takahashi	4
(United States) J Reyes	1
(United States) S Moyland	1
(Canada) M Zhang	4
(United States) L Zhang	4
(Chile) D Ortega	1
(Chile) Z Zeng	0
(Puerto Rico) A Díaz	4

Semifinals
(Brazil) B Takahashi	4
(Canada) M Zhang	2
(United States) L Zhang	0
(Puerto Rico) A Díaz	4

Final
(Brazil) B Takahashi	0
(Puerto Rico) A Díaz	4

=== Men's doubles ===
Date: 12–15 October 2025

Round of 16
(Puerto Rico) S Moreno (Puerto Rico) A Naranjo	3
(El Salvador) D Orantes (El Salvador) Jaime Galeano	0
(Dominican Republic) I Vila (Dominican Republic) R Vila	1
(Mexico) R Castro (Mexico) M Madrid	3

Quarterfinals
(Argentina) H Cifuentes (Argentina) S Lorenzo	3
(Guatemala) S Carrillo (Guatemala) I Morales	0
(Puerto Rico) S Moreno (Puerto Rico) A Naranjo	0
(Chile) N Burgos (Chile) G Gómez	3
(United States) N Naresh (United States) S Naresh	1
(Mexico) R Castro (Mexico) M Madrid	3
(Canada) E Ly (Canada) E Wang	1
(Brazil) L Iizuka (Brazil) G Teodoro	3

Semifinals
(Argentina) H Cifuentes (Argentina) S Lorenzo	1
(Chile) N Burgos (Chile) G Gómez	3
(Mexico) R Castro (Mexico) M Madrid	2
(Brazil) L Iizuka (Brazil) G Teodoro	3

Final
(Chile) N Burgos (Chile) G Gómez	0
(Brazil) L Iizuka (Brazil) G Teodoro	3

=== Women's doubles ===
Date: 12–15 October 2025

Round of 16
(Ecuador) A Arellano (Ecuador) N Paredes	0
(Dominican Republic) E Castro (Dominican Republic) Y Ortíz	3
(Canada) N Chan (Canada) J Nie	1
(Argentina) A Codina (Argentina) C Argüelles	3

Quarterfinals
(Chile) D Ortega (Chile) P Vega	3
(United States) S Moyland (United States) J Reyes	2
(Dominican Republic) E Castro (Dominican Republic) Y Ortíz	0
(Guatemala) L Cordero (Guatemala) H Zapata	3
(Mexico) A Cossio (Mexico) C Barcenas	3
(Argentina) A Codina (Argentina) C Argüelles	2
(Puerto Rico) A Díaz (Puerto Rico) B Burgos	3
(Brazil) G Takahashi (Brazil) L Watanabe	0

Semifinals
(Chile) D Ortega (Chile) P Vega	0
(Guatemala) L Cordero (Guatemala) H Zapata	3
(Mexico) A Cossio (Mexico) C Barcenas	3
(Puerto Rico) A Díaz (Puerto Rico) B Burgos	2

Final
(Guatemala) L Cordero (Guatemala) H Zapata	3
(Puerto Rico) A Díaz (Puerto Rico) B Burgos	2

=== Mixed doubles ===
Date: 12–14 October 2025

Round of 32
(Canada) E Ly (Canada) M Zhang	3
(Dominican Republic) I Vila (Dominican Republic) E Castro	0
(Trinidad and Tobago) D Douglas (Trinidad and Tobago) I Edwards-Taylor	0
(Canada) S Martin (Canada) N Chan	3
(Guatemala) L Carrillo (Guatemala) H Zapata	0
(Argentina) F Sanchi (Argentina) A Codina	3

Round of 16
(Brazil) H Calderano (Brazil) B Takahashi	3
(Argentina) S Lorenzo (Argentina) C Argüelles	0
(Canada) E Ly (Canada) Mo Zhang	1
(Mexico) R Castro (Mexico) A Cossio	3
(Puerto Rico) A Naranjo (Puerto Rico) A Paz	3
(Guatemala) S Carrilo (Guatemala) L Cordero	0
(United States) J Liang (United States) J Reyes	3
(Chile) G Gómez (Chile) D Ortega	0
(Chile) N Burgos (Chile) P Vega	3
(Dominican Republic) R Vila (Dominican Republic) E Brito	0
(Canada) S Martin (Canada) N Chan	0
(Mexico) M Madrid (Mexico) C Barcenas	3
(United States) N Naresh (United States) S Moyland	3
(Argentina) F Sanchi (Argentina) A Codina	0
(Puerto Rico) S Moreno (Puerto Rico) B Burgos	3
(Brazil) G Teodoro (Brazil) G Takahashi	2

Quarterfinals
(Brazil) H Calderano (Brazil) B Takahashi	3
(Mexico) R Castro (Mexico) A Cossio	0
(Puerto Rico) A Naranjo (Puerto Rico) A Paz	2
(United States) J Liang (United States) J Reyes	3
(Chile) N Burgos (Chile) P Vega	0
(Mexico) M Madrid (Mexico) C Barcenas	3
(United States) N Naresh (United States) S Moyland	2
(Puerto Rico) S Moreno (Puerto Rico) B Burgos	3

Semifinals
(Brazil) H Calderano (Brazil) B Takahashi	3
(United States) J Liang (United States) J Reyes	2
(Mexico) M Madrid (Mexico) C Barcenas	1
(Puerto Rico) S Moreno (Puerto Rico) B Burgos	3

Final
(Brazil) H Calderano (Brazil) B Takahashi	3
(Puerto Rico) S Moreno (Puerto Rico) B Burgos	0

=== Men's teams ===
Date: October 18–19, 2025. The following teams qualified for the knock-outs section after the group stages.

Quarterfinals
Mexico	3
Canada	2
Puerto Rico	1
Brazil	3

Semifinals
Argentina	3
Mexico	2
Brazil	1
United States	3

Final
Argentina	3
United States	2

=== Women's teams ===
Date: October 18–19, 2025. The following teams qualified for the knock-outs section after the group stages.

Quarterfinals
Canada	1
Puerto Rico	3
Mexico	0
Chile	3

Semifinals
Brazil	1
Puerto Rico	3
Chile	0
United States	3

Final
Puerto Rico	3
United States	1
