= 2025 World Table Tennis Championships – Mixed doubles =

Mixed doubles at the 2025 World Table Tennis Championships
- Venue: Lusail Sports Arena; Qatar University Sports Complex
- Location: Doha, Qatar
- Dates: 17–24 May

Medalists
gold medal	Wang Chuqin; Sun Yingsha	China
silver medal	Maharu Yoshimura; Satsuki Odo	Japan
bronze medal	Wong Chun Ting; Doo Hoi Kem	Hong Kong
bronze medal	Lim Jong-hoon; Shin Yu-bin	South Korea

The mixed doubles competition of the 2025 World Table Tennis Championships was held from 17 to 24 May 2025. The event was played as a straight knockout. All doubles' matches were best of 5 games.

China's Wang Chuqin and Sun Yingsha clinched their third consecutive mixed doubles title with a 3–1 victory over Japan's Maharu Yoshimura and Satsuki Odo (11–7, 11–8, 7–11, 11–8) in the final.

== Seeds ==
Doubles events had 16 seeded pairs. Seeding in doubles events was done by combining each player's ITTF Table Tennis Doubles/Mixed Doubles Individual World Ranking position to form a combined pair rank (CPR), based on April 29, 2025 ranking.

1. (China) Lin Shidong / (China) Kuai Man (quarterfinals)
2. (China) Wang Chuqin / (China) Sun Yingsha (champions)
3. (Hong Kong) Wong Chun Ting / (Hong Kong) Doo Hoi Kem (semifinals)
4. (South Korea) Lim Jong-hoon / (South Korea) Shin Yu-bin (semifinals)
5. (Japan) Sora Matsushima / (Japan) Miwa Harimoto (quarterfinals)
6. (Sweden) Kristian Karlsson / (Sweden) Christina Källberg (second round)
7. (Spain) Álvaro Robles / (Spain) María Xiao (quarterfinals)
8. (North Korea) Ri Jong-sik / (North Korea) Kim Kum-yong (third round)
9. (India) Diya Chitale / (India) Manush Shah (second round)
10. (Austria) Robert Gardos / (Austria) Sofia Polcanova (third round)
11. (Brazil) Guilherme Teodoro / (Brazil) Giulia Takahashi (third round)
12. (Romania) Eduard Ionescu / (Romania) Bernadette Szőcs (first round)
13. (Slovakia) Ľubomír Pištej / (Slovakia) Tatiana Kukulkova (third round)
14. (India) Harmeet Desai / (India) Yashaswini Ghorpade (first round)
15. (Romania) Ovidiu Ionescu / (Romania) Elizabeta Samara (third round, withdrew)
16. (Japan) Maharu Yoshimura / (Japan) Satsuki Odo (final)

== Draw ==
The draw took place on 30 April 2025. Players of the same association were separated only in the first round.

=== Key ===
- r = Retired
- w/o = Walkover

=== Finals ===
Semifinals						Final
16	(Japan) Maharu Yoshimura (Japan) Satsuki Odo	11	11	4	11
3	(Hong Kong) Wong Chun Ting (Hong Kong) Doo Hoi Kem	8	1	11	2	16	(Japan) Maharu Yoshimura (Japan) Satsuki Odo	7	8	11	8
4	(South Korea) Lim Jong-hoon (South Korea) Shin Yu-bin	10	6	14		2	(China) Wang Chuqin (China) Sun Yingsha	11	11	7	11
2	(China) Wang Chuqin (China) Sun Yingsha	12	11	16

=== Top half ===
==== Section 1 ====
First round
1	(China) Lin (China) Kuai	11	11	11
(England) Pitchford (Wales) Hursey	7	5	8
(France) Gauzy (France) Pavade	11	8	11	11
(Germany) Franziska (Germany) Kaufmann	8	11	9	7
(Slovakia) Arpas (Slovakia) Balážová	11	2	3	11	5
(Sweden) Falck (Sweden) Bergström	8	11	11	8	11
(Serbia) Levajac (Serbia) Lupulesku	12	10	7
10	(Austria) Gardos (Austria) Polcanova	14	12	11
16	(Japan) Yoshimura (Japan) Odo	11	11	11
(Singapore) Quek (Singapore) Zeng	8	7	7
(Chinese Taipei) Kuo (Chinese Taipei) Huang Y-h	11	7	11	11
(Malaysia) Choong (Malaysia) Lyne	7	11	9	9
(United States) N. Naresh (United States) Moyland	11	11	3	7	14
(Chile) Burgos (Chile) Vega	4	9	11	11	16
(New Zealand) T. Choi (New Zealand) Gear	3	1	5
8	(North Korea) Ri (North Korea) Kim	11	11	11

Second round
1	(China) Lin (China) Kuai	11	11	11
(France) Gauzy (France) Pavade	8	4	3
(Sweden) Falck (Sweden) Bergström	9	3	12	5
10	(Austria) Gardos (Austria) Polcanova	11	11	10	11
16	(Japan) Yoshimura (Japan) Odo	11	11	11
(Chinese Taipei) Kuo (Chinese Taipei) Huang Y-h	3	7	4
(Chile) Burgos (Chile) Vega	3	5	3
8	(North Korea) Ri (North Korea) Kim	11	11	11

Third round
1	(China) Lin (China) Kuai	11	11	11
10	(Austria) Gardos (Austria) Polcanova	2	3	6
16	(Japan) Yoshimura (Japan) Odo	11	12	11
8	(North Korea) Ri (North Korea) Kim	7	10	6

Quarterfinal
1	(China) Lin (China) Kuai	11	5	11	10
16	(Japan) Yoshimura (Japan) Odo	8	11	13	12

==== Section 2 ====
First round
7	(Spain) Robles (Spain) Xiao	11	9	11	11
(Germany) Duda (Germany) Y. Wan	7	11	3	6
(Qatar) Abdulwahhab (Qatar) A. Mohamed	5	6	6
(Thailand) Preechayan (Thailand) Vijitviriyagul	11	11	11
(Cuba) Campos (Cuba) Fonseca	9	10	11	11	11
(Mexico) Madrid (Mexico) Bárcenas	11	12	5	6	4
(Australia) Lum (Canada) Liao	8	11	4	11	6
13	(Slovakia) Pištej (Slovakia) Kukuľková	11	8	11	6	11
11	(Brazil) Teodoro (Brazil) G. Takahashi	11	11	9	11
(Argentina) Sanchi (Argentina) Codina	6	4	11	9
(Spain) Berzosa (Ukraine) Matiunina	11	13	11	13	12
(North Korea) Ham (North Korea) Pyon	5	15	9	15	10
(Algeria) Jellouli (Algeria) Kessaci	11	13	11	11
(Qatar) Korani (Qatar) M. Ali	1	15	5	5
(Singapore) Pang (Singapore) Ser	9	4	11	11	3
3	(Hong Kong) Wong (Hong Kong) Doo	11	11	7	9	11

Second round
7	(Spain) Robles (Spain) Xiao	11	11	11
(Thailand) Preechayan (Thailand) Vijitviriyagul	3	6	9
(Cuba) Campos (Cuba) Fonseca	7	7	9
13	(Slovakia) Pištej (Slovakia) Kukuľková	11	11	11
11	(Brazil) Teodoro (Brazil) G. Takahashi	11	9	11	8	11
(Spain) Berzosa (Ukraine) Matiunina	8	11	9	11	7
(Algeria) Jellouli (Algeria) Kessaci	7	5	11
3	(Hong Kong) Wong (Hong Kong) Doo	11	11	13

Third round
7	(Spain) Robles (Spain) Xiao	11	11	11
13	(Slovakia) Pištej (Slovakia) Kukuľková	6	9	6
11	(Brazil) Teodoro (Brazil) G. Takahashi	9	11	6	2
3	(Hong Kong) Wong (Hong Kong) Doo	11	8	11	11

Quarterfinal
7	(Spain) Robles (Spain) Xiao	1	5	7
3	(Hong Kong) Wong (Hong Kong) Doo	11	11	11

=== Bottom half ===
==== Section 3 ====
First round
4	(South Korea) Lim (South Korea) Shin	11	4	11	11
(Hong Kong) Chan (Hong Kong) Zhu	7	11	5	7
(Nigeria) Omotayo (Nigeria) Ayoola	9	7	11	12	11
(Egypt) M. Helmy (Egypt) Fathy	11	11	6	10	7
(Canada) Ly (Canada) N. Chan	4	9	6
(Poland) Kulczycki (Poland) Wielgos	11	11	11
(France) Poret (France) Hochart	8	6	12	11	12
14	(India) Desai (India) Ghorpade	11	11	10	8	10
9	(India) Chitale (India) Shah	11	11	11
(Algeria) Bouloussa (Algeria) Nasri	2	7	6
(South Korea) Oh (South Korea) Kim N.	11	11	11
(New Zealand) Shu (New Zealand) J. Lam	5	4	6
(Kazakhstan) Kharki (Kazakhstan) Romanovskaya	1	6	3
(Chinese Taipei) Lin Y-j (Chinese Taipei) Cheng	11	11	11
(Ukraine) Limonov (Ukraine) Brateyko	4	7	6
6	(Sweden) Karlsson (Sweden) C. Källberg	11	11	11

Second round
4	(South Korea) Lim (South Korea) Shin	11	11	11
(Nigeria) Omotayo (Nigeria) Ayoola	2	3	4
(Poland) Kulczycki (Poland) Wielgos	11	9	7	11	11
(France) Poret (France) Hochart	9	11	11	5	6
9	(India) Chitale (India) Shah	8	9	2
(South Korea) Oh (South Korea) Kim N.	11	11	11
(Chinese Taipei) Lin Y-j (Chinese Taipei) Cheng	9	11	11	11
6	(Sweden) Karlsson (Sweden) C. Källberg	11	6	6	4

Third round
4	(South Korea) Lim (South Korea) Shin	11	11	11
(Poland) Kulczycki (Poland) Wielgos	4	4	5
(South Korea) Oh (South Korea) Kim N.	4	7	11	9
(Chinese Taipei) Lin Y-j (Chinese Taipei) Cheng	11	11	6	11

Quarterfinal
4	(South Korea) Lim (South Korea) Shin	11	11	6	7	11
(Chinese Taipei) Lin Y-j (Chinese Taipei) Cheng	9	9	11	11	9

==== Section 4 ====
First round
5	(Japan) Matsushima (Japan) M. Harimoto	11	11	11
(Nigeria) Kuti (Nigeria) Ojomu	3	3	4
(Italy) Oyebode (Italy) Monfardini	8	8	10
(Croatia) Ban (Croatia) Arapovic	11	11	12
(Egypt) Abdelaziz (Egypt) Mariam Alhodaby	11	11	11
(Australia) Hwan (Australia) Psihogios	8	4	5
(Italy) Stoyanov (Italy) Piccolin	15	11	13
12	(Romania) E. Ionescu (Romania) Szőcs	13	7	11
15	(Romania) O. Ionescu (Romania) Samara	3	11	8	11	11
(Mexico) Castro (Mexico) Cossio	11	7	11	4	8
(Cuba) Perez (Cuba) Crespo	0	9	6
(Turkey) Gündüz (Turkey) Altinkaya	11	11	11
(Brazil) Calderano (Brazil) B. Takahashi	11	11	11
(Madagascar) Rakotoarimanana (Madagascar) Raharimanana	7	7	6
(United States) Js Liang (United States) A. Wang	8	1	9
2	(China) Wang (China) Sun	11	11	11

Second round
5	(Japan) Matsushima (Japan) M. Harimoto	11	8	11	9	11
(Croatia) Ban (Croatia) Arapovic	8	11	5	11	9
(Egypt) Abdelaziz (Egypt) Mariam Alhodaby	11	6	11	12
(Italy) Stoyanov (Italy) Piccolin	7	11	7	10
15	(Romania) O. Ionescu (Romania) Samara	11	11	5	11
(Turkey) Gündüz (Turkey) Altinkaya	5	6	11	7
(Brazil) Calderano (Brazil) B. Takahashi	2	7	4
2	(China) Wang (China) Sun	11	11	11

Third round
5	(Japan) Matsushima (Japan) M. Harimoto	13	11	11
(Egypt) Abdelaziz (Egypt) Mariam Alhodaby	11	5	4
15	(Romania) O. Ionescu (Romania) Samara
2	(China) Wang (China) Sun	w	/	o

Quarterfinal
5	(Japan) Matsushima (Japan) M. Harimoto	11	9	9	9
2	(China) Wang (China) Sun	6	11	11	11
