= Honoka Hashimoto =

Japanese table tennis player

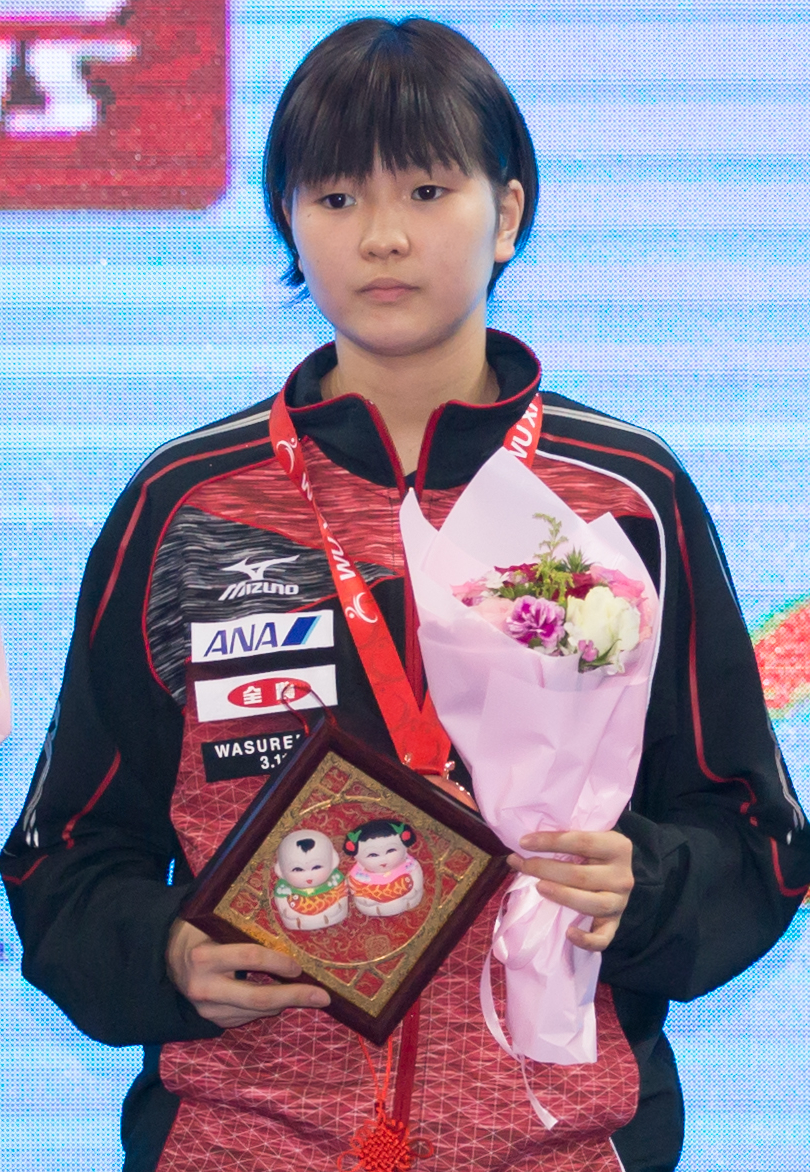
- Hashimoto at the 2017 Asian Championships

Personal information
- Born: 5 July 1998 (age 28) Aichi, Japan
- Height: 163 cm (5 ft 4 in)

Sport
- Sport: Table tennis
- Highest ranking: 10 (28 October 2025)
- Current ranking: 15 (28 September 2026)
Medal record
Women's table tennis
Representing Japan
World Championships
Silver medal – second place	2026 London	Team
Bronze medal – third place	2019 Budapest	Doubles
Asian Championships
Gold medal – first place	2026 Tashkent	Team
Silver medal – second place	2025 Bhubaneswar	Team
Bronze medal – third place	2017 Wuxi	Doubles

Honoka Hashimoto (橋本 帆乃香, Hashimoto Honoka; born 5 July 1998) is a Japanese table tennis player. She won a medal at the 2019 World Table Tennis Championships.

== Finals ==
=== Women's singles ===
Result	Year	Tournament	Opponent	Score	Ref
Runner-up	2017	ITTF Challenge, Belarus Open	(Japan) Hitomi Sato	1–4	
Runner-up	2017	ITTF Challenge, Thailand Open	(Japan) Hitomi Sato	1–4	
Winner	2017	ITTF Challenge, Croatia Open	(Austria) Sofia Polcanova	4–0	
Runner-up	2018	ITTF Challenge, Polish Open	(South Korea) Yang Ha-eun	1–4	
Runner-up	2018	ITTF Challenge, Thailand Open	(China) Liu Shiwen	1–4	
Runner-up	2018	ITTF Challenge, Belgium Open	(Japan) Saki Shibata	0–4	
Runner-up	2019	ITTF Challenge Plus, Portugal Open	(Japan) Hina Hayata	3–4	
Runner-up	2019	ITTF Challenge Plus, Paraguay Open	(Japan) Hina Hayata	2–4	
Winner	2020	ITTF Challenge, Spanish Open	(Monaco) Xiaoxin Yang	4–1	
Runner-up	2022	WTT Feeder European Summer Series	(China) He Zhuojia	2–4	
Runner-up	2024	WTT Star Contender Bangkok	(Japan) Mima Ito	2–4	
Winner	2024	WTT Feeder Olomouc	(China) Yang Yiyun	3–1	
Runner-up	2024	WTT Feeder Panagyurishte	(Japan) Satsuki Odo	1–3	
Runner-up	2025	WTT Star Contender Chennai	(Japan) Miwa Harimoto	2–4	
Winner	2025	WTT Contender Taiyuan	(Macau) Zhu Yuling	4–0	
Winner	2025	WTT Contender Lagos	(India) Sreeja Akula	4–1	
Winner	2025	WTT Contender Almaty	(China) Qin Yuxuan	4–0	
Runner-up	2026	WTT Contender Lagos	(Japan) Satsuki Odo	1–4	
Runner-up	2026	WTT Contender Skopje	(Japan) Satsuki Odo	0–4	
Winner	2026	WTT Contender Istanbul	(South Korea) Joo Cheonhui	4–1	
Winner	2026	WTT Star Contender Muscat	(Japan) Kaho Akae	4–2	

=== Women's doubles ===
Result	Year	Tournament	Partner	Opponent	Score	Ref
Winner	2016	ITTF World Tour, Australian Open	Hitomi Sato	(Australia) Jian Fang Lay / Miao Miao	3–1	
Winner	2016	ITTF World Tour, Belarus Open	Hitomi Sato	(South Korea) Jung Yu-mi / Park Se-ri	3–1	
Winner	2016	ITTF World Tour, Austrian Open	Hitomi Sato	(Japan) Miyu Kato / Hina Hayata	3–2	
Winner	2017	ITTF Challenge, Thailand Open	Hitomi Sato	(Hong Kong) Doo Hoi Kem / Mak Tze Wing	3–0	
Winner	2017	ITTF Challenge, Croatia Open	Hitomi Sato	(Belarus) Nadezhda Bogdanova / Daria Trigolos	3–0	
Runner-up	2017	ITTF World Tour, Austrian Open	Hitomi Sato	(China) Chen Xingtong / Sun Yingsha	2–3	
Winner	2017	ITTF Challenge, Belgium Open	Hitomi Sato	(South Korea) Lee Zi-on / Song Ma-eum	3–2	
Winner	2018	ITTF Challenge, Spanish Open	Hitomi Sato	(Luxembourg) Sarah De Nutte / Ni Xialian	3–0	
Winner	2018	ITTF Challenge, Croatia Open	Hitomi Sato	(Sweden) Matilda Ekholm / (Hungary) Georgina Póta	3–1	
Runner-up	2018	ITTF World Tour, Australian Open	Hitomi Sato	(Japan) Hina Hayata / Mima Ito	0–3	
Runner-up	2019	ITTF Challenge Plus, Oman Open	Hitomi Sato	(Japan) Saki Shibata / Satsuki Odo	1–3	
Runner-up	2019	ITTF Challenge, Croatia Open	Hitomi Sato	(Japan) Miyuu Kihara / Miyu Nagasaki	1–3	
Winner	2019	ITTF Challenge Plus, Paraguay Open	Maki Shiomi	(Puerto Rico) Adriana Díaz / Melanie Díaz	3–1	
Winner	2019	ITTF Challenge, Polish Open	Maki Shiomi	(South Korea) Lee Eun-hye / Shin Yu-bin	3–1	
Winner	2019	ITTF Challenge Plus, Canada Open	Hitomi Sato	(China) Che Xiaoxi / Li Jiayi	3–0	
Runner-up	2020	ITTF Challenge, Spanish Open	Maki Shiomi	(Japan) Saki Shibata / Satsuki Odo	0–3	
Winner	2020	ITTF Challenge Plus, Oman Open	Hitomi Sato	(Singapore) Lin Ye / Zeng Jian	3–0	
Winner	2024	WTT Feeder Cappadocia	Hitomi Sato	(India) Poymantee Baisya / Krittwika Roy	3–0	
Winner	2024	WTT Contender Rio de Janeiro	Hitomi Sato	(Chinese Taipei) Cheng Hsien-tzu / Chien Tung-chuan	3–0	
Winner	2024	WTT Star Contender Bangkok	Hitomi Sato	(South Korea) Shin Yu-bin / Jeon Ji-hee	3–1	
Winner	2024	WTT Feeder Olomouc	Hitomi Sato	(China) Yang Yiyun / Zhu Sibing	3–0	
Winner	2024	WTT Feeder Panagyurishte	Hitomi Sato	(Japan) Satsuki Odo / Sakura Yokoi	3–0	
Runner-up	2024	WTT Feeder Doha	Hitomi Sato	(Japan) Yuna Ojio / Anne Uesawa	1–3	
Winner	2024	WTT Finals	Hitomi Sato	(Japan) Satsuki Odo / Sakura Yokoi	3–0	
Winner	2025	WTT Contender Almaty	Hitomi Sato	(China) Shi Xunyao / Qian Tianyi	3–0	
Runner-up	2026	WTT Star Contender Astana	Adriana Díaz	(Japan) Miu Hirano / Miyuu Kihara	1–3	

=== Mixed doubles ===
Result	Year	Tournament	Partner	Opponent	Score	Ref
Winner	2025	WTT Star Contender Foz do Iguaçu 2025	Satoshi Aida	(India) Manush Shah / Diya Chitale	3–2	
