= Lubomír Jančařík =

Czech table tennis player (born 1987)

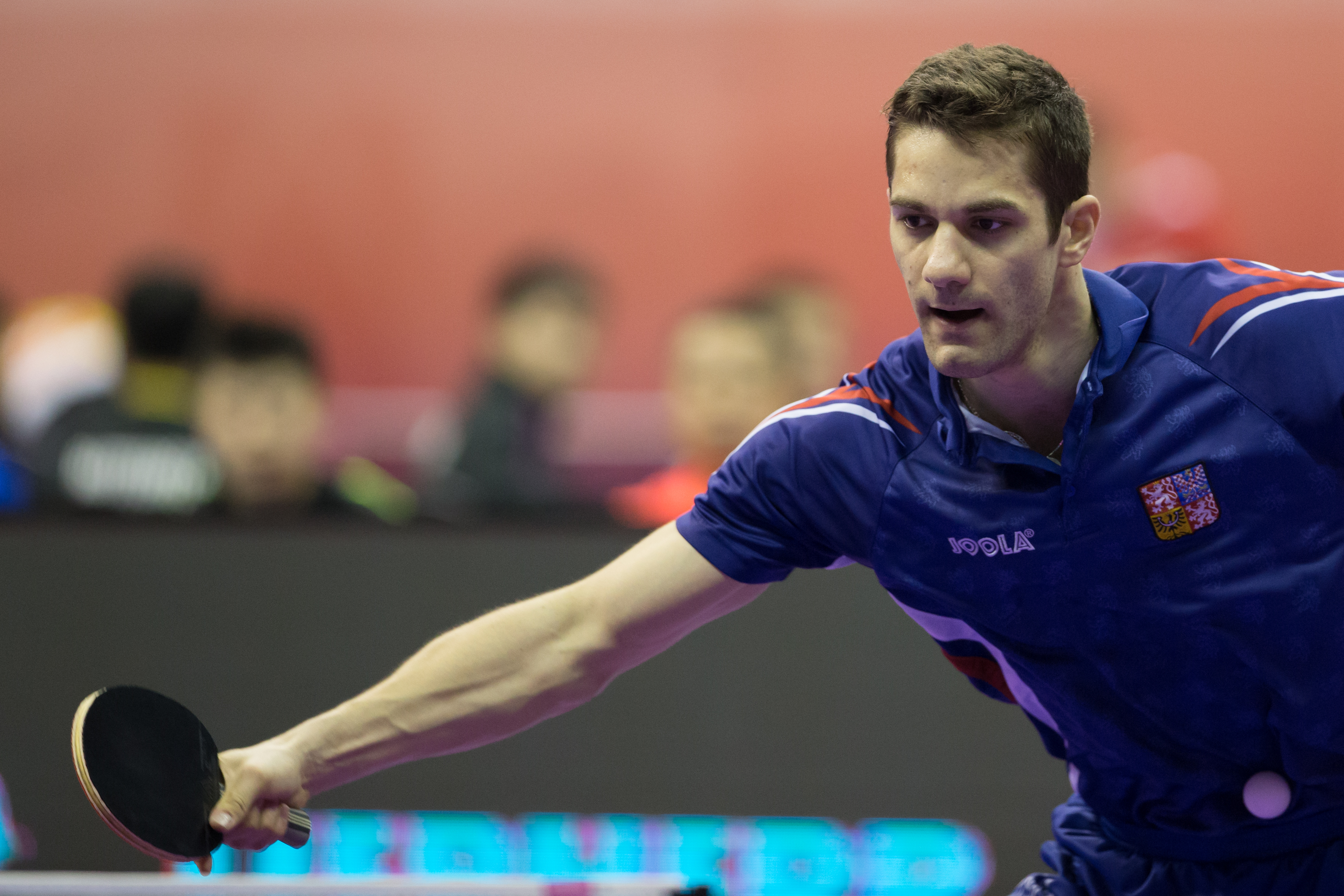
Jančařík in 2016

Lubomír Jančařík (born 17 August 1987 in Hodonín) is a Czech table tennis player. He competed at the 2016 Summer Olympics in the men's singles event, in which he was eliminated in the first round by Zokhid Kenjaev.

He competed in the 2020 Summer Olympics.
