= Audrey Zarif =

French table tennis player

Personal information
- Born: 23 July 1998 (age 28) Saint-Denis, France
- Height: 1.64 m (5 ft 5 in)

Sport
- Sport: Table tennis
- Playing style: Right-handed shakehand
- Highest ranking: 69 (23 January 2024)
- Current ranking: 96 (20 February 2024)
Medal record
Women's table tennis
Representing France
World Championships
Bronze medal – third place	2024 Busan	Team
European Championships
Bronze medal – third place	2021 Warsaw	Team
Bronze medal – third place	2023 Malmö	Team
Mediterranean Games
Bronze medal – third place	2018 Tarragona	Team

Audrey Zarif (born 23 July 1998) is a French table tennis player.

== Career ==
In October 2016, Zarif won the gold medal in the Junior Girls' Singles event at the Europe Youth Top 10 tournament in Prague, defeating Adina Diaconu in the final match to secure the title.

She won French national title in 2023.

At the 2024 Summer Olympics in Paris, Zarif was selected as the alternate (reserve) player for the French women's team. Although she did not compete in the official matches, she trained with the squad throughout the team event where France reached the semifinals.
