= Leonardo Iizuka =

Brazilian table tennis player (born 2006)

Personal information
- Full name: Leonardo Kenzo Iizuka
- Born: 7 April 2006 (age 20) São Caetano do Sul, São Paulo, Brazil

Sport
- Sport: Table tennis
- Highest ranking: 76 (17 June 2025)
- Current ranking: 121 (28 September 2026)
Medal record
Men's table tennis
Representing Brazil
Pan American Championships
Gold medal – first place	2025 Rock Hill	Doubles
Silver medal – second place	2026 Lima	Team
Bronze medal – third place	2024 San Salvador	Singles
Bronze medal – third place	2025 Rock Hill	Team
South American Games
Gold medal – first place	2026 Santa Fe	Team
Bronze medal – third place	2026 Santa Fe	Mixed doubles
World Youth Championships
Bronze medal – third place	2024 Helsingborg	U19 boys' singles
Bronze medal – third place	2024 Helsingborg	U19 boys' doubles
Junior Pan American Games
Gold medal – first place	2025 Asunción	Doubles
Gold medal – first place	2025 Asunción	Team
Silver medal – second place	2025 Asunción	Singles

Leonardo Kenzo Iizuka (born 7 April 2006) is a Brazilian table tennis player. He is a four-time medalist at the Pan American Championships and two-time medalist at the South American Games.

== Career ==
=== 2021 ===
At the end of 2021, at the age of 15, Iizuka competed in his first World Youth Championship.

=== 2024 ===
In May 2024, at the WTT Contender in Rio de Janeiro, Iizuka reached the round of 16.

At the 2024 Summer Olympics, he was part of the Brazilian team as an alternate.

In October 2024, at the Pan American Table Tennis Championships, in the singles event, Iizuka reached the semifinals, winning a bronze medal.

In November 2024, at the World Youth Championships held in Helsingborg, Sweden, Iizuka won two medals in the U19 category, in both singles and doubles, becoming the first Brazilian to win a medal in the World Youth Championships.

=== 2025 ===
In May 2025, at the World Table Tennis Championships held in Doha, Qatar, Iizuka won his first World Championship match by defeating Olajide Omotayo in the first round before losing to Wang Chuqin in the next round.

At the WTT Star Contender in Foz do Iguaçu, Iizuka had a great result in men's doubles, playing with Guilherme Teodoro, in which they reached the semifinals of the tournament.

At the 2025 Junior Pan American Games, Iizuka won the silver medal in singles and a gold medal in doubles and team, the latter two with Felipe Arado.

In October 2025, at the Pan American Table Tennis Championships, Iizuka won a gold medal in men's doubles alongside Teodoro, as well as a bronze medal in the team event.

=== 2026 ===
At the 2026 South American Games, Iizuka won a bronze medal in mixed doubles alongside Victória Strassburger and a gold medal in the team event.

At the 2026 Pan American Table Tennis Championships he secured a silver medal in the Team event.
