= Guilherme Teodoro =

Brazilian table tennis player (born 2001)

Personal information
- Full name: Guilherme da Costa Teodoro
- Born: 3 December 2001 (age 24) Santos, São Paulo, Brazil

Sport
- Sport: Table tennis
- Highest ranking: 56 (26 October 2026)
- Current ranking: 56
Medal record
Men's table tennis
Representing Brazil
Pan American Championships
Gold medal – first place	2022 Santiago	Team
Gold medal – first place	2023 Havana	Team
Gold medal – first place	2024 San Salvador	Mixed doubles
Gold medal – first place	2025 Rock Hill	Doubles
Silver medal – second place	2026 Lima	Singles
Silver medal – second place	2026 Lima	Mixed doubles
Silver medal – second place	2026 Lima	Team
Bronze medal – third place	2024 San Salvador	Doubles
Bronze medal – third place	2025 Rock Hill	Team
South American Games
Gold medal – first place	2026 Santa Fe	Team
Silver medal – second place	2022 Asunción	Team
Silver medal – second place	2026 Santa Fe	Mixed doubles

Guilherme da Costa Teodoro (born 3 December 2001) is a Brazilian table tennis player. At the Pan American Championships, he was the singles runner-up in 2026, in addition to winning eight other medals. He is also a three-time medalist at the South American Games. He competed in the 2024 Summer Olympics for Brazil.

== Career ==
=== 2018–22 ===
Teodoro competed at the 2018 Summer Youth Olympics in the boys' singles.

At the 2022 South American Games, Teodoro won a silver medal in the team event. In November 2022, at the 2022 Pan American Table Tennis Championships, he won a gold medal in the team event, alongside Hugo Calderano, Eric Jouty and Vitor Ishiy.

=== 2023 ===
In August 2023, Teodoro achieved a great result at the WTT Contender in Rio de Janeiro. Playing mixed doubles together with Giulia Takahashi, they reached the semifinals of the competition, winning the bronze medal.

In September 2023, at the 2023 Pan American Table Tennis Championships, Teodoro won a gold medal in the team event, alongside Calderano, Jouty and Ishiy.

=== 2024 ===
In February 2024, at the World Team Table Tennis Championships, Teodoro reached the round of 16, playing with Ishiy and Carlos Ishida.

Also in 2024, Teodoro formed a permanent duo with Ishiy. They reached the round of 16 of the Singapore Smash and the Saudi Smash. At the WTT Contender in Rio de Janeiro, they reached the semifinals together, obtaining the bronze medal. At the WTT Contender in Mendoza, Argentina, they reached the final, obtaining the silver medal, and reaching the position of 16th best pair in the world.

At the 2024 Summer Olympics, Teodoro was part of the Brazilian squad that competed in the men's team event and reached the quarterfinals.

In October 2024, at the Pan American Table Tennis Championships, Teodoro won gold in mixed doubles alongside Takahashi. He also won a bronze medal in doubles with Ishiy, while in the singles event, he reached the quarterfinals.

=== 2025 ===
In April 2025, Takahashi and Teodoro reached the semifinals at the WTT Contender in Tunis, Tunisia. In May 2025, they became the 14th best mixed doubles team in the world in the ITTF rankings.

At the 2025 World Table Tennis Championships, in the mixed doubles bracket, Takahashi and Teodoro defeated the Argentine duo Francisco Sanchi and Ana Codina in the 1st round by 3 sets to 1, and in the 2nd round the duo formed by the Spaniard Daniel Barboza and the Ukrainian Veronika Matiunina by 3 sets to 2, reaching the round of 16, where they would face the tournament's 3rd seed, Wong Chun Ting and Doo Hoi Kem, from Hong Kong. In the singles draw, Teodoro was drawn to face No. 26 seed Kanak Jha, where he played a great match, but was eliminated 4 sets to 3. In the doubles draw, he and Ishiy lost in the first round to Balázs Lei and Samuel Arpas 3 sets to 0.

In July 2025, Teodoro participated in the Las Vegas Grand Smash, where he reached the quarterfinals in mixed doubles, along with Takahashi. As a result, they became the 12th best mixed doubles team in the world according to the ITTF ranking.

At the WTT Star Contender in Foz do Iguaçu, Teodoro had a great result in men's doubles, playing with Leonardo Iizuka, in which they reached the semifinals of the tournament.

In October 2025, at the Pan American Table Tennis Championships, Teodoro won a gold medal in men's doubles alongside Iizuka, as well as a bronze medal in the team event.

=== 2026 ===
At the 2026 South American Games, Teodoro won a gold medal in mixed doubles alongside Takahashi and a bronze medal in the team event.

At the 2026 Pan American Table Tennis Championships he reached the singles final, losing only to Hugo Calderano, and finishing as the runner-up. He also won silver in mixed doubles, together with Giulia Takahashi, and secured a third silver medal in the Team event. As a result, he climbed to the No. 56 position in the world rankings.
