= Giulia Takahashi =

Brazilian table tennis player

Personal information
- Born: 2 April 2005 (age 21) São Paulo, São Paulo, Brazil

Sport
- Sport: Table tennis
- Highest ranking: 73 (10 Jun 2025)
- Current ranking: 77 (15 July 2025)
Medal record
Women's table tennis
Representing Brazil
Pan American Games
Silver medal – second place	2023 Santiago	Doubles
Bronze medal – third place	2023 Santiago	Team
Pan American Championships
Gold medal – first place	2022 Santiago	Team
Gold medal – first place	2024 San Salvador	Doubles
Gold medal – first place	2024 San Salvador	Mixed doubles
Silver medal – second place	2023 Havana	Team
Bronze medal – third place	2023 Havana	Doubles
Bronze medal – third place	2024 San Salvador	Singles
Bronze medal – third place	2025 Rock Hill	Team
South American Youth Games
Gold medal – first place	2022 Rosario	Singles
Gold medal – first place	2022 Rosario	Mixed team

Giulia Yuri Takahashi (born 2 April 2005) is a Brazilian table tennis player. She represented Brazil at the Summer Olympics in 2024. Her sister Bruna Takahashi also plays table tennis.

== Career ==
At the age of 16, she participated as a reserve for the Brazilian women's table tennis team at the 2020 Summer Olympics.

In August 2023, Giulia achieved a great result at the WTT Contender in Rio de Janeiro. Playing mixed doubles together with Guilherme Teodoro, they reached the semifinals of the competition, winning the bronze medal.

In September 2023, Giulia participated in the 2023 Pan American Table Tennis Championships, held in Havana, Cuba. Giulia and her sister Bruna won bronze in doubles. In addition, the Brazilian team won the silver medal, as well as qualifying for the 2024 Olympics in Paris.

At the 2023 Pan American Games, held in October and November in Santiago, Chile, Giulia Takahashi participated in the doubles event, along with her sister, where they reached the final, losing 4 sets to 3 and winning the silver medal. This was Brazil's best result at the Pan American Games in the women's doubles table tennis event. Giulia also won a bronze medal for the Brazilian team.

In November 2023, Giulia entered the world's top 100 in singles for the first time.

In February 2024, she reached the world's No. 77 in singles.

At the 2024 World Team Table Tennis Championships, the Brazilian team reached the round of 16 of the tournament for the first time, where they were eliminated by South Korea by 3 games to 1.

In March 2024, Giulia participated in the Singapore Smash, playing doubles with her sister Bruna, where they were eliminated in the 1st round.

At the 2024 WTT Contender in Rio de Janeiro, she reached the doubles semifinals, with her sister Bruna Takahashi.

At the 2024 Olympic Games, she participated in the singles bracket, facing world champion and Olympic runner-up Sun Yingsha in the 1st round, being eliminated in straight sets.

Giulia, playing with Henrique Noguti, was the mixed doubles champion at the WTT Contender in Lima, in August 2024.

At the 2024 Pan American Table Tennis Championships, she was the bronze medalist in singles, and won gold in doubles and mixed doubles.

Giulia and Guilherme Teodoro reached the semifinals at the WTT Contender in Tunis, Tunisia. In May 2025, they became the 14th best mixed doubles team in the world in the ITTF rankings.

At the 2025 World Table Tennis Championships, she achieved her first World Championship victory against Nigerian Hope Udoaka. In the second round, she would face the best player in Africa at the moment, Egyptian Hana Goda, number 25 in the world, where she started the game by winning the first set, but was later eliminated 4-1. In the mixed doubles bracket, she and Guilherme Teodoro defeated the Argentine duo Francisco Sanchi and Ana Codina in the 1st round by 3 sets to 1, and in the 2nd round the duo formed by the Spaniard Daniel Barboza and the Ukrainian Veronika Matiunina by 3 sets to 2, reaching the round of 16, where they would face the tournament's 3rd seed, Wong Chun Ting and Doo Hoi Kem, from Hong Kong.

== Titles ==
2023 Pan American Games - Bronze medal (team)

Wtt Contender Lima 2024 - Winner (Mixed Doubles with Henrique Noguti)

2024 Pan American Games - Bronze medal (Singles)

2024 Pan American Games - Gold medal (Mixed Doubles with Guilherme Teodoro)

2024 Pan American Games - Gold medal (Doubles with Laura Watanabe)
