= Football at the 2014 Summer Youth Olympics – Boys' tournament =

2014 Boys' Youth Olympic Football Tournament

Tournament details
- Host country: China
- Dates: 15–27 August 2014 (12 days)
- Teams: 6 (from 6 confederations)
- Venue: 1 (in 1 host city)

Final positions
- Champions: Peru (1st title)
- Runners-up: South Korea
- Third place: Iceland
- Fourth place: Cape Verde

Tournament statistics
- Matches played: 11
- Goals scored: 52 (4.73 per match)
- Attendance: 116,572 (10,597 per match)
- Top scorer(s): (Iceland) Helgi Gudjonsson (South Korea) Kim Gyuhyeong (5 goals)
- Fair play award: South Korea

The boys' football tournament at the 2014 Summer Youth Olympics took place at the Jiangning Sports Center, located in Nanjing, China, between 15 and 27 August 2014.

Each match lasted 80 minutes, consisting of two periods of 40 minutes, with an interval of 15 minutes.

== Participating teams ==
One team from each continental confederation participated in the tournament. The same country may not participate in both the boys' and girls' tournament. As hosts, China was given Asia's spot to compete in the girls' tournament (and thus could not participate in the boys' tournament). Invited teams were decided by FIFA during their meeting in Zürich on 3–4 October 2013. Teams may qualify through preliminary competitions, or be nominated for participation by their confederation, with the invited teams ratified by FIFA during their meeting in Zürich on 3–4 October 2013.

Confederation	Team	Qualification method
Africa (CAF)	Cape Verde	Invited
Asia (AFC)	South Korea	2013 Asian Youth Games (Nanjing, China, 13–23 August 2013)
Europe (UEFA)	Iceland	Four-team Youth Olympic qualifying tournament (Nyon, Switzerland, 19–21 October 2013)
North America (CONCACAF)	Honduras	2013 CONCACAF Under-15 Championship (Cayman Islands, 13–25 August 2013)
Oceania (OFC)	Vanuatu	Invited
South America (CONMEBOL)	Peru	2013 South American Under-15 Championship (Bolivia, 16–30 November 2013)

== Squads ==
Players must be 15 years old (born between 1 January and 31 December 1999) to be eligible to participate. Each team consisted of 18 players (two of whom must be goalkeepers).

== Match officials ==
A total of six referees and twelve assistant referees were appointed by FIFA for the tournament.

Confederation	Referees	Assistant referees
AFC	(China) Fu Ming	(China) Ma Ji (China) Cao Yi
CAF	(Senegal) Maguette Ndiaye	(Angola) Jerson Emiliano Dos Santos (Cameroon) Elvis Guy Noupue Nguegoue
CONCACAF	(Costa Rica) Ricardo Montero	(Guatemala) Marco Tulio Diaz Mijangos (El Salvador) Geovany Garcia Lima
CONMEBOL	(Uruguay) Daniel Fedorczuk	(Bolivia) Javier Bustillos (Venezuela) Luis Alfredo Murillo Uribe
OFC	(France) Abdelkader Zitouni^{†}	(France) Paul Ahupu^{†} (Cook Islands) Terry Piri
UEFA	(Switzerland) Sascha Amhof	(Switzerland) Remy Zgraggen (Switzerland) Alain Heiniger

^{†} Abdelkader Zitouni and Paul Ahupu are affiliated with the Football Association of Tahiti (French Polynesia). Since Tahiti is not a member of the IOC, they are listed by the IOC under France.

== Group stage ==
The draw was held at the Hilton Hotel in Nanjing on 14 May 2014. The winners and runners-up of each group advance to the semi-finals. The rankings of teams in each group are determined as follows:

1. points obtained in all group matches;
2. goal difference in all group matches;
3. number of goals scored in all group matches;

If two or more teams are equal on the basis of the above three criteria, their rankings are determined as follows:

1. points obtained in the group matches between the teams concerned;
2. goal difference in the group matches between the teams concerned;
3. number of goals scored in the group matches between the teams concerned;
4. drawing of lots by the FIFA Organising Committee.

Key to colours in group tables
Group winners and runners-up advance to the Semi-finals
Third-placed teams play in the Fifth place match

All times are local: Nanjing in China Standard Time (UTC+8)

=== Group C ===
Team	Pld	W	D	L	GF	GA	GD	Pts
Peru	2	2	0	0	5	2	+3	6
Iceland	2	1	0	1	6	2	+4	3
Honduras	2	0	0	2	1	8	−7	0

15 August 2014
18:00

Honduras	0–5	Iceland
	Report	Kolbeinn Finnsson 15' (pen.); Aron Kari Adalsteinsson 40+1'; Helgi Gudjonsson 41', 59', 73'

Jiangning Sports Center, Nanjing
Attendance: 8,312
Referee: Abdelkader Zitouni (France)

18 August 2014
18:00

Iceland	1–2	Peru
Torfi Gunnarsson 42'	Report	Kristinsson 4' (o.g.); Távara 26'

Jiangning Sports Center, Nanjing
Attendance: 9,653
Referee: Fu Ming (China)

21 August 2014
18:00

Peru	3–1	Honduras
Franklin Gil 34' (pen.); Christopher Olivares 37' (pen.); Quilian Meléndez 74'	Report	Alex Laureano 77'

Jiangning Sports Center, Nanjing
Attendance: 8,466
Referee: Maguette N'Diaye (Senegal)

=== Group D ===
Team	Pld	W	D	L	GF	GA	GD	Pts
South Korea	2	2	0	0	14	0	+14	6
Cape Verde	2	1	0	1	7	6	+1	3
Vanuatu	2	0	0	2	1	16	−15	0

15 August 2014
20:45

Cape Verde	0–5	South Korea
	Report	Kim Gyuhyeong 4'; Jeong Woo-yeong 23' (pen.); Joo Hwimin 36', 69'; Kim Seongjun 59'

Jiangning Sports Center, Nanjing
Attendance: 8,312
Referee: Daniel Fedorczuk (Uruguay)

18 August 2014
20:45

South Korea	9–0	Vanuatu
Jeong Woo-yeong 10'; Kim Gyuhyeong 14', 26', 31', 59'; Benson Rarua 53' (o.g.); Lee Jiyong 62', 68', 80+1'	Report

Jiangning Sports Center, Nanjing
Attendance: 9,653
Referee: Ricardo Montero (Costa Rica)

21 August 2014
20:45

Vanuatu	1–7	Cape Verde
Jules Bororoa 11'	Report	Kenny Nascimento Gomes 2'; Andradino Moniz Garcia 6' (pen.), 72'; Ricardo da Luz Fortes 8', 19', 58'; Kelvin Delgado Medina 67'

Jiangning Sports Center, Nanjing
Attendance: 8,466
Referee: Sascha Amhof (Switzerland)

== Knockout stage ==
In the knockout stages, if a match is level at the end of normal playing time, the match is determined by a penalty shoot-out (no extra time is played).

=== Semi-finals ===
24 August 2014
18:00

Peru	3–1	Cape Verde
Franklin Gil 49' (pen.); Fabio Ramos de Brito 57' (o.g.); Fernando Pacheco 63'	Report	Andradino Moniz Garcia 2'

Jiangning Sports Center, Nanjing
Attendance: 12,201
Referee: Ricardo Montero (Costa Rica)

24 August 2014
20:45

South Korea	1–1	Iceland
Joo Hwimin 63'	Report	Helgi Gudjonsson 60'
Penalties
Lee Sangsu (penalty scored); Joo Hwimin (penalty scored); Kim Mingyu (penalty scored)	3–1	(penalty missed) Kolbeinn Finnsson; (penalty missed) Alex Þór Hauksson; (penalty scored) Helgi Gudjonsson; (penalty missed) Torfi Gunnarsson

Jiangning Sports Center, Nanjing
Attendance: 12,201
Referee: Daniel Fedorczuk (Uruguay)

=== Fifth place match ===
25 August 2014
20:45

Honduras	5–0	Vanuatu
Darwin Diego 2'; Alex Laureano 15'; Mikel Santos 21', 40+1', 64'	Report

Jiangning Sports Center, Nanjing
Attendance: 8,102
Referee: Abdelkader Zitouni (France)

=== Bronze medal match ===
27 August 2014
18:00

Cape Verde	0–4	Iceland
	Report	Kolbeinn Finnsson 14' (pen.); Torfi Gunnarsson 40'; Fabio Ramos de Brito 42' (o.g.); Helgi Gudjonsson 61'

Jiangning Sports Center, Nanjing
Attendance: 15,603
Referee: Fu Ming (China)

=== Gold medal match ===
27 August 2014
20:45

Peru	2–1	South Korea
Franklin Gil 41'; Fernando Pacheco 55'	Report	Jeong Woo-yeong 16'

Jiangning Sports Center, Nanjing
Attendance: 15,603
Referee: Sascha Amhof (Switzerland)

== Final ranking ==
Rank	Team
1st place, gold medalist(s)	Peru
2nd place, silver medalist(s)	South Korea
3rd place, bronze medalist(s)	Iceland
4	Cape Verde
5	Honduras
6	Vanuatu

== Goalscorers ==
5 goals

- (Iceland) Helgi Gudjonsson
- (South Korea) Kim Gyuhyeong

3 goals

- (Cape Verde) Andradino Moniz Garcia
- (Cape Verde) Ricardo da Luz Fortes
- (Honduras) Mikel Santos
- (Peru) Franklin Gil
- (South Korea) Jeong Woo-yeong
- (South Korea) Joo Hwimin
- (South Korea) Lee Jiyong

2 goals

- (Honduras) Alex Laureano
- (Iceland) Kolbeinn Finnsson
- (Iceland) Torfi Gunnarsson
- (Peru) Fernando Pacheco

1 goal

- (Cape Verde) Kelvin Delgado Medina
- (Cape Verde) Kenny Nascimento Gomes
- (Honduras) Darwin Diego
- (Iceland) Aron Kari Adalsteinsson
- (Peru) Quilian Meléndez
- (Peru) Christopher Olivares
- (Peru) Gerald Távara
- (South Korea) Kim Seongjun
- (Vanuatu) Jules Bororoa

2 own goals

- (Cape Verde) Fabio Ramos de Brito (playing against Iceland and Peru)

1 own goal

- (Iceland) Kristófer Kristinsson (playing against Peru)
- (Vanuatu) Benson Rarua (playing against South Korea)
