= Football at the 2014 Summer Youth Olympics =

Tournament details
- Host country: China
- Dates: 14–27 August
- Teams: 6 (boys) + 6 (girls) (from 6 confederations)
- Venue: 2 (in 1 host city)

Final positions
- Champions: Peru (boys); China (girls)
- Runners-up: South Korea (boys); Venezuela (girls)
- Third place: Iceland (boys); Mexico (girls)
- Fourth place: Cape Verde (boys); Slovakia (girls)

The football competition at the 2014 Summer Youth Olympics took place at the Wutaishan Stadium and the Jiangning Sports Center, both located in Nanjing, China, between 14–27 August 2014. There were two tournaments, one for boys and one for girls. Players must be 15 years old (born between 1 January and 31 December 1999) to be eligible to participate.

Each match lasted 80 minutes, consisting of two periods of 40 minutes, with an interval of 15 minutes.

== Venues ==
Nanjing
Jiangning Sports Center Stadium	Wutaishan Stadium
Capacity: 30,000	Capacity: 22,000
Football at the 2014 Summer Youth Olympics is located in China

== Participating teams ==
One team from each continental confederation participated in each tournament. The same country may not participate in both the boys' and girls' tournament. As hosts, China was given Asia's spot to compete in the girls' tournament (and thus could not participate in the boys' tournament). Teams may qualify through preliminary competitions, or be nominated for participation by their confederation, with the invited teams ratified by FIFA during their meeting in Zürich on 3–4 October 2013.

Confederation	Boys'	Girls'
Africa (CAF)	Cape Verde	Namibia
Asia (AFC)	South Korea	China
Europe (UEFA)	Iceland	Slovakia
North America (CONCACAF)	Honduras	Mexico
Oceania (OFC)	Vanuatu	Papua New Guinea
South America (CONMEBOL)	Peru	Venezuela

== Schedule ==
On each day two matches were played.

All times are CST (UTC+8)

Event date	Event day	Starting time	Event details
August 14	Thursday	18:00	Girls' Group Stage
August 15	Friday	18:00	Boys' Group Stage
August 17	Sunday	18:00	Girls' Group Stage
August 18	Monday	18:00	Boys' Group Stage
August 20	Wednesday	18:00	Girls' Group Stage
August 21	Thursday	18:00	Boys' Group Stage
August 23	Saturday	18:00	Girls' Semifinals
August 24	Sunday	18:00	Boys' Semifinals
August 25	Monday	18:00	5th Place Matches
August 26	Tuesday	18:00	Girls' Medal Matches
August 27	Wednesday	18:00	Boys' Medal Matches

== Medal summary ==
Rank	Nation	Gold	Silver	Bronze	Total
1	China	1	0	0	1
1	Peru	1	0	0	1
3	South Korea	0	1	0	1
3	Venezuela	0	1	0	1
5	Iceland	0	0	1	1
5	Mexico	0	0	1	1
Totals (6 entries)		2	2	2	6

Event	Gold	Silver	Bronze
Boys'	Peru	South Korea	Iceland
Girls'	China	Venezuela	Mexico
