= Peru at the 2014 Summer Youth Olympics =

- IOC code: PER
- NOC: Comité Olímpico Peruano
- Website: www.coperu.org (in Spanish)

in Nanjing
- Competitors: 40 in 12 sports
- Medals Ranked 47th: Gold 1 Silver 0 Bronze 1 Total 2

Summer Youth Olympics appearances
- 2010; 2014; 2018; 2026

Peru competed at the 2014 Summer Youth Olympics, in Nanjing, China from 16 August to 28 August 2014.

== Athletics ==
Peru qualified five athletes based on the 31 May 2014 South American Championships The Peruvian flag bearer was César Augusto Rodríguez Diburga (Athletics).

Qualification Legend: Q=Final A (medal); qB=Final B (non-medal); qC=Final C (non-medal); qD=Final D (non-medal); qE=Final E (non-medal)

Boys
Track & road events

Athlete	Event	Final	
Athlete	Event	Result	Rank
César Rodríguez	10 km walk	42:26.49	4

Field Events

Athlete	Event	Qualification		Final	
Athlete	Event	Distance	Rank	Distance	Rank
Josué Gutiérrez	Pole vault	NM qB		4.50	5

Girls
Track & road events

Athlete	Event	Heats		Final	
Athlete	Event	Result	Rank	Result	Rank
Judith Huaman	3000 m	10:26.57	16 qB	10:25.57	6
Steffi Murillo	100 m hurdles	14.06	12 qB	14.25	2
Luz Karen Olivera	2000 m steeplechase	7:07.21	10 qB	7:05.32	3

== Badminton ==
Peru qualified one athlete based on the 2 May 2014 BWF Junior World Rankings.

Singles

Athlete	Event	Group stage				Quarterfinal	Semifinal	Final / BM	Rank
Athlete	Event	Opposition Score	Opposition Score	Opposition Score	Rank	Opposition Score	Opposition Score	Opposition Score	Rank
Daniela Macias	Girls' Singles	Solis (MEX); L 0-2	Azurmendi (ESP); L 0-2	Doha (EGY); W 2-0	3	Did not advance			

Doubles

Athlete	Event	Group stage				Quarterfinal	Semifinal	Final / BM	Rank
Athlete	Event	Opposition Score	Opposition Score	Opposition Score	Rank	Opposition Score	Opposition Score	Opposition Score	Rank
Daniela Macias (PER); Tanguy Citron (FRA)	Mixed Doubles	Lin (CHN); Kim (KOR); L 1-2	Cheam (MAS); Ng (HKG); L 0-2	Gnedt (AUT); Solis (MEX); L 1-2	4	Did not advance			

== Beach volleyball ==
Peru boys' pair qualified based on the Ranking of the South American Youth Beach volleyball Tour.

Athletes	Event	Preliminary round	Standing	Round of 24	Round of 16	Quarterfinals	Semifinals	Final / BM	Rank
Athletes	Event	Opposition Score	Standing	Opposition Score	Opposition Score	Opposition Score	Opposition Score	Opposition Score	Rank
Luis Bramont; Jimy Heredia	Boys'	Rosa – Sweeney (ISV); W 2 - 0	Q	Lanci – Wanderley (BRA); L	Did not advance				25
Luis Bramont; Jimy Heredia	Boys'	Sahneh – Shobeiri (IRI); W 2 - 1	Q	Lanci – Wanderley (BRA); L	Did not advance				25
Luis Bramont; Jimy Heredia	Boys'	Figueroa – Rivera (PUR)	Q	Lanci – Wanderley (BRA); L	Did not advance				25
Luis Bramont; Jimy Heredia	Boys'	Amissah – Tetteh (GHA); L 1 - 2	Q	Lanci – Wanderley (BRA); L	Did not advance				25
Luis Bramont; Jimy Heredia	Boys'	Gauthier – Loiseau (FRA)	Q	Lanci – Wanderley (BRA); L	Did not advance				25

== Football ==
Peru qualified 1 boys' team by virtue of winning the 2013 South American Under-15 Football Championship.

=== Boys' Tournament ===
Roster

- Rodolfo Angeles
- Fabrian Caytuiro
- Ray Contreras
- Ivan Cruz
- Franklin Gil
- Carlos Huerto
- José Inga
- Quilian Meléndez
- Alessandro Milesi
- Christopher Olivares
- Fernando Pacheco
- Anthony Quijano
- Ismael Quispe
- Fabio Rojas
- Christian Sanchez
- Marco Saravia
- Martín Távara
- Brayan Velarde

Group stage

Team	Pld	W	D	L	GF	GA	GD	Pts
Peru	2	2	0	0	5	2	+3	6
Iceland	2	1	0	1	6	2	+4	3
Honduras	2	0	0	2	1	8	−7	0

18 August 2014
18:00

Iceland	1–2	Peru
Gunnarsson 42'	Report	4' Kristinsson (o.g.); 26' Távara

Jiangning Sports Center, Nanjing
Referee: Ming Fu (China)

21 August 2014
18:00

Peru	3–1	Honduras
Gil 34'; Olivares 37'; Meléndez 74'	Report	77' Laureano

Jiangning Sports Center, Nanjing
Referee: Maguette N'Diaye (Senegal)

Semi-final

24 August 2014
18:00

Peru	3–1	Cape Verde
Gil 49'; Fabio (o.g.) 57'; Pacheco 63'	Report	2' Andrino Moniz

Jiangning Sports Center, Nanjing
Referee: Ricardo Montero (Costa Rica)

Gold medal match

27 August 2014
20:45

Peru (gold)	2–1	South Korea
Gil 41'; Pacheco 55'	Report	Jeong Woo-yeong 16'

Jiangning Sports Center, Nanjing
Attendance: 15,603
Referee: Sascha Amhof (Switzerland)

== Gymnastics ==
=== Artistic Gymnastics ===
Peru qualified two athletes based on its performance at the 2014 Junior Pan American Artistic Gymnastics Championships.

Boys

Athlete	Event	Apparatus						Total	Rank
Athlete	Event	F	PH	R	V	PB	HB	Total	Rank
Luis Pizarro	Qualification	12.750 26	12.100 25	10.900 36	12.600 37	10.800 36	11.500 32	70.650	35

Girls

Athlete	Event	Apparatus				Total	Rank
Athlete	Event	V	UB	BB	F	Total	Rank
Ana Mendez Reyes	Qualification	13.325 23	9.700 31	8.700 39	11.900 22	43.625	35

== Judo ==
Peru qualified one athlete based on its performance at the 2013 Cadet World Judo Championships.

Individual

Athlete	Event	Round of 16	Quarterfinals	Semifinals	Rep 1	Rep 2	Rep 3	Final / BM	Rank
Athlete	Event	Opposition Result	Opposition Result	Opposition Result	Opposition Result	Opposition Result	Opposition Result	Opposition Result	Rank
Brillith Gamarra	Girls' -52 kg	Temelkova (BUL); L 000-101	Did not advance		Bye	Minenkova (BLR); L 001-001	Did not advance		11

Team

Athletes	Event	Round of 16	Quarterfinals	Semifinals	Final	Rank
Athletes	Event	Opposition Result	Opposition Result	Opposition Result	Opposition Result	Rank
Team Xian; Hifumi Abe (JPN); Chiara Carminucci (ITA); Naomi de Brune (AUS); Jolan Florimont (FRA); Brillith Gamarra (PER); Felix Penning (LUX); Marusa Stangar (SLO); Idan Vardi (ISR)	Mixed Team	Team Tani (MIX); W 7 – 0	Team Berghmans (MIX); W 4 – 3	Team Rouge (MIX); L 3 – 4	Did not advance	3rd place, bronze medalist(s)

== Rowing ==
Peru qualified one boat based on its performance at the Latin American Qualification Regatta.

Athlete	Event	Heats		Repechage		Semifinals		Final	
Athlete	Event	Time	Rank	Time	Rank	Time	Rank	Time	Rank
Gonzalo del Solar	Boys' Single Sculls	3:35.42	5 R	3:33.87	4 SC/D	3:34.58	3 FC	3:38.00	18

Qualification Legend: FA=Final A (medal); FB=Final B (non-medal); FC=Final C (non-medal); FD=Final D (non-medal); SA/B=Semifinals A/B; SC/D=Semifinals C/D; R=Repechage

== Sailing ==
Peru qualified two boats based on its performance at the Byte CII Central & South American Continental Qualifiers. Peru later qualified one more boat based on its performance at the Techno 293 Central & South American Continental Qualifiers.

Athlete	Event	Race											Net Points	Final Rank
Athlete	Event	1	2	3	4	5	6	7	8	9	10	M*	Net Points	Final Rank
Angello Giuria	Boys' Byte CII	4	3	14	20	15	23	(24)	17	Cancelled		120.00	96.00	15
Jarian Brandes	Girls' Byte CII	3	6	7	15	11	(21)	3	5	Cancelled		71.00	50.00	3rd place, bronze medalist(s)
María Belén Bazo	Girls' Techno 293	6	5	(14)	8	5	13	14	Cancelled			65.00	51.00	9

== Swimming ==
Peru qualified two swimmers.

Boys

Athlete	Event	Heat		Semifinal		Final	
Athlete	Event	Time	Rank	Time	Rank	Time	Rank
Nicholas Magana	50 m freestyle	—N/a					

Girls

Athlete	Event	Heat		Final	
Athlete	Event	Time	Rank	Time	Rank
Lizzy Nolasco	200 m butterfly	2:26.44	28	Did not advance	

== Tennis ==
Peru qualified two athletes based on the 9 June 2014 ITF World Junior Rankings.

Singles

Athlete	Event	Round of 32	Round of 16	Quarterfinals	Semifinals	Final / BM	Rank
Athlete	Event	Opposition Score	Opposition Score	Opposition Score	Opposition Score	Opposition Score	Rank
Nicolás Álvarez	Boys' Singles	Rublev (RUS); L 0 - 2; 3-6, 4-6	Did not advance				17
Juan José Rosas	Boys' Singles	Carey (BAH); W 2 - 1; 4-6, 6-2, 6-3	Luz (BRA); L 0 - 2; 2-6, 4-6	Did not advance			9

Doubles

Athletes	Event	Round of 32	Round of 16	Quarterfinals	Semifinals	Final / BM	Rank
Athletes	Event	Opposition Score	Opposition Score	Opposition Score	Opposition Score	Opposition Score	Rank
Nicolás Álvarez (PER); Juan José Rosas (PER)	Boys' Doubles	—N/a	Dissanayake (SRI); Rogan (MNE); W 2 - 0; 6-2, 6-3	Luz (BRA); Zormann (BRA); L 0 - 2; 4-6, 6^{5}-7^{10}	Did not advance		5
Nicolás Álvarez (PER); Markéta Vondroušová (CZE)	Mixed Doubles	Giangreco Campiz (PAR); Zormann (BRA); L 0 - 2; 5-7, 5-7	Did not advance				17
Juan José Rosas (PER); Doménica González (ECU)	Mixed Doubles	Kužmová (SVK); Martin Blaško (SVK); L 0 - 2; 5-7, 2-6	Did not advance				17

== Weightlifting ==
Peru qualified 1 quota in the boys' and girls' events based on the team ranking after the 2014 Weightlifting Youth Pan American Championships.

Boys

Athlete	Event	Snatch		Clean & jerk		Total	Rank
Athlete	Event	Result	Rank	Result	Rank	Total	Rank
Oscar Terrones	−69 kg	112	7	148	6	260	7

Girls

Athlete	Event	Snatch		Clean & jerk		Total	Rank
Athlete	Event	Result	Rank	Result	Rank	Total	Rank
Fiorella Cueva	−48 kg	55	9	79	7	134	8

== Wrestling ==
Peru qualified one athlete based on its performance at the 2014 Pan American Cadet Championships.

Key:
- VT - Victory by Fall.
- PP - Decision by Points - the loser with technical points.
- PO - Decision by Points - the loser without technical points.

Boys

Athlete	Event	Group stage				Final / RM	Rank
Athlete	Event	Opposition Score	Opposition Score	Opposition Score	Rank	Opposition Score	Rank
Nilton Soto Garcia	Greco-Roman -69kg	Mosebach (GER); L 0-4	Manville (USA); L 0-4	Marshall (NZL); W	3 Q	Ibrahim (EGY); L 1-4 ^{ST}	6
