= South Korea at the 2014 Summer Youth Olympics =

- IOC code: KOR
- NOC: Korean Sport & Olympic Committee
- Website: www.sports.or.kr

in Nanjing
- Competitors: 73 in 20 sports
- Medals Ranked 13th: Gold 4 Silver 6 Bronze 5 Total 15

Summer Youth Olympics appearances (overview)
- 2010; 2014; 2018; 2026

South Korea competed at the 2014 Summer Youth Olympics, in Nanjing, China from 16 August to 28 August 2014.

== Archery ==
South Korea qualified two archers from its performance at the 2013 World Archery Youth Championships.

Individual

Athlete	Event	Ranking round		Round of 32	Round of 16	Quarterfinals	Semifinals	Final / BM	Rank
Athlete	Event	Score	Seed	Opposition Score	Opposition Score	Opposition Score	Opposition Score	Opposition Score	Rank
Lee Woo-seok	Boys' Individual	704	1	Elsehely (EGY); W 6–0	Zolkepeli (MAS); W 6–0	Faber (SUI); W 6–2	Gazoz (TUR); W 6–0	D'Almeida (BRA); W 7–3	1st place, gold medalist(s)
Lee Eun Gyeong	Girls' Individual	681	1	Zinsou (BEN); W 6–0	Villegas (VEN); W 6–2	Anagoz (TUR); W 7–3	Gaubil (FRA); L 4–6	Machado (BRA); W 7–1	3rd place, bronze medalist(s)

Team

Athletes	Event	Ranking round		Round of 32	Round of 16	Quarterfinals	Semifinals	Final / BM	Rank
Athletes	Event	Score	Seed	Opposition Score	Opposition Score	Opposition Score	Opposition Score	Opposition Score	Rank
Merveille Zinsou (BEN); Lee Woo-seok (KOR)	Mixed Team	1202	32	Mugabilzada (AZE); Muto (JPN); L 2–6	Did not advance				17
Lee Eun-gyeong (KOR); Seifeldin Elsehely (EGY)	Mixed Team	1258	30	Romero (GUA); Martens (BEL); L 2–6	Did not advance				17

== Athletics ==
South Korea qualified six athletes.

Qualification Legend: Q=Final A (medal); qB=Final B (non-medal); qC=Final C (non-medal); qD=Final D (non-medal); qE=Final E (non-medal)

Boys
Track & road events

Athlete	Event	Heats		Final	
Athlete	Event	Result	Rank	Result	Rank
Choi Mingi	400 m	49.30	14 qB	50.40	14
Kim Gyeong-Tae	110 m hurdles	13.50 PB	2 Q	13.43 PB	3rd place, bronze medalist(s)
Joo Hyeonmyeong	10 km walk	—N/a		43:51.89 PB	5

Girls
Track & road events

Athlete	Event	Heats		Final	
Athlete	Event	Result	Rank	Result	Rank
kim Chaehyun	5 km walk	—N/a		24:36.53 PB	8

Field events

Athlete	Event	Qualification		Final	
Athlete	Event	Distance	Rank	Distance	Rank
Lee Hyeonjeong	Triple jump	12.44	7 Q	12.32	6
Yusun Jeong	Shot put	16.11	5 Q	16.03	5

== Badminton ==
South Korea qualified two athletes based on the 2 May 2014 BWF Junior World Rankings.

Singles

Athlete	Event	Group stage				Quarterfinal	Semifinal	Final / BM	Rank
Athlete	Event	Opposition Score	Opposition Score	Opposition Score	Rank	Opposition Score	Opposition Score	Opposition Score	Rank
Seo Seung-jae	Boys' Singles	Ong (SIN); W (21–12, 21–11)	Yuqi (CHN); L (15–21, 11–21)	Ayittey (GHA); W (Walkover)	2	Did not advance			9
Kim Ga Eun	Girls' Singles	Demirbag (TUR); W (21–12, 21–16)	Liang (SIN); W (21–15, 21–16)	Kabelo (BOT); W (21–14, 21–2)	1QF	Lee (TPE); L (18–21, 16–21)	Did not advance		5

Doubles

Athlete	Event	Group stage				Quarterfinal	Semifinal	Final / BM	Rank
Athlete	Event	Opposition Score	Opposition Score	Opposition Score	Rank	Opposition Score	Opposition Score	Opposition Score	Rank
Doha Hany (EGY); Seo Seung-jae (KOR)	Mixed Doubles	Shi (CHN); Lai (AUS); L (15–21, 10–21)	Coelho (BRA); Lesnaya (UKR); L (16–21, 15–21)	Vlaar (NED); Lais (AUT); L (21–16, 21–16)	2	Did not advance			
Kim Ga Eun (KOR); Lin Guipu (CHN)	Mixed Doubles	Citron (FRA); Macias (PER); W (21–11, 21–23, 21–14)	Gnedt (AUT); Solis (MEX); W (21–7, 21–7)	Cheam (MAS); Ng (HKG); L (20–22, 19–21)	2	Did not advance			

== Boxing ==
South Korea qualified one boxer based on its performance at the 2014 AIBA Youth World Championships

Boys

Athlete	Event	Preliminaries	Semifinals	Final / RM	Rank
Athlete	Event	Opposition Result	Opposition Result	Opposition Result	Rank
Jinnyong Kim	-91 kg	Bye	Filipi (CRO); L 1–2	Bronze Medal Bout Gallagher (IRL); L 0–3	4

== Canoeing ==
South Korea qualified one boat based on its performance at the 2013 World Junior Canoe Sprint and Slalom Championships.

Boys

Athlete	Event	Qualification		Round of 16		Quarterfinals	Semifinals	Final / BM	Rank
Athlete	Event	Time	Rank	Time	Rank	Opposition Result	Opposition Result	Opposition Result	Rank
Choi Jisung	C1 slalom								
Choi Jisung	C1 sprint								

== Fencing ==
South Korea qualified five athletes based on its performance at the 2014 FIE Cadet World Championships.

Boys

Athlete	Event	Pool Round	Seed	Round of 16	Quarterfinals	Semifinals	Final / BM	Rank
Athlete	Event	Opposition Score	Seed	Opposition Score	Opposition Score	Opposition Score	Opposition Score	Rank
Myeongki Kim	Épée	Pool 2 Yoo (USA); L 2–5; Ogilvie (NZL) Elsayed (EGY) Abate (ITA) French (CAN)	3	Elsayed (EGY); W 15–12	Yoo (USA); L 12–15	Did not advance		7
Myeong Cheol Seo	Foil	Heroui (ALG) Bianchi (ITA) El-Choueiri (LIB); W 5–1; C Choi (HKG) M Huang (CHN) A Rzadkowski (POL)		Marostega (BRA); W 15–11	Fitzgerald (AUS); W 15–3	Rządkowski (POL); L 10–15	Roger (FRA); L 11–15	4
Dongju Kim	Sabre	Y Yan (CHN) T Cucu (ROU) Al-Musawi (IRQ); W 5–1; M Ayman (EGY) I Ilin (RUS) B Alshamlan (KUW); W 5–3		B Alshamlan (KUW); W 15–12			Ilyin (RUS); L	2nd place, silver medalist(s)

Girls

Athlete	Event	Pool Round	Seed	Round of 16	Quarterfinals	Semifinals	Final / BM	Rank
Athlete	Event	Opposition Score	Seed	Opposition Score	Opposition Score	Opposition Score	Opposition Score	Rank
Sinhee Lee	Épée	Pool 2 Linde (SWE) Gaber (EGY) Mroszczak (POL) Nagy (HUN) Alqudah (JOR)	2	Bye	Yoshimura (JPN); W 15–14	Linde (SWE); W 15–10	de Marchi (ITA); W 15–13	1st place, gold medalist(s)
Eunhye Jeon	Sabre	Záhonyi (HUN) Crovari (ITA) Toledo (MEX) Colon (PUR) Boungab (ALG)						

Mixed Team

Athletes	Event	Round of 16	Quarterfinals	Semifinals / PM	Final / PM	Rank
Athletes	Event	Opposition Score	Opposition Score	Opposition Score	Opposition Score	Rank
Asia-Oceania 1 Chien Kei Hsu Albert (HKG); Choi Chun Yin Ryan (HKG); Misaki Emura (JPN); Kim Dongju (KOR); Lee Sinhee (KOR); Karin Miyawaki (JPN)	Mixed Team		Europe 4 W 30–22	Europe 2 W 30–29	Europe 1 W	1st place, gold medalist(s)
Asia-Oceania 2 Myeongki Kim (KOR); Yan Yinghui (CHN); Myeong Cheol Seo (KOR); Eunhye Jeon (KOR); Huang Ali (CHN); Miho Yoshimura (JPN)	Mixed Team	Europe 3 W 30–26		Europe 1 L	Europe 2 L 25–30	4

== Football ==
South Korea will compete in the boys' tournament.

=== Boys' tournament ===
Roster

- Hong Hyun-seok
- Im Wha-rang
- Jeong Woo-yeong
- Joo Hwi-min
- Kim Chan
- Kim Gyu-hyeong
- Kim Kyu-nam
- Kim Min-gyu
- Kim Seong-jun
- Kim Seung-ha
- Lee Chang-min
- Lee Ji-yong
- Lee Kyu-hyuk
- Lee Sang-su
- Lim Jae-hyuk
- Park Jun-phil
- Park Kyeong-woo
- Shin Do-hyun

Group Stage

Team	Pld	W	D	L	GF	GA	GD	Pts
South Korea	2	2	0	0	14	0	+14	6
Cape Verde	2	1	0	1	7	6	+1	3
Vanuatu	2	0	0	2	1	16	−15	0

15 August 2014
20:45

Cape Verde	0–5	South Korea
	Report	Kim Gyu-hyeong 4'; Jeong Woo-yeong 23' (pen.); Joo Hwi-min 36', 69'; Kim Seong-jun 59'

Jiangning Sports Center, Nanjing
Attendance: 8,312
Referee: Daniel Fedorczuk (Uruguay)

18 August 2014
20:45

South Korea	9–0	Vanuatu
Jeong Woo-yeong 10'; Kim Gyu-hyeong 14', 26', 31', 59'; Benson Rarua 53' (o.g.); Lee Ji-yong 62', 68', 80+1'	Report

Jiangning Sports Center, Nanjing
Attendance: 9,653
Referee: Ricardo Montero (Costa Rica)

Semi-final

24 August 2014
20:45

South Korea	1–1	Iceland
Joo Hwi-min 63'	Report	Helgi Gudjonsson 60'
Penalties
Lee Sang-su (penalty scored); Joo Hwi-min (penalty scored); Kim Min-gyu (penalty scored)	3–1	(penalty missed) Kolbeinn Finnsson; (penalty missed) Alex Þór Hauksson; (penalty scored) Helgi Gudjonsson; (penalty missed) Torfi Gunnarsson

Jiangning Sports Center, Nanjing
Attendance: 12,201
Referee: Daniel Fedorczuk (Uruguay)

Gold medal match

27 August 2014
20:45

Peru	2–1	South Korea (silver)
Franklin Gil 41'; Fernando Pacheco 55'	Report	Jeong Woo-yeong 16'

Jiangning Sports Center, Nanjing
Attendance: 15,603
Referee: Sascha Amhof (Switzerland)

== Golf ==
South Korea qualified one team of two athletes based on the 8 June 2014 IGF Combined World Amateur Golf Rankings.

Individual

Athlete	Event	Round 1		Round 2			Round 3			Total	
Athlete	Event	Score	Rank	Score	Total	Rank	Score	Total	Rank	Score	Rank
Youm Eun Ho	Boys										
Lee Soyoung	Girls	69	1	68	137	1			1		1st place, gold medalist(s)

Team

Athletes	Event	Round 1 (Foursome)		Round 2 (Fourball)			Round 3 (Individual Stroke)				Total	
Athletes	Event	Score	Rank	Score	Total	Rank	Boy	Girl	Total	Rank	Score	Rank
Youm Eun Ho; Lee Soyoung	Mixed	61 (−11)	1	71 (−1)	132 (−12)	2			140 (−4)	2	272 (−16)	2nd place, silver medalist(s)

== Gymnastics ==
=== Artistic Gymnastics ===
South Korea qualified two athletes based on its performance at the 2014 Asian Artistic Gymnastics Championships.

Boys

Athlete	Event	Apparatus						Total	Rank
Athlete	Event	F	PH	R	V	PB	HB	Total	Rank
Lim Myongwoo	Qualification	13.750 8 Q	11.400 30	13.300 9 Q	13.150 33	9.100 38	13.050 12	73.750	28
Lim Myongwoo	Floor	—N/a						13.766	3rd place, bronze medalist(s)
Lim Myongwoo	Rings	—N/a						12.733	8

Girls

Athlete	Event	Apparatus				Total	Rank
Athlete	Event	V	UB	BB	F	Total	Rank
Hana Park	Qualification	12.150 39	9.750 30	11.000 30	10.825 36	43.725	34

== Handball ==
South Korea qualified a girls' team based on its performance at the 2013 Asian Youth Games.

=== Girls' tournament ===
Roster

- Choi Ji-hyeon
- Gim Bo-eun
- Hur You-jin
- Kang Da-hye
- Kang Eun-hye
- Kang Kyung-min
- Kim Seong-eun
- Kim So-ra
- Lee Ga-hee
- Lee Ha-neul
- Park Jo-eun
- Park Jun-hee
- Park Min-jeong
- Yu So-jeong

Group stage

Pos	Team	Pld	W	D	L	GF	GA	GD	Pts	Qualification
1	Russia	2	2	0	0	70	52	+18	4	Semifinals
2	South Korea	2	1	0	1	70	59	+11	2	Semifinals
3	Angola	2	0	0	2	44	73	−29	0	5th place game

Source: Nanjing 2014
Rules for classification: 1) points; 2) head-to-head points; 3) head-to-head goal difference; 4) head-to-head number of goals scored; 5) goal difference.

21 August; 14:00	South Korea	39–23	Angola	Jiangning Sports Centre Gymnasium, Nanjing; Referees: Ota, Shimajiri (Japan)
21 August; 14:00	Kang 7	(20–11)	Costa 6	Jiangning Sports Centre Gymnasium, Nanjing; Referees: Ota, Shimajiri (Japan)
21 August; 14:00	2× (yellow card) 3× (suspension)	Report	3× (yellow card) 4× (suspension)	Jiangning Sports Centre Gymnasium, Nanjing; Referees: Ota, Shimajiri (Japan)

22 August; 14:00	Russia	36–31	South Korea	Jiangning Sports Centre Gymnasium, Nanjing; Referees: Wang, Li (China)
22 August; 14:00	Frolova 9	(16–16)	Yu 7	Jiangning Sports Centre Gymnasium, Nanjing; Referees: Wang, Li (China)
22 August; 14:00	2× (yellow card) 3× (suspension)	Report	3× (yellow card) 1× (suspension)	Jiangning Sports Centre Gymnasium, Nanjing; Referees: Wang, Li (China)

Semifinals

24 August; 13:00	South Korea	25–24	Sweden	Jiangning Sports Center Gymnasium; Referees: Brunner, Salah (Switzerland)
24 August; 13:00	Kang 6	(11–10)	Ekenman-Fernis 10	Jiangning Sports Center Gymnasium; Referees: Brunner, Salah (Switzerland)
24 August; 13:00	2× (yellow card) 2× (suspension) 1× (red card)	Report	3× (yellow card) 5× (suspension)	Jiangning Sports Center Gymnasium; Referees: Brunner, Salah (Switzerland)

Gold medal game

25 August; 18:00	South Korea (gold)	32–31	Russia	Jiangning Sports Center Gymnasium; Referees: Engberg, Laurell (Sweden)
25 August; 18:00	Kang 12	(17–14)	Golikova, Markova 7	Jiangning Sports Center Gymnasium; Referees: Engberg, Laurell (Sweden)
25 August; 18:00	3× (yellow card) 5× (suspension)	Report	3× (yellow card) 7× (suspension)	Jiangning Sports Center Gymnasium; Referees: Engberg, Laurell (Sweden)

== Judo ==
South Korea qualified two athletes based on its performance at the 2013 Cadet World Judo Championships.

Individual

Athlete	Event	Round of 32	Round of 16	Quarterfinals	Semifinals	Rep 1	Rep 2	Rep 3	Rep 4	Final / BM	Rank
Athlete	Event	Opposition Result	Opposition Result	Opposition Result	Opposition Result	Opposition Result	Opposition Result	Opposition Result	Opposition Result	Opposition Result	Rank
Seunghwan Ryu	Boys' −66 kg	Dermishyan (ARM); W 110–010	Minkou (BLR); W 100–000	Diaz (USA); W 100–000	Iadov (UKR); L 010–010	—N/a				Wu (CHN); L 000–000	5
Lee Hye-kyeong	Girls' −52 kg	—N/a	Elizeche (ARG); L 001–002	Did not advance		Bye	Siderot (POR); W 000–000	Amrane (ALG); W 101–000	Elizeche (ARG); W 000–000	Janashvili (GEO); W 100–000	3rd place, bronze medalist(s)

Team

Athletes	Event	Round of 16	Quarterfinals	Semifinals	Final	Rank
Athletes	Event	Opposition Result	Opposition Result	Opposition Result	Opposition Result	Rank
Team Geesink; Layana Colman (BRA); Nemanja Majdov (SRB); Dzmitry Minkou (BLR); Ryu Seunghwan (KOR); Ivana Sunjevic (MNE); Anastasya Turcheva (RUS); Yu-Jyun Wang (TPE)	Mixed Team	Team Chochishvili (MIX); W 4 – 3	Team Van De Walle (MIX); W 4 – 3	Team Douillet (MIX); W 3^{202} – 3^{111}	Team Rouge (MIX); L 2 – 4	2nd place, silver medalist(s)
Team Douillet; Gustavo Basile (ARG); Marko Bubanja (AUT); Adonis Diaz (USA); Liudmyla Drozdova (UKR); Lee Hye-kyeong (KOR); Brigita Matic (CRO); Peter Miles (GBR)	Mixed Team	Team Yamashita (MIX); W 3^{200} – 3^{112}	Team Nevzorov (MIX); W 5 – 2	Team Geesink (MIX); L 3^{111} – 3^{202}	Did not advance	3rd place, bronze medalist(s)

== Modern Pentathlon ==
South Korea qualified two athletes based on its performance at the Asian and Oceania YOG Qualifiers.

Athlete	Event	Fencing Ranking Round (épée one touch)		Swimming (200 m freestyle)			Fencing Final Round (épée one touch)			Combined: Shooting/Running (10 m air pistol)/(3000 m)			Total Points	Final Rank
Athlete	Event	Results	Rank	Time	Rank	Points	Results	Rank	Points	Time	Rank	Points	Total Points	Final Rank
Gilung Park	Boys' Individual		7											15
Juhye Choi	Girls' Individual		7										1014	8
Gilung Park (KOR); Aurora Tognetti (ITA)	Mixed Relay				8	335					3			3rd place, bronze medalist(s)
Juhye Choi (KOR); Max Esposito (AUS)	Mixed Relay													

== Shooting ==
South Korea qualified two shooters based on its performance at the 2014 Asian Shooting Championships.

Individual

Athlete	Event	Qualification		Final	
Athlete	Event	Points	Rank	Points	Rank
Kim Cheongyong	Boys' 10m Air Pistol	587	1 Q	199.8	2nd place, silver medalist(s)
Kim Min-jung	Girls' 10m Air Pistol	375	6 Q	175.4	3rd place, bronze medalist(s)

Team

Athletes	Event	Qualification		Round of 16	Quarterfinals	Semifinals	Final / BM	Rank
Athletes	Event	Points	Rank	Opposition Result	Opposition Result	Opposition Result	Opposition Result	Rank
Kim Cheongyong (KOR); Samuela Ernstova (SVK)	Mixed Team 10m Air Pistol							
Kim Min-jung (KOR); Peter Karl Otto Schulze (CAN)	Mixed Team 10m Air Pistol		Q	Chung (TPE); Igityan (ARM); L	Did not advance			17

== Swimming ==
South Korea qualified four swimmers.

Boys

Athlete	Event	Heat		Semifinal		Final	
Athlete	Event	Time	Rank	Time	Rank	Time	Rank
Song Sukgyu	100 m backstroke	59.55	34	Did not advance			
Song Sukgyu	200 m backstroke	2:05.08	15	—N/a		Did not advance	
Kim Jaeyoun	50 m breaststroke	28.89	9 Q	28.89	10	Did not advance	
Kim Jaeyoun	100 m breaststroke	1:03.62	15 Q	1:03.01	10	Did not advance	
Kim Jaeyoun	200 m breaststroke	2:17.40	12	—N/a		Did not advance	

Girls

Athlete	Event	Heat		Semifinal		Final	
Athlete	Event	Time	Rank	Time	Rank	Time	Rank
Park Jin-young	50 m butterfly	28.24	19	Did not advance			
Park Jin-young	100 m butterfly	1:00.80	7 Q	1:00.02	4 Q	59.94	5
Park Jin-young	200 m butterfly	2:11.88	3 Q	—N/a		2:10.30	4
Yang Jiwon	50 m breaststroke	32.31	7 Q	32.22	6 Q	32.14	7
Yang Jiwon	100 m breaststroke	1:10.96	12 Q	1:10.43	9	Did not advance	
Yang Jiwon	200 m breaststroke	2:31.07	4 Q	—N/a		2:27.31	2nd place, silver medalist(s)

Mixed

Athlete	Event	Heat		Final	
Athlete	Event	Time	Rank	Time	Rank
Kim Jaeyoun; Park Jin-young; Song Sukgyu; Yang Jiwon	4×100 m freestyle relay	3:51.81	17	Did not advance	
Kim Jaeyoun; Park Jin-young; Song Sukgyu; Yang Jiwon	4×100 m medley relay	4:02.99	13	Did not advance	

== Table Tennis ==
South Korea qualified a male athlete based on the ITTF Under-18 World Rankings. Later South Korea qualified a female athlete based on its performance at the Road to Nanjing series.

Singles

Athlete	Event	Group Stage	Rank	Round of 16	Quarterfinals	Semifinals	Final / BM	Rank
Athlete	Event	Opposition Score	Rank	Opposition Score	Opposition Score	Opposition Score	Opposition Score	Rank
Minhyeok Kim	Boys	Group E Toranzos (PAR); W 3 – 0						
Minhyeok Kim	Boys	Chen (POR); L 2 – 3						
Minhyeok Kim	Boys	Ghallab (EGY)						
Park Seri	Girls	Group D Zhang (USA); L 1 – 3						
Park Seri	Girls	Kim (UZB)						
Park Seri	Girls	Zarif (FRA)						

Team

Athletes	Event	Group Stage	Rank	Round of 16	Quarterfinals	Semifinals	Final / BM	Rank
Athletes	Event	Opposition Score	Rank	Opposition Score	Opposition Score	Opposition Score	Opposition Score	Rank
South Korea; Park Seri (KOR); Minhyeok Kim (KOR)	Mixed	Kazakhstan; Ryabova (KAZ); Gerassimenko (KAZ); W	Q		China; Liu (CHN); Fan (CHN); L 0 – 2	Did not advance		8
South Korea; Park Seri (KOR); Minhyeok Kim (KOR)	Mixed	France; Zarif (FRA); Akkuzu (FRA)	Q		China; Liu (CHN); Fan (CHN); L 0 – 2	Did not advance		8
South Korea; Park Seri (KOR); Minhyeok Kim (KOR)	Mixed	Egypt; Saad (EGY); Ghallab (EGY); W	Q		China; Liu (CHN); Fan (CHN); L 0 – 2	Did not advance		8

Qualification Legend: Q=Main Bracket (medal); qB=Consolation Bracket (non-medal)

== Taekwondo ==
South Korea qualified one athlete based on its performance at the Taekwondo Qualification Tournament.

Boys

Athlete	Event	Round of 16	Quarterfinals	Semifinals	Final	Rank
Athlete	Event	Opposition Result	Opposition Result	Opposition Result	Opposition Result	Rank
Joo Donghun	−55 kg	Arriagada (CHI); W 11 – 5	Melki (LIB); W 18 – 9	Ketbi (BEL); W 3 – 2	Huang (TPE); L 2 – 7	2nd place, silver medalist(s)

== Tennis ==
South Korea qualified three athletes based on the 9 June 2014 ITF World Junior Rankings.

Singles

Athlete	Event	Round of 32	Round of 16	Quarterfinals	Semifinals	Final / BM	Rank
Athlete	Event	Opposition Score	Opposition Score	Opposition Score	Opposition Score	Opposition Score	Rank
Chung Yun-seong	Boys' Singles	Zukas (ARG); W 2–0; 6–1, 7–5	Zukas (BEL); L 1–2; 6–3, 0–6, 6^{5}-7^{7}	Did not advance			9
Lee Duck-hee	Boys' Singles	Roberts (BAH); W 2–0; 6–2, 6–4	Biró (HUN); W 2–0; 6–2, 6–0	Biró (POL); L 1 (Ret)-2; 6–3, 4–6, 0^{r}-0	Did not advance		5
Kim Dabin	Girls' Singles	Stefani (BRA); W 2–0; 7–5, 6–2	Schmiedlová (SVK); L 0 (Ret)-2; 2–6, 1^{r}-1	Did not advance			9

Doubles

Athletes	Event	Round of 32	Round of 16	Quarterfinals	Semifinals	Final / BM	Rank
Athletes	Event	Opposition Score	Opposition Score	Opposition Score	Opposition Score	Opposition Score	Rank
Chung Yun-seong (KOR); Lee Duck-hee (KOR)	Boys' Doubles	—N/a	Blaško (SVK); Molčan (SVK); W 2–0; 6–3, 6–3	Majchrzak (POL); Zieliński (POL); L w/o	Did not advance		5
Kim Dabin (KOR); Kamonwan Buayam (THA)	Girls' Doubles	—N/a	Kasatkina (RUS); Komardina (RUS); L 1–2; 7^{7}-6^{5}, 3–6, [9]-[11]	Did not advance			9
Kamonwan Buayam (THA); Chung Yun-seong (KOR)	Mixed Doubles	Stefani (BRA); Luz (BRA); L 0–2; 2–6, 2–6	Did not advance				17
Kim Dabin (KOR); Lee Duck-hee (KOR)	Mixed Doubles	Shymanovich (BLR); Chrysochos (CYP); W 2–1; 3–6, 6–4, [13]-[11]	Heinová (CZE); Carey (BAH); L w/o	Did not advance			9

== Triathlon ==
South Korea qualified two athletes based on its performance at the 2014 Asian Youth Olympic Games Qualifier.

Individual

Athlete	Event	Swim (750m)	Trans 1	Bike (20 km)	Trans 2	Run (5 km)	Total Time	Rank
Lee Gyunhyung	Boys	09:48	00:43	29:30	00:24	18:16	0:58:41	20
Kim Gyuri	Girls	10:49	00:55	32:54	00:24	19:00	1:04:02	15

Relay

Athlete	Event	Total Times per Athlete (Swim 250m, Bike 6.6 km, Run 1.8 km)	Total Group Time	Rank
Asia 1 Minami Kubono (JPN); Lam Michael (HKG); Kim Gyuri (KOR); Lee Gyuhyung (KOR)	Mixed Relay	21:43; 20:06; 23:10; 21:41	1:26:40	8

== Weightlifting ==
South Korea qualified 1 quota in the boys' events based on the team ranking after the 2014 Weightlifting Youth & Junior Asian Championships.

Boys

Athlete	Event	Snatch		Clean & jerk		Total	Rank
Athlete	Event	Result	Rank	Result	Rank	Total	Rank
Hwang Seunghwan	−85 kg	135	5	165	5	300	5

== Wrestling ==
South Korea qualified one athlete based on its performance at the 2014 Asian Cadet Championships.

Key:
- VT – Victory by Fall.
- PP – Decision by Points – the loser with technical points.
- PO – Decision by Points – the loser without technical points.

Girls

Athlete	Event	Group stage				Final / RM	Rank
Athlete	Event	Opposition Score	Opposition Score	Opposition Score	Rank	Opposition Score	Rank
Chae-Rin Park	Freestyle −70kg	Youin (CIV); W 4 – 0	Keju (MHL); W 4 – 1	Kılıç (TUR); L	2 Q	Strzalka (POL); L 1 – 3 ^{VT}	4
