= Park Jin-young (disambiguation) =

Park Jin-young (born 1994) is a South Korean singer, actor, songwriter, and member of GOT7.

Park Jin-young or Jinyoung Park may also refer to:

- Park Jin-young (swimmer) (born 1997), South Korean swimmer
- Jinyoung Park (mathematician) (born 1982), proposer of proof of the Kahn–Kalai conjecture
- J.Y. Park (born Park Jin-young; 1971), South Korean singer-songwriter and founder of JYP Entertainment

== See also ==
- Jinyoung (disambiguation)
- Park Ji-young (disambiguation)
