= Swimming at the 2014 Summer Youth Olympics – Girls' 200 metre butterfly =

Girls' 200 metre butterfly at the 2014 Summer Youth Olympics
- Venue: Nanjing Olympic Sports Centre
- Dates: August 18, 2014 (heats & final)
- Competitors: 29 from 24 nations
- Winning time: 2:06.59

Medalists
gold medal	Liliána Szilágyi	Hungary
silver medal	Zhang Yufei	China
bronze medal	Brianna Throssell	Australia

The girls' 200 metre butterfly event in swimming at the 2014 Summer Youth Olympics took place on 18 August at the Nanjing Olympic Sports Centre in Nanjing, China.

== Results ==
=== Heats ===
The heats were held at 10:32.

Rank	Heat	Lane	Name	Nationality	Time	Notes
1	3	4	Liliána Szilágyi	Hungary	2:09.44	Q
2	4	4	Zhang Yufei	China	2:11.62	Q
3	4	5	Park Jin-young	South Korea	2:11.88	Q
4	3	5	Dalma Sebestyén	Hungary	2:12.14	Q
5	2	4	Brianna Throssell	Australia	2:12.31	Q
6	3	3	Jurina Shiga	Japan	2:12.50	Q
7	2	6	Monalisa Lorenza	Indonesia	2:13.08	Q
8	3	2	Jimena Pérez	Spain	2:14.40	Q
9	4	3	Nguyễn Thị Ánh Viên	Vietnam	2:13.90	
10	2	3	Claudia Hufnagl	Austria	2:15.11	
11	2	5	Claudia Tarzia	Italy	2:15.32	
12	3	7	Rina Yoshimura	Japan	2:15.44	
13	2	2	Sarisa Suwannachet	Thailand	2:15.97	
14	4	7	Camille Wishaupt	France	2:16.31	
15	3	6	Giovanna Diamante	Brazil	2:16.34	
15	4	1	Nida Eliz Üstündağ	Turkey	2:16.34	
17	2	1	Simone Palomo	Venezuela	2:16.94	
18	2	7	Kathrin Demler	Germany	2:17.55	
19	4	6	Charlotte Atkinson	Great Britain	2:18.56	
20	1	4	Josephina Lorda	Argentina	2:18.90	
21	3	1	María Far	Panama	2:18.96	
22	4	2	Lê Thị Mỹ Thảo	Vietnam	2:19.12	
23	1	3	Olivia Fernandez	Indonesia	2:19.64	
24	1	5	Fernandez Vanessa	Venezuela	2:19.84	
25	3	8	Julimar Ávila	Honduras	2:22.78	
26	1	6	Noel Borshi	Albania	2:23.13	
27	1	7	Hamida Nefsi	Algeria	2:26.30	
28	2	8	Lizzy Nolasco	Peru	2:26.44	
	1	2	Danika Huizinga	Canada	DSQ	
	4	8	Mariam Sakr	Egypt	DNS	

=== Final ===
The final was held at 18:04.

Rank	Lane	Name	Nationality	Time	Notes
1st place, gold medalist(s)	4	Liliána Szilágyi	Hungary	2:06.59	
2nd place, silver medalist(s)	5	Zhang Yufei	China	2:08.22	
3rd place, bronze medalist(s)	2	Brianna Throssell	Australia	2:09.65	
4	3	Park Jin-young	South Korea	2:10.30	
5	6	Dalma Sebestyén	Hungary	2:10.34	
6	7	Jurina Shiga	Japan	2:13.54	
7	1	Monalisa Lorenza	Indonesia	2:13.68	
8	8	Jimena Pérez	Spain	2:15.36	
