= Jinyong =

Jinyong may refer to:

- Jin Yong (Louis Cha Leung-yung, 1924–2018), a Chinese wuxia writer
- 10930 Jinyong, a minor planet
- Lee Chin-yung (born 1951), or Lǐ Jìnyǒng, a Taiwanese politician

== See also ==
- Jinyoung (disambiguation)
- Heroes of Jin Yong, a tactical role-playing game
