= Hong Hyun-seok =

South Korean footballer (born 1999)

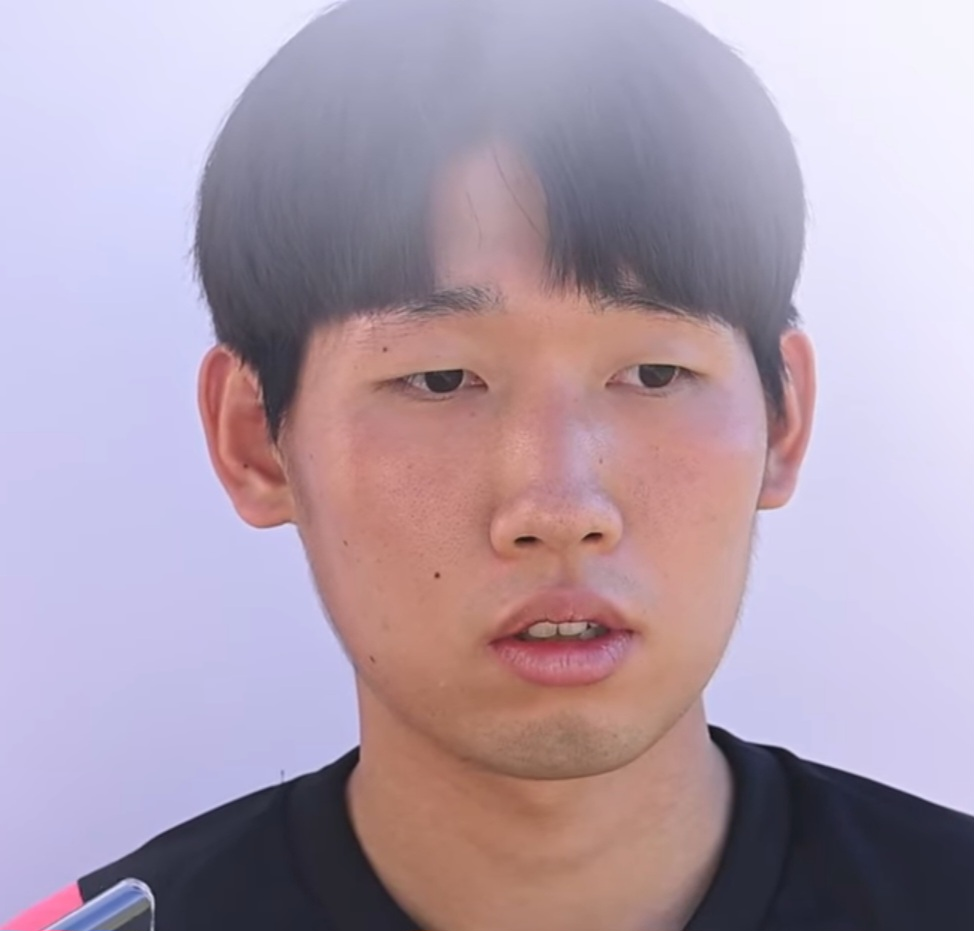
- Hong in 2022

Personal information
- Date of birth: 16 June 1999 (age 27)
- Place of birth: Seoul, South Korea
- Height: 1.77 m (5 ft 10 in)
- Position: Midfielder

Team information
- Current team: Midtjylland (on loan from Mainz 05)
- Number: 20

Youth career
- 2012–2017: Ulsan Hyundai (Note: Played for Hyundai Middle School from 2012 to 2014, and Hyundai High School from 2015 to 2017, which were academies of Ulsan Hyundai.)

Senior career*
| Years | Team | Apps | (Gls) |
| 2018–2021 | Ulsan Hyundai | 0 | (0) |
| 2018–2019 | → SpVgg Unterhaching (loan) | 7 | (0) |
| 2019–2021 | → Juniors OÖ (loan) | 52 | (2) |
| 2021–2022 | LASK | 27 | (0) |
| 2022–2024 | Gent | 70 | (11) |
| 2024– | Mainz 05 | 23 | (0) |
| 2025 | → Nantes (loan) | 6 | (0) |
| 2026 | → Gent (loan) | 19 | (1) |
| 2026– | → Midtjylland (loan) | 2 | (0) |

International career^{‡}
| 2014–2016 | South Korea U17 | 9 | (0) |
| 2022–2023 | South Korea U23 | 11 | (3) |
| 2023– | South Korea | 16 | (0) |
Medal record
Men's football
Representing South Korea
Youth Olympic Games
| Silver medal – second place | 2014 Nanjing |
Asian Games
| Gold medal – first place | 2022 Hangzhou |
- * Club domestic league appearances and goals as of 25 October 2026 ‡ National team caps and goals as of 31 March 2026

Hong Hyun-seok (Korean: 홍현석; born 16 June 1999) is a South Korean professional footballer who plays as a central or attacking midfielder for Danish Superliga club Midtjylland, on loan from Bundesliga club Mainz 05, and the South Korea national team.

== Club career ==
=== Early career ===
In January 2018, a youth player of Ulsan Hyundai, Hong was loaned to German 3. Liga club SpVgg Unterhaching. On 27 February 2019, he made his professional debut, coming on as a substitute for Lucas Hufnagel in the 84th minute of a 3. Liga match against VfR Aalen. In the summer of 2019, he was once again loaned, moving to Austrian 2. Liga club Juniors OÖ. After two years at Juniors OÖ, he joined LASK, making his first permanent move. During the 2021–22 season, he played for LASK at the Austrian Bundesliga and the UEFA Conference League.

=== Gent ===
On 8 August 2022, Hong moved to Belgian Pro League club Gent in the aftermath of an ACL injury suffered by striker Tarik Tissoudali, becoming the first Korean to play for the club. On 12 August, he scored a spectacular overhead kick goal in a 3–1 away win over Oostende, where he made his debut. While adapting quickly at Gent in the first season, he had 5 goals and 5 assists in 31 Pro League matches, and 1 goal and 4 assists in 12 Conference League matches. His rapid growth at Gent led him to join the South Korea national team.

=== Mainz 05 ===
On 29 August 2024, Hong joined Bundesliga club Mainz 05 on a four-year deal until 30 June 2028. During his first season at Mainz, he played as a substitute for main attacking midfielders Lee Jae-sung and Paul Nebel in 19 matches excluding four starts.

==== Loan to Nantes ====
On 30 July 2025, Hong was loaned to Ligue 1 club Nantes, with an option to buy. While Nantes struggled to escape the relegation zone in the first half of the season, he did not show great influence, appearing in only six matches. His loan contract was eventually terminated early.

==== Loan to Gent ====
On 14 January 2026, he was loaned to Gent, returning to his former club until the end of the season.

==== Loan to Midtjylland ====
On 2 September 2026, Hong joined Danish Superliga club Midtjylland on a season-long loan with a conditional obligation to buy.

== International career ==
Hong was included in South Korea's under-15 squad for the 2014 Summer Youth Olympics held in Nanjing, China. He played all four matches as a starter, earning a silver medal.

== Career statistics ==
=== Club ===
As of match played 6 November 2026

Appearances and goals by club, season and competition
| Club | Season | League | | | National cup | | Continental | | Total | |
| Club | Season | Division | Apps | Goals | Apps | Goals | Apps | Goals | Apps | Goals |
|---|---|---|---|---|---|---|---|---|---|---|
| SpVgg Unterhaching (loan) | 2018–19 | 3. Liga | 7 | 0 | — | | — | | 7 | 0 |
| Juniors OÖ (loan) | 2019–20 | Austrian 2. Liga | 28 | 0 | 2 | 0 | 0 | 0 | 30 | 0 |
| Juniors OÖ (loan) | 2020–21 | Austrian 2. Liga | 24 | 2 | 0 | 0 | 0 | 0 | 24 | 2 |
| Juniors OÖ (loan) | Total | | 52 | 2 | 2 | 0 | 0 | 0 | 54 | 2 |
| LASK | 2021–22 | Austrian Bundesliga | 24 | 0 | 4 | 0 | 12 (Note: Appearances in UEFA Conference League) | 1 | 40 | 1 |
| LASK | 2022–23 | Austrian Bundesliga | 3 | 0 | 1 | 0 | 0 | 0 | 4 | 0 |
| LASK | Total | | 27 | 0 | 5 | 0 | 12 | 1 | 44 | 1 |
| Gent | 2022–23 | Belgian Pro League | 37 | 6 | 3 | 2 | 14 (Note: Twelve appearances and one goal in UEFA Conference League, two appearances in UEFA Europa League) | 1 | 54 | 9 |
| Gent | 2023–24 | Belgian Pro League | 30 | 5 | 2 | 1 | 11 | 1 | 43 | 7 |
| Gent | 2024–25 | Belgian Pro League | 3 | 0 | 0 | 0 | 4 | 2 | 7 | 2 |
| Gent | Total | | 70 | 11 | 5 | 3 | 29 | 4 | 104 | 18 |
| Mainz 05 | 2024–25 | Bundesliga | 23 | 0 | 0 | 0 | — | | 23 | 0 |
| Nantes (loan) | 2025–26 | Ligue 1 | 6 | 0 | 0 | 0 | — | | 6 | 0 |
| Gent (loan) | 2025–26 | Belgian Pro League | 19 | 1 | 0 | 0 | — | | 19 | 1 |
| Midtjylland (loan) | 2026–27 | Danish Superliga | 2 | 0 | 1 | 0 | 3 | 0 | 6 | 0 |
| Career total | | | 206 | 14 | 13 | 3 | 44 | 5 | 263 | 22 |

== Honours ==
South Korea U17

- Summer Youth Olympics silver medal: 2014

South Korea U23

- Asian Games: 2022
