= Fernando Pacheco (disambiguation) =

Fernando Pacheco (born 1992) is a Spanish footballer.

Fernando Pacheco may also refer to:

- Fernando Pacheco Filho (born 1983), Brazilian former handball player
- Fernando Pacheco (footballer, born 1999), Peruvian footballer
