= Honduras at the 2014 Summer Youth Olympics =

- IOC code: HON
- NOC: Comité Olímpico Hondureño

in Nanjing
- Competitors: 21 in 3 sports
- Medals: Gold 0 Silver 0 Bronze 0 Total 0

Summer Youth Olympics appearances
- 2010; 2014; 2018; 2026

Honduras competed at the 2014 Summer Youth Olympics, in Nanjing, China from 16 August to 28 August 2014.

== Football ==
Honduras competed in the boys' tournament.

=== Boys' Tournament ===
Roster

- Elin Agurcia Avila
- Denilson Almendarez Sauceda
- Joel Banegas Saravia
- Paolo Belloni Urso
- Jose Caballero Cortez
- Wesly Decas
- Darwin Diego Mejia
- Anderson Flores Lozano
- Alex Laureano Archaga
- Allan Martinez Reyes
- Kevin Paz Pineda
- Oscar Reyes Puerto
- Ojeyel Ruiz Suazo
- Mikel Santos Castillo
- Dayron Suazo Arzu
- Javier Umana Granados
- Jairo Umanzor Garcia
- Jose Vasquez Ortiz

Group Stage

Team	Pld	W	D	L	GF	GA	GD	Pts
Peru	2	2	0	0	5	2	+3	6
Iceland	2	1	0	1	6	2	+4	3
Honduras	2	0	0	2	1	8	−7	0

15 August 2014
18:00

Honduras	0–5	Iceland
	Report	Kolbeinn Finnsson 15' (pen.); Aron Kari Adalsteinsson 40+1'; Helgi Gudjonsson 41', 59', 73'

Jiangning Sports Center, Nanjing
Attendance: 8,312
Referee: Abdelkader Zitouni (France)

21 August 2014
18:00

Peru	3–1	Honduras
Franklin Gil 34' (pen.); Cristoger Olivares 37' (pen.); Quilian Meléndez 74'	Report	Alex Laureano 77'

Jiangning Sports Center, Nanjing
Attendance: 8,466
Referee: Maguette N'Diaye (Senegal)

Fifth place match

25 August 2014
20:45

Honduras	5–0	Vanuatu
Darwin Diego 2'; Alex Laureano 15'; Mikel Santos 21', 40+1', 64'	Report

Jiangning Sports Center, Nanjing
Attendance: 8,102
Referee: Abdelkader Zitouni (France)

== Swimming ==
Honduras qualified two swimmers.

Boys

Athlete	Event	Heat		Semifinal		Final	
Athlete	Event	Time	Rank	Time	Rank	Time	Rank
Jesus Flores Samayoa	50 m breaststroke	29.69	26	did not advance			
Jesus Flores Samayoa	100 m breaststroke	1:04.96	28	did not advance			

Girls

Athlete	Event	Heat		Semifinal		Final	
Athlete	Event	Time	Rank	Time	Rank	Time	Rank
Julimar Avila Mancia	100 m freestyle	58.94	31	did not advance			
Julimar Avila Mancia	200 m butterfly	2:22.78	25	—N/a		did not advance	

== Wrestling ==
Honduras was given a spot to compete from the Tripartite Commission.

Key:

- VT - Victory by Fall.
- PP - Decision by Points - the loser with technical points.
- PO - Decision by Points - the loser without technical points.

Boys

Athlete	Event	Group stage				Final / RM	Rank
Athlete	Event	Opposition Score	Opposition Score	Opposition Score	Rank	Opposition Score	Rank
Carlos Rivera Rosales	Freestyle -76kg	Izquierdo (COL); L 0-4 ^{VT}	Barraj (TUN); L 0-4 ^{ST}	Simonia (GEO); L 1-4 ^{ST}	4 Q	Vou (ASA); W 4-0	7
