= Christopher Olivares =

Greek-born Peruvian footballer (born 1999)

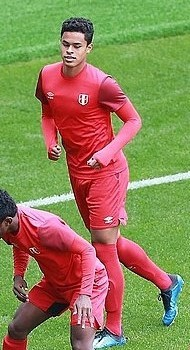
- Olivares playing for Peru U20 in 2018

Personal information
- Full name: Christopher Robin Olivares Burga
- Date of birth: 3 April 1999 (age 27)
- Place of birth: Thessaloniki, Greece
- Height: 1.88 m (6 ft 2 in)
- Position: Forward

Team information
- Current team: Deportivo Garcilaso

Youth career
- –2016: Esther Grande de Bentín
- 2017: Sporting Cristal

Senior career*
Years	Team	Apps	(Gls)
2017–2022	Sporting Cristal	90	(16)
2019	→ Vitória Guimarães B (loan)	9	(1)
2023	Deportivo Municipal	15	(6)
2023	Cusco FC	13	(0)
2024	Universitario de Deportes	10	(2)
2025	Atlético Grau	21	(2)
2026-	Deportivo Garcilaso	8	(1)

International career^{‡}
2015	Peru U17	3	(0)
2018–2019	Peru U20	2	(0)
2020	Peru U23	4	(0)
Medal record
Men's football
Representing Peru
Youth Olympic Games
Gold medal – first place	2014 Nanjing
- * Club domestic league appearances and goals as of 18:02, 20 June 2019 (UTC) ‡ National team caps and goals as of 18:02, 20 June 2019 (UTC)

Christopher Robin Olivares Burga (born 3 April 1999) is a footballer who currently plays as a forward for Peruvian Liga 1 club Deportivo Garcilaso. Born in Greece, he represents Peru at youth level.

He is the son of former Peru International Percy Olivares.

== Early life ==
Olivares was born on 3 April 1999 in Thessaloniki, Greece second largest and most populous city and capital of the Central Macedonia. He is the only child of Percy Olivares and Cristina Burga. His father, also a footballer, played for PAOK FC at the time of his birth. His family, originally from Lima and of Afro-Peruvian descent, was living in Thessaloniki at the time.

From an early age, he showed an inclination for attacking football. Although he developed his game in a comfortable environment, his first contact with the world of football came in 2004, when he joined the youth ranks of Esther Grande de Bentín. He even did internships in October 2015 at Twente, in September 2016 at Benfica and Eintracht Frankfurt, and in December 2016 he travelled to Mexico with Andy Huamán to try out for the Pumas UNAM. In early 2017, he joined the Sporting Cristal reserve team on loan, where he converted to centre forward in the team managed by Pablo Zegarra. He participated in the reserve and Copa Federación tournaments until August 2017, when he made the leap to the first team, where he ended up staying.

== Career ==
Olivares came from the youth ranks of Esther Grande de Bentín, where he played as an attacking midfielder. In 2017, he moved to Sporting Cristal and started playing in its reserves, where he was reconverted into a centre-forward by manager Pablo Zegarra, scoring 18 goals. In August of that year, he was promoted to the first team, making his professional debut coming from the bench in a 0–0 home draw against Juan Aurich and scoring his first professional goal the following matchday, in a 2–2 away draw against Unión Comercio.

== International career ==
On 9 June 2023, Olivares was called up for the first time to Peru national team to play in matches against Japan and South Korea, being called up as an emergency replacement following injuries to Luis Advíncula and Andy Polo.

== Career statistics ==
=== Club ===
As of 20 June 2019.

Club	Season	League			National Cup		League Cup		Continental		Other		Total	
Club	Season	Division	Apps	Goals	Apps	Goals	Apps	Goals	Apps	Goals	Apps	Goals	Apps	Goals
Sporting Cristal	2017	Peruvian Primera División	13	1	0	0	–		0	0	0	0	13	1
Sporting Cristal	2018	Peruvian Primera División	23	4	0	0	–		0	0	2 (Note: Appearances in the Copa Sudamericana)	0	25	4
Sporting Cristal	2019	Peruvian Primera División	0	0	0	0	–		0	0	0	0	0	0
Sporting Cristal	Total		36	5	0	0	0	0	0	0	2	0	38	5
Vitória Guimarães B (loan)	2018–19	LigaPro	9	1	–		–		–		0	0	9	1
Career total			45	6	0	0	0	0	0	0	2	0	47	6

== Honours ==
Sporting Cristal

- Primera División (2): 2018, 2020
- Copa Bicentenario: 2021
- Torneo Apertura: 2021

Universitario de Deportes

- Peruvian Primera División: 2024

Peru U15

- Youth Olympic Games: 2014
