= Iceland at the 2014 Summer Youth Olympics =

- IOC code: ISL
- NOC: Icelandic Olympic Committee
- Website: www.olympic.is

in Nanjing
- Competitors: 20 in 2 sports
- Flag bearer: Aron Adalsteinsson
- Medals Ranked 80th: Gold 0 Silver 0 Bronze 1 Total 1

Summer Youth Olympics appearances
- 2010; 2014; 2018

Iceland competed at the 2014 Summer Youth Olympics, in Nanjing, China from 16 August to 28 August 2014.

== Football ==
Iceland competed in the boys' tournament.

=== Boys' Tournament ===
Roster

- Aron Adalsteinsson
- Atli Hrafn Andrason
- Sigurbergur Bjarnason
- Solvi Bjornsson
- Kolbeinn Finnsson
- Helgi Gudjonsson
- Torfi Gunnarsson
- Alex Þór Hauksson
- Jonatan Jonsson
- Kristófer Kristinsson
- Gísli Þorgeir Kristjánsson
- Isak Kristjansson
- Karl Magnusson
- Hilmar McShane
- Kristinn Petursson
- Aron Stefansson
- Oliver Thorlacius
- Gudmundur Tryggvason

Group Stage

Team	Pld	W	D	L	GF	GA	GD	Pts
Peru	2	2	0	0	5	2	+3	6
Iceland	2	1	0	1	6	2	+4	3
Honduras	2	0	0	2	1	8	−7	0

15 August 2014
18:00

Honduras	0–5	Iceland
	Report	Kolbeinn Finnsson 15' (pen.); Aron Kari Adalsteinsson 40+1'; Helgi Gudjonsson 41', 59', 73'

Jiangning Sports Center, Nanjing
Attendance: 8,312
Referee: Abdelkader Zitouni (France)

18 August 2014
18:00

Iceland	1–2	Peru
Torfi Gunnarsson 42'	Report	Kristofer Ingi Kristinsson 4' (o.g.); Gerald Tavara 26'

Jiangning Sports Center, Nanjing
Attendance: 9,653
Referee: Fu Ming (China)

Semi-final

24 August 2014
20:45

South Korea	1–1	Iceland
Joo Hwimin 63'	Report	Helgi Gudjonsson 60'
Penalties
Lee Sangsu (penalty scored); Joo Hwimin (penalty scored); Kim Mingyu (penalty scored)	3–1	(penalty missed) Kolbeinn Finnsson; (penalty missed) Alex Þór Hauksson; (penalty scored) Helgi Gudjonsson; (penalty missed) Torfi Gunnarsson

Jiangning Sports Center, Nanjing
Attendance: 12,201
Referee: Daniel Fedorczuk (Uruguay)

Bronze medal match

27 August 2014
18:00

Cape Verde	0–4	Iceland (bronze)
	Report	Kolbeinn Finnsson 14' (pen.); Torfi Gunnarsson 40'; Fabio Ramos de Brito 42' (o.g.); Helgi Gudjonsson 61'

Jiangning Sports Center, Nanjing
Attendance: 15,603
Referee: Fu Ming (China)

== Swimming ==
Iceland qualified two swimmers.

Boys

Athlete	Event	Heat		Semifinal		Final	
Athlete	Event	Time	Rank	Time	Rank	Time	Rank
Kristinn Thorarinsson	50 m backstroke	27.05	22	did not advance			
Kristinn Thorarinsson	100 m backstroke	57.98	26	did not advance			
Kristinn Thorarinsson	200 m backstroke	2:07.53	25	—N/a		did not advance	
Kristinn Thorarinsson	200 m individual medley	2:06.90	15	—N/a		did not advance	

Girls

Athlete	Event	Heat		Final	
Athlete	Event	Time	Rank	Time	Rank
Sunneva Fridriksdottir	400 m freestyle	4:32.75	29	did not advance	
Sunneva Fridriksdottir	800 m freestyle	—N/a		9:28.68	27
