= Percy Olivares =

Peruvian footballer (born 1968)

Personal information
- Full name: Percy Celso Olivares Polanco
- Date of birth: 5 June 1968 (age 58)
- Place of birth: Lima, Peru
- Height: 1.78 m (5 ft 10 in)
- Position: Left-back

Senior career*
Years	Team	Apps	(Gls)
1986–1990	Sporting Cristal		
1991	Deportivo Cali		
1991	Sporting Cristal		
1992–1993	1. FC Nürnberg	19	(4)
1993–1995	Tenerife	24	(2)
1996	Rosario Central	14	(0)
1996	Fluminense	0	(0)
1997	Cruz Azul	13	(0)
1997–1999	PAOK	58	(6)
1999–2001	Panathinaikos	43	(2)
2001	Universitario	9	(0)
2002	Dallas Burn	5	(0)
2003	Sporting Cristal	8	(0)
2005	Alianza Atlético	7	(0)

International career
1987–2001	Peru	83	(1)
- * Club domestic league appearances and goals

Percy Celso Olivares Polanco (born 5 June 1968) is a Peruvian former professional footballer who played as a left-back.

He is the father of footballer Christopher Olivares.

== Club career ==
Born in Lima, Olivares started playing professionally with hometown's Sporting Cristal, moving to Deportivo Cali in Colombia in 1991 but returning to his first club shortly after. In August 1992 he joined 1. FC Nürnberg in the Bundesliga, appearing in slightly more of the league's matches but scoring four goals in five games in October/November 1992 – three of those in 2–1 wins – as the Bavarian club barely retained its division status, finishing in 13th position but only two points clear of the relegation zone.

Subsequently, Olivares signed for CD Tenerife in Spain, being sparingly used in two-and-a-half La Liga seasons (no games whatsoever in his last, with the Canary Islands team qualifying for the UEFA Cup) and partnering compatriot José del Solar. In January 1996 he left for Rosario Central in Argentina, representing in quick succession Fluminense FC and Cruz Azul.

Olivares moved teams and countries again in the 1997 summer, spending the following four seasons in Greece, with PAOK FC and Panathinaikos FC. On 21 November 1999, while playing for the latter, he scored against Olympiacos F.C. in a local derby, the first win for the club in three years, but failed to win any silverware during his spell in the country.

After a stint in the United States, Olivares returned to Peru, where he represented first club Sporting Cristal and Alianza Atlético. He retired from the game at 37, making a short comeback two years later with FC Thun in Switzerland.

== International career ==
Olivares obtained 83 international caps for Peru, scoring once. He made his debut on 19 June 1987 against Chile (1–3), and played his last international match on 2 June 2001, against Ecuador (1–2), three days before his 33rd birthday.

Olivares represented the nation in seven Copa América tournaments, helping it to the quarterfinals in the 1993 edition in Ecuador. Additionally, he played in 31 FIFA World Cup qualifying matches.
