= Park Ji-young =

- Hangul: 박지영
- RR: Bak Jiyeong
- MR: Pak Chiyŏng

Park Ji-young (Korean: 박지영) is a Korean name consisting of the family name Park and the given name Ji-young, and may also refer to:

- Park Ji-young (actress) (born 1968), South Korean actress
- Park Ji-yeong (judoka) (born 1971), South Korean judoka
- Park Ji-young, birth name of the singer Kahi

== See also ==
- Park Jin-young (disambiguation)
