= Cape Verde at the 2014 Summer Youth Olympics =

- IOC code: CPV
- NOC: Comité Olímpico Caboverdeano

in Nanjing
- Competitors: 20 in 3 sports

Summer Youth Olympics appearances
- 2010; 2014; 2018

Cape Verde competed at the 2014 Summer Youth Olympics, in Nanjing, China from 16 August to 28 August 2014.

== Athletics ==
Cape Verde qualified one athlete.

Qualification Legend: Q=Final A (medal); qB=Final B (non-medal); qC=Final C (non-medal); qD=Final D (non-medal); qE=Final E (non-medal)

Girls
Track & road events

Athlete	Event	Heats		Final	
Athlete	Event	Result	Rank	Result	Rank
Paula Brito	400 m	58.85	17 qC	57.91	16

== Football ==
Cape Verde are scheduled to compete in the boys' tournament.

=== Boys' Tournament ===
Roster

- Amilton Borges Silveira Mendonca
- Jose Luis Brito Fortes
- Ricardo da Luz Fortes
- Kelvin Delgado Medina
- Wilson Fernandes Teixeira
- Antonio Ferreira Vaz
- Jason Goncalves Rocha
- Joao Lopes Miranda
- Andradino Moniz Garcia
- Edgar Moreno Mendes
- Kenny Nascimento Gomes
- Dennis Oliveira Ribeiro
- Mario Pasquinha Evora
- Fabio Ramos de Brito
- Paulo Rebelo Figueiredo Soares
- Erick Silva Goncalves
- Tiago Vaz Fonseca
- Adilson Vaz Semedo

Group Stage

Team	Pld	W	D	L	GF	GA	GD	Pts
South Korea	2	2	0	0	14	0	+14	6
Cape Verde	2	1	0	1	7	6	+1	3
Vanuatu	2	0	0	2	1	16	−15	0

15 August 2014
20:45 CST

Cape Verde	0–5	South Korea
	Report	4' Gyuhyeong Kim; 23' Wooyeong Jeong; 36', 69' Hwimin Joo; 59' Seongjun Kim

Jiangning Sports Center, Nanjing
Referee: Daniel Fedorczuk (Uruguay)

21 August 2014
20:45 CST

Vanuatu	1–7	Cape Verde
11' Jules Bororoa		2' Kenny Nascimento Gomes; 6', 72' Andradino de Jesus Moniz Garcia; 8', 19', 58' Ricardo Antonio da Luz Fortes; 67' Kelvin Daniel Delgado Medina

Jiangning Sports Center, Nanjing

Knockout Stage

Semifinals	Final / BM	Rank
Opposition Score	Opposition Score	Rank
Peru; L 1–3	Iceland; L 0–4	4

== Taekwondo ==
Cape Verde was given a wild card to compete.

Girls

Athlete	Event	Round of 16	Quarterfinals	Semifinals	Final	Rank
Athlete	Event	Opposition Result	Opposition Result	Opposition Result	Opposition Result	Rank
Jocilene Costa	+63 kg	Yuliia Miiuts (UKR); DSQ	did not advance			
