= Badminton at the 2014 Summer Youth Olympics – Girls' singles =

Girls' singles at the II Summer Youth Olympic Games
- Venue: Nanjing Sport Institute
- Dates: 17 – 22 August 2014
- Competitors: 32 from 31 nations

Medalists
1st place, gold medalist(s)		He Bingjiao	China
2nd place, silver medalist(s)		Akane Yamaguchi	Japan
3rd place, bronze medalist(s)		Busanan Ongbamrungphan	Thailand

The girls' singles badminton event at the 2014 Summer Youth Olympics were held at Nanjing Sport Institute. The 32 qualified athletes were split into 8 groups, with four players each. In their groups, they play a one-way round-robin and the first of each group qualifies to the quarterfinals, where they play a knock-out stage until the medal matches.

== Group play ==
=== Groups ===
Group A		Group B		Group C		Group D	
Seed	Athlete	Seed	Athlete	Seed	Athlete	Seed	Athlete
1; 31; 27; 9	Akane Yamaguchi (JPN) Chlorie Cadeau (SEY); Thilini Hendahewa (SRI); Mia Blichfeldt (DEN)	12; 21; 7; 23	Ruselli Hartawan (INA) Joy Lai (AUS); Gadde Ruthvika Shivani (IND); Magda Konieczna (POL)	10; 15; 18; 4	Maja Pavlinić (CRO) Vladyslava Lesnaya (UKR); Lee Chia-hsin (TPE); Qin Jinjing (CHN)	19; 17; 5; 30	Kim Ga-eun (KOR) Aliye Demirbağ (TUR); Liang Xiaoyu (SIN); Tessa Kabelo (BOT)
Group E		Group F		Group G		Group H	
Seed	Athlete	Seed	Athlete	Seed	Athlete	Seed	Athlete
14; 26; 29; 6	Mariya Mitsova (BUL) Kristin Kuuba (EST); Ng Tsz Yau (HKG); Luise Heim (GER)	13; 16; 3; 32	Alida Chen (NED) Lole Courtois (FRA); Busanan Ongbamrungphan (THA); Rugshaar Ishaak (SUR)	20; 22; 8; 28	Sabrina Solis (MEX) Daniela Macías (PER); Clara Azurmendi (ESP); Doha Hany (EGY)	11; 24; 2; 25	Lee Ying Ying (MAS) Janine Lais (AUT); He Bingjiao (CHN); Katarina Beton (SLO)

=== Results ===
Key to colours in group tables
Player advancing to knockout stage

==== Group A ====
Athlete	Matches			Sets			Points		
Athlete	W	L	Tot	W	L	Diff	W	L	Diff
Akane Yamaguchi (JPN)	3	0	3	6	0	+6	0	0	0
Thilini Hendahewa (SRI)	2	1	3	4	2	+2	0	0	0
Mia Blichfeldt (DEN)	1	2	3	2	4	-2	0	0	0
Chlorie Cadeau (SEY)	0	3	3	0	6	-6	0	0	0

Sunday, 17 August
11:55
Akane Yamaguchi (JPN)	2-0	Chlorie Cadeau (SEY)	21–2, 21–1	18min	Court 1
14:05
Thilini Hendahewa (SRI)	2-0	Mia Blichfeldt (DEN)	21-18, 21-15	40min	Court 2
Monday, 18 August
11:55
Akane Yamaguchi (JPN)	2-0	Thilini Hendahewa (SRI)	21–13, 21–6	25min	Court 1
13:30
Mia Blichfeldt (DEN)	2-0	Chlorie Cadeau (SEY)	21-5, 21-2	18min	Court 2
Tuesday, 19 August
11:55
Akane Yamaguchi (JPN)	2-0	Mia Blichfeldt (DEN)	21-12, 22-20	38min	Court 1
13:30
Thilini Hendahewa (SRI)	2-0	Chlorie Cadeau (SEY)	21-3, 21-6	20min	Court 3

==== Group B ====
Athlete	Matches			Sets			Points		
Athlete	W	L	Tot	W	L	Diff	W	L	Diff
Ruselli Hartawan (INA)	3	0	3	6	0	+6	0	0	0
Gadde Ruthvika Shivani (IND)	2	1	3	4	2	+2	0	0	0
Joy Lai (AUS)	1	2	3	2	4	-2	0	0	0
Magda Konieczna (POL)	0	3	3	0	6	-6	0	0	0

Sunday, 17 August
09:35
Ruselli Hartawan (INA)	2-0	Joy Lai (AUS)	21–13, 22–20	26min	Court 2
10:10
Gadde Ruthvika Shivani (IND)	2-0	Magda Konieczna (POL)	21-10, 21-4	22min	Court 1
Monday, 18 August
14:40
Ruselli Hartawan (INA)	2-0	Magda Konieczna (POL)	21–13, 21–10	23min	Court 2
15:15
Gadde Ruthvika Shivani (IND)	2-0	Joy Lai (AUS)	21-18, 21-11	30min	Court 1
Tuesday, 19 August
10:45
Joy Lai (AUS)	2-0	Magda Konieczna (POL)	21-17, 21-4	27min	Court 2
13:30
Ruselli Hartawan (INA)	2-0	Gadde Ruthvika Shivani (IND)	21-14, 21-15	30min	Court 2

==== Group C ====
Athlete	Matches			Sets			Points		
Athlete	W	L	Tot	W	L	Diff	W	L	Diff
Lee Chia-hsin (TPE)	3	0	3	6	0	+6	0	0	0
Qin Jinjing (CHN)	2	1	3	4	2	+2	0	0	0
Maja Pavlinić (CRO)	1	2	3	2	4	-2	0	0	0
Vladyslava Lesnaya (UKR)	0	3	3	0	6	-6	0	0	0

Sunday, 17 August
10:45
Maja Pavlinić (CRO)	2-0	Vladyslava Lesnaya (UKR)	21–12, 21–14	37min	Court 3
14:05
Lee Chia-hsin (TPE)	2-0	Qin Jinjing (CHN)	21-19, 21-13	47min	Court 1
Monday, 18 August
13:30
Qin Jinjing (CHN)	2-0	Vladyslava Lesnaya (UKR)	21–8, 21–7	26min	Court 3
14:40
Lee Chia-hsin (TPE)	2-0	Maja Pavlinić (CRO)	21-17, 21-13	36min	Court 1
Tuesday, 19 August
13:30
Qin Jinjing (CHN)	2-0	Maja Pavlinić (CRO)	21-7, 21-13	27min	Court 1
15:15
Lee Chia-hsin (TPE)	2-0	Vladyslava Lesnaya (UKR)	21-5, 21-6	20min	Court 2

==== Group D ====
Athlete	Matches			Sets			Points		
Athlete	W	L	Tot	W	L	Diff	W	L	Diff
Kim Ga-eun (KOR)	3	0	3	6	0	+6	0	0	0
Liang Xiaoyu (SIN)	2	1	3	4	2	+2	0	0	0
Aliye Demirbağ (TUR)	1	2	3	2	4	-2	0	0	0
Tessa Kabelo (BOT)	0	3	3	0	6	-6	0	0	0

Sunday, 17 August
10:10
Kim Ga-eun (KOR)	2-0	Aliye Demirbağ (TUR)	21–12, 21–16	27min	Court 3
14:05
Liang Xiaoyu (SIN)	2-0	Tessa Kabelo (BOT)	21-1, 21-3	19min	Court 3
Monday, 18 August
09:00
Kim Ga-eun (KOR)	2-0	Liang Xiaoyu (SIN)	21–15, 21–16	37min	Court 1
14:05
Aliye Demirbağ (TUR)	2-0	Tessa Kabelo (BOT)	21-9, 21-9	19min	Court 3
Tuesday, 19 August
09:00
Kim Ga-eun (KOR)	2-0	Tessa Kabelo (BOT)	21-14, 21-2	18min	Court 1
15:15
Liang Xiaoyu (SIN)	2-0	Aliye Demirbağ (TUR)	21-6, 21-10	25min	Court 3

==== Group E ====
Athlete	Matches			Sets			Points		
Athlete	W	L	Tot	W	L	Diff	W	L	Diff
Ng Tsz Yau (HKG)	3	0	3	6	0	+6	0	0	0
Luise Heim (GER)	2	1	3	4	2	+2	0	0	0
Mariya Mitsova (BUL)	1	2	3	2	4	-2	0	0	0
Kristin Kuuba (EST)	0	3	3	0	6	-6	0	0	0

Sunday, 17 August
09:00
Mariya Mitsova (BUL)	2-0	Kristin Kuuba (EST)	21–11, 21–15	24min	Court 2
10:45
Ng Tsz Yau (HKG)	2-0	Luise Heim (GER)	21-18, 21-13	34min	Court 1
Monday, 18 August
14:05
Ng Tsz Yau (HKG)	2-0	Mariya Mitsova (BUL)	21–18, 24–22	34min	Court 2
15:15
Luise Heim (GER)	2-0	Kristin Kuuba (EST)	21-11, 21-12	27min	Court 2
Tuesday, 19 August
09:00
Ng Tsz Yau (HKG)	2-0	Kristin Kuuba (EST)	21-17, 21-10	26min	Court 3
14:05
Luise Heim (GER)	2-0	Mariya Mitsova (BUL)	21-17, 21-13	30min	Court 2

==== Group F ====
Athlete	Matches			Sets			Points		
Athlete	W	L	Tot	W	L	Diff	W	L	Diff
Busanan Ongbamrungphan (THA)	3	0	3	6	0	+6	0	0	0
Alida Chen (NED)	2	1	3	4	3	+1	0	0	0
Lole Courtois (FRA)	1	2	3	3	4	-1	0	0	0
Rugshaar Ishaak (SUR)	0	3	3	0	6	-6	0	0	0

Sunday, 17 August
11:20
Alida Chen (NED)	2-1	Lole Courtois (FRA)	18-21, 21–14, 21–15	50min	Court 3
15:50
Busanan Ongbamrungphan (THA)	2-0	Rugshaar Ishaak (SUR)	21-1, 21-6	20min	Court 3
Monday, 18 August
10:45
Alida Chen (NED)	2-0	Rugshaar Ishaak (SUR)	21–6, 21–4	18min	Court 2
16:25
Busanan Ongbamrungphan (THA)	2-0	Lole Courtois (FRA)	21-8, 21-7	25min	Court 1
Tuesday, 19 August
10:10
Busanan Ongbamrungphan (THA)	2-0	Alida Chen (NED)	21-6, 21-8	24min	Court 1
16:25
Lole Courtois (FRA)	2-0	Rugshaar Ishaak (SUR)	21-12, 21-16	25min	Court 1

==== Group G ====
Athlete	Matches			Sets			Points		
Athlete	W	L	Tot	W	L	Diff	W	L	Diff
Clara Azurmendi (ESP)	3	0	3	6	0	+6	0	0	0
Sabrina Solis (MEX)	2	1	3	4	2	+2	0	0	0
Daniela Macías (PER)	1	2	3	2	4	-2	0	0	0
Doha Hany (EGY)	0	3	3	0	6	-6	0	0	0

Sunday, 17 August
14:40
Sabrina Solis (MEX)	2-0	Daniela Macías (PER)	21–19, 21–15	33min	Court 2
15:15
Clara Azurmendi (ESP)	2-0	Doha Hany (EGY)	21-5, 21-9	16min	Court 1
Monday, 18 August
09:00
Sabrina Solis (MEX)	2-0	Doha Hany (EGY)	21–15, 21–18	27min	Court 3
09:35
Clara Azurmendi (ESP)	2-0	Daniela Macías (PER)	21-14, 21-15	30min	Court 2
Tuesday, 19 August
09:35
Clara Azurmendi (ESP)	2-0	Sabrina Solis (MEX)	21-16, 21-13	27min	Court 1
10:45
Daniela Macías (PER)	2-0	Doha Hany (EGY)	21-15, 21-9	22min	Court 3

==== Group H ====
Athlete	Matches			Sets			Points		
Athlete	W	L	Tot	W	L	Diff	W	L	Diff
He Bingjiao (CHN)	3	0	3	6	1	+5	0	0	0
Lee Ying Ying (MAS)	2	1	3	4	2	+2	0	0	0
Katarina Beton (SLO)	1	2	3	2	5	-3	0	0	0
Janine Lais (AUT)	0	3	3	2	6	-4	0	0	0

Sunday, 17 August
15:15
Lee Ying Ying (MAS)	2-0	Janine Lais (AUT)	21–13, 21–6	22min	Court 2
16:25
He Bingjiao (CHN)	2-0	Katarina Beton (SLO)	21-8, 21-11	25min	Court 1
Monday, 18 August
10:10
Lee Ying Ying (MAS)	2-0	Katarina Beton (SLO)	21–14, 21–10	25min	Court 2
15:50
He Bingjiao (CHN)	2-1	Janine Lais (AUT)	17-21, 21-11, 21-3	34min	Court 1
Tuesday, 19 August
11:20
He Bingjiao (CHN)	2-0	Lee Ying Ying (MAS)	21-18, 21-14	32min	Court 1
15:50
Katarina Beton (SLO)	2-1	Janine Lais (AUT)	14-21, 21-19, 21-19	41min	Court 1

== Knockout stage ==
Quarterfinals; Wednesday, 20 August
1	Akane Yamaguchi (JPN)	21	18	21
12	Ruselli Hartawan (INA)	6	21	11
18	Lee Chia-hsin (TPE)	21	21
19	Kim Ga-eun (KOR)	18	16
29	Ng Tsz Yau (HKG)	12	9
3	Busanan Ongbamrungphan (THA)	21	21
8	Clara Azurmendi (ESP)	18	16
2	He Bingjiao (CHN)	21	21

Semifinals; Thursday, 21 August
1	Akane Yamaguchi (JPN)	21	18	21
18	Lee Chia-hsin (TPE)	11	21	15
3	Busanan Ongbamrungphan (THA)	14	16
2	He Bingjiao (CHN)	21	21

Final; Friday, 22 August
1	Akane Yamaguchi (JPN)	24	21	17
2	He Bingjiao (CHN)	22	23	21

Bronze Medal Match; Friday, 22 August
18	Lee Chia-hsin (TPE)	7	12
3	Busanan Ongbamrungphan (THA)	21	21
