= José Inga =

Peruvian footballer (born 1999)

Personal information
- Full name: José María Alberto Inga Guerrero
- Date of birth: 7 October 1999 (age 27)
- Place of birth: Chulucanas, Peru
- Height: 1.85 m (6 ft 1 in)
- Position: Midfielder

Team information
- Current team: Deportivo Llacuabamba
- Number: 33

Youth career
- Alianza Lima
- 2008–2018: Sporting Cristal

Senior career*
Years	Team	Apps	(Gls)
2019–2022	Sporting Cristal	10	(0)
2019	→ Ayacucho (loan)	11	(1)
2021	→ Univ. San Martín (loan)	27	(0)
2022	→ Carlos Mannucci (loan)	28	(1)
2023	Alianza Universidad	0	(0)
2024	Deportivo Municipal	14	(0)
2024	Comerciantes Unidos	1	(0)
2025–	Deportivo Llacuabamba	19	(0)
- * Club domestic league appearances and goals as of 10:01, 4 January 2026 (UTC)

José María Alberto Inga Guerrero (born 7 October 1999) is a Peruvian footballer who plays as a midfielder for Peruvian Primera División side Deportivo Llacuabamba.

== Club career ==
=== Sporting Cristal ===
Inga is a product of Sporting Cristalhaving joined in 2008 after playing in the academy of Alianza Lima. Playing regularly for the club's reserve team, 19-year old Inga was loaned out to fellow league club Ayacucho FC on 26 June 2019 for the rest of the year, to gain more playing experience on a higher level.

Returning from the loan spell, Inga got his official debut for Sporting Cristal in the first game of 2020 against UTC Cajamarca, playing all 90 minutes. In January 2021, Inga was loaned out again, this time to Universidad San Martín for the 2021 season.

On 24 November 2021 it was confirmed, that Inga would play on loan at Carlos A. Mannucci for the 2022 season.

=== Alianza Universidad ===
In February 2023, Inga joined Peruvian Segunda División side Alianza Universidad.

=== Deportivo Llacuabamba ===
In March 2025, Inga joined Peruvian Segunda División side Deportivo Llacuabamba.
