= Jin-young =

- Hangul: 진영
- RR: Jinyeong
- MR: Chinyŏng

Jin-young (Korean: 진영), also spelled Jin-yeong or Jean-young, is a Korean given name.

People with this name include:

== Film and television ==
- Jung Jin-young (actor) (born 1964), South Korean actor
- Choi Jin-young (1970–2010), South Korean actor and singer
- Jang Jin-young (1972–2009), South Korean actress
- Son Jin-young (born 1985), South Korean actor and singer

== Singers ==
- Hyun Jin-young (born 1971), South Korean rapper
- J.Y. Park (also known as JYP or J.Y. Park) (born 1971), South Korean singer-songwriter and businessman
- Jang Jin-young (singer) (born 1983), South Korean singer and vocal trainer
- Hong Jin-young (born 1985), South Korean trot singer
- Son Jin-young (born 1985), South Korean singer
- Jung Jin-young (singer) (born 1991), South Korean singer, member of boy band B1A4
- Punch (singer) (born Bae Jin-yeong, 1993), South Korean singer
- Park Jin-young (born 1994), South Korean singer and actor, member of boy band Got7
- Woo Jin-young (born 1997), South Korean singer and rapper, member of boy band D1ce
- Bae Jin-young (born 2000), South Korean singer and actor, member of boy band CIX

== Sportspeople ==
- Kim Jin-yeong (cyclist) (born 1970), South Korean female cyclist
- Lee Jin-young (born 1980), South Korean baseball player
- Kwon Jin-young (born 1991), South Korean football player
- Ko Jin-young (born 1995), South Korean golfer
- Park Jin-young (swimmer) (born 1997), South Korean swimmer

== See also ==
- List of Korean given names
