= Martín Távara =

Peruvian footballer (born 1999)

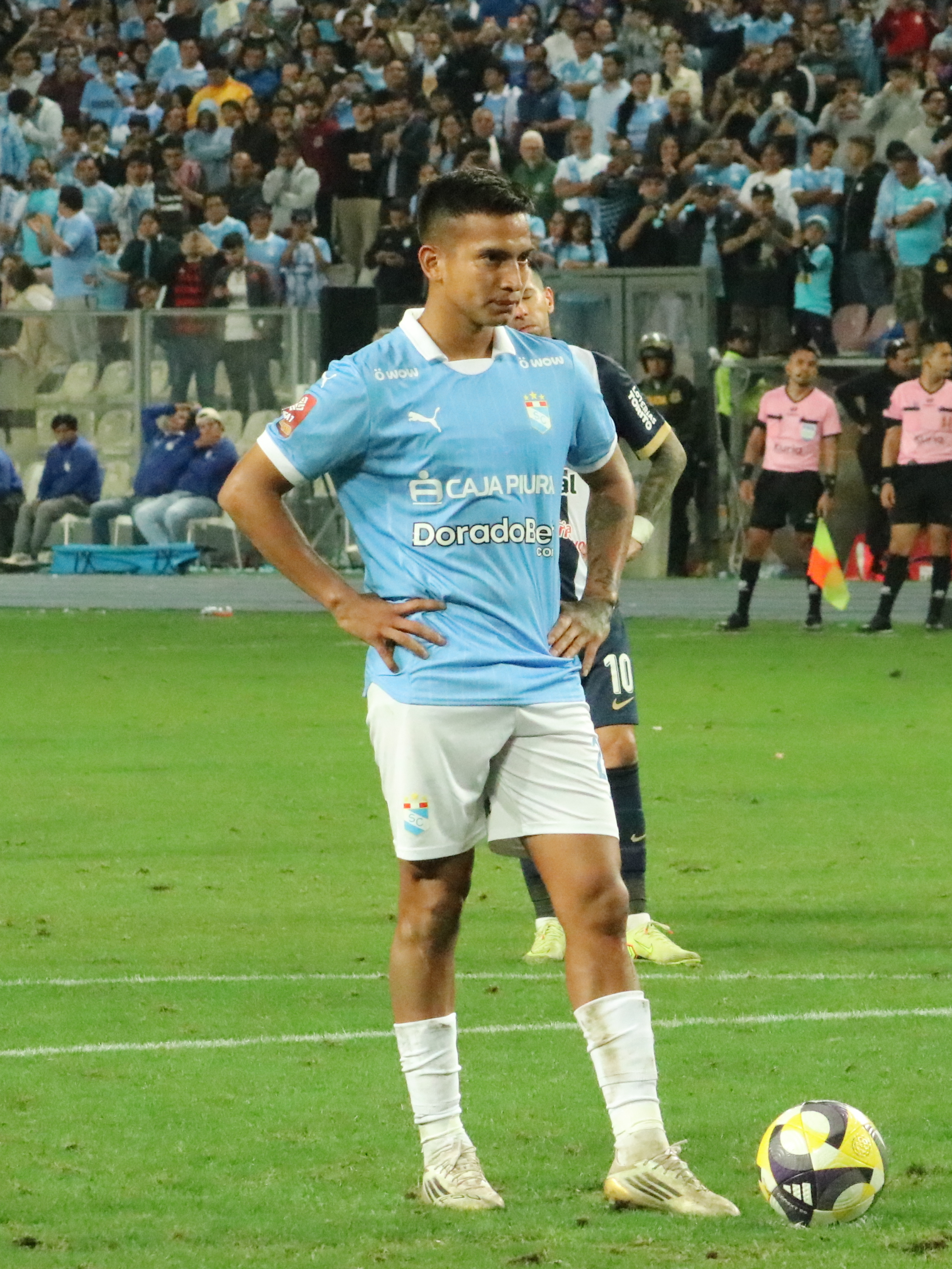

Personal information
- Full name: Gerald Martín Távara Mogollón
- Date of birth: 25 March 1999 (age 27)
- Place of birth: Sullana, Peru
- Height: 1.81 m (5 ft 11 in)
- Position: Midfielder

Team information
- Current team: Sporting Cristal
- Number: 25

Youth career
- 2010–2015: Sporting Cristal

Senior career*
Years	Team	Apps	(Gls)
2016–	Sporting Cristal	196	(26)
2017	→ UTC (loan)	2	(0)
2018	→ Sport Rosario (loan)	10	(1)

International career^{‡}
2015	Peru U17	4	(0)
2016–2019	Peru U20	7	(0)
2021–	Peru	6	(0)
- * Club domestic league appearances and goals as of 23:20, 7 November 2025 (UTC) ‡ National team caps and goals as of 23:21, 12 November 2025 (UTC)

Gerald Martín Távara Mogollón (born 25 March 1999) is a Peruvian football player who plays as midfielder for Sporting Cristal and the Peru national team.

== Club career ==
A product of the Sporting Cristal youth system, Martín Távara made his debut in the Peruvian first division on October 30, 2016, against Real Garcilaso (now Cusco FC). After winning the Peruvian league title in 2016, he was sent out on loan—first to UTC of Cajamarca in 2017 and then to Sport Rosario of Huaraz in 2018—due to a lack of playing time.

Back at Sporting Cristal, he won a second league title in 2020.

== International career ==
He was selected for Peru squad for the 2021 Copa América and made his debut on 12 June 2021 in a game against Brazil.

== Career statistics ==
=== International ===
As of match played 12 November 2025

Appearances and goals by national team and year
National team	Year	Apps	Goals
Peru	2021	2	0
Peru	2024	2	0
Peru	2025	2	0
Total		6	0

== Honours ==
Sporting Cristal

- Peruvian Primera División (2): 2016, 2020
- Copa Bicentenario: 2021
- Copa de la Liga: 2026

Peru U15

- Summer Youth Olympics: 2014
