= Rodolfo Angeles =

Peruvian footballer (born 1999)

Personal information
- Full name: Rodolfo Jesús Angeles Zuñiga
- Date of birth: 2 March 1999 (age 27)
- Place of birth: Lima, Peru
- Height: 1.75 m (5 ft 9 in)
- Position: Winger

Youth career
- Deportivo Municipal

Senior career*
Years	Team	Apps	(Gls)
2017–2020	Deportivo Municipal	2	(0)
2019	→ Santos (loan)	9	(0)
- * Club domestic league appearances and goals as of 19:55, 17 May 2020 (UTC)

Rodolfo Jesús Angeles Zuñiga (born 2 March 1999) is a Peruvian footballer who plays as a winger.

== Club career ==
=== Deportivo Municipal ===
Angeles got his Peruvian Primera División debut for Deportivo Municipal on 9 August 2017 against Real Garcilaso at the age of 18. Angeles played from the first minute, before being replaced in the 68th minute. He played a total of two games in the 2017 for the first team, including his debut. In the 2018 season, he made zero appearances for the first team, playing for the club's reserve team.

In the 2019 season, he was still playing with the reserves. Therefore, he was loaned out to Peruvian Segunda División club Santos de Nasca in the summer 2019 for the rest of the year. He made 9 appearances for the club, before returning to Municipal, where he was a part of the reserve team again for the 2020 season.
