= Vanuatu at the 2014 Summer Youth Olympics =

- IOC code: VAN
- NOC: Vanuatu Association of Sports and National Olympic Committee

in Nanjing
- Competitors: 21 in 3 sports
- Medals: Gold 0 Silver 0 Bronze 0 Total 0

Summer Youth Olympics appearances
- 2010; 2014; 2018

Vanuatu competed at the 2014 Summer Youth Olympics, in Nanjing, China from 16 August to 28 August 2014.

== Athletics ==
Vanuatu qualified one athlete.

Qualification Legend: Q=Final A (medal); qB=Final B (non-medal); qC=Final C (non-medal); qD=Final D (non-medal); qE=Final E (non-medal)

Boys
Track & road events

Athlete	Event	Heats		Final	
Athlete	Event	Result	Rank	Result	Rank
Dicki Mael	400 m	50.40	19 qC	DNS	

== Beach Volleyball ==
Vanuatu was given a team to compete from the tripartite committee.

Athletes	Event	Preliminary round	Standing	Round of 24	Round of 16	Quarterfinals	Semifinals	Final / BM	Rank
Athletes	Event	Opposition Score	Standing	Opposition Score	Opposition Score	Opposition Score	Opposition Score	Opposition Score	Rank
Floflo Daniel; Loti Joe	Girls'	Medina – Colon (PUR); L 0 – 2 (16–21, 14–21)	6	did not advance					
Floflo Daniel; Loti Joe	Girls'	Mukantambara – Uwimbabazi (RWA); L 2 – 0 (14–21, 19–21)	6	did not advance					
Floflo Daniel; Loti Joe	Girls'	Tapia – Verasio (ARG); L 2 – 0 (14–21, 12–21)	6	did not advance					
Floflo Daniel; Loti Joe	Girls'	Bell – Kendall (AUS); L 2 – 0 (13–21, 6–21)	6	did not advance					
Floflo Daniel; Loti Joe	Girls'	Makroguzova – Rudykh (RUS); L 2 – 0 (18–21, 15–21)	6	did not advance					

== Football ==
Vanuatu will compete in the boys' tournament.

=== Boys' Tournament ===
Roster

- Jules Bororoa
- Johnny Iwai
- William Kai
- Waiwo Kalmet
- Rufare Kalsal
- Rene Kuse
- Samuel Namatak
- Benson Rarua
- Leo Rau
- Terrence Roberts
- Lauren Saurei
- Dick Seth
- Zolostino Tanghwa
- Brian Taut
- Jelson Toara
- Micah Tommy
- Ronaldo Wilkins
- Vira Womal

Group Stage

Team	Pld	W	D	L	GF	GA	GD	Pts
South Korea	2	2	0	0	14	0	+14	6
Cape Verde	2	1	0	1	7	6	+1	3
Vanuatu	2	0	0	2	1	16	−15	0

18 August 2014
20:45 CST

South Korea	9–0	Vanuatu
Jeong Woo-yeong 10'; Kim Gyuhyeong 14', 26', 31', 59'; Rarua 56' (o.g.); Lee Jiyong 62', 68', 80+1'	Report

Jiangning Sports Center, Nanjing
Attendance: 9,653
Referee: Ricardo Montero (Costa Rica)

21 August 2014
20:45 CST

Vanuatu	1–7	Cape Verde
Bororoa 11'	Report	Nascimento Gomes 2'; Moniz Garcia 6' (pen.) da Luz Fortes 19', 58'; Delgado Medina 67'

Jiangning Sports Center, Nanjing
Attendance: 8,466
Referee: Sascha Amhof (Switzerland)

Placement 5–6

25 August 2014
20:45 CST

Honduras	5–0	Vanuatu
Mejia 2'; Archaga 15'; Castillo 21', 40+1', 64'	Report

Jiangning Sports Center, Nanjing
Attendance: 8,102
Referee: Abdelkader Zitouni (France)
