= Alex Þór Hauksson =

Icelandic footballer (born 1999)

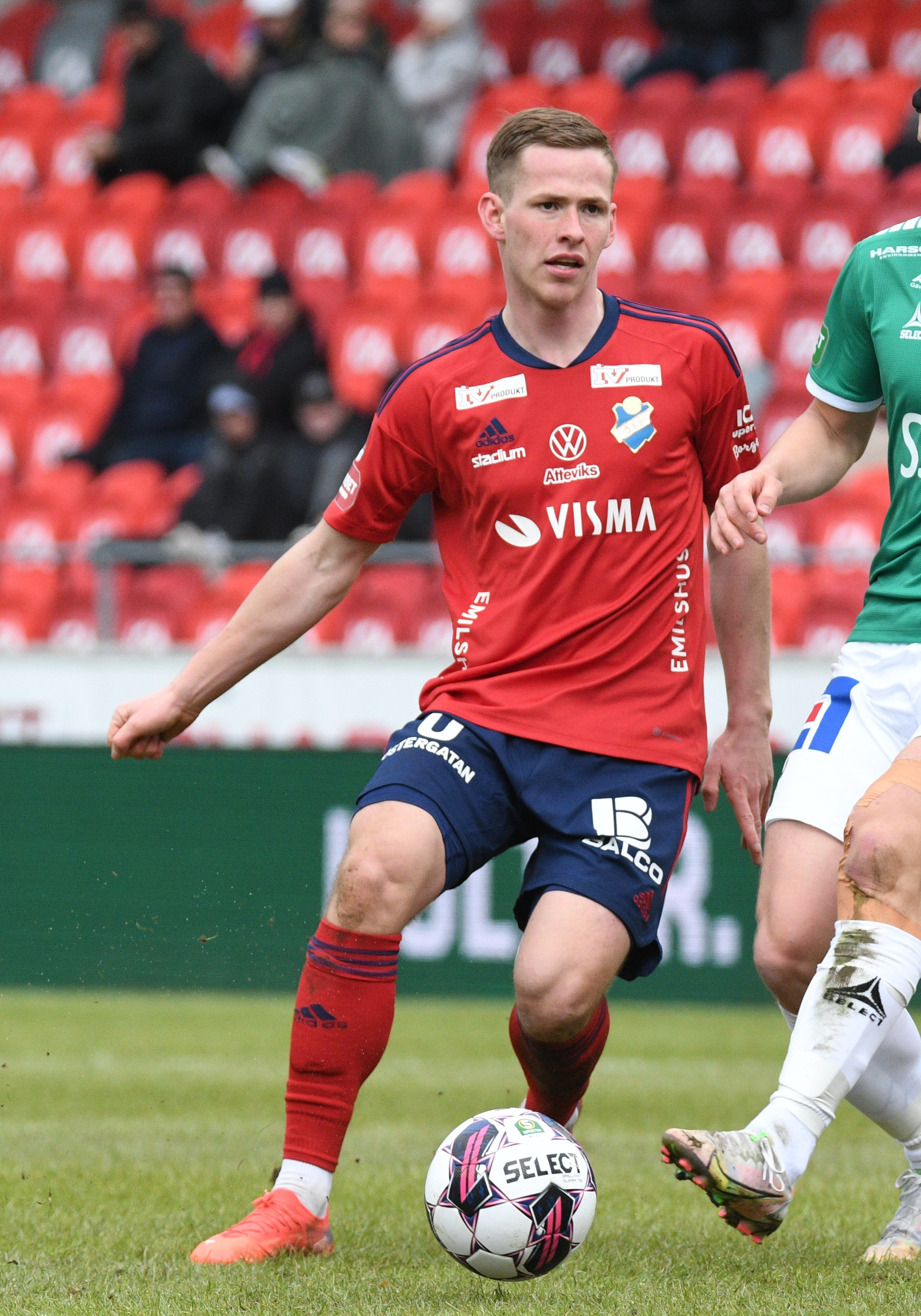

Personal information
- Date of birth: 26 November 1999 (age 26)
- Place of birth: Álftanes
- Height: 1.71 m (5 ft 7 in)
- Position: Midfielder

Team information
- Current team: Stjarnan
- Number: 29

Youth career
- –2015: Álftanes
- 2015–2017: Stjarnan

Senior career*
Years	Team	Apps	(Gls)
2012	Álftanes	1	(0)
2017–2020	Stjarnan	72	(5)
2021–2023	Öster	68	(5)
2024	KR	24	(1)
2025–	Stjarnan	38	(1)

International career^{‡}
2013–2014	Iceland U15	6	(0)
2015	Iceland U16	7	(0)
2015–2016	Iceland U17	8	(1)
2017	Iceland U19	5	(0)
2017–2021	Iceland U21	21	(1)
2019–2022	Iceland	4	(0)
- * Club domestic league appearances and goals as of 16 November 2026 ‡ National team caps and goals as of 22 April 2024

Alex Þór Hauksson (born 26 November 1999) is an Icelandic footballer who plays for Stjarnan.

== International ==
He made his debut for the Iceland national football team on 15 January 2019 in a friendly against Estonia, as a 69th-minute substitute for Aron Elís Þrándarson.
