= Park Jin-young (swimmer) =

South Korean swimmer

Personal information
- Born: 14 April 1997 (age 29) Incheon, South Korea

Korean name
- Hangul: 박진영
- RR: Bak Jinyeong
- MR: Pak Chinyŏng

Sport
- Sport: Swimming

Park Jin-young (Korean: 박진영; born 14 April 1997) is a South Korean swimmer. She competed in the women's 200 metre butterfly event at the 2016 Summer Olympics. In 2014, she represented South Korea at the 2014 Summer Youth Olympics held in Nanjing, China.
