= Kolbeinn Finnsson =

Icelandic footballer (born 1999)

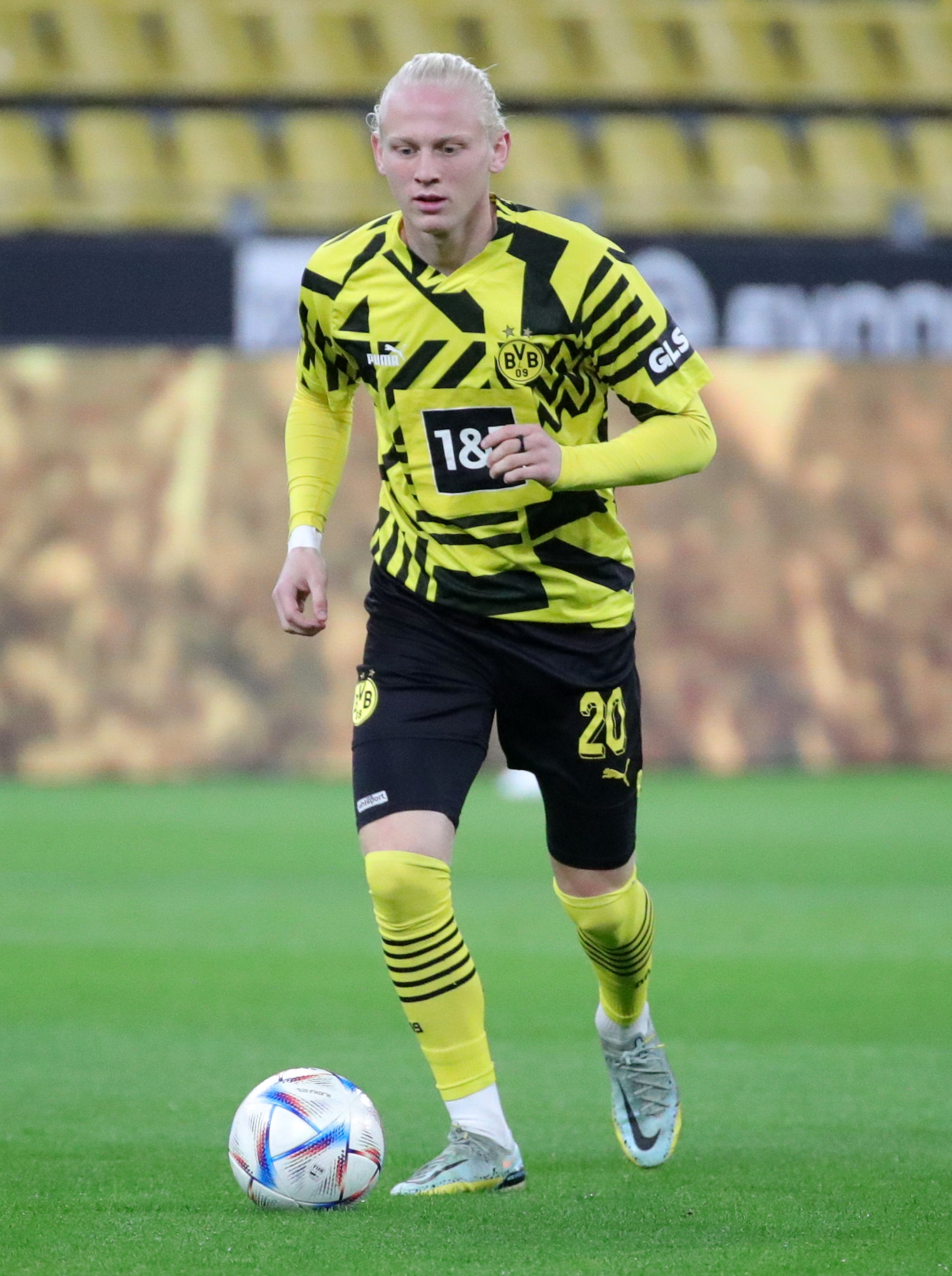
- Kolbeinn playing for Borussia Dortmund II in 2022

Personal information
- Full name: Kolbeinn Birgir Finnsson
- Date of birth: 25 August 1999 (age 27)
- Place of birth: Reykjavík, Iceland
- Height: 1.81 m (5 ft 11 in)
- Positions: Defender; midfielder

Team information
- Current team: Vålerenga
- Number: 2

Youth career
- –2015: Fylkir

Senior career*
| Years | Team | Apps | (Gls) |
| 2014–2015 | Fylkir | 9 | (0) |
| 2016–2018 | Jong Groningen | 22 | (0) |
| 2018–2019 | Brentford | 0 | (0) |
| 2019 | → Fylkir (loan) | 13 | (2) |
| 2019–2023 | Borussia Dortmund II | 78 | (4) |
| 2023–2024 | Lyngby | 50 | (3) |
| 2024–2026 | Utrecht | 5 | (0) |
| 2026 | → Vålerenga (loan) | 2 | (0) |
| 2026– | Vålerenga | 11 | (0) |

International career^{‡}
| 2013–2014 | Iceland U16 | 3 | (1) |
| 2014–2016 | Iceland U17 | 16 | (1) |
| 2016–2017 | Iceland U19 | 7 | (1) |
| 2018–2021 | Iceland U21 | 18 | (0) |
| 2019– | Iceland | 14 | (0) |
- * Club domestic league appearances and goals as of 15:08, 24 July 2026 (UTC) ‡ National team caps and goals as of 23:18, 11 October 2024 (UTC)

Kolbeinn Birgir Finnsson (born 25 August 1999) is an Icelandic professional footballer who plays for Eliteserien club Vålerenga as a defender or midfielder. He plays for the Iceland national team at international level.

A product of the Fylkir academy, Kolbeinn began his senior career with the club and transferred to FC Groningen in 2015, with whom he progressed into the reserve team. In 2018, he transferred to Brentford B, from whom he transferred to Borussia Dortmund II in 2019. Kolbeinn's break into first team football came with Danish club Lyngby in 2023, after which he transferred to Dutch club Utrecht in 2024. After failing to break into the starting lineup, Kolbeinn transferred to Norwegian club Vålerenga in 2026. He was capped by Iceland at youth level and made his full international debut in 2019.

== Club career ==
=== Fylkir ===
A midfielder, Kolbeinn began his career in his native Iceland in the Fylkir academy. His progression was such that he became the club's youngest-ever player when he made his debut at age 14 years and 229 days in a 3–0 group stage League Cup victory over Þróttur on 11 April 2014. Kolbeinn signed a new 2 1/2-year contract on 2 May 2015, he became the youngest player in the club's history to start a Úrvalsdeild match, when he made a late substitute appearance in a 1–1 draw with Fjölnir. Kolbeinn made 15 appearances during the 2015 season and departed the Fylkisvöllur in January 2016.

=== FC Groningen ===
On 27 October 2015, Kolbeinn moved to the Netherlands to join Eredivisie club FC Groningen on a 2 1/2-year contract, effective 1 January 2016. The transfer made him the youngest player to sign a contract with the club. He began his time with the club in the U17 and U19 teams, before progressing into the U23 team, for whom he made 24 Derde Divisie appearances during the 2016–17 and 2017–18 seasons. Kolbeinn was released when his contract expired at the end of the 2017–18 season.

=== Brentford ===
On 8 June 2018, Kolbeinn moved to England to transfer to the B team at Championship club Brentford. He signed a two-year contract, with the option for a further year, effective 1 July 2018. After making his international debut for Iceland in January 2019, Kolbeinn became Brentford B's first ever player to win an international cap without having yet made a first-team appearance for the club. On 17 February 2019, he won his only first team call up for an FA Cup fifth round match versus Swansea City and remained an unused substitute during the 4–1 defeat. Kolbeinn finished the B team season with 43 appearances and 9 goals and then returned to Úrvalsdeild club Fylkir on a two-month loan, which was subsequently extended by a further month. He made 15 appearances and scored two goals during his spell. After returning to Griffin Park and playing with the B team in Denmark in early August, he departed the club.

=== Borussia Dortmund II ===
On 20 August 2019, Kolbeinn moved to Germany to transfer to the reserve team at Borussia Dortmund on a three-year contract for an undisclosed fee. After making 18 appearances during the truncated 2019–20 season, he made 28 appearances and scored four goals during the team's Regionalliga West championship-winning 2020–21 season. During an injury-affected 2021–22 3. Liga season, Kolbeinn made 19 appearances without scoring. Entering the final months of his contract, Kolbeinn signed a one-year extension in March 2022. Over the course of his time with the club, Kolbeinn was developed into a left-sided utility player. Following 78 appearances and four goals, Kolbeinn departed the club in January 2023.

=== Lyngby ===
On 25 January 2023, Kolbeinn transferred to Danish Superliga club Lyngby and signed a 2 1/2-year contract. He made 48 appearances and scored three goals over the course of the 2022–23 and 2023–24 seasons, in both of which the club narrowly avoided relegation. After five early 2024–25 season appearances, Kolbeinn transferred out of the club.

=== Utrecht ===
On 21 August 2024, Kolbeinn transferred to Eredivisie club Utrecht and signed a three-year contract, with the option of a further year, for an undisclosed fee. Despite being a regular member of the matchday squad, Kolbeinn was unable to dislodge Souffian El Karouani from his starting place and made just eight appearances during the 2024–25 season, in which the club qualified for the Europa League. Again behind El Karouani during the 2025–26 season, Kolbeinn made just two appearances by February 2026.

=== Vålerenga ===
On 2 February 2026, Kolbeinn joined Eliteserien club Vålerenga on loan until 30 June 2026, with an option to buy. The buy option was triggered on 23 March and Kolbeinn signed a four-year contract for an undisclosed fee.

== International career ==
At youth international level, Kolbeinn was capped by the Iceland U16, U17, U19 and U21 teams. He was a part of the U16 squad which won the bronze medal at the 2014 Summer Youth Olympics. Kolbeinn was a member of Iceland's 2021 UEFA European U21 Championship finals squad and he made three appearances prior to the team's group stage exit.

Kolbeinn received his maiden call into the senior squad for a pair of friendly matches in Qatar in January 2019. He appeared in both, but was not called into the squad again until a pair of Euro 2024 qualifiers in September 2023. Kolbeinn appeared in both matches, which marked his competitive debut for the senior team.

== Personal life ==
Kolbeinn is the son of retired international footballer Finnur Kolbeinsson.

== Career statistics ==
=== Club ===
As of match played 16 July 2026

Appearances and goals by club, season and competition
| Club | Season | League | | | National cup (Note: Includes Icelandic Cup, FA Cup, Danish Cup, KNVB Cup) | | League cup (Note: Includes Icelandic League Cup, EFL Cup) | | Europe | | Total | |
| Club | Season | Division | Apps | Goals | Apps | Goals | Apps | Goals | Apps | Goals | Apps | Goals |
|---|---|---|---|---|---|---|---|---|---|---|---|---|
| Fylkir | 2014 | Úrvalsdeild | 0 | 0 | 0 | 0 | 1 | 0 | — | | 1 | 0 |
| Fylkir | 2015 | Úrvalsdeild | 9 | 0 | 2 | 0 | 4 | 0 | — | | 15 | 0 |
| Fylkir | Total | | 9 | 0 | 2 | 0 | 5 | 0 | — | | 16 | 0 |
| Jong Groningen | 2016–17 | Derde Divisie Saturday | 1 | 0 | — | | — | | — | | 1 | 0 |
| Jong Groningen | 2017–18 | Derde Divisie Saturday | 21 | 0 | — | | — | | — | | 21 | 0 |
| Jong Groningen | Total | | 22 | 0 | — | | — | | — | | 22 | 0 |
| Brentford | 2018–19 | Championship | 0 | 0 | 0 | 0 | 0 | 0 | — | | 0 | 0 |
| Fylkir (loan) | 2019 | Úrvalsdeild | 13 | 2 | 2 | 0 | — | | — | | 15 | 2 |
| Borussia Dortmund II | 2019–20 | Regionalliga West | 18 | 0 | — | | — | | — | | 18 | 0 |
| Borussia Dortmund II | 2020–21 | Regionalliga West | 28 | 4 | — | | — | | — | | 28 | 4 |
| Borussia Dortmund II | 2021–22 | 3. Liga | 19 | 0 | — | | — | | — | | 19 | 0 |
| Borussia Dortmund II | 2022–23 | 3. Liga | 13 | 0 | — | | — | | — | | 13 | 0 |
| Borussia Dortmund II | Total | | 78 | 4 | — | | — | | — | | 78 | 4 |
| Lyngby | 2022–23 | Danish Superliga | 15 | 1 | — | | — | | — | | 15 | 1 |
| Lyngby | 2023–24 | Danish Superliga | 30 | 2 | 3 | 0 | — | | — | | 33 | 2 |
| Lyngby | 2024–25 | Danish Superliga | 5 | 0 | — | | — | | — | | 5 | 0 |
| Lyngby | Total | | 50 | 3 | 3 | 0 | — | | — | | 53 | 3 |
| Utrecht | 2024–25 | Eredivisie | 5 | 0 | 3 | 0 | — | | — | | 8 | 0 |
| Utrecht | 2025–26 | Eredivisie | 0 | 0 | 1 | 0 | — | | 1 (Note: Appearance in Europa League) | 0 | 2 | 0 |
| Utrecht | Total | | 5 | 0 | 4 | 0 | — | | 1 | 0 | 10 | 0 |
| Vålerenga | 2026 | Eliteserien | 13 | 0 | 0 | 0 | — | | — | | 13 | 0 |
| Career total | | | 190 | 9 | 11 | 0 | 5 | 0 | 1 | 0 | 207 | 9 |

=== International ===
As of match played 11 October 2024

Appearances and goals by national team and year
| National team | Year | Apps | Goals |
|---|---|---|---|
| Iceland | 2019 | 2 | 0 |
| Iceland | 2023 | 5 | 0 |
| Iceland | 2024 | 7 | 0 |
| Total | | 14 | 0 |

== Honours ==
Brentford B

- Middlesex Senior Cup: 2018–19

Borussia Dortmund II

- Regionalliga West: 2020–21

Iceland U16

- 2014 Summer Youth Olympics: Bronze

Individual

- Saint-Joseph International Tournament Player of the Tournament: 2017
