= Fernando Pacheco (footballer, born 1999) =

Peruvian footballer (born 1999)

Personal information
- Full name: Fernando José Pacheco Rivas
- Date of birth: 26 June 1999 (age 27)
- Place of birth: Bujama Baja, Peru
- Height: 1.78 m (5 ft 10 in)
- Position: Winger

Team information
- Current team: Hapoel Ironi Kiryat Shmona
- Number: 8

Youth career
- 2011: FC Bujama Baja
- 2012–2016: Sporting Cristal

Senior career*
Years	Team	Apps	(Gls)
2016–2019	Sporting Cristal	76	(5)
2020–2021	Fluminense	27	(1)
2021	→ Juventude (loan)	16	(0)
2022–2025	Sporting Cristal	49	(5)
2022	→ Emmen (loan)	10	(0)
2023	→ Deportivo Municipal (loan)	10	(2)
2023	→ Cienciano (loan)	11	(1)
2026–	Hapoel Ironi Kiryat Shmona	11	(0)

International career^{‡}
2015	Peru U17	2	(0)
2017–2019	Peru U20	7	(1)
2020–	Peru U23	8	(1)
- * Club domestic league appearances and goals as of 24 June 2026 ‡ National team caps and goals as of 21:39, 30 January 2020 (UTC)

Fernando José Pacheco Rivas (born 26 June 1999) is a Peruvian professional footballer who plays for Israeli club Hapoel Ironi Kiryat Shmona, as a winger.

== Club career ==
=== Sporting Cristal ===
Born in Bujama Baja, Mala, Cañete, Pacheco joined Sporting Cristal's youth setup at the age of 14. He made his first team debut on 20 August 2016 at the age of just 17, starting in a 1–0 home win against Unión Comercio.

Pacheco scored his first professional goal on 3 March 2018, in a 5–0 routing of Universidad San Martín de Porres.

=== Fluminense ===
On 13 January 2020, Pacheco moved abroad and signed a four-year contract with Campeonato Brasileiro Série A side Fluminense.

=== Emmen ===
On 4 July 2022, Pacheco joined Emmen in the Netherlands on a season-long loan.

== Honours ==
Sporting Cristal

- Peruvian Primera División: 2016, 2018
