= Jeong Woo-yeong =

South Korean footballer (born 1999)

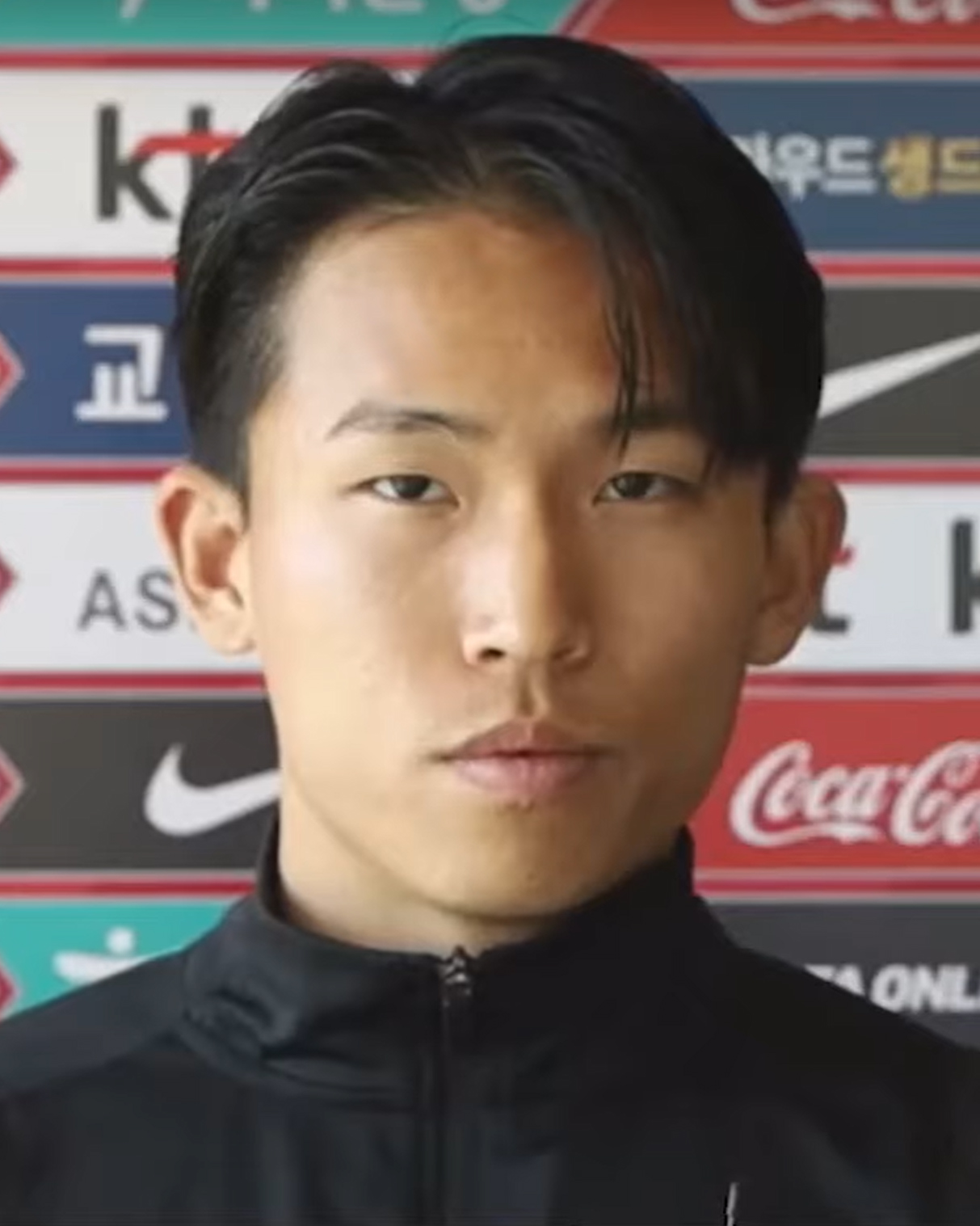
- Jeong in 2021

Personal information
- Full name: Jeong Woo-yeong
- Date of birth: 20 September 1999 (age 27)
- Place of birth: Incheon, South Korea
- Height: 1.79 m (5 ft 10 in)
- Positions: Attacking midfielder; forward

Team information
- Current team: Union Berlin
- Number: 11

Youth career
- 2010–2017: Incheon United (Note: Played for Incheon United U12 from 2010 to 2011, Kwangsung Middle School from 2012 to 2014, and Incheon Daegun High School from 2015 to 2017, which were academies of Incheon United.)
- 2018: Bayern Munich

Senior career*
Years	Team	Apps	(Gls)
2018–2019	Bayern Munich II	29	(13)
2018–2019	Bayern Munich	1	(0)
2019–2023	SC Freiburg	84	(10)
2019	SC Freiburg II	6	(2)
2020	→ Bayern Munich II (loan)	15	(1)
2023–2025	VfB Stuttgart	26	(2)
2024–2025	→ Union Berlin (loan)	23	(3)
2025–	Union Berlin	38	(4)

International career^{‡}
2013	South Korea U14	7	(4)
2014–2016	South Korea U17	11	(3)
2017–2019	South Korea U20	3	(1)
2019–2023	South Korea U23	20	(11)
2021–	South Korea	23	(4)
Medal record
Men's football
Representing South Korea
Youth Olympic Games
Silver medal – second place	2014 Nanjing
Asian Games
Gold medal – first place	2022 Hangzhou
AFC U-23 Championship
Winner	2020 Thailand
Asian Youth Games
Gold medal – first place	2013 Nanjing
- * Club domestic league appearances and goals as of 21 November 2026 ‡ National team caps and goals as of 17 November 2026

- Jeong Woo-yeong
- Hangul: 정우영
- Hanja: 鄭優營
- RR: Jeong Uyeong
- MR: Chŏng Uyŏng
- IPA: [tɕʌŋ.u.jʌŋ]

Jeong Woo-yeong (Korean: 정우영; born 20 September 1999) is a South Korean professional footballer who plays as a attacking midfielder or forward for Bundesliga club Union Berlin and the South Korea national team.

== Club career ==
=== Bayern Munich ===
On 30 June 2017, Jeong signed for Bayern Munich from South Korean club Incheon United. The contract ran until 30 June 2022. Jeong officially joined Bayern on 1 January 2018. Jeong made his first team debut for Bayern Munich in the UEFA Champions League on 27 November 2018, coming on as a substitute in the 81st minute for Thomas Müller against Benfica. On 3 May 2019, he started as right winger and won the final of the season's Premier League International Cup for Bayern Munich's under-23 team, earning the first club international trophy of his career. He was substituted by Jannik Rochelt in the 68th minute.

=== SC Freiburg ===
On 19 June 2019, SC Freiburg announced the signing of Jeong on a four-year deal with the option for Bayern Munich to buy him back. On 10 August 2019, he made his Freiburg debut against Magdeburg in the 2019–20 DFB-Pokal. However, he didn't appear in the field after his debut, and returned to Bayern on a loan deal. He contributed to reserve team's title by showing outstanding performances including one goal and eight assists during 15 appearances in the 2019–20 3. Liga.

Jeong got opportunities as a substitute in the 2020–21 season, his second season with Freiburg. On 12 December 2020, Jeong scored his first Bundesliga goal against Arminia Bielefeld after replacing Vincenzo Grifo in the 86th minute. He became a starter in the 2021–22 season, helping Freiburg qualify for the UEFA Europa League. However, after Ritsu Dōan joined the team the next season, he was pushed to the bench again and attracted the interest of VfB Stuttgart.

=== VfB Stuttgart ===
On 11 July 2023, Jeong signed for fellow Bundesliga club VfB Stuttgart on a three-year contract. He played as a starter for Stuttgart in the first three matches, but usually played as a substitute after absenting for a month to participate in the 2022 Asian Games. On 4 May 2024, he scored his first goal in a 3–1 win over his former club Bayern Munich, which marked his club's first win against the latter since 2007.

=== Union Berlin ===
On 27 August 2024, Jeong moved on loan to Union Berlin. On 28 May 2025, Union made the transfer permanent.

== International career ==
On 25 March 2021, Jeong debuted for South Korea national team in a friendly match against Japan.

On 16 November 2021, Jeong scored his first goal for the national team in a 2022 FIFA World Cup qualification against Iraq.

Jeong played for South Korean under-24 team in the 2022 Asian Games, scoring eight goals in seven matches of the tournament. He became a champion and the top goalscorer of the Asian Games after playing a vital role in the team.

== Personal life ==
On 20 May 2025, Jeong announced his engagement to art director Lee Yeon-ji, the daughter of actor Lee Gwan-gi. The couple married on 15 June 2025, in Seoul.

== Career statistics ==
=== Club ===
As of match played 21 November 2026

Appearances and goals by club, season and competition
Club	Season	League			DFB-Pokal		Continental		Other		Total	
Club	Season	Division	Apps	Goals	Apps	Goals	Apps	Goals	Apps	Goals	Apps	Goals
Bayern Munich II	2018–19	Regionalliga Bayern	29	13	—		—		2 (Note: Appearances in Regionalliga promotion play-offs)	0	31	13
Bayern Munich	2018–19	Bundesliga	1	0	0	0	1 (Note: Appearance in UEFA Champions League)	0	0	0	2	0
SC Freiburg	2019–20	Bundesliga	0	0	1	0	—		—		1	0
SC Freiburg	2020–21	Bundesliga	26	4	2	0	—		—		28	4
SC Freiburg	2021–22	Bundesliga	32	5	5	0	—		—		37	5
SC Freiburg	2022–23	Bundesliga	26	1	3	0	5 (Note: Appearances in UEFA Europa League)	1	—		34	2
SC Freiburg	Total		84	10	11	0	5	1	—		100	11
SC Freiburg II	2019–20	Regionalliga Südwest	6	2	—		—		—		6	2
Bayern Munich II (loan)	2019–20	3. Liga	15	1	—		—		—		15	1
VfB Stuttgart	2023–24	Bundesliga	26	2	3	0	—		—		29	2
Union Berlin (loan)	2024–25	Bundesliga	23	3	0	0	—		—		23	3
Union Berlin	2025–26	Bundesliga	28	4	3	1	—		—		31	5
Union Berlin	2026–27	Bundesliga	10	0	2	0	—		—		12	0
Union Berlin	Total		38	4	5	1	—		—		43	5
Career total			222	35	19	1	6	1	2	0	249	37

=== International ===
As of match played 17 November 2026

Appearances and goals by national team and year
National team	Year	Apps	Goals
South Korea	2021	2	1
South Korea	2022	8	1
South Korea	2023	5	1
South Korea	2024	7	1
South Korea	2025	0	0
South Korea	2026	1	0
Total		23	4

Scores and results list South Korea's goal tally first, score column indicates score after each Jeong goal.

List of international goals scored by Jeong Woo-yeong
No.	Date	Venue	Opponent	Score	Result	Competition
1	16 November 2021	Thani bin Jassim Stadium, Al Rayyan, Qatar	Iraq	3–0	3–0	2022 FIFA World Cup qualification
2	10 June 2022	Suwon World Cup Stadium, Suwon, South Korea	Paraguay	2–2	2–2	Friendly
3	17 October 2023	Suwon World Cup Stadium, Suwon, South Korea	Vietnam	6–0	6–0	Friendly
4	25 January 2024	Al Janoub Stadium, Al Wakrah, Qatar	Malaysia	1–0	3–3	2023 AFC Asian Cup

== Honours ==
Bayern Munich II

- 3. Liga: 2019–20
- Regionalliga Bayern: 2018–19

Bayern Munich

- Bundesliga: 2018–19

SC Freiburg

- DFB-Pokal runner-up: 2021–22

South Korea U14

- Asian Youth Games: 2013

South Korea U17

- Summer Youth Olympics silver medal: 2014

South Korea U23

- Asian Games: 2022
- AFC U-23 Championship: 2020

Individual

- Asian Games top goalscorer: 2022
