= Jiangning Sports Center =

Football stadium in Nanjing, China

Jiangning Sports Centre Stadium
- Interactive map of Jiangning Sports Centre Stadium
- Location: Nanjing, China
- Coordinates: 31.914594°N 118.890846°E
- Capacity: 30,000

Tenant
- Nanjing Yoyo F.C.

Jiangning Sports Centre Stadium (Chinese: 江宁区体育中心) is a football stadium in Nanjing, China. It hosted the China League One side, Nanjing Yoyo F.C. until 2011, when the club was dissolved. The stadium holds 30,000 spectators.
