= Archery at the 2014 Summer Youth Olympics – Mixed team =

Mixed team archery at the II Summer Youth Olympic Games
- Pictogram for archery
- Venue: Fangshan Sports Training Base
- Date: 22–24 August 2014
- Competitors: 64 from 43 nations
- Teams: 32

Medalists
| 1st place, gold medalist(s) | | Li Jiaman | China |
| 1st place, gold medalist(s) | | Luis Gabriel Moreno | Philippines |
| 2nd place, silver medalist(s) | | Cynthia Freywald | Germany |
| 2nd place, silver medalist(s) | | Zarif Syahiir Zolkepeli | Malaysia |
| 3rd place, bronze medalist(s) | | Mirjam Tuokkola | Finland |
| 3rd place, bronze medalist(s) | | Eric Peters | Canada |

The mixed team archery competition at the 2014 Youth Summer Olympics took place from 22–24 August in Nanjing, China.

All 64 archers who qualified for the individual rounds entered the competition, which consisted of a 72-arrow 70m ranking round (60m for girls) followed by a knockout tournament based on the Olympic scoring system, with each match competed over four sets. Unlike other World Archery competitions, the mixed team competition is not competed by teams from the same nation, but from teams compiled on the basis of their total ranking round score in an attempt to make teams even.

== Schedule ==
All times are UTC+08:00.

| Event date | Event day | Starting time | Event details |
|---|---|---|---|
| August 22 | Friday | 09:00 | Boys' Individual Ranking Round; Girls' Individual Ranking Round |
| August 22 | Friday | 15:00 | 1/16 Finals |
| August 24 | Sunday | 09:30 | 1/8 Finals |
| August 24 | Sunday | 14:30 | Final Rounds |

== Results ==
=== Ranking rounds ===
| Rank | Female Archer | Score | Male Archer | Score | Total score |
|---|---|---|---|---|---|
| 1 | Sughrakhanim Mugabilzada (AZE) | 618 | Hiroki Muto (JPN) | 674 | 1292 |
| 2 | Lucy Tatafu (TGA) | 613 | Andreas Mayr (GER) | 678 | 1291 |
| 3 | Regina Romero (GUA) | 625 | Rick Martens (BEL) | 666 | 1291 |
| 4 | Ralitsa Gencheva (BUL) | 615 | Florian Faber (SUI) | 676 | 1291 |
| 5 | Jessica Sutton (AUS) | 624 | Elia Fregnan (ITA) | 667 | 1291 |
| 6 | Sviatlana Kazanskaya (BLR) | 614 | Han Yun-chien (TPE) | 676 | 1290 |
| 7 | Ana Machado (BRA) | 627 | Marek Szafran (POL) | 662 | 1289 |
| 8 | Verona Villegas (VEN) | 628 | Boris Balaz (SVK) | 661 | 1289 |
| 9 | Bianca Gotuaco (PHI) | 642 | Prennoy Murong (BAN) | 646 | 1288 |
| 10 | Miasa Koike (JPN) | 618 | Bradley Denny (GBR) | 670 | 1288 |
| 11 | Maya Raysin (ISR) | 620 | Mete Gazoz (TUR) | 667 | 1287 |
| 12 | Mirjam Tuokkola (FIN) | 633 | Eric Peters (CAN) | 653 | 1286 |
| 13 | Hema Latha Boda (IND) | 640 | Damyan Dachev (BUL) | 646 | 1286 |
| 14 | Bryony Pitman (GBR) | 634 | Aliaksei Dubrova (BLR) | 651 | 1285 |
| 15 | Cynthia Freywald (GER) | 630 | Muhamad Zarif Syahiir Zolkepeli (MAS) | 654 | 1284 |
| 16 | Ivana Laharnar (SLO) | 635 | Francisco Rodriguez Sas (ARG) | 649 | 1284 |
| 17 | Alexa Rivera (MEX) | 604 | Thomas Koenig (FRA) | 679 | 1283 |
| 18 | Rosangel Sainz (CUB) | 602 | Luis Tapia (MEX) | 681 | 1283 |
| 19 | Anisa Zamirova (TJK) | 599 | Jan van Tongeren (NED) | 682 | 1281 |
| 20 | Yasemin Ecem Anagoz (TUR) | 646 | Hendra Purnama (INA) | 633 | 1279 |
| 21 | Melanie Gaubil (FRA) | 663 | Gasper Strajhar (SLO) | 615 | 1278 |
| 22 | Sylwia Zyzanska (POL) | 643 | Anton Komar (UKR) | 634 | 1277 |
| 23 | Alicia Marin (ESP) | 664 | Ali El Ghrari (LBA) | 611 | 1275 |
| 24 | Li Jiaman (CHN) | 669 | Luis Gabriel Moreno (PHI) | 605 | 1274 |
| 25 | Viktoriia Oleksiuk (UKR) | 655 | Xander Reddig (NAM) | 616 | 1271 |
| 26 | Tanya Giaccheri (ITA) | 650 | Jose Capote (VEN) | 620 | 1270 |
| 27 | Fang Tzu-yun (TPE) | 651 | Nicholas Turner (AUS) | 618 | 1269 |
| 28 | Diananda Choirunisa (INA) | 673 | Min Thiha Kyaw (MYA) | 595 | 1268 |
| 29 | Aruzhan Abdrazak (KAZ) | 578 | Marcus Vinicius D'Almeida (BRA) | 683 | 1261 |
| 30 | Lee Eun-gyeong (KOR) | 681 | Seifeldin Elsehely (EGY) | 577 | 1258 |
| 31 | Hana Elsehely (EGY) | 518 | Atul Verma (IND) | 688 | 1206 |
| 32 | Merveille Zinsou (BEN) | 498 | Lee Woo-seok (KOR) | 704 | 1202 |

=== Elimination rounds ===
==== Finals ====
Semi-finals
24 | Li Jiaman (CHN); Luis Gabriel Moreno (PHI) | 2 | 2 | 1
12 | Mirjam Tuokkola (FIN); Eric Peters (CAN) | 0 | 0 | 1
3 | Regina Romero (GUA); Rick Martens (BEL) | 0 | 2 | 0 | 0
15 | Cynthia Freywald (GER); Muhamad Zarif Syahiir Zolkepeli (MAS) | 2 | 0 | 2 | 2

Gold medal match
24 | Li Jiaman (CHN); Luis Gabriel Moreno (PHI) | 2 | 2 | 2
15 | Cynthia Freywald (GER); Muhamad Zarif Syahiir Zolkepeli (MAS) | 0 | 0 | 0
Bronze medal match
12 | Mirjam Tuokkola (FIN); Eric Peters (CAN) | 0 | 2 | 2 | 2
3 | Regina Romero (GUA); Rick Martens (BEL) | 2 | 0 | 0 | 0

==== Top half ====
===== Section 1 =====
1st round
1 | Sughrakhanim Mugabilzada (AZE); Hiroki Muto (JPN) | 0 | 2 | 2 | 2
32 | Merveille Zinsou (BEN); Lee Woo-seok (KOR) | 2 | 0 | 0 | 0
17 | Alexa Rivera (MEX); Thomas Koenig (FRA) | 2 | 0 | 2 | 2
16 | Ivana Laharnar (SLO); Francisco Rodriguez Sas (ARG) | 0 | 2 | 0 | 0
9 | Bianca Gotuaco (PHI); Prennoy Murong (BAN) | 0 | 0 | 1
24 | Li Jiaman (CHN); Luis Gabriel Moreno (PHI) | 2 | 2 | 1
25 | Viktoriia Oleksiuk (UKR); Xander Reddig (NAM) | 0 | 0 | 0
8 | Verona Villegas (VEN); Boris Balaz (SVK) | 2 | 2 | 2

2nd round
1 | Sughrakhanim Mugabilzada (AZE); Hiroki Muto (JPN) | 0 | 2 | 0 | 2 | 1
17 | Alexa Rivera (MEX); Thomas Koenig (FRA) | 2 | 0 | 2 | 0 | 0
24 | Li Jiaman (CHN); Luis Gabriel Moreno (PHI) | 0 | 2 | 1 | 2
8 | Verona Villegas (VEN); Boris Balaz (SVK) | 2 | 0 | 1 | 0

Quarter finals
1 | Sughrakhanim Mugabilzada (AZE); Hiroki Muto (JPN) | 1 | 0 | 0
24 | Li Jiaman (CHN); Luis Gabriel Moreno (PHI) | 1 | 2 | 2

===== Section 2 =====
1st round
5 | Jessica Sutton (AUS); Elia Fregnan (ITA) | 2 | 0 | 2 | 1
28 | Diananda Choirunisa (INA); Min Thiha Kyaw (MYA) | 0 | 2 | 0 | 1
21 | Melanie Gaubil (FRA); Gasper Strajhar (SLO) | 0 | 1 | 1 | 2 | 0
12 | Mirjam Tuokkola (FIN); Eric Peters (CAN) | 2 | 1 | 1 | 0 | 1
13 | Hema Latha Boda (IND); Damyan Dachev (BUL) | 0 | 2 | 0 | 2 | 1
20 | Yasemin Ecem Anagoz (TUR); Hendra Purnama (INA) | 2 | 0 | 2 | 0 | 0
29 | Aruzhan Abdrazak (KAZ); Marcus Vinicius D'Almeida (BRA) | 2 | 2 | 2
4 | Ralitsa Gencheva (BUL); Florian Faber (SUI) | 0 | 0 | 0

2nd round
5 | Jessica Sutton (AUS); Elia Fregnan (ITA) | 0 | 0 | 0
12 | Mirjam Tuokkola (FIN); Eric Peters (CAN) | 2 | 2 | 2
13 | Hema Latha Boda (IND); Damyan Dachev (BUL) | 0 | 0 | 2 | 0
29 | Aruzhan Abdrazak (KAZ); Marcus Vinicius D'Almeida (BRA) | 2 | 2 | 0 | 2

Quarter finals
12 | Mirjam Tuokkola (FIN); Eric Peters (CAN) | 2 | 0 | 2 | 2
29 | Aruzhan Abdrazak (KAZ); Marcus Vinicius D'Almeida (BRA) | 0 | 2 | 0 | 0

==== Bottom half ====
===== Section 3 =====
1st round
3 | Regina Romero (GUA); Rick Martens (BEL) | 0 | 2 | 2 | 2
30 | Lee Eun-gyeong (KOR); Seifeldin Elsehely (EGY) | 2 | 0 | 0 | 0
19 | Anisa Zamirova (TJK); Jan van Tongeren (NED) | 0 | 2 | 0 | 1
14 | Bryony Pitman (GBR); Aliaksei Dubrova (BLR) | 2 | 0 | 2 | 1
11 | Maya Raysin (ISR); Mete Gazoz (TUR) | 0 | 0 | 2 | 2 | 1
22 | Sylwia Zyzanska (POL); Anton Komar (UKR) | 2 | 2 | 0 | 0 | 0
27 | Fang Tzu-yun (TPE); Nicholas Turner (AUS) | 0 | 2 | 0 | 0
6 | Sviatlana Kazanskaya (BLR); Han Yun-chien (TPE) | 2 | 0 | 2 | 2

2nd round
3 | Regina Romero (GUA); Rick Martens (BEL) | 1 | 2 | 2
14 | Bryony Pitman (GBR); Aliaksei Dubrova (BLR) | 1 | 0 | 0
11 | Maya Raysin (ISR); Mete Gazoz (TUR) | 0 | 2 | 0 | 2 | 0
6 | Sviatlana Kazanskaya (BLR); Han Yun-chien (TPE) | 2 | 0 | 2 | 0 | 1

Quarter finals
3 | Regina Romero (GUA); Rick Martens (BEL) | 2 | 0 | 2 | 2
6 | Sviatlana Kazanskaya (BLR); Han Yun-chien (TPE) | 0 | 2 | 0 | 0

===== Section 4 =====
1st round
7 | Ana Machado (BRA); Marek Szafran (POL) | 2 | 1 | 0 | 2
26 | Tanya Giaccheri (ITA); Jose Capote (VEN) | 0 | 1 | 2 | 0
23 | Alicia Marin (ESP); Ali El Ghrari (LBA) | 2 | 1 | 1 | 0 | 0
10 | Miasa Koike (JPN); Bradley Denny (GBR) | 0 | 1 | 1 | 2 | 1
15 | Cynthia Freywald (GER); Muhamad Zarif Syahiir Zolkepeli (MAS) | 2 | 0 | 2 | 1
18 | Rosangel Sainz (CUB); Luis Tapia (MEX) | 0 | 2 | 0 | 1
31 | Hana Elsehely (EGY); Atul Verma (IND) | 0 | 0 | 0
2 | Lucy Tatafu (TGA); Andreas Mayr (GER) | 2 | 2 | 2

2nd round
7 | Ana Machado (BRA); Marek Szafran (POL) | 0 | 1 | 1 | 0
10 | Miasa Koike (JPN); Bradley Denny (GBR) | 2 | 1 | 1 | 2
15 | Cynthia Freywald (GER); Muhamad Zarif Syahiir Zolkepeli (MAS) | 0 | 2 | 2 | 0 | 1
2 | Lucy Tatafu (TGA); Andreas Mayr (GER) | 2 | 0 | 0 | 2 | 0

Quarter finals
10 | Miasa Koike (JPN); Bradley Denny (GBR) | 2 | 0 | 0 | 2 | 0
15 | Cynthia Freywald (GER); Muhamad Zarif Syahiir Zolkepeli (MAS) | 0 | 2 | 2 | 0 | 1
