= Archery at the 2014 Summer Youth Olympics – Girls' individual =

Girls' individual archery at the II Summer Youth Olympic Games
- Venue: Fangshan Sports Training Base
- Date: 22–25 August 2014
- Competitors: 32 from 32 nations

Medalists
1st place, gold medalist(s)		Li Jiaman	China
2nd place, silver medalist(s)		Melanie Gaubil	France
3rd place, bronze medalist(s)		Lee Eun-gyeong	South Korea

The girls' individual archery event at the 2014 Summer Youth Olympics was held from 22 to 25 August 2014 at the Fangshan Sports Training Base in Nanjing, China. One of three recurve archery events which comprised the archery programme, it was the second time the girls' individual discipline was contested at Summer Youth Olympics. Thirty-two archers from thirty-two countries entered the competition, which was open to female archers born between 1 January 1997 and 31 December 1999. The defending champion was South Korea's Kwak Ye-ji, who was unable to defend her title due to the age limitations imposed on the event.

Li Jiaman of China defeated France's Melanie Gaubil in a one-arrow shoot-off in the final to win the gold medal. As runner-up Gaubil received the silver medal. South Korea's Lee Eun-gyeong, who was seeded first and set a new junior world record in the 72-arrow round, defeated Ana Machado of Brazil to win the bronze medal.

== Format ==
An official World Archery target is 122cm wide and is divided into ten evenly-spaced concentric rings. Shooting an arrow into the outermost ring scores one point; landing in the centre yellow circle earns the maximum ten points.

The girls' individual recurve event was an outdoor recurve target archery event. Held to World Archery-approved rules, the archers shot at a 122 cm-wide target from a distance of 60 metres, with between one and ten points being awarded for each arrow depending on how close it landed to the centre of the target. The competition took place over three days, with an initial ranking round being followed by a single-elimination tournament consisting of five rounds and concluding with two matches to determine the winners of the gold, silver, and bronze medals.

The ranking round was held on 22 August and determined the seeds for the elimination rounds. Each of the thirty-two archers shot a total of 72 arrows, the archer with the highest scoring total from her 72 arrows receiving the number one seed, the archer with the second highest total receiving second seed, and so on. In the event of a tie between two or more archers, the number of arrows shot in the central 10-ring of the target was taken into account, with the number of arrows shot within the inner-10 (or X) ring used as a second tiebreaker if necessary.

The format of the elimination and medal-deciding rounds followed the Archery Olympic Round set system. The elimination rounds began on 23 August with the 1/16 round and concluded two days later on 25 August, with the bronze and gold medal finals following on the same day. Each match consisted of a maximum of five sets, with archers each shooting three arrows per set. The archer with the greater score from their three arrows won the set, earning two set points. The archer with the lower score in each set received zero points. If the score was tied, each archer received one point. The first archer to reach six set points was declared the winner. If the match was tied at five set points each after the maximum five sets were played, a single tie-breaker arrow was used with the closest to centre of the target winning.

=== Schedule ===
Date	Time	Stage
Friday, 22 August 2014	09:00	Ranking Round
Saturday, 23 August 2014	09:00	1/16 eliminations
Saturday, 23 August 2014	14:00	1/16 eliminations
Monday, 25 August 2014	09:30	1/8 eliminations
Monday, 25 August 2014	15:00 - 17:10	Quarter-finals
Monday, 25 August 2014	15:00 - 17:10	Semi-finals
Monday, 25 August 2014	15:00 - 17:10	Bronze medal match
Monday, 25 August 2014	15:00 - 17:10	Gold medal match
All times are China Standard Time (UTC+08:00); Source:

== Report ==
=== Ranking round ===
South Korea's Lee Eun-gyeong topped the ranking round held on the morning of 22 August with a score of 681 points out of a maximum of 720. Her score set a new world record in the women's cadet category – which is contested by archers aged seventeen and under – by five points, beating the previous record set by Melanie Gaubil one month earlier. Diananda Choirunisa of Indonesia finished second, eight points behind Lee on 673 points, with China's Li Jiaman and Spain's Alicia Marín following on 669 and 664 points respectively. Gaubil ranked fifth and set a personal record with her tally of 663 points, the Frenchwoman competing despite suffering from an inflamed shoulder.

=== Elimination rounds ===
The elimination rounds commenced the following day, with the 1/16 round being held over two sessions on Saturday 23 August. The day saw few surprise results with each of the top ten seeded archers advancing to the last sixteen. Bianca Gotuaco of the Philippines was the highest ranked archer to falter in the opening knockout round, the eleventh seed losing to Japan's Miasa Koike in four sets during the afternoon session, which took place under calm and humid conditions. Fourteenth-seed Bryony Pitman of Great Britain was another to be eliminated by a lower-ranked archer in the first round, with the Briton being unable move her sight on either of her two bows to correct her shots, which were landing too low compared to the centre of the target. Her loss to nineteenth-seed Regina Romero of Guatemala would be her first of two in two days, Romero and Belgium's Rick Martens going on to defeat Pitman and her Belorussian partner Aliaksei Dubrova in the mixed team event twenty four hours later.

After the mixed-team competition was contested on 24 August, the girls' individual event resumed on the morning of 25 August for the 1/8 elimination round. Nerves claimed both Romero and Chinese Taipei's Fang Tzu-yun, Romero losing in straight sets to third-seed Li while Fang took Poland's Sylwia Zyzańska to five sets before bowing out after a one-arrow shoot-off. A shoot-off was also required to separate Koike and sixth-seed Viktoriia Oleksiuk and Diananda Choirunisa's tie with Brazil's Ana Machado, Koike and Machado defeating their higher-ranked opponents by each shooting into the central 10-ring.

The quarter-finals got underway in the afternoon of 25 August under cloudy skies with an air temperature of 30 °C. Lee, Gaubil, and Li each recorded comfortable victories to advance to the semi-finals, while Machado narrowly defeated tenth-seed Zyzańska in the final quarter-final match, the pair once again requiring a shoot-off to determine the victor. The first semi-final encounter between Lee and Gaubil followed shortly afterwards and ended in a surprise victory for the fifth-seeded Frenchwoman. Although Lee entered the match affected by injury, she was able to match Gaubil's consistency over the first four sets, neither scoring lower than 28 points. A score of 26-25 in the fifth set in Gaubil's favour however sealed the match, the Frenchwoman eliminating the number one seed from gold medal contention. Machado was meanwhile unable to pull off a surprise result of her own, losing to Li by three sets to one.

=== Medal matches ===
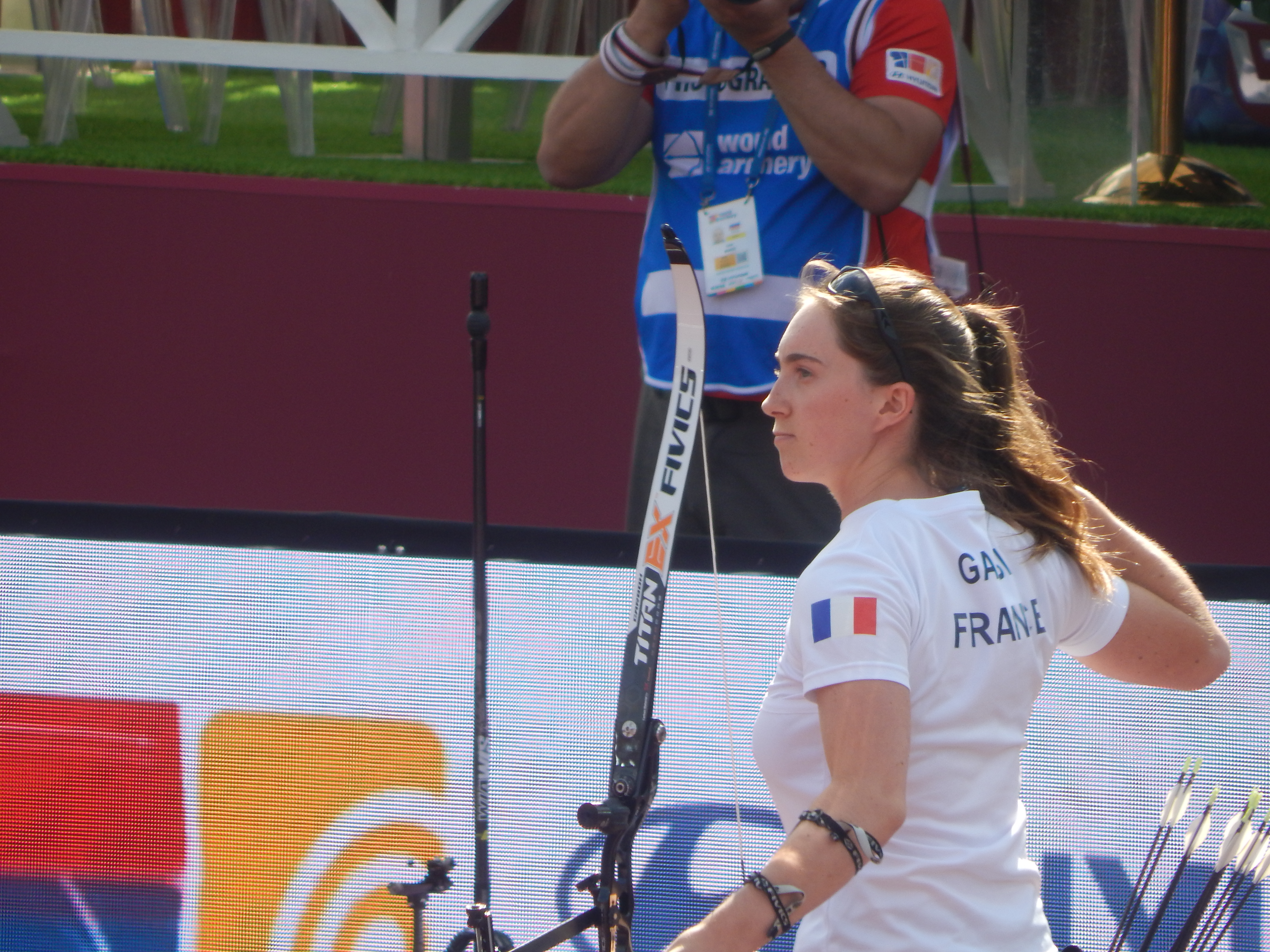
Melanie Gaubil (pictured at the 2019 Archery World Cup) won silver medal.

The bronze medal match was the first medal encounter to be decided. Lee took a comfortable victory over Machado by seven set points to one, the eighteenth seed able only to match Lee's shooting in the second set where the pair tied on twenty-seven points apiece. Machado's performance was nevertheless considered to have exceeded expectations, the Brazilian herself expressing surprise at how far she progressed in the competition, having returned to the sport just six months prior to the event.

The gold medal final was by contrast a close contest. Li and Gaubil each won two sets while tying in the third, forcing the match into a one-arrow shoot-off. Li shot first and scored a ten, while Gaubil's arrow landed wide of the centre of the target into the nine ring, giving Li victory and the gold medal. Li's win earned her a second gold medal of the Games after her victory in the mixed teams competition the previous day with partner Luis Gabriel Moreno of the Philippines. Afterwards Li spoke of the weight of expectation she felt as she prepared for the one-arrow shoot-off, saying "I felt that my parents, all my family members and the entire country were watching me, so I was really nervous. But I took a few seconds and calmed myself down." Gaubil meanwhile reflected that she found the final day of competition difficult with the quarter-final, semi-final, and gold medal match taking place in rapid succession, leaving little time for rest in between.

== Results ==
=== Ranking round ===
Rank	Archer	Half		Total	10s	Xs
Rank	Archer	1st	2nd	Total	10s	Xs
1	Lee Eun-gyeong (KOR)	341	340	681	35	3
2	Diananda Choirunisa (INA)	337	336	673	36	12
3	Li Jiaman (CHN)	335	334	669	30	11
4	Alicia Marín (ESP)	334	330	664	24	8
5	Melanie Gaubil (FRA)	331	332	663	31	14
6	Viktoriia Oleksiuk (UKR)	328	327	655	13	4
7	Fang Tzu-yun (TPE)	326	325	651	11	3
8	Tanya Giaccheri (ITA)	328	322	650	23	4
9	Yasemin Ecem Anagoz (TUR)	326	320	646	19	4
10	Sylwia Zyzańska (POL)	322	321	643	21	5
11	Bianca Gotuaco (PHI)	322	320	642	25	10
12	Hema Latha Boda (IND)	322	318	640	17	2
13	Ivana Laharnar (SLO)	319	316	635	18	7
14	Bryony Pitman (GBR)	321	313	634	14	4
15	Mirjam Tuokkola (FIN)	319	314	633	17	6
16	Cynthia Freywald (GER)	311	319	630	18	4
17	Verona Villegas (VEN)	315	313	628	14	8
18	Ana Machado (BRA)	311	316	627	23	8
19	Regina Romero (GUA)	304	321	625	15	3
20	Jessica Sutton (AUS)	313	311	624	16	4
21	Maya Raysin (ISR)	312	308	620	12	5
22	Miasa Koike (JPN)	309	309	618	14	4
23	Sughrakhanim Mugabilzada (AZE)	305	313	618	10	3
24	Ralitsa Gencheva (BUL)	304	311	615	14	6
25	Sviatlana Kazanskaya (BLR)	318	296	614	12	4
26	Lucy Tatafu (TGA)	308	305	613	13	8
27	Alexa Rivera (MEX)	295	309	604	15	4
28	Rosangel Sainz (CUB)	309	293	602	9	3
29	Anisa Zamirova (TJK)	306	293	599	11	2
30	Aruzhan Abdrazak (KAZ)	292	286	578	3	0
31	Hana Elsehely (EGY)	270	248	518	8	4
32	Merveille Zinsou (BEN)	247	251	498	6	2

=== Elimination rounds ===
==== Section 1 ====
1/16 eliminations
1	Lee Eun-gyeong (KOR)	6
32	Merveille Zinsou (BEN)	0
17	Verona Villegas (VEN)	6
16	Cynthia Freywald (GER)	2
9	Yasemin Ecem Anagoz (TUR)	6
24	Ralitsa Gencheva (BUL)	0
25	Sviatlana Kazanskaya (BLR)	2
8	Tanya Giaccheri (ITA)	6

1/8 eliminations
1	Lee Eun-gyeong (KOR)	6
17	Verona Villegas (VEN)	2
9	Yasemin Ecem Anagoz (TUR)	6
8	Tanya Giaccheri (ITA)	2

Quarter finals
1	Lee Eun-gyeong (KOR)	7
9	Yasemin Ecem Anagoz (TUR)	3

==== Section 2 ====
1/16 eliminations
5	Melanie Gaubil (FRA)	6
28	Rosangel Sainz (CUB)	2
21	Maya Raysin (ISR)	3
12	Hema Latha Boda (IND)	7
13	Ivana Laharnar (SLO)	6
20	Jessica Sutton (AUS)	2
29	Anisa Zamirova (TJK)	0
4	Alicia Marín (ESP)	6

1/8 eliminations
5	Melanie Gaubil (FRA)	6
12	Hema Latha Boda (IND)	0
13	Ivana Laharnar (SLO)	2
4	Alicia Marín (ESP)	6

Quarter finals
5	Melanie Gaubil (FRA)	6
4	Alicia Marín (ESP)	2

==== Section 3 ====
1/16 eliminations
3	Li Jiaman (CHN)	7
30	Aruzhan Abdrazak (KAZ)	3
19	Regina Romero (GUA)	6
14	Bryony Pitman (GBR)	4
11	Bianca Gotuaco (PHI)	2
22	Miasa Koike (JPN)	6
27	Alexa Rivera (MEX)	0
6	Viktoriia Oleksiuk (UKR)	6

1/8 eliminations
3	Li Jiaman (CHN)	6
19	Regina Romero (GUA)	0
22	Miasa Koike (JPN)	6*
6	Viktoriia Oleksiuk (UKR)	5

Quarter finals
3	Li Jiaman (CHN)	6
22	Miasa Koike (JPN)	0

==== Section 4 ====
1/16 eliminations
7	Fang Tzu-yun (TPE)	7
26	Lucy Tatafu (TGA)	1
23	Sughrakhanim Mugabilzada (AZE)	3
10	Sylwia Zyzańska (POL)	7
15	Mirjam Tuokkola (FIN)	3
18	Ana Machado (BRA)	7
31	Hana Elsehely (EGY)	0
2	Diananda Choirunisa (INA)	6

1/8 eliminations
7	Fang Tzu-yun (TPE)	5
10	Sylwia Zyzańska (POL)	6*
18	Ana Machado (BRA)	6*
2	Diananda Choirunisa (INA)	5

Quarter finals
10	Sylwia Zyzańska (POL)	5
18	Ana Machado (BRA)	6*

- Note: An asterisk (*) denotes a win from a one-arrow shoot-off
  Source:

=== Finals ===
Semifinals
1	Lee Eun-gyeong (KOR)	4	29	28	29	30	25
5	Melanie Gaubil (FRA)	6	29	29	29	29	26
3	Li Jiaman (CHN)	6	27	26	29	28
18	Ana Machado (BRA)	2	24	28	25	27

Finals
5	Melanie Gaubil (FRA) (silver)	5	28	28	29	29	28
3	Li Jiaman (CHN) (gold)	6*	29	25	29	27	30
Third place
1	Lee Eun-gyeong (KOR) (bronze)	7	28	27	29	29
18	Ana Machado (BRA)	1	25	27	28	27

- Note: An asterisk (*) denotes a win from a one-arrow shoot-off
  Source:

== See also ==
- Archery at the 2015 Summer Universiade – Women's individual recurve
- Archery at the 2016 Summer Olympics – Women's individual
