= China at the 2014 Summer Youth Olympics =

- IOC code: CHN
- NOC: Chinese Olympic Committee
- Website: www.olympic.cn (in Chinese and English)

in Nanjing
- Competitors: 123 in 28 sports
- Flag bearer: Dilana Dilixiati
- Medals Ranked 1st: Gold 38 Silver 13 Bronze 14 Total 65

Summer Youth Olympics appearances (overview)
- 2010; 2014; 2018; 2026

China competed at the 2014 Summer Youth Olympics, in Nanjing, China from 16 August to 28 August 2014 as the host country.

== Medalists ==
Medals by sport
Sport	1st place, gold medalist(s)	2nd place, silver medalist(s)	3rd place, bronze medalist(s)	Total
Swimming	10	5	2	17
Athletics	6	0	1	7
Diving	4	0	0	4
Gymnastics	3	3	1	7
Table tennis	3	0	0	3
Badminton	2	1	0	3
Weightlifting	2	0	0	2
Boxing	1	1	0	2
Archery	1	0	0	1
Field hockey	1	0	0	1
Football	1	0	0	1
Modern pentathlon	1	0	0	1
Sailing	1	0	0	1
Shooting	1	0	0	1
Tennis	1	0	0	1
Canoeing	0	1	1	2
Rowing	0	1	0	1
Wrestling	0	1	0	1
Taekwondo	0	0	4	4
Fencing	0	0	2	2
Basketball	0	0	1	1
Judo	0	0	1	1
Rugby sevens	0	0	1	1
Total	38	13	14	65

Medals awarded to participants of mixed-NOC (combined) teams are represented in italics. These medals are not counted towards the individual NOC medal tally.

Medal	Name	Sport	Event	Date
Gold	Li Zhuhao; Qiu Yuhan; Shen Duo; Yu Hexin	Swimming	Mixed 4 × 100 m freestyle relay	17 August
Gold	Meng Cheng	Weightlifting	Boys' −56 kg	17 August
Gold	Jang Huihua	Weightlifting	Girls' −48 kg	17 August
Gold	He Yun; Qiu Yuhan; Shen Duo; Zhang Yefei	Swimming	Girls' 4 × 100 m medley relay	18 August
Gold	Li Zhuhao	Swimming	Boys' 100 m butterfly	19 August
Gold	Shen Duo	Swimming	Girls' 100 m freestyle	19 August
Gold	Yang Haoran	Shooting	Boys' 10m air rifle	20 August
Gold	Yu Hexin	Swimming	Boys' 50 m freestyle	20 August
Gold	Shen Duo	Swimming	Girls' 200 m freestyle	20 August
Gold	Fan Zhendong	Table Tennis	Boys' singles	20 August
Gold	Liu Gaoyang	Table Tennis	Girls' singles	20 August
Gold	Zhu Xueying	Gymnastics	Girls' trampoline	21 August
Gold	Yu Hexin	Swimming	Boys' 50 m butterfly	21 August
Gold	He Yun; Qiu Yuhan; Shen Duo; Zhang Yefei	Swimming	Girls' 4 × 100 m freestyle relay	21 August
Gold	Shi Yuqi	Badminton	Boys' singles	22 August
Gold	He Bingjiao	Badminton	Girls' singles	22 August
Gold	Li Guangyuan	Swimming	Boys' 200 m backstroke	22 August
Gold	He Yun; Li Zhuhao; Yu Hexin; Zhang Yefei	Swimming	Mixed 4 × 100 m medley relay	22 August
Gold	Cheng Yulong	Athletics	Boys' discus throw	23 August
Gold	Liang Xiaojing	Athletics	Girls' 100 m	23 August
Gold	Ma Zhenxia	Athletics	Girls' 5 km walk	23 August
Gold	Sun Kangping	Athletics	Girls' discus throw	23 August
Gold	Wu Shengping	Diving	Girls' 10 m platform	23 August
Gold	Wang Yan	Gymnastics	Girls' vault	23 August
Gold	Zhong Xiuting	Modern pentathlon	Girls' individual	23 August
Gold	Liu Gaoyang; Fan Zhendong	Table Tennis	Mixed team	23 August
Gold	Li Jiaman	Archery	Mixed team	24 August
Gold	Xu Xinying	Athletics	Girls' hammer throw	24 August
Gold	Yang Hao	Diving	Boys' 3 m springboard	24 August
Gold	Wang Yan	Gymnastics	Girls' Balance Beam	24 August
Gold	Wu Linli	Sailing	Girls' Techno 293	24 August
Gold	Xu Shilin	Tennis	Girls' singles	24 August
Gold	Li Jiaman	Archery	Girls' individual	25 August
Gold	Xu Zhuhang	Athletics	Boys' 400 m hurdles	25 August
Gold	Wu Shengping	Diving	Girls' 3 m springboard	25 August
Gold	Chang Yuan	Boxing	Girls' -51 kg	26 August
Gold	Yang Hao	Diving	Boys' 10 m platform	26 August
Gold	China girls' national field hockey team: Chen Yang; Li Hong; Liu Kailin; Shen Yang; Tu Yidan; Zhang Jinrong; Zhang Lijia; Zhang Xindan; Zhong Jiaqi	Field Hockey	Girls' tournament	26 August
Gold	China girls' national football team: Chen Qiaozhu; Chen Xia; Fang Jie; Jin Kun; Li Qingtong; Ma Xiaolan; Tao Zhudan; Tu Linli; Wan Wenting; Wang Yanwen; Wu Xi; Xie Qiwen; Xu Huan; Yan Yingying; Zhan Ying; Zhang Jiayun; Zhao Yujie; Zheng Jie	Football	Girls' tournament	26 August
Silver	Zhang Yefei	Swimming	Girls' 200 m butterfly	18 August
Silver	Luo Yadan; Pan Jie	Rowing	Girls' pairs	20 August
Silver	Qiu Yuhan	Swimming	Girls' 200 m freestyle	20 August
Silver	He Yun	Swimming	Girls' 100 m breaststroke	20 August
Silver	Lin Guipu	Badminton	Boys' singles	22 August
Silver	Liu Changxin	Gymnastics	Boys' trampoline	22 August
Silver	Yu Hexin	Swimming	Boys' 100 m freestyle	22 August
Silver	Zhang Yefei	Swimming	Girls' 100 m butterfly	22 August
Silver	Ma Yue	Gymnastics	Boys' Rings	23 August
Silver	Ma Yue	Gymnastics	Boys' vault	24 August
Silver	Ye Qiuyu	Tennis	Mixed doubles	24 August
Silver	Pei Xingru	Wrestling	Girls' freestyle -60kg	26 August
Silver	Lyu Ping	Boxing	Boys' -52 kg	27 August
Silver	Yan Jiahua	Canoeing	Girls' K1 slalom	27 August
Silver	Wu Shengping	Diving	Mixed team	27 August
Bronze	Yan Yinghui	Fencing	Boys' sabre	17 August
Bronze	Huang Ali	Fencing	Girls' foil	17 August
Bronze	Wu Zhiqiang	Judo	Boys' -66 kg	17 August
Bronze	Li Guangyuan	Swimming	Boys' 100 m backstroke	18 August
Bronze	Zhan Tian Rui	Taekwondo	Girls' −49 kg	18 August
Bronze	China girls' national rugby sevens team: Gao Xue; Gao Yueying; Li Tian; Ling Chen; Liu Xiaoqian; Luo Yawen; Shen Yingying; Sun Caihong; Wang Tingting; Wu Fan; Yan Meiling; Yang Feifei	Rugby Sevens	Girls' tournament	20 August
Bronze	Zhang Chen	Taekwondo	Girls' −63 kg	20 August
Bronze	Fu Lei	Basketball	Boys' dunk contest	21 August
Bronze	Liu Jintao	Taekwondo	Boys' +73 kg	21 August
Bronze	Li Chen	Taekwondo	Girls' +63 kg	21 August
Bronze	He Bingjiao	Badminton	Mixed doubles	22 August
Bronze	Qiu Yuhan	Swimming	Girls' 100 m freestyle	22 August
Bronze	Wang Yan	Gymnastics	Girls' uneven bars	23 August
Bronze	Zhong Peifeng	Athletics	Boys' long jump	24 August
Bronze	Huang Song	Canoeing	Boys' K1 slalom	27 August

== Archery ==
As hosts China was given a quota to compete in both events, however they declined a spot in the boys' event.

Individual

Athlete	Event	Ranking round		Round of 32	Round of 16	Quarterfinals	Semifinals	Final / BM	Rank
Athlete	Event	Score	Seed	Opposition Score	Opposition Score	Opposition Score	Opposition Score	Opposition Score	Rank
Li Jiaman	Girls' individual	669	3	Abdrazak (KAZ); W 7–3	Romero (GUA); W 6–0	Koike (JPN); W 6–0	Machado (BRA); W 6–2	Gaubil (FRA); W 6–5	1st place, gold medalist(s)

Team

Athletes	Event	Ranking round		Round of 32	Round of 16	Quarterfinals	Semifinals	Final / BM	Rank
Athletes	Event	Score	Seed	Opposition Score	Opposition Score	Opposition Score	Opposition Score	Opposition Score	Rank
Li Jiaman (CHN); Luis Gabriel Moreno (PHI)	Mixed team	1274	24	Gotuaco (PHI); Murong (BAN); W 5-1	Villegas (VEN); Balaz (SVK); W 5-3	Mugabilzada (AZE); Muto (JPN); W 5-1	Tuokkola (FIN); Peters (CAN); W 5-1	Freywald (GER); Zolkepeli (MAS); W 6-0	1st place, gold medalist(s)

== Athletics ==
China qualified nine athletes.

Qualification Legend: Q=Final A (medal); qB=Final B (non-medal); qC=Final C (non-medal); qD=Final D (non-medal); qE=Final E (non-medal)

Boys
Track & road events

Athlete	Event	Heats		Final	
Athlete	Event	Result	Rank	Result	Rank
Xu Zhihang	400 m hurdles	50.79	1 Q	50.61 PB	1st place, gold medalist(s)
He Xianghong	10 km walk	—N/a		DNF	

Field events

Athlete	Event	Qualification		Final	
Athlete	Event	Distance	Rank	Distance	Rank
Peifeng Zhong	Long jump	7.18	6	7.37	3rd place, bronze medalist(s)
Yulong Cheng	Discus throw	59.88	1 Q	64.14 PB	1st place, gold medalist(s)
Xiang Jiabo	Javelin throw	68.48	11	66.24	12

Girls
Track & road events

Athlete	Event	Heats		Final	
Athlete	Event	Result	Rank	Result	Rank
Liang Xiaojing	100 m	11.64 =PB	2 Q	11.65	1st place, gold medalist(s)
Ma Zhenxia	5 km walk	—N/a		22:22.08 SB	1st place, gold medalist(s)

Field events

Athlete	Event	Qualification		Final	
Athlete	Event	Distance	Position	Distance	Position
Kangping Sun	Discus throw	46.57	6 Q	52.79 PB	1st place, gold medalist(s)
Xinying Xu	Hammer throw	68.19 PB	4 Q	68.35 PB	1st place, gold medalist(s)

Mixed events

Athletes	Event	Heats		Final	
Athletes	Event	Result	Rank	Result	Rank
Team 010; Xu Zhihang; China; Mazoon Al Alawi; Oman; Cecilia Tamayo; Mexico; Alex Rousseau-Jamard; France; Bader Alamrani; Saudi Arabia; Lea Navarro; France; Cheikh Beya; Mauritania; Yana Kachur; Ukraine	8×100 m relay mixed teams	1:43.45	5 Q	1:46.17	6

== Badminton ==
China qualified four athletes based on the 2 May 2014 BWF junior world rankings.

singles

Athlete	Event	Group stage				Quarterfinal	Semifinal	Final / BM	Rank
Athlete	Event	Opposition Score	Opposition Score	Opposition Score	Rank	Opposition Score	Opposition Score	Opposition Score	Rank
Shi Yuqi	Boys' singles	Ayittey (GHA); WO 2-0	Seo (KOR); W 2-0	Ong (SIN); W 2-0	1QF	Weisskirchen (GER); W 2-0	Joshi (IND); W 2-0	Lin (CHN); W 2-0	1st place, gold medalist(s)
Lin Guipu	Boys' singles	Lu (TPE); W 2-1	Coelho (BRA); W 2-0	Garrido (MEX); W 2-0	1QF	Lee (HKG); W 2-0	Ginting (INA); W 2-1	Shi (CHN); L 0-2	2nd place, silver medalist(s)
He Bingjiao	Girls' singles	Beton (SLO); W 2-0	Lais (AUT); W 2-1	Lee (MAS); W 2-0	1QF	Azurmendi (ESP); W 2-0	Ongbumrungpan (THA); W 2-0	Yamaguchi (JPN); W 2-1	1st place, gold medalist(s)
Qin Jinjing	Girls' singles	Lee (TPE); L 2-0	Lesnaya (UKR); W 2-0	Pavlinić (CRO); W 2-0	2	Did not advance			

doubles

Athlete	Event	Group stage				Quarterfinal	Semifinal	Final / BM	Rank
Athlete	Event	Opposition Score	Opposition Score	Opposition Score	Rank	Opposition Score	Opposition Score	Opposition Score	Rank
Joy Lai (AUS); Shi Yuqi (CHN)	Mixed doubles	Seo (KOR); Doha (EGY); W 2-1	Vlaar (NED); Lais (AUT); W 2-1	Coelho (BRA); Lesnaya (UKR); W 2-0	1QF	Tsuneyama (JPN); Lee (TPE); L 0-2	Did not advance		5
Kim Ga Eun (KOR); Lin Guipu (CHN)	Mixed doubles	Citron (FRA); Macias (PER); W 2-1	Gnedt (AUT); Solis (MEX); W 2-0	Cheam (MAS); Ng (HKG); L 0-2	2	Did not advance			
He Bingjiao (CHN); Sachin Angodavidanalage (SRI)	Mixed doubles	Mihigo (UGA); Courtois (FRA); W 2-0	Ong (SIN); Hendahewa (SRI); W 2-0	Ayittey (GHA); Gadde (IND); WO 2-0	1QF	Ginting (INA); Beton (SLO); W 2-1	Tsuneyama (JPN); Lee (TPE); L 1-2	Qin (CHN); Narongrit (THA); W 2-0	3rd place, bronze medalist(s)
Qin Jinjing (CHN); Mek Narongrit (THA)	Mixed doubles	Penalver (ESP); Cadeau (SEY); W 2-0	Mananga Nzoussi (CGO); Blichfeldt (DEN); W 2-0	Guda (AUS); Hartawan (INA); W 2-0	1QF	Krapez (SLO); Chen (NED); W 2-0	Cheam (MAS); Ng (HKG); L 0-2	He (CHN); Angodavidanalage (SRI); L 0-2	4

== Basketball ==
As hosts China was given a team to compete in both genders.

Skills Competition

Athlete	Event	Qualification				Final First Stage				Final Second Stage			
Athlete	Event	Round 1	Round 2	Total	Rank	Round 1	Round 2	Total	Rank	Round 1	Round 2	Total	Rank
Fu Lei	Boys' dunk contest	25	27	52	4 Q	25	23	48	3	Did not advance			3rd place, bronze medalist(s)

Athlete	Event	Qualification			Final		
Athlete	Event	Points	Time	Rank	Points	Time	Rank
Wang Zhen	Girls' Shoot-out Contest	4	25.3	25	Did not advance		

=== Boys' tournament ===
Roster

- Fu Lei
- Jiao Hailong
- Li Tiange
- Zhang Zhuo

Group Stage

Pos	Team	Pld	W	L	PF	PA	PD	Pts	Qualification
1	Lithuania	9	9	0	165	129	+36	18	Round of 16
2	Slovenia	9	7	2	152	120	+32	16	Round of 16
3	China	9	6	3	164	143	+21	15 (Note: CHN +1, PUR −1)	Round of 16
4	Puerto Rico	9	6	3	152	136	+16	15	Round of 16
5	Poland	9	5	4	153	127	+26	14	Round of 16
6	France	9	4	5	151	127	+24	13	Round of 16
7	Hungary	9	3	6	158	165	−7	12	Round of 16
8	Uruguay	9	2	7	103	154	−51	11 (Note: URU +1, GER −1)	Round of 16
9	Germany	9	2	7	118	149	−31	11	Eliminated
10	Indonesia	9	1	8	86	152	−66	10	Eliminated

Notes:

18 August 2014
17:20

Germany	18–15	China

Wutaishan Sports Center, Nanjing

18 August 2014
20:20

China	21–11	Uruguay

Wutaishan Sports Center, Nanjing

19 August 2014
19:20

Lithuania	18–14	China

Wutaishan Sports Center, Nanjing

20 August 2014
17:00

China	18–15	Poland

Wutaishan Sports Center, Nanjing

20 August 2014
20:20

France	18–19	China

Wutaishan Sports Center, Nanjing

22 August 2014
19:00

China	19–18	Puerto Rico

Wutaishan Sports Center, Nanjing

23 August 2014
17:00

Indonesia	10–22	China

Wutaishan Sports Center, Nanjing

23 August 2014
20:40

Slovenia	19–15	China

Wutaishan Sports Center, Nanjing

24 August 2014
20:00

China	21–16	Hungary

Wutaishan Sports Center, Nanjing

Knockout Stage

Round of 16	Quarterfinals	Semifinals	Final	Rank
Opposition Score	Opposition Score	Opposition Score	Opposition Score	Rank
Brazil; L 11-12	Did not advance			12

=== Girls' tournament ===
Roster

- Dilana Dilixiati
- Guo Zixuan
- Ha Wenxi
- Wang Zhen

Group Stage

Pos	Team	Pld	W	D	L	PF	PA	PD	Pts	Qualification
1	Netherlands	9	8	0	1	164	87	+77	24	Round of 16
2	Hungary	9	8	0	1	146	91	+55	24	Round of 16
3	Spain	9	7	0	2	151	95	+56	21	Round of 16
4	Estonia	9	5	0	4	130	109	+21	15	Round of 16
5	China	9	5	0	4	128	103	+25	15	Round of 16
6	Germany	9	4	0	5	111	133	−22	12	Round of 16
7	Brazil	9	3	0	6	101	123	−22	9	Round of 16
8	Venezuela	9	2	0	7	101	153	−52	6	Round of 16
9	Slovenia	9	2	0	7	120	156	−36	6	Eliminated
10	Syria	9	1	0	8	68	170	−102	3	Eliminated

18 August 2014
20:00

Netherlands	7–13	China

Wutaishan Sports Center, Nanjing

19 August 2014
18:00

Slovenia	18–20	China

Wutaishan Sports Center, Nanjing

19 August 2014
21:40

China	11–15	Estonia

Wutaishan Sports Center, Nanjing

20 August 2014
19:00

Venezuela	vs.	China

Wutaishan Sports Center, Nanjing

22 August 2014
17:00

China	20–7	Syria

Wutaishan Sports Center, Nanjing

22 August 2014
20:40

Hungary	vs.	China

Wutaishan Sports Center, Nanjing

23 August 2014
19:20

China	vs.	Spain

Wutaishan Sports Center, Nanjing

24 August 2014
17:00

Germany	6–18	China

Wutaishan Sports Center, Nanjing

24 August 2014
20:40

China	6–14	Brazil

Wutaishan Sports Center, Nanjing

Knockout Stage

Round of 16	Quarterfinals	Semifinals	Final	Rank
Opposition Score	Opposition Score	Opposition Score	Opposition Score	Rank
Czech Republic; W 15-12	Netherlands; L 13-21	Did not advance		5

== Beach volleyball ==
As hosts China was given a team to compete in both genders, but only selected to send a girls' team.

Athletes	Event	Preliminary round	Standing	Round of 24	Round of 16	Quarterfinals	Semifinals	Final / BM	Rank
Athletes	Event	Opposition Score	Standing	Opposition Score	Opposition Score	Opposition Score	Opposition Score	Opposition Score	Rank
Wang Jiaxi; Yuan Lvwen	Girls'	Andriani – Ragillia (INA); L 0 – 2 (17-21, 20-22)	5	Did not advance					
Wang Jiaxi; Yuan Lvwen	Girls'	Moyipele – Ndoungou (CGO); L INJ	5	Did not advance					
Wang Jiaxi; Yuan Lvwen	Girls'	Maida – Vargas (BOL); L 0 – 2	5	Did not advance					
Wang Jiaxi; Yuan Lvwen	Girls'	Davidson – Ward (TRI); W 2 – 0 (21-4, 21-14)	5	Did not advance					
Wang Jiaxi; Yuan Lvwen	Girls'	Arnholdt – Schneider (GER); L 2 – 0 (12-21, 8-21)	5	Did not advance					

== Boxing ==
As hosts China was given a male and female quota to compete. China later chose to compete in the boys' 52 kg and girls' 51 kg events.

Boys

Athlete	Event	Preliminaries	Semifinals	Final / RM	Rank
Athlete	Event	Opposition Result	Opposition Result	Opposition Result	Rank
Lyu Ping	-52 kg	Bye	Solanki (IND); W 3-0	Stevenson (USA); L 0-3	2nd place, silver medalist(s)

Girls

Athlete	Event	Preliminaries	Semifinals	Final / RM	Rank
Athlete	Event	Opposition Result	Opposition Result	Opposition Result	Rank
Chang Yuan	-51 kg	Huang (TPE); W 3–0	Grigoryan (ARM); W 3–0	Testa (ITA); W 3–0	1st place, gold medalist(s)

== Canoeing ==
Boys

Athlete	Event	Qualification		Repechage		Round of 16		Quarterfinals	Semifinals	Final / BM	Rank
Athlete	Event	Time	Rank	Time	Rank	Time	Rank	Opposition Result	Opposition Result	Opposition Result	Rank
Huang Song	K1 slalom								Grigar (SVK); L	Sunderland (GBR); W	3rd place, bronze medalist(s)
Huang Song	K1 sprint										

Girls

Athlete	Event	Qualification		Repechage		Round of 16		Quarterfinals	Semifinals	Final / BM	Rank
Athlete	Event	Time	Rank	Time	Rank	Time	Rank	Opposition Result	Opposition Result	Opposition Result	Rank
Yan Jiahua	K1 slalom								Jones (GER); W	Prigent (FRA); L	2nd place, silver medalist(s)
Yan Jiahua	K1 sprint										

== Cycling ==
As hosts China was given a team to compete in the boys' and girls' events, but only chose to compete in the girls' event.

Team

Athletes	Event	Cross-Country Eliminator		Time Trial			BMX		Cross-Country race			Road race			Total Pts	Rank
Athletes	Event	Rank	Points	Time	Rank	Points	Rank	Points	Time	Rank	Points	Time	Rank	Points	Total Pts	Rank
Sun Jiajun; Tan Jiale	Girls' Team															

Mixed relay

Athletes	Event	Cross-Country Girls' race	Cross-Country Boys' race	Boys' Road race	Girls' Road race	Total Time	Rank
Sun Jiajun (CHN); Tumelo Makae (LES); Malefetsane Lesofe (LES); Tan Jiale (CHN)	Mixed team relay						

== Diving ==
As hosts China was given a quota to compete in all of the events.

Athlete	Event	Preliminary		Final	
Athlete	Event	Points	Rank	Points	Rank
Yang Hao	Boys' 3 m springboard	597.70	1	613.80	1st place, gold medalist(s)
Yang Hao	Boys' 10 m platform	598.00	1	665.90	1st place, gold medalist(s)
Wu Shengping	Girls' 3 m springboard	472.25	1	492.05	1st place, gold medalist(s)
Wu Shengping	Girls' 10 m platform	535.50	1	526.20	1st place, gold medalist(s)
Veronika Lindahl (SWE); Yang Hao (CHN)	Mixed team	—N/a		299.85	9
Wu Shengping (CHN); Mohab Elkordy (EGY)	Mixed team	—N/a		374.90	2nd place, silver medalist(s)

== Equestrian ==
As hosts China was given one athlete to compete.

Athlete	horse	Event	Round 1		Round 2			Total	
Athlete	horse	Event	Penalties	Rank	Penalties	Total	Rank	Penalties	Rank
Li Yaofeng	Uriah	individual jumping	0	1					
Asia; Li Yaofeng (CHN); Sayaka Fujiwara (JPN); Igor Kozubaev (KGZ); Hamad Al Qadi (QAT); Hisham Alsuwayni (KSA)	Uriah; Lasino; Fever; Fernando; Quick Sylver	Team jumping	12; ~~13~~; ~~13~~; 0; 8	6	~~8~~; 0; ~~EL~~; 4; 4	28	6	28	6

== Fencing ==
China qualified three fencers based on its performance at the 2014 FIE Cadet World Championships.

Boys

Athlete	Event	Pool Round	Seed	Round of 16	Quarterfinals	Semifinals	Final / BM	Rank
Athlete	Event	Opposition Score	Seed	Opposition Score	Opposition Score	Opposition Score	Opposition Score	Rank
Huang Mengkai	foil	Heroui (ALG) Bianchi (ITA) Seo (KOR) Choi (HKG) El-Choueiri (LIB); W 5-0; A Rzadkowski (POL)		Haglund (USA); W 15-7				
Yan Yinghui	sabre	Al-Musawi (IRQ); W 5–2; Cucu (ROU) Kim (KOR) Ayman (EGY) Ilin (RUS) Alshamlan (KUW); W 5–2		Martino (ARG); W 15-12	Giakoumatos (GRE); W 15-11		Ferjani (TUN); W	3rd place, bronze medalist(s)

Girls

Athlete	Event	Pool Round	Seed	Round of 16	Quarterfinals	Semifinals	Final / BM	Rank
Athlete	Event	Opposition Score	Seed	Opposition Score	Opposition Score	Opposition Score	Opposition Score	Rank
Huang Ali	foil	Massialas (USA); W 5-2; Miyawaki (JPN) Guillaume (FRA) Cecchini (BRA) Pásztor (HUN) Clavijo (BOL); W 5-2			Cecchini (BRA); W 15-8	Massialas (USA); L 7-12	Martyanova (RUS); W 13-8	3rd place, bronze medalist(s)

Mixed team

Athletes	Event	Round of 16	Quarterfinals	Semifinals / PM	Final / PM	Rank
Athletes	Event	Opposition Score	Opposition Score	Opposition Score	Opposition Score	Rank
Asia-Oceania 2 Myeongki Kim (KOR); Yan Yinghui (CHN); Myeong Cheol Seo (KOR); Eunhye Jeon (KOR); Huang Ali (CHN); Miho Yoshimura (JPN)	Mixed team	Europe 3 W 30-26		Europe 1 L	Europe 2 L 25-30	4

== Field hockey ==
As the host nation, China has chosen to take part in the girls' tournament.

=== Girls' tournament ===
Roster

- Chen Yang
- Li Hong
- Liu Kailin
- Shen Yang
- Tu Yidan
- Zhang Jinrong
- Zhang Lijia
- Zhang Xindan
- Zhong Jiaqi

Group Stage

Pos	Team	Pld	W	D	L	GF	GA	GD	Pts	Qualification
1	China	4	4	0	0	29	3	+26	12	Quarterfinals
2	Uruguay	4	3	0	1	19	8	+11	9	Quarterfinals
3	New Zealand	4	2	0	2	20	20	0	6	Quarterfinals
4	Germany	4	1	0	3	8	23	−15	3	Quarterfinals
5	Zambia	4	0	0	4	8	30	−22	0	

Source: FIH
Rules for classification: 1) points; 2) goal difference; 3) goals scored; 4) head-to-head result.

17 August 2014
16:00

China	8–0	Zambia
Zhang Xindan 4', 16', 25'; Zhang Jinrong 18'; Tu Yidan 32'; Chen Yang 34'; Zhang Lijia 35'; Zhong Jiaqi 36'	Report

Umpires:
Toh Li Min (SIN)
Lucy Townend (NZL)

18 August 2014
20:30

China	2–0	Uruguay
Zhang Jinrong 10', 24'	Report

Umpires:
Tanja Schafer (RSA)
Ana Escalante (MEX)

20 August 2014
19:00

China	8–3	New Zealand
Zhang Jinrong 16', 27'; Zhang Lijia 17', 29'; Zhang Xindan 18'; Chen Yang 20'; Li Hong 23', 36'	Report	Brown 5'; Tinning 14'; Kwek 22'

Umpires:
Ana Faias (POR)
Emily Carroll (AUS)

21 August 2014
20:30

Germany	0–11	China
	Report	Zhang Jinrong 3', 4', 11', 29'; Tu Yidan 8', 10'; Zhong Jiaqi 9'; Li Hong 11', 31'; Chen Yang 15'; Zhang Xindan 28'

Umpires:
Denise Pelletier (CAN)
Lucy Townend (NZL)

Quarterfinal

23 August 2014
17:30

China	7–1	South Africa
Zhang Lijia 1', 3'; Zhang Xindan 2', 13', 24'; Li Hong 18'; Chen Yang 20'	Report	Esteves 6'

Umpires:
Denise Pelletier (CAN)
Toh Li Min (SIN)

Semifinal

24 August 2014
19:30

China	4–3	Japan
Zhang Lijia 4'; Zhang Xindan 10'; Zhang Jinrong 13', 19'	Report	Asai 1'; Mori 5', 12'

Umpires:
Emily Carroll (AUS)
Ana Faias (POR)

Gold medal match

26 August 2014
20:30

Netherlands	5–5	China (gold)
Zerbo 20'; Kerstholt 22'; Van Erk 25'; Veen 26'; Matla 28'	Report	Zhang Jinrong 2', 16'; Zhang Lijia 4'; Tu Yidan 8'; Zhang Xindan 29'
Penalties
Matla (penalty shoot-out scored); Wijsman (penalty shoot-out missed); Veen (penalty shoot-out scored)	2–3	(penalty shoot-out scored) Zhang Lijia; (penalty shoot-out scored) Li Hong; (penalty shoot-out scored) Zhang Jinrong

Umpires:
Ana Faias (POR)
Tanja Schafer (RSA)

== Football ==
As hosts China was given a spot to compete in the girls' tournament.

=== Girls' tournament ===
Roster

- Chen Qiaozhu
- Chen Xia
- Fang Jie
- Jin Kun
- Li Qingtong
- Ma Xiaolan
- Tao Zhudan
- Tu Linli
- Wan Wenting
- Wang Yanwen
- Wu Xi
- Xie Qiwen
- Xu Huan
- Yan Yingying
- Zhan Ying
- Zhang Jiayun
- Zhao Yujie
- Zheng Jie

Group stage

Team	Pld	W	D	L	GF	GA	GD	Pts
China	2	2	0	0	12	0	+12	6
Mexico	2	1	0	1	9	2	+7	3
Namibia	2	0	0	2	0	19	−19	0

14 August 2014
20:45 CST

China	2–0	Mexico
Zhao Yujie 10'; Jin Kun 35'	Report

Wutaishan Stadium, Nanjing
Referee: Morag Pirie (Great Britain)

20 August 2014
20:45

Namibia	0–10	China
	Report	Wan Wenting 9'; Zhang Jiayun 13', 62'; Ma Xiaolan 19', 24', 30', 45'; Jin Kun 43'; Wang Yanwen 54'; Fang Jie 66'

Wutaishan Stadium, Nanjing
Attendance: 4,350
Referee: Anna-Marie Keighley (New Zealand)

Semi-final

23 August 2014
20:45

China	0–0	Slovakia
	Report
Penalties
Zhao Yujie (penalty scored); Ma Xiaolan (penalty scored); Zhang Jiayun (penalty scored); Fang Jie (penalty scored)	4–2	(penalty missed) Martina Surnovska; (penalty missed) Tamara Gmitterova; (penalty scored) Maria Mikolajova; (penalty scored) Veronika Jancova

Wutaishan Stadium, Nanjing
Attendance: 4,690
Referee: Marilin Miranda (Paraguay)

Gold medal match

26 August 2014
20:45

Venezuela	0–5	China (gold)
	Report	Wan Wenting 10'; Xie Qiwen 19'; Ma Xiaolan 34'; Zhang Jiayun 45'; Wu Xi 80+1'

Wutaishan Stadium, Nanjing
Attendance: 11,678
Referee: Gladys Lengwe (Zambia)

== Golf ==
As hosts China was given a spot to compete in both genders, but only selected a male.

Individual

Athlete	Event	Round 1		Round 2			Round 3			Total	
Athlete	Event	Score	Rank	Score	Total	Rank	Score	Total	Rank	Score	Rank
Dou Ze-cheng	Boys	69	5								

Team

Athletes	Event	Round 1 (Fourball)		Round 2 (Foursome)		Round 3 (individual Stroke)				Total	
Athletes	Event	Score	Rank	Score	Rank	Boy	Girl	Total	Rank	Score	Rank
Dou Ze-cheng (CHN); Azelia Meichtry (SUI)	Mixed										

== Gymnastics ==
=== Artistic gymnastics ===
China qualified two athletes based on its performance at the 2014 Asian Artistic gymnastics Championships.

Boys

Athlete	Event	Apparatus						Total	Rank
Athlete	Event	F	PH	R	V	PB	HB	Total	Rank
Ma Yue	Qualification	13.650 11	13.450 10	14.250 1 Q	14.300 9 Q	13.100 12	11.700 28	80.475	8 Q
Ma Yue	all-around	14.300	13.650	14.000	14.450	13.350	12.300	82.050	5
Ma Yue	vault	—N/a						14.416	2nd place, silver medalist(s)
Ma Yue	Rings	—N/a						13.866	2nd place, silver medalist(s)

Girls

Athlete	Event	Apparatus				Total	Rank
Athlete	Event	V	UB	BB	F	Total	Rank
Wang Yan	Qualification	13.950 7 Q	13.250 1 Q	14.750 1 Q	11.150 33	53.200	4 Q
Wang Yan	all-around	14.650	11.950	13.400	13.800	53.800	4
Wang Yan	Balance Beam	—N/a				14.633	1st place, gold medalist(s)
Wang Yan	vault	—N/a				14.783	1st place, gold medalist(s)
Wang Yan	uneven bars	—N/a				13.066	3rd place, bronze medalist(s)

=== Trampoline ===
China qualified two athletes based on its performance at the 2014 Asian Trampoline Championships.

Athlete	Event	Qualification				Final	
Athlete	Event	Routine 1	Routine 2	Total	Rank	Score	Rank
Liu Changxin	Boys	45.605 1	57.260 1	102.865	1 Q	56.935	2nd place, silver medalist(s)
Zhu Xueying	Girls	41.855 5	54.890 1	96.845	1 Q	55.425	1st place, gold medalist(s)

== Handball ==
As hosts China has chosen to compete in the girls' tournament.

=== Girls' tournament ===
Roster

- Cao Wenjie
- Han Yu
- Hao Zerong
- Lin Yanqun
- Liu Xuelu
- Shi Ziwei
- Suo Shanshan
- Xu Hanshu
- Yang Lili
- Yang Lu
- Yang Yin
- Yuan Yu
- Zhang Chunjin
- Zhang Tingting

Group stage

Pos	Team	Pld	W	D	L	GF	GA	GD	Pts	Qualification
1	Sweden	2	2	0	0	71	38	+33	4	Semifinals
2	Brazil	2	1	0	1	56	50	+6	2	Semifinals
3	China (H)	2	0	0	2	32	71	−39	0	5th place game

Source: Nanjing 2014
Rules for classification: 1) points; 2) head-to-head points; 3) head-to-head goal difference; 4) head-to-head number of goals scored; 5) goal difference.
(H) Hosts

20 August; 16:00	China	14 - 39	Sweden	Jiangning Sports Centre Gymnasium, Nanjing; Referees: Gasmi, Gasmi (France)
20 August; 16:00	Suo 5	(8 - 20)	three players 7	Jiangning Sports Centre Gymnasium, Nanjing; Referees: Gasmi, Gasmi (France)
20 August; 16:00	3× (yellow card) 7× (suspension)	Report	3× (yellow card)	Jiangning Sports Centre Gymnasium, Nanjing; Referees: Gasmi, Gasmi (France)

21 August; 16:00	Brazil	32 - 18	China	Jiangning Sports Centre Gymnasium, Nanjing; Referees: Brunner, Salah (Switzerland)
21 August; 16:00	Oliveira Fernandes, Maia da Silva 5	(14 - 6)	Liu 6	Jiangning Sports Centre Gymnasium, Nanjing; Referees: Brunner, Salah (Switzerland)
21 August; 16:00	3× (yellow card) 1× (suspension)	Report	3× (yellow card) 3× (suspension)	Jiangning Sports Centre Gymnasium, Nanjing; Referees: Brunner, Salah (Switzerland)

5th place playoffs

First leg

24 August; 9:00	Angola	31 - 18	China	Jiangning Sports Center Gymnasium; Referees: Ota, Shimajiri (Japan)
24 August; 9:00	Paulino 8	(14 - 6)	Shi 5	Jiangning Sports Center Gymnasium; Referees: Ota, Shimajiri (Japan)
24 August; 9:00		Report	2× (yellow card) 4× (suspension)	Jiangning Sports Center Gymnasium; Referees: Ota, Shimajiri (Japan)

Second leg

25 August; 9:00	China	22 - 22	Angola	Jiangning Sports Center Gymnasium; Referees: Wang, Li (China)
25 August; 9:00	Lin, Suo 7	(9 - 11)	Paulino 9	Jiangning Sports Center Gymnasium; Referees: Wang, Li (China)
25 August; 9:00	3× (yellow card) 1× (suspension)	Report	3× (yellow card) 1× (suspension)	Jiangning Sports Center Gymnasium; Referees: Wang, Li (China)

Angola win 53-40 on aggregate

== Judo ==
As hosts China was given a spot to compete in the boys' and girls' events. Later China chose to compete in the boys' -66 kg and girls' -52 kg.

Individual

Athlete	Event	Round of 32	Round of 16	Quarterfinals	Semifinals	Rep 1	Rep 2	Rep 3	Rep 4	Final / BM	Rank
Athlete	Event	Opposition Result	Opposition Result	Opposition Result	Opposition Result	Opposition Result	Opposition Result	Opposition Result	Opposition Result	Opposition Result	Rank
Wu Zhiqiang	Boys' -66 kg	—N/a	Tsend-ochir (MGL); W 000-000	Sancho (CRC); L 000-100	Did not advance	—N/a		Manzi (ITA); W 010-000	Wawrzyczek (POL); W 001-000	Ryu (KOR); W 000-000	3rd place, bronze medalist(s)
Liu Xiaoyu	Girls' -52 kg	Einstein (SWE); L 001-011	Did not advance			Mondelly (HAI); W 100-002	Andriamifehy (MAD); W 000-000	Einstein (SWE); W 001-000	Tseregbaatar (MGL); W 002-000	Štangar (SLO); L 000-100	5

Team

Athletes	Event	Round of 16	Quarterfinals	Semifinals	Final	Rank
Athletes	Event	Opposition Result	Opposition Result	Opposition Result	Opposition Result	Rank
Team Berghmans; Anri Egutidze (POR); Edlene Mondelly (HAI); Michaela Polleres (AUT); Pamela Quizhpi (ECU); Domenik Schonefeldt (GER); Adela Szarzecova (CZE); Wu Zhiqiang (CHN)	Mixed team	Team Kerr (MIX); W 4 – 3	Team Xian (MIX); L 3 – 4	Did not advance		5
Team Chochishvili; Stefania Adelina Dobre (ROU); Fatim Fofana (CIV); Bogdan Iadov (UKR); Louis Krieber-Gagnon (CAN); Liu Xiaoyu (CHN); Yu-Hsuan Lo (TPE); Marton Sarecz (HUN); Estefania Soriano (DOM)	Mixed team	Team Kerr (MIX); L 3 – 4	Did not advance			9

== Modern pentathlon ==
As hosts China was given a spot to compete in the boys' and girls' events, but only chose to compete in the girls' event.

Athlete	Event	Fencing Ranking round (épée one touch)		Swimming (200 m freestyle)			Fencing Final Round (épée one touch)			combined: Shooting/Running (10 m air pistol)/(3000 m)			Total Points	Final Rank
Athlete	Event	Results	Rank	Time	Rank	Points	Results	Rank	Points	Time	Rank	Points	Total Points	Final Rank
Zhong Xiuting	Girls' individual		2	2:24.41	17						1		1054	1st place, gold medalist(s)
Zhong Xiuting (CHN); Wilhelm Hengstenberg (GUA)	Mixed relay													

== Rowing ==
China qualified one boat based on its performance at the Asian Qualification Regatta.

Athlete	Event	Heats		Repechage		Final	
Athlete	Event	Time	Rank	Time	Rank	Time	Rank
Luo Yadan; Pan Jie	Girls' pairs		2 FA	—N/a		3:37.52	2nd place, silver medalist(s)

Qualification Legend: FA=Final A (medal); FB=Final B (non-medal); FC=Final C (non-medal); FD=Final D (non-medal); SA/B=Semifinals A/B; SC/D=Semifinals C/D; R=Repechage

== Rugby sevens ==
As hosts China was given a spot to compete in the girls' tournament.

=== Girls' tournament ===
Roster

- Gao Xue
- Gao Yueying
- Li Tian
- Ling Chen
- Liu Xiaoqian
- Luo Yawen
- Shen Yingying
- Sun Caihong
- Wang Tingting
- Wu Fan
- Yan Meiling
- Yang Feifei

Group stage

Pos	Team	Pld	W	D	L	PF	PA	PD	Pts
1	Australia	5	5	0	0	146	17	+129	15
2	China	5	4	0	1	144	32	+112	13
3	Canada	5	3	0	2	108	71	+37	11
4	United States	5	1	1	3	59	98	−39	8
5	Spain	5	1	1	3	44	129	−85	8
6	Tunisia	5	0	0	5	12	166	−154	5

17 August 2014
09:30

Canada	10 - 24	China

Youth Olympic Sports Park

17 August 2014
16:00

Australia	15 - 12	China

Youth Olympic Sports Park

18 August 2014
10:00

China	34 - 0	Tunisia

Youth Olympic Sports Park

18 August 2014
16:30

United States	7 - 29	China

Youth Olympic Sports Park

19 August 2014
09:30

Spain	0 - 45	China

Youth Olympic Sports Park

Semifinal

19 August 2014
15:30

China	19 - 26	Canada

Youth Olympic Sports Park

Bronze Medal Match

20 August 2014
09:00

United States	0 - 12	China (bronze)

Youth Olympic Sports Park

== Sailing ==
China was given an additional quota spot to compete.

Athlete	Event	Race											Net Points	Final Rank
Athlete	Event	1	2	3	4	5	6	7	8	9	10	M*	Net Points	Final Rank
Wu Linli	Girls' Techno 293	4	(7)	1	1	2	1	1	Cancelled			17.00	10.00	1st place, gold medalist(s)

== Shooting ==
As hosts China was given a spot to compete in the boys' 10m air pistol and girls' 10m air rifle events. Later China qualified an additional spot based on its performance at the 2014 Asian Shooting Championships.

Individual

Athlete	Event	Qualification		Final	
Athlete	Event	Points	Rank	Points	Rank
Yang Haoran	Boys' 10m air rifle	629.4	1 Q	209.3	1st place, gold medalist(s)
Wu Jiayu	Boys' 10m air pistol	570	6 Q	98.1	7
Pei Ruijiao	Girls' 10m air rifle	412.8	6 Q	121.2	6

Team

Athletes	Event	Qualification		Round of 16	Quarterfinals	Semifinals	Final / BM	Rank
Athletes	Event	Points	Rank	Opposition Result	Opposition Result	Opposition Result	Opposition Result	Rank
Yang Haoran (CHN); Monika Woodhouse (AUS)	Mixed team 10m air rifle							
Pei Ruijiao (CHN); Nurullah Aksoy (TUR)	Mixed team 10m air rifle							
Wu Jiayu (CHN); Audrey-Anne Le Sieur (CAN)	Mixed team 10m air pistol		14 Q	Ceper (SLO)/ Deswal (IND); L 5 - 10	Did not advance			17

== Swimming ==
China qualified eight swimmers.

Boys

Athlete	Event	Heat		Semifinal		Final	
Athlete	Event	Time	Rank	Time	Rank	Time	Rank
Yu Hexin	50 m freestyle	22.79	3 Q	22.01 WJR	1 Q	22.00 WJR	1st place, gold medalist(s)
Yu Hexin	100 m freestyle	50.15	1 Q	50.26	5 Q	49.06	2nd place, silver medalist(s)
Yu Hexin	50 m butterfly	24.38	2 Q	24.03	1 Q	23.69	1st place, gold medalist(s)
Li Guangyuan	100 m backstroke	55.33	1 Q	54.52	2 Q	54.56	3rd place, bronze medalist(s)
Li Guangyuan	200 m backstroke	2:01.00	4 Q	—N/a		1:56.94 WJR	1st place, gold medalist(s)
Zhang Zhihao	50 m breaststroke	28.75	6 Q	28.57	4 Q	28.72	6
Zhang Zhihao	100 m breaststroke	1:04.62	26	Did not advance			
Li Zhuhao	50 m butterfly	24.39	3 Q	24.41	6 Q	24.34	6
Li Zhuhao	100 m butterfly	52.97	1 Q	53.26	1 Q	52.94	1st place, gold medalist(s)
Li Guangyuan; Li Zhuhao; Yu Hexin; Zhang Zhihao	4 × 100 m freestyle relay	DSQ		—N/a		Did not advance	
Li Guangyuan; Li Zhuhao; Yu Hexin; Zhang Zhihao	4 × 100 m medley relay	DSQ		—N/a		Did not advance	

Girls

Athlete	Event	Heat		Semifinal		Final	
Athlete	Event	Time	Rank	Time	Rank	Time	Rank
Qiu Yuhan	50 m freestyle	25.57	3 Q	25.61	5 Q	26.68	8
Qiu Yuhan	100 m freestyle	54.65	2 Q	54.78	1 Q	54.66	3rd place, bronze medalist(s)
Qiu Yuhan	200 m freestyle	1:59.73	2 Q	—N/a		1:56.82	2nd place, silver medalist(s)
Shen Duo	100 m freestyle	54.44	1 Q	55.62	8 Q	53.84 WJR	1st place, gold medalist(s)
Shen Duo	200 m freestyle	1:59.72	1 Q	—N/a		1:56.12	1st place, gold medalist(s)
He Yun	50 m breaststroke	1:09.51	4 Q	1:08.47	2 Q	1:07.49	2nd place, silver medalist(s)
He Yun	100 m breaststroke	1:09.51	4 Q	1:08.47	2 Q	1:07.49	2nd place, silver medalist(s)
Zhang Yefei	100 m butterfly	59.13	2 Q	58.78	2 Q	57.95	2nd place, silver medalist(s)
Zhang Yefei	200 m butterfly	2:11.62	2 Q	—N/a		2:08.22	2nd place, silver medalist(s)
He Yun; Qiu Yuhan; Shen Duo; Zhang Yefei	4 × 100 m freestyle relay	3:49.50	3 Q	—N/a		3:41.19	1st place, gold medalist(s)
He Yun; Qiu Yuhan; Shen Duo; Zhang Yefei	4 × 100 m medley relay	4:10.15	2 Q	—N/a		4:03.58 WJR	1st place, gold medalist(s)

Mixed

Athlete	Event	Heat		Final	
Athlete	Event	Time	Rank	Time	Rank
Li Zhuhao; Qiu Yuhan; Shen Duo; Yu Hexin	4 × 100 m freestyle relay	3:29.26	1 Q	3:27.02 WJR	1st place, gold medalist(s)
He Yun; Li Zhuhao; Yu Hexin; Zhang Yefei	4 × 100 m medley relay	3:54.01	1 Q	3:49.33	1st place, gold medalist(s)

== Table tennis ==
As hosts China was given a spot to compete in the boys' and girls' events.

singles

Athlete	Event	Group Stage	Rank	Round of 16	Quarterfinals	Semifinals	Final / BM	Rank
Athlete	Event	Opposition Score	Rank	Opposition Score	Opposition Score	Opposition Score	Opposition Score	Rank
Fan Zhendong	Boys	Group A Afanador (PUR); W 3 - 1	1 Q	Gerassimenko (KAZ); W 4 - 1		Yang (TPE); W 4 - 0	Muramatsu (JPN); W 4 - 2	1st place, gold medalist(s)
Fan Zhendong	Boys	Szudi (HUN); W	1 Q	Gerassimenko (KAZ); W 4 - 1		Yang (TPE); W 4 - 0	Muramatsu (JPN); W 4 - 2	1st place, gold medalist(s)
Fan Zhendong	Boys	Bienatiki (CGO); W 3 – 0	1 Q	Gerassimenko (KAZ); W 4 - 1		Yang (TPE); W 4 - 0	Muramatsu (JPN); W 4 - 2	1st place, gold medalist(s)
Liu Gaoyang	Girls	Group B Piccolin (ITA); W 3 - 0	1 Q	Luo (CAN); W 4 - 0		Kato (JPN); W 4 - 1	Doo (HKG); W 4 - 1	1st place, gold medalist(s)
Liu Gaoyang	Girls	Mukherjee (IND); W 3 – 0	1 Q	Luo (CAN); W 4 - 0		Kato (JPN); W 4 - 1	Doo (HKG); W 4 - 1	1st place, gold medalist(s)
Liu Gaoyang	Girls	Salah (DJI); W 3 – 0	1 Q	Luo (CAN); W 4 - 0		Kato (JPN); W 4 - 1	Doo (HKG); W 4 - 1	1st place, gold medalist(s)

Team

Athletes	Event	Group Stage	Rank	Round of 16	Quarterfinals	Semifinals	Final / BM	Rank
Athletes	Event	Opposition Score	Rank	Opposition Score	Opposition Score	Opposition Score	Opposition Score	Rank
China; Liu Gaoyang (CHN); Fan Zhendong (CHN)	Mixed	Group A Poland; Bajor (POL); Zatowka (POL); W 3 - 0	1 Q	Intercontinental 1 Luo (CAN); Afanador (PUR); W 2 - 0	South Korea; Park (KOR); Kim (KOR); W 2 - 0	Thailand; Khetkhuan (THA); Tanviriyavechakul (THA); W 2 - 0	Japan; Muramatsu (JPN); Kato (JPN); W 2 - 0	1st place, gold medalist(s)
China; Liu Gaoyang (CHN); Fan Zhendong (CHN)	Mixed	Asia 1 Kim (UZB); Al-Naggar (QAT); W 3 - 0	1 Q	Intercontinental 1 Luo (CAN); Afanador (PUR); W 2 - 0	South Korea; Park (KOR); Kim (KOR); W 2 - 0	Thailand; Khetkhuan (THA); Tanviriyavechakul (THA); W 2 - 0	Japan; Muramatsu (JPN); Kato (JPN); W 2 - 0	1st place, gold medalist(s)

Qualification Legend: Q=Main Bracket (medal); qB=Consolation Bracket (non-medal)

== Taekwondo ==
As hosts China was given three spots to compete in boys' events and three spots to compete in girls' events, but only chose four events to compete in. Later China chose to compete in the boys' +73 kg and girls' -49 kg, -63 kg, +63 kg weight categories.

Boys

Athlete	Event	Round of 16	Quarterfinals	Semifinals	Final	Rank
Athlete	Event	Opposition Result	Opposition Result	Opposition Result	Opposition Result	Rank
Liu Jintao	+73 kg	Gegaj (MNE); W 12 - 4	Fehér (ROU); W 11 - 4	Miangue (FRA); L 0 - 1 (SUD)	Did not advance	3rd place, bronze medalist(s)

Girls

Athlete	Event	Round of 16	Quarterfinals	Semifinals	Final	Rank
Athlete	Event	Opposition Result	Opposition Result	Opposition Result	Opposition Result	Rank
Zhan Tian Rui	−49 kg	Bye	Döşüçukur (TUR); W 16 - 7	Craen (BEL); L 11 - 12 (SUD)	Did not advance	3rd place, bronze medalist(s)
Zhang Chen	−63 kg	Bye	Hbowal (JOR); W 5 - 2	Turutina (RUS); L 1 - 11	Did not advance	3rd place, bronze medalist(s)
Li Chen	+63 kg			Abdullaeva (UZB); L 0 - 1	Did not advance	3rd place, bronze medalist(s)

== Tennis ==
China qualified two athletes based on the 9 June 2014 ITF World Junior Rankings.

singles

Athlete	Event	Round of 32	Round of 16	Quarterfinals	Semifinals	Final / BM	Rank
Athlete	Event	Opposition Score	Opposition Score	Opposition Score	Opposition Score	Opposition Score	Rank
Ye Qiuyu	Girls' singles	Giangreco Campiz (PAR); L 1-2; 7^{7}-6^{3}, 3-6, 0-6	Did not advance				17
Xu Shilin	Girls' singles	Bondár (HUN); W 2-0; 6-2, 6-1	Vondroušová (CZE); W 2-1; 6-3, 3-6, 6-2	Schmiedlová (SVK); W 2-0; 6-1, 6-1	Paražinskaitė (LTU); W 2-0; 6-2, 6-3	Shymanovich (BLR); W 2-0; 6-3, 6-1	1st place, gold medalist(s)

doubles

Athletes	Event	Round of 32	Round of 16	Quarterfinals	Semifinals	Final / BM	Rank
Athletes	Event	Opposition Score	Opposition Score	Opposition Score	Opposition Score	Opposition Score	Rank
Ye Qiuyu (CHN); Xu Shilin (CHN)	Girls' doubles	—N/a	Heinová (CZE); Vondroušová (CZE); L 1-2; 6-4, 4-6, [5]-[10]	Did not advance			9
Ye Qiuyu (CHN); Jumpei Yamasaki (JPN)	Mixed doubles	Xu (CHN); Matsumura (JPN); W 2-0; 6-1, 6-1	Kasatkina (RUS); Rublev (RUS); W 2-1; 7-5, 4-6, [10]-[3]	Stefani (BRA); Luz (BRA); W 2-1; 6-1, 3-6, [10]-[6]	Stollár (HUN); Majchrzak (POL); W 2-0; 7^{7}-6^{5}, 6-4	Teichmann (SUI); Zieliński (POL); L 1-2; 6-4, 3-6, [4]-[10]	2nd place, silver medalist(s)
Xu Shilin (CHN); Ryotaro Matsumura (JPN)	Mixed doubles	Ye (CHN); Yamasaki (JPN); L 0-2; 1-6, 1-6	Did not advance				17

== Triathlon ==
China selected to participate in the female event.

Individual

Athlete	Event	Swim (750m)	Trans 1	Bike (20 km)	Trans 2	Run (5 km)	Total Time	Rank
Feng Jingshuang	Girls	00:10:33	00:00:49	00:33:17	00:00:31	00:20:23	01:05:33	23

Relay

Athlete	Event	Total times per athlete (swim 250m, bike 6.6 km, run 1.8 km)	Total group time	Rank
Asia 2 Feng Jingshuang (CHN); Chong Sheng Cher (SIN); Chia Su Yin Denise (SIN); Koyo Yamasaki (JPN)	Mixed relay	0:23:09; 0:22:16; 0:24:25; 0:21:00	01:30:50	13

== Weightlifting ==
As hosts China was given two spots to compete in the boys' events and two spots to compete in the girls' events, but only selected to use one per gender.

Boys

Athlete	Event	Snatch		Clean & jerk		Total	Rank
Athlete	Event	Result	Rank	Result	Rank	Total	Rank
Meng Cheng	−56 kg	128	1	155	1	283	1st place, gold medalist(s)

Girls

Athlete	Event	Snatch		Clean & jerk		Total	Rank
Athlete	Event	Result	Rank	Result	Rank	Total	Rank
Jang Huihua	−48 kg	88	1	105	1	193	1st place, gold medalist(s)

== Wrestling ==
China qualified one athlete based on its performance at the 2014 Asian Cadet Championships.

Key:
- VT - Victory by Fall.
- PP - Decision by Points - the loser with technical points.
- PO - Decision by Points - the loser without technical points.

Girls

Athlete	Event	Group stage				Final / RM	Rank
Athlete	Event	Opposition Score	Opposition Score	Opposition Score	Rank	Opposition Score	Rank
Pei Xingru	Freestyle -60kg	Aquino (GUM); W 4 - 0	Parra (COL); W	Stans (RSA); W 4 - 0	1 Q	Bullen (NOR); L 0 - 4 ^{ST}	2nd place, silver medalist(s)
