= Philippines at the 2014 Summer Youth Olympics =

- Flag of the Philippines
- IOC code: PHI
- NOC: Philippine Olympic Committee
- Website: www.olympic.ph

in Nanjing
- Competitors: 7 in 6 sports
- Flag bearer: Luis Gabriel Moreno
- Medals: Gold 0 Silver 0 Bronze 0 Total 0

Summer Youth Olympics appearances (overview)
- 2010; 2014; 2018; 2026

The Philippines competed at the 2014 Summer Youth Olympics, in Nanjing, China from 16 August to 28 August 2014.

== Medalists ==
Competitors of the Philippines did not medal while competing for their country. However a single athlete won a gold medal competing for a mixed-NOC team.

As part the Mixed-NOC team

Medals awarded to participants of mixed-NOC participation at the 2014 Summer Youth Olympics.

Medal	Name	Sport	Event	Date
Gold	Luis Gabriel Moreno	Archery	Mixed Team	24 August

== Archery ==
The Philippines managed to qualify 2 quota places for archery after their performance at the 2013 Asian Championships, 1 quota place for the boys' events and another for the girls' events.

Individual

Athlete	Event	Ranking round		Round of 32	Round of 16	Quarterfinals	Semifinals	Final / BM	Rank
Athlete	Event	Score	Seed	Opposition Score	Opposition Score	Opposition Score	Opposition Score	Opposition Score	Rank
Luis Gabriel Moreno	Boys' Individual	605	30	D'almeida (BRA) (87); L 0-6	did not advance				17
Bianca Gotuaco	Girls' Individual	642	11	Koike (JPN) (100); L 2-6	did not advance				17

Team

Athletes	Event	Ranking round		Round of 32	Round of 16	Quarterfinals	Semifinals	Final / BM	Rank
Athletes	Event	Score	Seed	Opposition Score	Opposition Score	Opposition Score	Opposition Score	Opposition Score	Rank
Luis Gabriel Moreno (PHI); Li Jiaman (CHN)	Mixed Team	1274	24	Gotuaco (PHI); Murong (BAN); W 5-1	Villegas (VEN); Balaz (SVK); W 5-3	Mugabilzada (AZE); Muto (JPN); W 5-1	Tuokkola (FIN); Peters (CAN); W 5-1	Freywald (GER); Zolkepeli (MAS); W 6-0	1st place, gold medalist(s)
Bianca Gotuaco (PHI); Prennoy Murong (BAN)	Mixed Team	1288	9	Li (CHN); Moreno (PHI); L 1-5	did not advance				17

== Athletics ==
Philippines qualified one athlete.

Qualification Legend: Q=Final A (medal); qB=Final B (non-medal); qC=Final C (non-medal)

Girls
Track & road events

Athlete	Event	Heats		Final	
Athlete	Event	Result	Rank	Result	Rank
Zion Rose Nelson	Women's 400m	56.22	12 qB	55.32	12

== Gymnastics ==
=== Artistic Gymnastics ===
Philippines qualified one athlete based on its performance at the 2014 Asian Artistic Gymnastics Championships.

Girls

Athlete	Event	Apparatus				Total	Rank
Athlete	Event	F	V	UB	BB	Total	Rank
Ava Verdeflor	Qualification	11.950 (20)	13.100 (28)	12.450 (6 Q)	12.700 (13)	50.200	12 Q
Ava Verdeflor	All-around	11.600	12.900	12.450	12.850	49.800	11
Ava Verdeflor	Uneven bars	—N/a				12.333	6

== Shooting ==
Philippines was given a wild card to compete.

Individual

Athlete	Event	Qualification		Final	
Athlete	Event	Points	Rank	Points	Rank
Celdon Jude Arellano	Boys' 10m Air Rifle	605	14	did not advance	

Team

Athletes	Event	Qualification		Round of 16	Quarterfinals	Semifinals	Final / BM	Rank
Athletes	Event	Points	Rank	Opposition Result	Opposition Result	Opposition Result	Opposition Result	Rank
Celdon Jude Arellano (PHI); Milica Babic (SRB)	Mixed Team 10m Air Rifle	811.5 Q	15	Mekhimar (EGY)/ Peni (HUN); L 3 - 10	did not advance			17

== Swimming ==
Philippines qualified one swimmer.

Girls

Athlete	Event	Heat		Semifinal		Final	
Athlete	Event	Time	Rank	Time	Rank	Time	Rank
Roxanne Ashley Yu	100 m backstroke	1:05:16	26	did not advance			
Roxanne Ashley Yu	200 m backstroke	2:18.96	19	—N/a		did not advance	

== Triathlon ==
The Philippines managed to qualify 1 quota place for Triathlon.

Individual

Athlete	Event	Swim (750m)	Trans 1	Bike (20 km)	Trans 2	Run (5 km)	Total Time	Rank
Victorija Evania Deldio	Girls	13:08	0:54	37:11	0:54	22:26	1:14:07	32

Relay

Athlete	Event	Total Times per Athlete (Swim 250m, Bike 6.6 km, Run 1.8 km)	Total Group Time	Rank
Asia 3 Cheuk Yi Hung (HKG); Yin-Cheng Chi (TPE); Victorija Deldio (PHI); Arman Kydyrtayev (KAZ)	Mixed Relay	23:29; 22:07; 25:15; 22:20	1:33:11	15
