= Archery at the 2014 Summer Youth Olympics – Boys' individual =

Boys' individual archery at the II Summer Youth Olympic Games
- Pictogram for archery
- Venue: Fangshan Sports Training Base
- Date: 22–26 August 2014
- Competitors: 32 from 32 nations

Medalists
1st place, gold medalist(s)		Lee Woo-seok	South Korea
2nd place, silver medalist(s)		Marcus D'Almeida	Brazil
3rd place, bronze medalist(s)		Atul Verma	India

The boys' individual archery competition at the 2014 Youth Summer Olympics took place from 22 to 26 August in Nanjing, China.

32 archers from 32 countries entered the competition, which consisted of a 72-arrow 60m ranking round followed by a knockout tournament based on the Olympic scoring system, with the archers seeded according to their ranking round score.

Lee Woo-seok set a new world record during the ranking round, scoring 704 of a maximum of 720.

== Schedule ==
All times are UTC+08:00.

Event date	Event day	Starting time	Event details
August 22	Friday	09:00	Ranking Round
August 23	Saturday	09:00	1/16 Finals
August 23	Saturday	14:00	1/16 Finals
August 26	Tuesday	09:30	1/8 Finals
August 26	Tuesday	15:00	Final Rounds

== Results ==
=== Ranking round ===
Rank	Archer	Nation	Score
1	Lee Woo-seok	South Korea	704
2	Atul Verma	India	688
3	Marcus Vinicius D'Almeida	Brazil	683
4	Jan van Tongeren	Netherlands	682
5	Luis Tapia	Mexico	681
6	Thomas Koenig	France	679
7	Andreas Mayr	Germany	678
8	Han Yun-chien	Chinese Taipei	676
9	Florian Faber	Switzerland	676
10	Hiroki Muto	Japan	674
11	Bradley Denny	Great Britain	670
12	Mete Gazoz	Turkey	667
13	Elia Fregnan	Italy	667
14	Rick Martens	Belgium	666
15	Marek Szafran	Poland	662
16	Boris Balaz	Slovakia	661
17	Muhamad Zarif Syahiir Zolkepeli	Malaysia	654
18	Eric Peters	Canada	653
19	Aliaksei Dubrova	Belarus	651
20	Francisco Rodriguez Sas	Argentina	649
21	Damyan Dachev	Bulgaria	646
22	Prennoy Murong	Bangladesh	646
23	Anton Komar	Ukraine	634
24	Hendra Purnama	Indonesia	633
25	Jose Capote	Venezuela	620
26	Nicholas Turner	Australia	618
27	Xander Reddig	Namibia	616
28	Gasper Strajhar	Slovenia	615
29	Ali El Ghrari	Libya	611
30	Luis Gabriel Moreno	Philippines	605
31	Min Thiha Kyaw	Myanmar	595
32	Seifeldin Elsehely	Egypt	577

=== Elimination rounds ===
==== Finals ====
Semi-finals
1	Lee Woo-seok (KOR)	2	2	2
12	Mete Gazoz (TUR)	0	0	0
3	Marcus Vinicius D'Almeida (BRA)	1	0	1	2	2
2	Atul Verma (IND)	1	2	1	0	0

Gold medal match
1	Lee Woo-seok (KOR)	2	2	1	0	2
3	Marcus Vinicius D'Almeida (BRA)	0	0	1	2	0
Bronze medal match
12	Mete Gazoz (TUR)	0	0	1	2	1
2	Atul Verma (IND)	2	2	1	0	1

==== Top half ====
===== Section 1 =====
1st round
1	Lee Woo-seok (KOR)	2	2	2
32	Seifeldin Elsehely (EGY)	0	0	0
17	Muhamad Zarif Syahiir Zolkepeli (MAS)	2	2	0	2
16	Boris Balaz (SVK)	0	0	2	0
9	Florian Faber (SUI)	2	2	0	2
24	Hendra Purnama (INA)	0	0	2	0
25	Jose Capote (VEN)	0	2	0	0
8	Han Yun-chien (TPE)	2	0	2	2

2nd round
1	Lee Woo-seok (KOR)	2	2	2
17	Muhamad Zarif Syahiir Zolkepeli (MAS)	0	0	0
9	Florian Faber (SUI)	2	0	2	2
8	Han Yun-chien (TPE)	0	2	0	0

Quarter finals
1	Lee Woo-seok (KOR)	0	2	2	2
9	Florian Faber (SUI)	2	0	0	0

===== Section 2 =====
1st round
5	Luis Tapia (MEX)	2	2	2
28	Gasper Strajhar (SLO)	0	0	0
21	Damyan Dachev (BUL)	0	0	2	1	2^{0}
12	Mete Gazoz (TUR)	2	2	0	1	0^{1}
13	Elia Fregnan (ITA)	0	0	0
20	Francisco Rodriguez Sas (ARG)	2	2	2
29	Ali El Ghrari (LBA)	0	0	2	0
4	Jan van Tongeren (NED)	2	2	0	2

2nd round
5	Luis Tapia (MEX)	0	1	2	0	0
12	Mete Gazoz (TUR)	2	1	0	2	2
20	Francisco Rodriguez Sas (ARG)	0	0	2	0
4	Jan van Tongeren (NED)	2	2	0	2

Quarter finals
12	Mete Gazoz (TUR)	1	2	1	2
4	Jan van Tongeren (NED)	1	0	1	0

==== Bottom half ====
===== Section 3 =====
1st round
3	Marcus Vinicius D'Almeida (BRA)	2	2	2
30	Luis Gabriel Moreno (PHI)	0	0	0
19	Aliaksei Dubrova (BLR)	1	0	0	2	0
14	Rick Martens (BEL)	1	2	2	0	2
11	Bradley Denny (GBR)	2	2	2
22	Prennoy Murong (BAN)	0	0	0
27	Xander Reddig (NAM)	0	0	0
6	Thomas Koenig (FRA)	2	2	2

2nd round
3	Marcus Vinicius D'Almeida (BRA)	0	2	1	1	2
14	Rick Martens (BEL)	2	0	1	1	0
11	Bradley Denny (GBR)	2	2	0	2
6	Thomas Koenig (FRA)	0	0	2	0

Quarter finals
3	Marcus Vinicius D'Almeida (BRA)	2	2	2
11	Bradley Denny (GBR)	0	0	0

===== Section 4 =====
1st round
7	Andreas Mayr (GER)	1	2	2	2
26	Nicholas Turner (AUS)	1	0	0	0
23	Anton Komar (UKR)	2	0	1	0	1
10	Hiroki Muto (JPN)	0	2	1	2	1
15	Marek Szafran (POL)	1	2	1	2
18	Eric Peters (CAN)	1	0	1	0
31	Min Thiha Kyaw (MYA)	0	0	0
2	Atul Verma (IND)	2	2	2

2nd round
7	Andreas Mayr (GER)	0	1	0	0
10	Hiroki Muto (JPN)	2	1	2	2
15	Marek Szafran (POL)	1	0	0	1
2	Atul Verma (IND)	1	2	2	1

Quarter finals
10	Hiroki Muto (JPN)	0	1	0	1
2	Atul Verma (IND)	2	1	2	1
