= Bangladesh at the 2014 Summer Youth Olympics =

- IOC code: BAN
- NOC: Bangladesh Olympic Association

in Nanjing
- Competitors: 13 in 5 sports
- Medals: Gold 0 Silver 0 Bronze 0 Total 0

Summer Youth Olympics appearances
- 2010; 2014; 2018

Bangladesh competed at the 2014 Summer Youth Olympics, in Nanjing, China from 16 August to 28 August 2014.

== Archery ==
Bangladesh was given a quota to compete by the tripartite committee.

Individual

Athlete	Event	Ranking round		Round of 32	Round of 16	Quarterfinals	Semifinals	Final / BM	Rank
Athlete	Event	Score	Seed	Opposition Score	Opposition Score	Opposition Score	Opposition Score	Opposition Score	Rank
Prennoy Murong	Boys' Individual	646	22	Bradley Denny (GBR); L 0-6	did not advance				17

Team

Athletes	Event	Ranking round		Round of 32	Round of 16	Quarterfinals	Semifinals	Final / BM	Rank
Athletes	Event	Score	Seed	Opposition Score	Opposition Score	Opposition Score	Opposition Score	Opposition Score	Rank
Prennoy Murong (BAN); Bianca Gotuaco (PHI)	Mixed Team	1288	9	Moreno (PHI) / Li (CHN); L 1-5	did not advance				17

== Field hockey ==
Bangladesh qualified a boys' team based on its performance at the 2013 Under 16 Asian Cup.

=== Boys' tournament ===
Roster

- Mohammad Raju Ahmmed
- Rezaul Babu
- Mohamed Deen Emon
- Mohammad Ashraful Islam
- Mohammad Fazla Rabby
- Sajibure Rahman
- Khaled Rakin
- Mohammad Sarkar
- Mohamed Uddin

Group Stage

Pos	Team	Pld	W	D	L	GF	GA	GD	Pts	Qualification
1	Spain	4	4	0	0	28	10	+18	12	Quarterfinals
2	Australia	4	2	0	2	21	17	+4	6	Quarterfinals
3	Canada	4	2	0	2	14	13	+1	6	Quarterfinals
4	South Africa	4	2	0	2	11	19	−8	6	Quarterfinals
5	Bangladesh	4	0	0	4	7	22	−15	0	

Source: FIH
Rules for classification: 1) points; 2) goal difference; 3) goals scored; 4) head-to-head result.

17 August 2014
17:30

Spain	9-1	Bangladesh
	Report

18 August 2014
16:30

Australia	5-2	Bangladesh
	Report

19 August 2014
19:00

Canada	4-1	Bangladesh
	Report

20 August 2014
19:30

Bangladesh	3-4	South Africa
	Report

Placement 9-10

25 August 2014
16:00

Bangladesh	4-5	Germany
	Report

== Shooting ==
Bangladesh was given a quota to compete by the tripartite committee.

Individual

Athlete	Event	Qualification		Final	
Athlete	Event	Points	Rank	Points	Rank
Sharmin Akter	Girls' 10m Air Rifle	397.0	19	did not advance	

Team

Athletes	Event	Qualification		Round of 16	Quarterfinals	Semifinals	Final / BM	Rank
Athletes	Event	Points	Rank	Opposition Result	Opposition Result	Opposition Result	Opposition Result	Rank
Sharmin Akter (BAN); Hrachik Babayan (ARM)	Mixed Team 10m Air Rifle	814.8	10 Q	Parshukova (RUS) / Petanjek (CRO); W 10-7	Mekhimar (EGY) / Peni (HUN); L 4-10	did not advance		6

== Swimming ==
Bangladesh qualified one swimmer.

Boys

Athlete	Event	Heat		Semifinal		Final	
Athlete	Event	Time	Rank	Time	Rank	Time	Rank
Asif Reza	50 m freestyle	24.98	34	did not advance			

== Weightlifting ==
Bangladesh was given a quota to compete in a girls' event by the tripartite committee.

Girls

Athlete	Event	Snatch		Clean & jerk		Total	Rank
Athlete	Event	Result	Rank	Result	Rank	Total	Rank
Jahura Reshma	−48 kg	55	10	72	10	127	10
