= Benin at the 2014 Summer Youth Olympics =

- IOC code: BEN
- NOC: Benin National Olympic and Sports Committee

in Nanjing
- Competitors: 5 in 3 sports
- Medals: Gold 0 Silver 0 Bronze 0 Total 0

Summer Youth Olympics appearances
- 2010; 2014; 2018

Benin competed at the 2014 Summer Youth Olympics, in Nanjing, China from 16 August to 28 August 2014.

== Archery ==
Benin qualified a female archer from its performance at the African Continental Qualification Tournament.

Individual

Athlete	Event	Ranking round		Round of 32	Round of 16	Quarterfinals	Semifinals	Final / BM	Rank
Athlete	Event	Score	Seed	Opposition Score	Opposition Score	Opposition Score	Opposition Score	Opposition Score	Rank
Merveille Zinsou	Girls' Individual	498	32	Lee (KOR); L 0 – 6	did not advance				17

Team

Athletes	Event	Ranking round		Round of 32	Round of 16	Quarterfinals	Semifinals	Final / BM	Rank
Athletes	Event	Score	Seed	Opposition Score	Opposition Score	Opposition Score	Opposition Score	Opposition Score	Rank
Merveille Zinsou (BEN); Lee Woo-seok (KOR)	Mixed Team	1202	32	Mugabilzada (AZE); Muto (JPN); L 2 – 6	did not advance				17

== Athletics ==
Benin qualified two athletes.

Qualification Legend: Q=Final A (medal); qB=Final B (non-medal); qC=Final C (non-medal); qD=Final D (non-medal); qE=Final E (non-medal)

Boys
Track & road events

Athlete	Event	Heats		Final	
Athlete	Event	Result	Rank	Result	Rank
Moussa Abdoulaye	100 m	11.52	22 qC	11.43	20

Girls
Track & road events

Athlete	Event	Heats		Final	
Athlete	Event	Result	Rank	Result	Rank
Foumilayo Agbety	400 m	58.74	16 qC	58.22	17

== Swimming ==
Benin qualified two swimmers.

Boys

Athlete	Event	Heat		Semifinal		Final	
Athlete	Event	Time	Rank	Time	Rank	Time	Rank
Rayane Alognisso	50 m freestyle	31.31	48	did not advance			

Girls

Athlete	Event	Heat		Semifinal		Final	
Athlete	Event	Time	Rank	Time	Rank	Time	Rank
Charmel Sogbadji	50 m freestyle	45.76	48	did not advance			
