= Libya at the 2014 Summer Youth Olympics =

- IOC code: LBA
- NOC: Libyan Olympic Committee

in Nanjing
- Competitors: 3 in 3 sports
- Medals: Gold 0 Silver 0 Bronze 0 Total 0

Summer Youth Olympics appearances
- 2010; 2014; 2018

Libya competed at the 2014 Summer Youth Olympics, in Nanjing, China from 16 August to 28 August 2014.

== Archery ==
Libya qualified a male archer from its performance at the African Continental Qualification Tournament.

Individual

Athlete	Event	Ranking round		Round of 32	Round of 16	Quarterfinals	Semifinals	Final / BM	Rank
Athlete	Event	Score	Seed	Opposition Score	Opposition Score	Opposition Score	Opposition Score	Opposition Score	Rank
Ali El Ghrari	Boys' Individual	611	29	J Tongeren (NED); L 2 – 6	did not advance				17

Team

Athletes	Event	Ranking round		Round of 32	Round of 16	Quarterfinals	Semifinals	Final / BM	Rank
Athletes	Event	Score	Seed	Opposition Score	Opposition Score	Opposition Score	Opposition Score	Opposition Score	Rank
Alicia Marin (ESP); Ali El Ghrari (LBA)	Mixed Team	1275	23	M Koike (JPN); D Bradley (GBR); L 4 – 5	did not advance				17

== Athletics ==
Libya qualified one athlete.

Qualification Legend: Q=Final A (medal); qB=Final B (non-medal); qC=Final C (non-medal); qD=Final D (non-medal); qE=Final E (non-medal)

Boys
Field Events

Athlete	Event	Qualification		Final	
Athlete	Event	Distance	Rank	Distance	Rank
Zakaria Al Ahmer	Discus throw	54.67	10 qB	53.79	12

== Weightlifting ==
Libya qualified 1 quota in the boys' events based on the team ranking after the 2014 Weightlifting Junior & Youth African Championships.

Boys

Athlete	Event	Snatch		Clean & jerk		Total	Rank
Athlete	Event	Result	Rank	Result	Rank	Total	Rank
Ehsan Shalabi	−62 kg	95	9	105	9	200	9
