= Chinese Taipei at the 2014 Summer Youth Olympics =

- IOC code: TPE
- NOC: Chinese Taipei Olympic Committee

in Nanjing
- Competitors: 47 in 15 sports
- Flag bearer: Yang Chun-han
- Medals Ranked 16th: Gold 3 Silver 3 Bronze 2 Total 8

Summer Youth Olympics appearances (overview)
- 2010; 2014; 2018

Chinese Taipei competed at the 2014 Summer Youth Olympics, in Nanjing, China from 16 August to 28 August 2014.

== Medalists ==
Medal	Name	Sport	Event	Date
Gold	Huang Huai-hsuan	Taekwondo	Girls' 49kg	18 August
Gold	Huang Yu-jen	Taekwondo	Boys' 55kg	18 August
Gold	Chiang Nien-Hsin	Weightlifting	Girls' 58kg	19 August
Silver	Wang Chen-yu	Taekwondo	Boys' 48kg	17 August
Silver	Cheng Ssu-Chia	Golf	Girls' individual	21 August
Silver	Chen Nien-chin	Boxing	Girls' 75kg	26 August
Bronze	Chen Zih-ting	Taekwondo	Girls' 44kg	17 August
Bronze	Yang Chun-han	Athletics	Boys' 200 metres	24 August

== Archery ==
Chinese Taipei qualified two archers based on its performance at the 2013 World Archery Youth Championships.

Individual

Athlete	Event	Ranking round		Round of 32	Round of 16	Quarterfinals	Semifinals	Final / BM	Rank
Athlete	Event	Score	Seed	Opposition Score	Opposition Score	Opposition Score	Opposition Score	Opposition Score	Rank
Han Yun-Chien	Boys' Individual	676	8	Capote (VEN); W 6–2	Faber (SUI); L 2–6	Did not advance			9
Fang Tzu-Yun	Girls' Individual	651	7	Tatafu (TGA); W 7–1	Zyzanska (POL); L 5–6	Did not advance			9

Team

Athletes	Event	Ranking round		Round of 32	Round of 16	Quarterfinals	Semifinals	Final / BM	Rank
Athletes	Event	Score	Seed	Opposition Score	Opposition Score	Opposition Score	Opposition Score	Opposition Score	Rank
Han Yun-Chien (TPE); Sviatlana Kazanskaya (BLR)	Mixed Team	1290	6	Turner (AUS); Fang (TPE); W 6-2	Gazoz (TUR); Raysin (ISR); W 5-4	Martens (BEL); Romero (GUA); L 2-6	Did not advance		7
Fang Tzu-Yun (TPE); Nicholas Turner (AUS)	Mixed Team	1269	27	Kazanskaya (BLR); Han (TPE); L 2-6	Did not advance				17

== Athletics ==
Chinese Taipei qualified 14 athletes.

Qualification Legend: Q=Final A (medal); qB=Final B (non-medal); qC=Final C (non-medal); qD=Final D (non-medal); qE=Final E (non-medal)

Boys
Track & road events

Athlete	Event	Heats		Final	
Athlete	Event	Result	Rank	Result	Rank
Cheng Po-Yu	100 m	10.84	10 qB	10.83	9
Yang Chun-Han	200 m	21.03 =PB	3 Q	21.31	3rd place, bronze medalist(s)
Chou Tzu-Yao	400 m	50.01	17 qC	49.89	16
Cheng Chi-Hung	110 m hurdles	14.09	17 qC	14.40	17
Huang Chien-Kang	400 m hurdles	53.33	12 qB	53.62	13
Zeng Ting-Wei	2000 m steeplechase	5:58.21 PB	12 qB	6:10.36	12
Chang Wei-Lin	10 km walk	—N/a		44:27.87 PB	7

Field Events

Athlete	Event	Qualification		Final	
Athlete	Event	Distance	Rank	Distance	Rank
Huang Chun-Sheng	Long jump	6.98	8 Q	7.16	7
Chen Yen-Hung	High jump	1.99	14 qB	2.02	12

Girls
Track & road events

Athlete	Event	Final	
Athlete	Event	Result	Rank
Liu Yu-Chi	5 km walk	25:14.62 PB	12

Field events

Athlete	Event	Qualification		Final	
Athlete	Event	Distance	Rank	Distance	Rank
Wen Wan-Ju	Long jump	5.42	13 qB	5.41	12
Lee Ching-Ching	High jump	1.78 PB	4 Q	1.75	8
Shen Yi-Ju	Pole vault	3.40	12 qB	3.40	12
Chen Chueh-Yi	Discus throw	38.92 PB	11 qB	37.23	13

== Badminton ==
Chinese Taipei qualified two athletes based on the 2 May 2014 BWF Junior World Rankings.

Singles

Athlete	Event	Group stage				Quarterfinal	Semifinal	Final / BM	Rank
Athlete	Event	Opposition Score	Opposition Score	Opposition Score	Rank	Opposition Score	Opposition Score	Opposition Score	Rank
Lu Chia-hung	Boys' Singles	Lin (CHN); L 1-2	Garrido (MEX); W 2-0	Coelho (BRA); W 2-0	2	did not advance			
Lee Chia-hsin	Girls' Singles	Qin (CHN); W 2-0	Pavlinić (CRO); W 2-0	Lesnaya (UKR); W 2-0	1QF	Kim (KOR); W 2-0	Yamaguchi (JPN); L 1-2	Ongbumrungpan (THA); L 0-2	4

Doubles

Athlete	Event	Group stage				Quarterfinal	Semifinal	Final / BM	Rank
Athlete	Event	Opposition Score	Opposition Score	Opposition Score	Rank	Opposition Score	Opposition Score	Opposition Score	Rank
Lee Ying Ying (MAS); Lu Chia-hung (TPE)	Mixed Doubles	Pham (VIE); Demirbag (TUR); W 2-1	Petrovic (SRB); Liang (SIN); W 2-1	Garrido (MEX); Kuuba (EST); W 2-0	1QF	Cheam (MAS); Ng (HKG); L 0-2	did not advance		5
Lee Chia-hsin (TPE); Kanta Tsuneyama (JPN)	Mixed Doubles	Lee (HKG); Konieczna (POL); W 2-1	Jakowczuk (POL); Azurmendi (ESP); W 2-0	Dhami (NEP); Ongbumrungpan (THA); W 2-0	1QF	Shi (CHN); Lai (AUS); W 2-0	Angodavidanalage (SRI); He (CHN); W 2-1	Cheam (MAS); Ng (HKG); L 0-2	2nd place, silver medalist(s)

== Basketball ==
Chinese Taipei qualified a girls' team based on the 1 June 2014 FIBA 3x3 National Federation Rankings.

Skills Competition

Athlete	Event	Qualification			Final		
Athlete	Event	Points	Time	Rank	Points	Time	Rank
Jou-Chen Huang	Girls' Shoot-out Contest	3	28.2	43	Did not advance		
I-Chian Lee	Girls' Shoot-out Contest	3	24.4	35	Did not advance		
Pin Lo	Girls' Shoot-out Contest	4	25.8	26	Did not advance		
Yi-Ching Su	Girls' Shoot-out Contest	2	22.3	49	Did not advance		

=== Girls' tournament ===
Roster

- Jou-Chen Huang
- I-Chian Lee
- Pin Lo
- Yi-Ching Su

Group stage

Pos	Team	Pld	W	D	L	PF	PA	PD	Pts	Qualification
1	United States	9	9	0	0	190	54	+136	27	Round of 16
2	Belgium	9	7	0	2	136	75	+61	21	Round of 16
3	Thailand	9	6	0	3	96	102	−6	18	Round of 16
4	Czech Republic	9	6	0	3	140	106	+34	18	Round of 16
5	Chinese Taipei	9	5	0	4	124	114	+10	15	Round of 16
6	Romania	9	5	0	4	118	102	+16	15	Round of 16
7	Egypt	9	4	0	5	125	127	−2	12	Round of 16
8	Guam	9	2	0	7	77	151	−74	6	Round of 16
9	Andorra	9	1	0	8	76	161	−85	3	Eliminated
10	Indonesia	9	0	0	9	66	156	−90	0	Eliminated

18 August 2014
19:20

Chinese Taipei	14–16	Egypt

Wutaishan Sports Center, Nanjing

19 August 2014
17:00

Thailand	10–14	Chinese Taipei

Wutaishan Sports Center, Nanjing

19 August 2014
20:40

Chinese Taipei	11–13	Belgium

Wutaishan Sports Center, Nanjing

20 August 2014
20:00

Andorra	13–16	Chinese Taipei

Wutaishan Sports Center, Nanjing

22 August 2014
17:20

Chinese Taipei	21–9	Guam

Wutaishan Sports Center, Nanjing

22 August 2014
21:40

Chinese Taipei	vs.	Czech Republic

Wutaishan Sports Center, Nanjing

23 August 2014
19:00

United States	21–5	Chinese Taipei

Wutaishan Sports Center, Nanjing

24 August 2014
17:00

Chinese Taipei	16–13	Romania

Wutaishan Sports Center, Nanjing

24 August 2014
20:20

Indonesia	5–15	Chinese Taipei

Wutaishan Sports Center, Nanjing

Knockout Stage

Round of 16	Quarterfinals	Semifinals	Final	Rank
Opposition Score	Opposition Score	Opposition Score	Opposition Score	Rank
Estonia; L 10-14	did not advance			

== Beach volleyball ==
Chinese Taipei qualified a girls' team by their performance at the AVC Qualification Tournament.

Athletes	Event	Preliminary round	Standing	Round of 24	Round of 16	Quarterfinals	Semifinals	Final / BM	Rank
Athletes	Event	Opposition Score	Standing	Opposition Score	Opposition Score	Opposition Score	Opposition Score	Opposition Score	Rank
Tzu-Yi Pan; Yu-Rong Song	Girls'	Bitrus/Audu (NGR); W w/o	3 Q	Kawfong/Tangkaeo (THA); L 1 - 2	did not advance				25
Tzu-Yi Pan; Yu-Rong Song	Girls'	Eti/Sakalia (TUV); W 2 – 0	3 Q	Kawfong/Tangkaeo (THA); L 1 - 2	did not advance				25
Tzu-Yi Pan; Yu-Rong Song	Girls'	Fortunati/Rotti (URU)	3 Q	Kawfong/Tangkaeo (THA); L 1 - 2	did not advance				25
Tzu-Yi Pan; Yu-Rong Song	Girls'	Cetin/Yurtsever (TUR)	3 Q	Kawfong/Tangkaeo (THA); L 1 - 2	did not advance				25
Tzu-Yi Pan; Yu-Rong Song	Girls'	Mondesir/Noel (LCA); W 2 – 0	3 Q	Kawfong/Tangkaeo (THA); L 1 - 2	did not advance				25

== Boxing ==
Chinese Taipei qualified two boxers based on its performance at the 2014 AIBA Youth World Championships

Girls

Athlete	Event	Preliminaries	Semifinals	Final / RM	Rank
Athlete	Event	Opposition Result	Opposition Result	Opposition Result	Rank
Hsiao-Wen Huang	-51 kg	Chang (CHN); L 0–3	Did not advance	Bout for 5th place Balkibekova (KAZ); L 0–2	6
Nien-Chin Chen	-75 kg	Bye	Desmond (IRL); W 3-0	Wojcik (POL); L 1-2	2nd place, silver medalist(s)

== Golf ==
Chinese Taipei qualified one team of two athletes based on the 8 June 2014 IGF Combined World Amateur Golf Rankings.

Individual

Athlete	Event	Round 1		Round 2			Round 3			Total	
Athlete	Event	Score	Rank	Score	Total	Rank	Score	Total	Rank	Score	Rank
Kevin Yu	Boys	69 (-3)	5	73 (+1)	142 (-2)		72 (PAR)	214 (-2)		214	12
Ssu-Chia Cheng	Girls	69 (-3)	1	70 (-2)	139 (-5)		66 (-6)	205 (-11)		205	2nd place, silver medalist(s)

Team

Athletes	Event	Round 1 (Foursome)		Round 2 (Fourball)			Round 3 (Individual Stroke)				Total	
Athletes	Event	Score	Rank	Score	Total	Rank	Boy	Girl	Total	Rank	Score	Rank
Kevin Yu; Ssu-Chia Cheng	Mixed	66 (-6)	9	67 (-5)	133 (-11)		70 (-2)	72 (PAR)	275 (-13)		275	5

== Judo ==
Chinese Taipei qualified two athletes based on its performance at the 2013 Cadet World Judo Championships.

Individual

Athlete	Event	Round of 32	Round of 16	Quarterfinals	Semifinals	Rep 1	Rep 2	Rep 3	Rep 4	Final / BM	Rank
Athlete	Event	Opposition Result	Opposition Result	Opposition Result	Opposition Result	Opposition Result	Opposition Result	Opposition Result	Opposition Result	Opposition Result	Rank
Yu Hsuan Lo	Boys' -81 kg	Ndiaye (SEN); W 100-000	de Wit (NED); L 000-100	Did not advance		Penning (LUX); L 010-100	Did not advance				17
Yu Jyun Wang	Girls' -78 kg	—N/a	de Bruine (AUS); L 000-000	Did not advance		—N/a	Bye	Rodriguez (ESP); L 000-100	Did not advance		11

Team

Athletes	Event	Round of 16	Quarterfinals	Semifinals	Final	Rank
Athletes	Event	Opposition Result	Opposition Result	Opposition Result	Opposition Result	Rank
Team Chochishvili; Stefania Adelina Dobre (ROU); Fatim Fofana (CIV); Bogdan Iadov (UKR); Louis Krieber-Gagnon (CAN); Liu Xiaoyu (CHN); Yu-Hsuan Lo (TPE); Marton Sarecz (HUN); Estefania Soriano (DOM)	Mixed Team	Team Kerr (MIX); L 3 – 4	Did not advance			9
Team Geesink; Layana Colman (BRA); Nemanja Majdov (SRB); Dzmitry Minkou (BLR); Ryu Seunghwan (KOR); Ivana Sunjevic (MNE); Anastasya Turcheva (RUS); Yu-Jyun Wang (TPE)	Mixed Team	Team Chochishvili (MIX); W 4 – 3	Team van de Walle (MIX); W 4 – 3	Team Geesink (MIX); W 3^{202} – 3^{111}	Team Rouge (MIX); L 2 - 4	2nd place, silver medalist(s)

== Sailing ==
Chinese Taipei was given a reallocation boat based on being a top ranked nation not yet qualified.

Athlete	Event	Race											Net Points	Final Rank
Athlete	Event	1	2	3	4	5	6	7	8	9	10	M*	Net Points	Final Rank
Ting-Yu Wang	Boys' Techno 293	(15)	15	12	13	15	10	18	Cancelled			98.00	83.00	15

== Shooting ==
Chinese Taipei qualified two shooters based on its performance at the 2014 Asian Shooting Championships.

Individual

Athlete	Event	Qualification		Final	
Athlete	Event	Points	Rank	Points	Rank
Shao-Chuan Lu	Boys' 10m Air Rifle	623.5	4 Q	101.8	7
Ting-Yu Chung	Girls' 10m Air Pistol	359	16	Did not advance	

Team

Athletes	Event	Qualification		Round of 16	Quarterfinals	Semifinals	Final / BM	Rank
Athletes	Event	Points	Rank	Opposition Result	Opposition Result	Opposition Result	Opposition Result	Rank
Shao-Chuan Lu (TPE); Viktoriya Sukhorukova (UKR)	Mixed Team 10m Air Rifle		Q	W	Prashant (IND); Angirmaa Nergui (MGL); W 10 - 9	Santos Valdés (MEX); Russo (ARG); L 8 - 10	Milovanovic (SRB); Riccardi (SMR); W 10 – 6	3rd place, bronze medalist(s)
Ting-Yu Chung (TPE); Zaven Igityan (ARM)	Mixed Team 10m Air Pistol		Q	Kim (KOR); Schulze (CAN); W	Konarieva (UKR); Aric (MDA); W 10 - 0	Nencheva (BUL); Svechnikov (UZB); L 8 - 10	Rasmane (LAT); Madrid (GUA); L 8 - 10	4

== Swimming ==
Chinese Taipei qualified four swimmers.

Boys

Athlete	Event	Heat		Semifinal		Final	
Athlete	Event	Time	Rank	Time	Rank	Time	Rank
Bing-Rong Cai	50 m breaststroke	30.16	31	Did not advance			
Bing-Rong Cai	100 m breaststroke	1:04.23	22	Did not advance			
Bing-Rong Cai	200 m breaststroke	2:15.78	6 Q	—N/a		2:16.89	7
Wei-Liang Chou	200 m butterfly	2:04.12	13	—N/a		Did not advance	

Girls

Athlete	Event	Heat		Semifinal		Final	
Athlete	Event	Time	Rank	Time	Rank	Time	Rank
Yu-Wen Teng	800 m freestyle	—N/a				9:09.78	20
Wen-Chi Huang	50 m breaststroke	33.31	22	Did not advance			

== Table Tennis ==
Chinese Taipei qualified two athletes based on its performance at the 2014 World Qualification Event.

Singles

Athlete	Event	Group stage	Rank	Round of 16	Quarterfinals	Semifinals	Final / BM	Rank
Athlete	Event	Opposition Score	Rank	Opposition Score	Opposition Score	Opposition Score	Opposition Score	Rank
Heng-Wei Yang	Boys	Group D Jing (SIN); W 3 - 1	1 Q	Reitspies (CZE); W 4 - 1	Ort (GER); W 4 - 0	Fan (CHN); L 0 - 4	Calderano (BRA); L 2 - 4	4
Heng-Wei Yang	Boys	Alassani (TOG); W 3 - 0	1 Q	Reitspies (CZE); W 4 - 1	Ort (GER); W 4 - 0	Fan (CHN); L 0 - 4	Calderano (BRA); L 2 - 4	4
Heng-Wei Yang	Boys	Tanviriyavechakul (THA); W 3 - 1	1 Q	Reitspies (CZE); W 4 - 1	Ort (GER); W 4 - 0	Fan (CHN); L 0 - 4	Calderano (BRA); L 2 - 4	4
Ssu-Hua Chiu	Girls	Group E Saad (EGY); W 3 - 2	1 Q	Park (KOR); W 4 - 3	Liu (CHN); L 2 - 4	Did not advance		5
Ssu-Hua Chiu	Girls	Trosman (ISR); L 2 - 3	1 Q	Park (KOR); W 4 - 3	Liu (CHN); L 2 - 4	Did not advance		5
Ssu-Hua Chiu	Girls	Bui (AUS); W 3 - 0	1 Q	Park (KOR); W 4 - 3	Liu (CHN); L 2 - 4	Did not advance		5

Team

Athletes	Event	Group stage	Rank	Round of 16	Quarterfinals	Semifinals	Final / BM	Rank
Athletes	Event	Opposition Score	Rank	Opposition Score	Opposition Score	Opposition Score	Opposition Score	Rank
Chinese Taipei; Ssu-Hua Chiu (TPE); Heng-Wei Yang (TPE)	Mixed	United States; Zhang (USA); Avvari (USA); W 2 - 1	1 Q	Belgium; Lung (BEL); Allegro (BEL); W 2 - 0	Thailand; Khetkhuan (THA); Tanviriyavechakul (THA); L 0 - 2	Did not advance		5
Chinese Taipei; Ssu-Hua Chiu (TPE); Heng-Wei Yang (TPE)	Mixed	Europe 2 Trosman (ISR); Ranefur (SWE); W 3 - 0	1 Q	Belgium; Lung (BEL); Allegro (BEL); W 2 - 0	Thailand; Khetkhuan (THA); Tanviriyavechakul (THA); L 0 - 2	Did not advance		5
Chinese Taipei; Ssu-Hua Chiu (TPE); Heng-Wei Yang (TPE)	Mixed	Africa 2 Seera (UGA); Bienatiki (CGO); W w/o	1 Q	Belgium; Lung (BEL); Allegro (BEL); W 2 - 0	Thailand; Khetkhuan (THA); Tanviriyavechakul (THA); L 0 - 2	Did not advance		5

Qualification Legend: Q=Main Bracket (medal); qB=Consolation Bracket (non-medal)

== Taekwondo ==
Chinese Taipei qualified five athletes based on its performance at the Taekwondo Qualification Tournament.

Boys

Athlete	Event	Round of 16	Quarterfinals	Semifinals	Final	Rank
Athlete	Event	Opposition Result	Opposition Result	Opposition Result	Opposition Result	Rank
Chen-Yu Wang	−48 kg	Bye	Serikbay (KAZ); W 19 (PTG) - 5	Chiovetta (GER); W 14 - 9	Eshaghi (IRI); L 9 - 17	2nd place, silver medalist(s)
Huang Yu-jen	−55 kg	Bye	Zaouia (NED); W 14 (PTG) - 1	Tortosa (ESP); W 7 - 1	Joo (KOR); W 7 - 2	1st place, gold medalist(s)
Kuang-Wu Hou	−63 kg	Nava (MEX); L 7 - 9	Did not advance			9

Girls

Athlete	Event	Round of 16	Quarterfinals	Semifinals	Final	Rank
Athlete	Event	Opposition Result	Opposition Result	Opposition Result	Opposition Result	Rank
Zih-Ting Chen	−44 kg	Bye	Federici (GER); W 6 - 3	Wongpattanakit (THA); L 1 - 8	Did not advance	3rd place, bronze medalist(s)
Huai-Hsuan Huang	−49 kg	Bye	Polat (AZE); W 6 - 5	Lúa (MEX); W 6 - 1	Craen (BEL); W 12 - 5	1st place, gold medalist(s)

== Triathlon ==
Chinese Taipei qualified one athlete based on its performance at the 2014 Asian Youth Olympic Games Qualifier.

Individual

Athlete	Event	Swim (750m)	Trans 1	Bike (20 km)	Trans 2	Run (5 km)	Total Time	Rank
Yin-Cheng Chi	Boys	09:36	00:44	32:18	00:27	19:48	1:02:53	30

Relay

Athlete	Event	Total Times per Athlete (Swim 250m, Bike 6.6 km, Run 1.8 km)	Total Group Time	Rank
Asia 3 Cheuk Yi Hung (HKG); Yin-Cheng Chi (TPE); Victorija Deldio (PHI); Arman Kydyrtayev (KAZ)	Mixed Relay	23:29; 22:07; 25:15; 22:20	1:33:11	15

== Weightlifting ==
Chinese Taipei qualified 1 quota in the boys' and girls' events based on the team ranking after the 2014 Weightlifting Youth & Junior Asian Championships.

Boys

Athlete	Event	Snatch		Clean & jerk		Total	Rank
Athlete	Event	Result	Rank	Result	Rank	Total	Rank
Yung-En Lai	−56 kg	98	7	127	5	225	6

Girls

Athlete	Event	Snatch		Clean & jerk		Total	Rank
Athlete	Event	Result	Rank	Result	Rank	Total	Rank
Nien-Hsin Chiang	−58 kg	88	1	115	1	203	1st place, gold medalist(s)
