= Tonga at the 2026 Summer Youth Olympics =

- Flag of Tonga
- IOC code: TGA
- NOC: Tonga Sports Association and National Olympic Committee

in Dakar, Senegal October 31, 2026 – November 13, 2026
- Competitors: 4 in 2 sports
- Flag bearers: Luseane Limoni & Alexander Villiami
- Medals: Gold 0 Silver 0 Bronze 0 Total 0

Summer Youth Olympics appearances
- 2010; 2014; 2018; 2026

Tonga is scheduled to compete at the 2026 Summer Youth Olympics in Dakar, Senegal from October 31 to November 13, 2026. This will mark Tonga's fourth appearance at the Youth Olympics, after making its debut in 2010.

Swimmers Luseane Limoni and Alexander Villiami served as the flag bearers for the opening ceremony.

== Competitors ==
The following is the list of number of competitors participating at the Games per sport/discipline.

Sport	Men	Women	Total
Athletics	1	1	2
Swimming	1	1	2
Total	2	2	4

== Athletics ==
Tonga entered two athletes, one male and one female.

Track events

Athlete	Event	Heat		Final	
Athlete	Event	Result	Rank	Result	Rank
Angelina Tupou	Women's 100 metres hurdles				

Field events

Athlete	Event	Final	
Athlete	Event	Distance	Rank
Halafihi Fishiihoi	Men's shot put		

== Swimming ==
Tonga entered two swimmers, one male and one female.

Athlete	Event	Heat		Final	
Athlete	Event	Time	Rank	Time	Rank
Alexander Villiami	Men's 50 m freestyle				
Alexander Villiami	Men's 100 m freestyle				
Alexander Villiami	Men's 50 m backstroke				
Alexander Villiami	Men's 100 m backstroke				
Luseane Limoni	Women's 50 m freestyle				
Luseane Limoni	Women's 100 m freestyle				
Luseane Limoni	Women's 50 m backstroke				
