= Tonga at the 2014 Summer Youth Olympics =

- IOC code: TGA
- NOC: Tonga Sports Association and National Olympic Committee

in Nanjing
- Competitors: 3 in 3 sports
- Medals: Gold 0 Silver 0 Bronze 0 Total 0

Summer Youth Olympics appearances
- 2010; 2014; 2018; 2026

Tonga competed at the 2014 Summer Youth Olympics, in Nanjing, China from 16 August to 28 August 2014.

== Archery ==
Tonga was given a quota to compete by the tripartite committee.

Individual

| Athlete | Event | Ranking round | | Round of 32 | Round of 16 | Quarterfinals | Semifinals | Final / BM | Rank |
| Athlete | Event | Score | Seed | Opposition Score | Opposition Score | Opposition Score | Opposition Score | Opposition Score | Rank |
|---|---|---|---|---|---|---|---|---|---|
| Lucy Tatafu | Girls' Individual | 613 | 26 | Fang (TPE); L 1 – 7 | did not advance | | | | 17 |

Team

| Athletes | Event | Ranking round | | Round of 32 | Round of 16 | Quarterfinals | Semifinals | Final / BM | Rank |
| Athletes | Event | Score | Seed | Opposition Score | Opposition Score | Opposition Score | Opposition Score | Opposition Score | Rank |
|---|---|---|---|---|---|---|---|---|---|
| Lucy Tatafu (TGA); Andreas Mayr (GER) | Mixed Team | 1291 | 2 | Elshimy (EGY); A Verma (IND); W 6 – 0 | C Freywald (GER); M Zolkepeli (MAS); L 4 – 5 | did not advance | | | 9 |

== Swimming ==
Tonga qualified one swimmer.

Girls

| Athlete | Event | Heat | | Semifinal | | Final | |
| Athlete | Event | Time | Rank | Time | Rank | Time | Rank |
|---|---|---|---|---|---|---|---|
| Calina Panuve | 50 m freestyle | 35.15 | 47 | did not advance | | | |
| Calina Panuve | 50 m backstroke | 42.42 | 38 | did not advance | | | |

== Weightlifting ==
Tonga was given a quota to compete in a boys' event by the tripartite committee.

Boys

| Athlete | Event | Snatch | | Clean & jerk | | Total | Rank |
| Athlete | Event | Result | Rank | Result | Rank | Total | Rank |
|---|---|---|---|---|---|---|---|
| Chirk Manzo | −77 kg | 89 | 10 | 112 | 10 | 201 | 10 |
