= Tonga at the 2018 Summer Youth Olympics =

- IOC code: TGA
- NOC: Tonga Sports Association and National Olympic Committee

in Buenos Aires
- Competitors: 12 in 3 sports
- Medals: Gold 0 Silver 0 Bronze 0 Total 0

Summer Youth Olympics appearances
- 2010; 2014; 2018; 2026

Tonga participated at the 2018 Summer Youth Olympics in Buenos Aires, Argentina from 6 October to 18 October 2018.

== Competitors ==
The following is the list of number of competitors that participated at the Games per sport.

| Sport | Boys | Girls | Total |
|---|---|---|---|
| Athletics | 1 | 0 | 1 |
| Futsal | 0 | 10 | 10 |
| Swimming | 1 | 0 | 1 |
| Total | 2 | 10 | 12 |

== Archery ==
Tonga was given a spot to compete in the girl's event by the tripartite committee, but Tonga did not compete in archery.

== Athletics ==
Tonga was given a spot to compete by the tripartite committee.

- Boys' events - 1 quota

== Futsal ==
Tonga qualified in the girls' tournament by finishing runner's up at the 2017 OFC Youth Futsal Tournament and after New Zealand decided to compete in rugby sevens.

- Girls' tournament - 1 team of 10 athletes

== Swimming ==
Tonga was given a quota to compete in the boy's event by the tripartite committee.

- Boys' events - Finau 'Ohuafi

== Taekwondo ==
Tonga was given a quota to compete in the girls' +63 kg event by the tripartite committee, but Tonga did not compete in taekwondo.
