= Tonga at the 2010 Summer Youth Olympics =

- IOC code: TGA
- NOC: Tonga Sports Association and National Olympic Committee

in Singapore
- Competitors: 2 in 2 sports
- Flag bearer: Michael Taufa
- Medals: Gold 0 Silver 0 Bronze 0 Total 0

Summer Youth Olympics appearances
- 2010; 2014; 2018

Tonga participated in the 2010 Summer Youth Olympics in Singapore.

The Tongan squad consist of 2 athletes competing in 2 sports: taekwondo and weightlifting.

== Taekwondo ==
Athlete	Event	Preliminary	Quarterfinal	Semifinal	Final	Rank
Hulita Matekuolava	Girls' +63kg	Olga Ivanova (RUS); L RSC R1 0:07	did not advance			9

== Weightlifting ==
Boys

Athlete	Event	Snatch	Clean & Jerk	Total	Rank
Michael Taufa	62kg	97	120	217	11
