= Atul Verma =

Indian archer (born 1997)

Medal record

Men's Recurve archery

Representing India

Military World Games
Bronze medal – third place	2015 Mungyeong	Team

Summer Youth Olympics
Bronze medal – third place	2014 Nanjing	Individual

World Youth Championships
Silver medal – second place	2017 Rosario	Junior individual

Atul Verma (born 20 June 1997) is an Indian archer . He won the bronze medal in Men's Recurve Archery at 2014 Summer Youth Olympics in Nanjing, China beating Mete Gazoz of Turkey 6-4 .

== Tokyo Olympics ==
He secured his place compete in Tokyo Olympics in the November qualifiers. Atul was included in the Target Olympic Podium Scheme (TOPS) list for the 2020 Olympics.
