= Lee Eun-gyeong (archer) =

South Korean archer (born 1997)

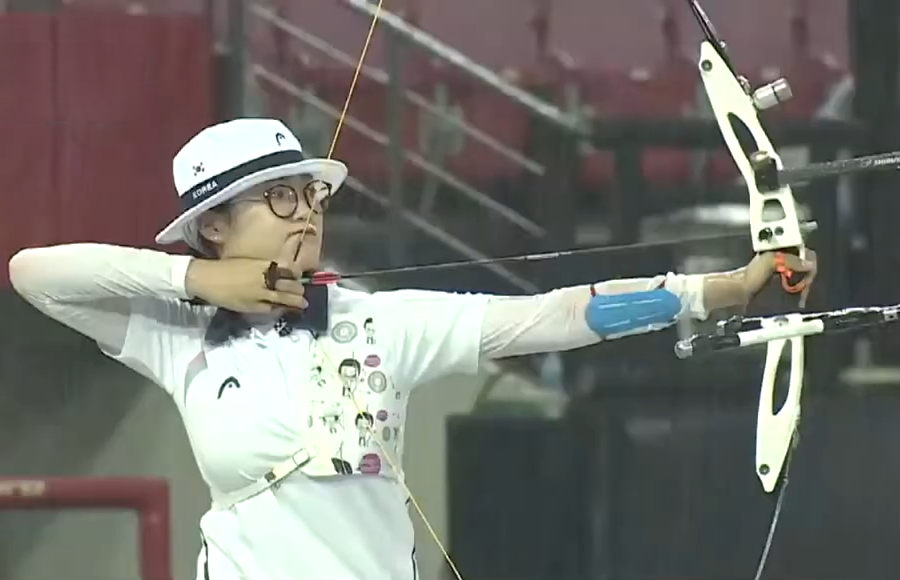
- Lee in 2018

Personal information
- Born: 8 May 1997 (age 29)
Medal record
Women's recurve archery
Representing South Korea
Asian Games
Gold medal – first place	2018 Jakarta	Team
Asian Championships
Gold medal – first place	2017 Dhaka	Individual
Gold medal – first place	2017 Dhaka	Team
Gold medal – first place	2019 Bangkok	Team
World Cup Final
Gold medal – first place	2018 Samsun	Individual
Summer Universiade
Gold medal – first place	2017 Taipei	Team

Lee Eun-gyeong (Korean: 이은경, born 8 May 1997) is a South Korean archer. She competed at the 2018 Asian Games in Jakarta, where she won a gold medal with the South Korean archery team. She also won the 2018 Archery World Cup final.

She was the bronze medalist in 2014 Summer Youth Olympics archery women's event.
