= Li Jiaman =

Chinese archer (born 1997)

Personal information
- Born: 18 August 1997 (age 28) Beijing, China

Sport
- Country: China
- Sport: Archery
- Event: Recurve
Medal record
Women's recurve archery
Representing China
Olympic Games
Silver medal – second place	2024 Paris	Team
Asian Games
Silver medal – second place	2022 Hangzhou	Team
Bronze medal – third place	2022 Hangzhou	Individual
Asian Championships
Silver medal – second place	2023 Bangkok	Team
Silver medal – second place	2023 Bangkok	Mixed team
Bronze medal – third place	2017 Dhaka	Team
Bronze medal – third place	2023 Bangkok	Individual
Youth Olympic Games
Gold medal – first place	2014 Nanjing	Individual
World Cup
Gold medal – first place	2024 Tlaxcala	Individual
Gold medal – first place	2024 Shanghai	Team
Gold medal – first place	2024 Yecheon	Team
Silver medal – second place	2023 Medellín	Team
Bronze medal – third place	2023 Paris	Mixed team
Bronze medal – third place	2024 Shanghai	Individual
Representing (International Olympic Committee) Mixed-NOCs
Youth Olympic Games
Gold medal – first place	2014 Nanjing	Mixed team

Li Jiaman
- Simplified Chinese: 李佳蔓
Transcriptions
Standard Mandarin
- Hanyu Pinyin: Lǐ Jiāmàn

Li Jiaman (born 18 August 1997) is a Chinese archer, who participated in the 2014 Summer Youth Olympics. She was the sole representative of the host-country China in the archery competition. Plays for the Beijing Archery Team.

She won a gold medal with Filipino Luis Gabriel Moreno at the Youth Olympics at the mixed international team archery event. After the mixed international team event, Li won the girls' individual event gold medal round on a shoot-out against Melanie Gaubil of France.

Li's coach is 1996 Summer Olympics silver medalist He Ying.

== Early life ==
When Li Jiaman was very young, her parents wanted her to practice sports to keep fit. She happened to have a good friend who was learning archery, so Li Jiaman started practicing archery.

== Career ==
On 3 September 2013, in the women's team finals of the archery event at the 2013 12th National Games, Li Jiaman/Zhu Yuwei/Zhao Ling won the silver medal.

On 24 August 2014, in the archery mixed team finals of the 2014 Nanjing Youth Olympic Games, Li Jiaman and Moreno won the gold medal. On 25 August, in the women's individual archery final of the Nanjing Youth Olympic Games, Li Jiaman defeated Melanie Gobi 6-5 and won the gold medal.

On 20 October 2015, in the archery women's individual Olympic ranking finals of the First National Youth Games, Li Jiaman won third place with 647 rings.

On 14 April 2016, in the women's recurve team finals of the 2016 National Archery Championship, Li Jiaman/Zhao Muyan/Zhu Yuwei won the runner-up. On 26 October, in the women's individual final of the 2016 National Outdoor Archery Championship, Li Jiaman defeated Liu Huimin and won the championship.

On 31 August 2017, Li Jiaman won the bronze medal in the women's individual archery final of the 13th National Games. On 3 September, in the archery women's team finals of the 13th National Games, Li Jiaman/Zhao Ling/Zhao Muyan won the silver medal.

In June 2023, at the Archery World Cup in Medellin, Colombia, the Chinese women's team composed of Li Jiaman/Yang Xiaolei/Wu Jiaxin/Xu Zhiyun won the runner-up in the women's recurve team.

== Awards and honours ==
In September 2013, Li Jiaman won the silver medal in the archery women's team at the 12th National Games.

In October 2016, Li Jiaman won the National Outdoor Archery Championship.

In 2017, Li Jiaman won the individual bronze medal in archery and the women's team silver medal at the 13th National Games.
