= Sylwia Zyzańska =

Polish archer (born 1997)

Personal information
- Nationality: Polish
- Born: 27 July 1997 (age 28)

Sport
- Sport: Archery
Medal record
Women's recurve archery
Representing Poland
Military World Games
Silver medal – second place	2019 Wuhan	Individual

Sylwia Zyzańska (born 27 July 1997) is a Polish archer. She won the silver medal in the women's individual event at the 2019 Military World Games held in Wuhan, China. She competed in the women's individual event at the 2020 Summer Olympics.
