= Ali El Ghrari =

Libyan recurve archer (born 1997)

Personal information
- Born: 31 January 1997 (age 29)

Sport
- Country: Libya
- Sport: Archery
- Event: Recurve
- Updated on 26 July 2016

Ali El Ghrari (born 31 January 1997) is a male Libyan recurve archer. He competed in the archery competition at the 2016 Summer Olympics in Rio de Janeiro, the first Libyan to do so.
