= Mélanie Gaubil =

French archer (born 1997)

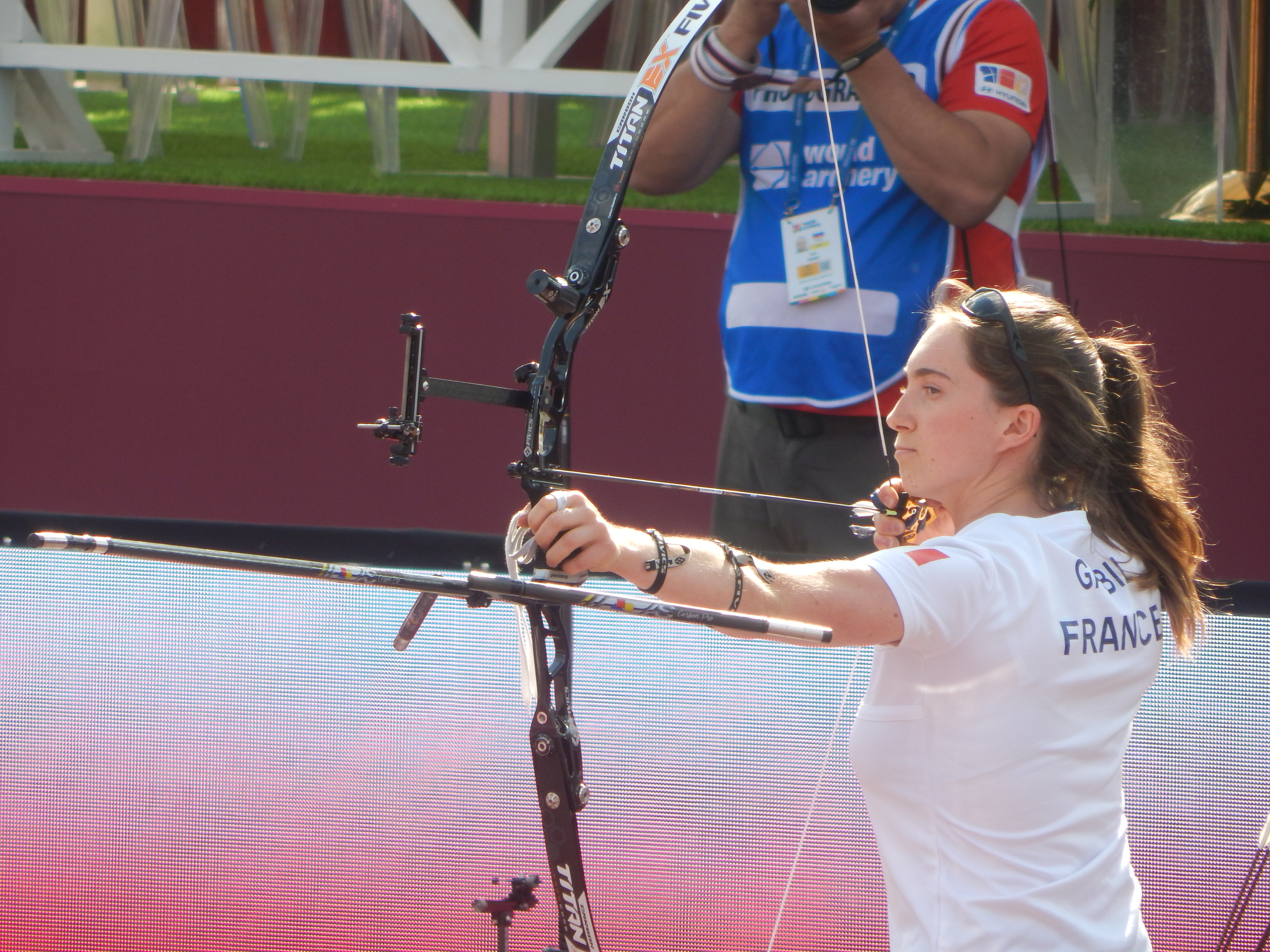
- Gaubil at the 2019 Archery World Cup in Moscow.

Personal information
- Born: 4 October 1997 (age 29)

Sport
- Country: France
- Sport: Archery
- Event: Recurve
Medal record
Women's archery
Representing France
Youth Olympics
Silver medal – second place	2014 Nanjing	Individual

Mélanie Gaubil (born 4 October 1997) is a French archer who competed at the 2014 Summer Youth Olympics.

== Career ==
Gaubil contested the 2013 French National Archery Championships in both the junior and senior categories, finishing as the runner-up in the former and sixth overall in the latter after being eliminated in the quarter-finals. She later achieved a bronze medal in the women's team event at the Mediterranean Games in Mersin, and by the end the year had set five new national records.

Gaubil made her Olympic debut at the 2014 Summer Youth Olympics in Nanjing. She placed fifth in the 72-arrow ranking round, setting a personal record of 663 points from 720 despite suffering from an inflamed shoulder, before progressing through the elimination rounds to the final. She was defeated by China's Li Jiaman in a tie-breaking one-arrow shoot-off, receiving the silver medal as the runner-up.

Gaubil reached her first senior international final at the opening stage of the 2019 Archery World Cup, where she lost in straight sets to South Korea's Kang Chae-young.

She is coached by Nicholas Rifaut and is a member of Les archers leguevinois, an archery club.
