= Bianca Gotuaco =

Filipino archer (born 1997)

Personal information
- Born: 22 July 1997 (age 29)

Sport
- Country: Philippines
- Sport: Archery
- Event: Recurve
- Updated on 10 September 2015

Bianca Gotuaco (born 22 July 1997) is a Filipino recurve archer. She is currently studying at Columbia University and is a member of the university's archery team.

== Career ==
Gotuaco started archery in 2006 and made her international debut in 2009 at the Youth World Archery Championships held in Odgen, competing in the individual cadet recurve event. She later competed in the 2013 Youth World Archery Championships in Wuxi.

In 2014, Gotuaco represented the Philippines in the 2014 Nanjing Youth Olympic Games in archery.

She competed in the individual recurve event and the team recurve event at the 2015 World Archery Championships in Copenhagen, Denmark.

Gotuaco was awarded All-American honors in the recurve in 2016 and 2017, making her part of the Collegiate Archery Program All-American Team. She received her first collegiate National Title by taking the gold medal at the 2017 National Outdoor Collegiate Archery Championships after defeating her teammate Christine Kim. The Columbia Lions also took the gold in the recurve team event over Texas A&M.
