= Verona Villegas =

Venezuelan archer (born 1998)

Personal information
- Born: 11 February 1998 (age 28)

Sport
- Country: Venezuela
- Sport: Archery
- Event: recurve
- Updated on 10 September 2015

Verona Villegas (born 11 February 1998) is a Venezuelan recurve archer.

== Career ==
Villegas represented her country at the 2015 Pan American Games. She competed in the individual recurve event and the team recurve event at the 2015 World Archery Championships in Copenhagen, Denmark.
