= Hiroki Muto =

Japanese archer (born 1997)

Personal information
- Native name: 武藤 弘樹
- Nationality: Japanese
- Born: 26 June 1997 (age 29)

Sport
- Country: Japan
- Sport: Archery
Medal record
Men's recurve archery
Representing Japan
Olympic Games
Bronze medal – third place	2020 Tokyo	Team
Asian Championships
Silver medal – second place	2017 Dhaka	Mixed team

Hiroki Muto (Japanese: 武藤 弘樹, Mutō Hiroki) is a Japanese archer. He competed in Archery at the 2020 Summer Olympics. In the bronze medal match of the Men's team event, Muto hit a do-or-die bullseye in the tie-breaker set to win bronze for Japan.
