= Luis Gabriel Moreno =

Filipino archer (born 1998)

- Moreno in 2014

Personal information
- Born: May 28, 1998 (age 28)

Sport
- Sport: Archery
Medal record
Representing (International Olympic Committee) Mixed-NOCs
Youth Olympic Games
Gold medal – first place	2014 Nanjing	Mixed team
Representing Philippines
Southeast Asian Games
Bronze medal – third place	2017 Kuala Lumpur	Team

Luis Gabriel Magdayao Moreno (Tagalog pronunciation: [mɐɡˈdɐjaʊ mɔˈɾɛ.nɔ]; born May 28, 1998) is a Filipino archer later actor who competed for the Philippines at the 2014 Summer Youth Olympics. Competing with Li Jiaman of China, Moreno is the first representative of the Philippines to clinch a gold medal for a Mixed-NOC team in the Summer Youth Olympics.

== Career ==
=== Early years ===
Moreno picked up archery when he was six years old. He later went on to compete in the 2013 Palarong Pambansa in Dumaguete. He clinched 5 gold, 1 silver, and 1 bronze in his debut at the national student-athlete competition.

=== Summer Youth Olympics ===
Moreno represented the Philippines at the 2014 Summer Youth Olympics in China also serving as the flag bearer for his country in the parade of nations. Together with Li Jiaman of China, he won a gold medal at the mixed international team event.

=== Southeast Asian Games ===
Along with Florante Matan and Mark Javier, Moreno won over Vietnam to clinch the bronze medal in the men's recurve team event of the 2017 Southeast Asian Games in Kuala Lumpur, Malaysia.

== Personal life ==
Moreno was a student at La Salle Green Hills. He is the grandson of television host German Moreno and is the nephew of actresses Shaina Magdayao and Vina Morales.

== Filmography ==
Year	Program	Role
2021	Regal Studio Presents: The Signs	Patrick
2022	Family Feud	Himself

== Honors ==
Moreno was given a citation at the 2015 PSA Annual Awards by the Philippine Sportswriters Association for his feat in 2014. He was also given a sports achievement award by the De La Salle Alumni Association in 2021.
