= Hungary at the Youth Olympics =

- IOC code: HUN
- NOC: Hungarian Olympic Committee
- Website: www.mob.hu (in Hungarian)
- Medals Ranked 9th: Gold 25 Silver 20 Bronze 23 Total 68

Summer appearances
- 2010; 2014; 2018

Winter appearances
- 2012; 2016; 2020; 2024

Hungary has participated at the Youth Olympic Games in every edition since the inaugural 2010 Games and has earned medals from every edition.

Hungarian youth athletes have won a total of 62 medals at the Youth Summer Games and 6 medals at the Youth Winter Games, with swimming being the top medal-producing sport.

== Medal tables ==
=== Medals by Summer Games ===
Games	Athletes	Gold	Silver	Bronze	Total	Rank
2010 Singapore	51	6	4	6	16	8
(China) 2014 Nanjing	57	6	6	11	23	8
(Argentina) 2018 Buenos Aires	79	12	7	5	24	4
(Senegal) 2026 Dakar	Future event					
Total		24	17	21	62	4

=== Medals by Winter Games ===
Games	Athletes	Gold	Silver	Bronze	Total	Rank
(Austria) 2012 Innsbruck	9	0	2	0	2	21
(Norway) 2016 Lillehammer	15	0	1	1	2	22
(Switzerland) 2020 Lausanne	23	0	0	0	0	-
(South Korea) 2024 Gangwon	33	1	0	1	2	22
Total		1	3	2	6	25

=== Medals by summer sport ===
Sport	Gold	Silver	Bronze	Total
Swimming	15	3	4	22
Canoeing	4	3	0	7
Fencing	3	0	2	5
Judo	2	1	2	5
Athletics	0	4	5	9
Gymnastics	0	3	1	4
Modern pentathlon	0	2	1	3
Wrestling	0	1	0	1
Boxing	0	0	2	2
Beach handball	0	0	1	1
Cycling	0	0	1	1
Sailing	0	0	1	1
Shooting	0	0	1	1
Totals (13 entries)	24	17	21	62

=== Medals by winter sport ===
Sport	Gold	Silver	Bronze	Total
Ice hockey	1	2	0	3
Short track speed skating	0	1	2	3
Totals (2 entries)	1	3	2	6

== List of medalists ==
=== Summer Games ===
Medal	Name	Games	Sport	Event
Gold	Boglárka Kapás	2010 Singapore	Swimming	Girls' 200 m butterfly
Gold	Péter Bernek	2010 Singapore	Swimming	Boys' 200 m backstroke
Gold	Bence Biczó	2010 Singapore	Swimming	Boys' 200 m butterfly
Gold	Boglárka Kapás	2010 Singapore	Swimming	Girls' 400 m freestyle
Gold	Ramóna Farkasdi	2010 Singapore	Canoeing	Girls' K1 sprint
Gold	Sándor Tótka	2010 Singapore	Canoeing	Boys' K1 sprint
Silver	Boglárka Kapás	2010 Singapore	Swimming	Girls' 200 m freestyle
Silver	Zsófia Földházi	2010 Singapore	Modern pentathlon	Girls' individual
Silver	Barbara Batizi	2010 Singapore	Judo	Girls' 44 kg
Silver	Krisztina Váradi	2010 Singapore	Athletics	Girls' discus throw
Bronze	Dóra Lupkovics	2010 Singapore	Fencing	Girls' foil
Bronze	Balázs Zámbó	2010 Singapore	Swimming	Boys' 200 m backstroke
Bronze	Krisztián Tóth	2010 Singapore	Judo	Boys' 81 kg
Bronze	Balázs Töreky	2010 Singapore	Athletics	Boys' hammer throw
Bronze	Zoltán Harcsa	2010 Singapore	Boxing	Boys' middleweight
Gold	Patrik Esztergályos	(China) 2014 Nanjing	Fencing	Boys' épée
Gold	Szabina Gercsák	(China) 2014 Nanjing	Judo	Girls' 63 kg
Gold	Benjámin Grátz	(China) 2014 Nanjing	Swimming	Boys' 200 m medley
Gold	Liliána Szilágyi	(China) 2014 Nanjing	Swimming	Girls' 200 m butterfly
Gold	Tamás Kenderesi	(China) 2014 Nanjing	Swimming	Boys' 200 m butterfly
Gold	Liliána Szilágyi	(China) 2014 Nanjing	Swimming	Girls' 100 m butterfly
Silver	Benjámin Grátz	(China) 2014 Nanjing	Swimming	Boys' 200 m butterfly
Silver	Botond Kardos	(China) 2014 Nanjing	Gymnastics	Boys' parallel bars
Silver	Bence Halász	(China) 2014 Nanjing	Athletics	Boys' hammer throw
Silver	Milán Mozgi	(China) 2014 Nanjing	Canoeing	Boys' K1 sprint
Silver	Luca Homonnai	(China) 2014 Nanjing	Canoeing	Girls' K1 sprint
Silver	Gergely Regős	(China) 2014 Nanjing	Modern pentathlon	Boys' individual
Bronze	Norbert Szabó	(China) 2014 Nanjing	Swimming	Boys' 200 m medley
Bronze	Anna Sztankovics	(China) 2014 Nanjing	Swimming	Girls' 50 m breaststroke
Bronze	Petra Záhonyi	(China) 2014 Nanjing	Fencing	Girls' sabre
Bronze	István Péni	(China) 2014 Nanjing	Shooting	Boys' 10 m air rifle
Bronze	Anna Sztankovics	(China) 2014 Nanjing	Swimming	Girls' 200 m breaststroke
Bronze	Zsófia Bácskay	(China) 2014 Nanjing	Athletics	Girls' hammer throw
Bronze	Jonatán Vadnai	(China) 2014 Nanjing	Sailing	Boys' Byte CII
Bronze	Márk Schmölcz	(China) 2014 Nanjing	Athletics	Boys' javelin throw
Bronze	Lili Anna Tóth	(China) 2014 Nanjing	Athletics	Girls' 2000 m steeplechase
Bronze	Eszter Bajnok	(China) 2014 Nanjing	Athletics	Girls' triple jump
Bronze	Richárd Könnyű	(China) 2014 Nanjing	Boxing	Boys' lightweight
Gold	Kristóf Milák	(Argentina) 2018 Buenos Aires	Swimming	Boys' 400 m freestyle
Gold	Krisztián Rabb	(Argentina) 2018 Buenos Aires	Fencing	Boys' sabre
Gold	Kristóf Milák	(Argentina) 2018 Buenos Aires	Swimming	Boys' 200 m freestyle
Gold	Blanka Berecz	(Argentina) 2018 Buenos Aires	Swimming	Girls' 200 m butterfly
Gold	Szofi Özbas	(Argentina) 2018 Buenos Aires	Judo	Girls' 63 kg
Gold	Liza Pusztai	(Argentina) 2018 Buenos Aires	Fencing	Girls' sabre
Gold	Ajna Késely	(Argentina) 2018 Buenos Aires	Swimming	Girls' 800 m freestyle
Gold	Ajna Késely	(Argentina) 2018 Buenos Aires	Swimming	Girls' 200 m freestyle
Gold	Eszter Rendessy	(Argentina) 2018 Buenos Aires	Canoeing	Girls' K1 sprint
Gold	Kristóf Milák	(Argentina) 2018 Buenos Aires	Swimming	Boys' 200 m butterfly
Gold	Ajna Késely	(Argentina) 2018 Buenos Aires	Swimming	Girls' 400 m freestyle
Gold	Ádám Kiss	(Argentina) 2018 Buenos Aires	Canoeing	Boys' K1 sprint
Silver	Kristóf Milák	(Argentina) 2018 Buenos Aires	Swimming	Boys' 100 m butterfly
Silver	Laura Gönczöl	(Argentina) 2018 Buenos Aires	Canoeing	Girls' C1 sprint
Silver	Krisztián Balázs	(Argentina) 2018 Buenos Aires	Gymnastics	Boys' floor
Silver	Anna Szél	(Argentina) 2018 Buenos Aires	Wrestling	Girls' freestyle 57 kg
Silver	Csenge Bácskay	(Argentina) 2018 Buenos Aires	Gymnastics	Girls' vault
Silver	Klaudia Endrész	(Argentina) 2018 Buenos Aires	Athletics	Girls' long jump
Silver	Dániel Huller	(Argentina) 2018 Buenos Aires	Athletics	Boys' 400 m hurdles
Bronze	Zsombor Vég	(Argentina) 2018 Buenos Aires	Judo	Boys' 100 kg
Bronze	Rebeka Benzsay; Csenge Braun; Dorottya Gajdos; Gréta Hadfi; Réka Király; Gabriella Landi; Sára Léránt; Dalma Mátéfi; Klaudia Pintér	(Argentina) 2018 Buenos Aires	Beach handball	Girls' tournament
Bronze	Michelle Gulyás	(Argentina) 2018 Buenos Aires	Modern pentathlon	Girls' individual
Bronze	Krisztián Balázs	(Argentina) 2018 Buenos Aires	Gymnastics	Boys' horizontal bar
Bronze	Virág Buzsáki; Kata Blanka Vas	(Argentina) 2018 Buenos Aires	Cycling	Girls' combined team

=== Summer Games medalists as part of Mixed-NOCs Team ===
Medal	Name	Games	Sport	Event
Gold	Eszter Dudás	2010 Singapore	Triathlon	Mixed relay
Bronze	Tímea Babos	2010 Singapore	Tennis	Girls' doubles
Gold	István Péni	(China) 2014 Nanjing	Shooting	Mixed teams' 10 m air rifle
Silver	Bence Lehmann	(China) 2014 Nanjing	Triathlon	Mixed relay
Silver	Anna Zs.Tóth	(China) 2014 Nanjing	Modern pentathlon	Mixed relay
Silver	Patrik Esztergályos	(China) 2014 Nanjing	Fencing	Mixed team
Bronze	Fanni Stollár	(China) 2014 Nanjing	Tennis	Mixed doubles
Gold	Krisztián Balázs	(Argentina) 2018 Buenos Aires	Gymnastics	Mixed multi-discipline team
Gold	Liza Pusztai; Krisztián Rabb	(Argentina) 2018 Buenos Aires	Fencing	Mixed team
Gold	Zalán Pekler	(Argentina) 2018 Buenos Aires	Shooting	Mixed 10 m air rifle
Silver	Vince Jármy	(Argentina) 2018 Buenos Aires	Equestrian	Team Jumping

=== Winter Games ===
Medal	Name	Games	Sport	Event
Silver	Attila Kovács	(Austria) 2012 Innsbruck	Ice hockey	Boys' individual skills
Silver	Fanni Gasparics	(Austria) 2012 Innsbruck	Ice hockey	Girls' individual skills
Silver	Petra Jászapáti	(Norway) 2016 Lillehammer	Short track	Girls' 500 m
Bronze	Shaoang Liu	(Norway) 2016 Lillehammer	Short track	Boys' 1000 m
Bronze	Dominik Major	(South Korea) 2024 Gangwon	Short track	Men's 500 m

=== Winter Games medalists as part of Mixed-NOCs Team ===
Medal	Name	Games	Sport	Event
Silver	Petra Jászapáti	(Norway) 2016 Lillehammer	Short track	Mixed NOC Team Relay
Bronze	Fruzsina Medgyesi	(Norway) 2016 Lillehammer	Figure skating	Team trophy

== Flag bearers ==
#	Games	Season	Flag bearer	Sport
6	2020 Lausanne	Winter	Hanna Bíró	Speed skating
5	2018 Buenos Aires	Summer	Zsombor Vég	Judo
4	2016 Lillehammer	Winter	Virág Vörös	Ski jumping
3	2014 Nanjing	Summer	Bence Halász	Athletics
2	2012 Innsbruck	Winter	Dávid Panyik	Biathlon
1	2010 Singapore	Summer	Gergely Demeter	Modern pentathlon

== See also ==
- Hungary at the Olympics
- Hungary at the Paralympics
