= Rugby sevens at the 2014 Summer Youth Olympics =

Rugby sevens at the II Summer Youth Olympic Games
- Venue: Youth Olympic Sports Park
- Dates: 17–20 August

Rugby sevens at the 2014 Summer Youth Olympics was held from 17 to 20 August at the Youth Olympic Sports Park in Nanjing, China. The 2014 Games marked the debut of Rugby sevens at the Youth Olympics as it was voted an Olympic sport for the 2016 Summer Olympics.

== Qualification ==
A total of 6 teams will participate in each gender. Each National Olympic Committee (NOC) can enter a maximum of 2 teams of 12 athletes, 1 per each gender. As hosts, China was given a spot to compete in the girls’ tournament. The six male and five other female teams were decided at the 2013 Rugby World Cup Sevens held in Moscow, Russia from 28–30 June 2013. The top ranking nation from each of the six regional unions qualified a team (in the girls’ tournament NACRA and CONSUR were combined).

However, due to the rule where nations may only qualify a single team sport (field hockey, football, handball and rugby sevens) in each gender some teams had to make a choice in which sport to participate in. Any declined teams were reallocated to the next best ranked team at the 2013 Rugby World Cup Sevens in the same regional union. Should none remain the spot would go to the next best ranked team not yet qualified.

To be eligible to participate at the Youth Olympics athletes must have been born between 1 January 1996 and 31 December 1997.

=== Participating teams ===
Regional Unions	Boys	Girls
Africa (CAR)	Kenya	Tunisia
Asia (ARFU)	Japan	China
Europe (FIRA-AER)	France	Spain
North America and Caribbean (NACRA)	United States	Canada; United States
South America (CONSUR)	Argentina	-
Oceania (FORU)	Fiji	Australia

== Schedule ==
The schedule was released by the Nanjing Youth Olympic Games Organizing Committee.

All times are CST (UTC+8)

Event date	Event day	Starting time	Event details
August 17	Sunday	09:00; 16:00	Boys' Group Stage; Girls' Group Stage
August 18	Monday	09:00; 16:00	Boys' Group Stage; Girls' Group Stage
August 19	Tuesday	09:00	Boys' Group Stage; Girls' Group Stage
August 19	Tuesday	15:30	Boys' 5-6 Match; Girls' 5-6 Match; Boys' Semifinals; Girls' Semifinals
August 20	Wednesday	09:00	Boys' Medal Matches; Girls' Medal Matches

== Medal summary ==
=== Medal table ===
* Host nation (China)

Rank	Nation	Gold	Silver	Bronze	Total
1	Australia	1	0	0	1
1	France	1	0	0	1
3	Argentina	0	1	0	1
3	Canada	0	1	0	1
5	China*	0	0	1	1
5	Fiji	0	0	1	1
Totals (6 entries)		2	2	2	6

=== Events ===
Event	Gold	Silver	Bronze
Boys'	France; Alex Arrate; Faraj Fartass; Alex Gracbling; Alexandre Lagarde; Martin Laveau; Alexandre Nicque; Alexandre Pilati; Arthur Retière; Alexandre Roumat; Atila Septar; Sacha Valleau; Matthieu Voisin	Argentina; Jose Barros Sosa; Lautaro Bazan Velez; Vicente Boronat; Enrique Camerlinckx; Juan Cruz Camerlinckx; Juan Ignacio Conil Vila; Manuel de Sousa Carrusca; Bautista Delguy; Indalecio Ledlesma; Hugo Miotti; Mariano Romanini; Isaac Sprenger	Fiji; Josaia Cokaibusa; Waisea Daroko; Timoci Meya; Ratu Nawabalavu; Sailasa Powell; Alipate Qaraniqio; Filipe Qoro; Navitalai Ralawa; Joseva Rauga; Semi Tabacule; Ratu Uluiviti; Eminoni Vuidravuwalu
Girls'	Australia; Brooke Anderson; Marioulla Belessis; Shenae Ciesiolka; Dominique du Toit; Kellie-Marie Gibson; Raecene McGregor; Caitlin Moran; Tiana Penitani; Amber Pilley; Mackenzie Sadler; Tayla Stanford; Laura Waldie	Canada; Moanda Anglo; Catherine Boudreault; Pamphinette Buisa; Hannah Darling; Chanelle Edwards-Challenger; Ashley Gordon; Lauren Kerr; Jenna Morrison; Kaitlyn Richard; Cass Schmidt; Maddy Seatle; Charity Williams	China; Gao Xue; Gao Yueying; Li Tian; Ling Chen; Liu Xiaoqian; Luo Yawen; Shen Yingying; Sun Caihong; Wang Tingting; Wu Fan; Yan Meiling; Yang Feifei
