= Weightlifting at the 2014 Summer Youth Olympics – Girls' +63 kg =

Girls' +63 kg at the II Summer Youth Olympic Games
- Venue: Nanjing International Expo Center
- Dates: August 22, 2014
- Competitors: 12 from 12 nations
- Winning total weight: 244kg

Medalists
1st place, gold medalist(s)		Duangaksorn Chaidee	Thailand
2nd place, silver medalist(s)		Svetlana Shcherbakova	Russia
3rd place, bronze medalist(s)		Tatyana Kapustina	Kazakhstan

The girls' +63 kg weightlifting event was the fifth women's event at the weightlifting competition at the 2014 Summer Youth Olympics, with competitors with at least 63 kg, there was no maximum limit.

Each lifter performed in both the snatch and clean and jerk lifts, with the final score being the sum of the lifter's best result in each. The athlete received three attempts in each of the two lifts; the score for the lift was the heaviest weight successfully lifted.

== Results ==
Rank	Name	Body Weight	Snatch (kg)				Clean & Jerk (kg)				Total (kg)
Rank	Name	Body Weight	1	2	3	Res	1	2	3	Res	Total (kg)
1st place, gold medalist(s)	Duangaksorn Chaidee (THA)	106.14	98	102	106	106	130	135	138	138	244
2nd place, silver medalist(s)	Svetlana Shcherbakova (RUS)	69.28	96	100	103	103	121	125	~~133~~	125	228
3rd place, bronze medalist(s)	Tatyana Kapustina (KAZ)	84.08	98	102	105	105	~~120~~	~~120~~	123	123	228
4	Lisseth Ayoví (ECU)	118.59	95	100	~~104~~	100	120	125	~~129~~	125	225
5	Yeinny Geles (COL)	74.31	93	97	~~100~~	97	117	~~125~~	~~128~~	117	214
6	Kinga Kaczmarczyk (POL)	78.05	85	90	94	94	105	110	~~114~~	110	204
7	Deirdre Lenzsch (USA)	86.09	86	90	~~94~~	90	105	110	~~115~~	110	200
8	Nguyễn Thị Vạn (VIE)	69.67	82	~~86~~	86	86	108	~~111~~	111	111	197
9	Kamila Abdullaeva (UZB)	72.69	85	~~88~~	88	88	103	107	~~112~~	107	195
10	Lenka Rojas (CHI)	76.29	72	~~78~~	78	78	90	96	~~100~~	96	174
11	Arina Kalibiu Arina (SOL)	71.24	60	65	71	71	80	~~85~~	85	156	174
	Boglárka Molnár (HUN)	76.96	71	~~75~~	~~75~~	71	–	–	–	–	–
