= Rugby sevens at the 2014 Summer Youth Olympics – Girls' tournament =

2014 Summer Youth Olympics
- Venue: Youth Olympic Sports Park
- Date: 17 to 20 August 2014

The girls' tournament at the 2014 Summer Youth Olympics was held at the from 17 to 20 August 2014.

== Group stage ==
Pos	Team	Pld	W	D	L	PF	PA	PD	Pts
1	Australia	5	5	0	0	146	17	+129	15
2	China	5	4	0	1	144	32	+112	13
3	Canada	5	3	0	2	108	71	+37	11
4	United States	5	1	1	3	59	98	−39	8
5	Spain	5	1	1	3	44	129	−85	8
6	Tunisia	5	0	0	5	12	166	−154	5

Team 1 \ Team 2	AUS	CAN	ESP	USA	CHN	TUN
Australia	—	21–5	41–0	38–0	15–12	31–0
Canada	5–21	—	31–0	19–14	10–24	43–12
Spain	0–41	0–31	—	12–12	0–45	32–0
United States	0–38	14–19	12–12	—	7–29	26–0
China	12–15	24–5	45–0	29–7	—	34–0
Tunisia	0–31	12–43	0–32	0–26	0–34	—

== Placement rounds ==
Semifinals
Australia	33
United States	0
China	19
Canada	26

Finals
(gold) Australia	38
(silver) Canada	10
Third place
United States	0
(bronze) China	12

Placing 5–6th
Spain	25
Tunisia	5

=== Fifth place game ===
19 August 2014
15:30

Spain	25 - 5	Tunisia

Youth Olympic Sports Park

=== Bronze medal game ===
20 August 2014
09:00

United States	0 - 12	China (bronze)

Youth Olympic Sports Park

=== Gold medal game ===
20 August 2014
09:00

(gold) Australia	38 - 10	Canada (silver)

Youth Olympic Sports Park

== Final ranking ==
Rank	Team
1st place, gold medalist(s)	Australia
2nd place, silver medalist(s)	Canada
3rd place, bronze medalist(s)	China
4	United States
5	Spain
6	Tunisia

== See also ==
- Rugby sevens at the 2014 Summer Youth Olympics – Boys' tournament
