= Gymnastics at the 2014 Summer Youth Olympics – Girls' artistic qualification =

Girls artistic gymnastics qualification at the 2014 Summer Youth Olympics was held at the Nanjing Olympic Sports Centre on August 18. The results of the qualification determined the qualifiers to the finals: 18 gymnasts in the all-around final, and 8 gymnasts in each of 4 apparatus finals.

== Start List ==
Vault (gymnastics)	Uneven bars
Subdivision 1
Puerto Rico	Kazakhstan
Algeria	South Korea
Cayman Islands	Hungary
Iraq	Singapore
Finland	United Kingdom
Portugal	Peru
South Africa	Japan
Subdivision 2
Turkey	Italy
Mexico	China
Czech Republic	Uzbekistan
Poland	Argentina
Belarus	Canada
Egypt	Austria
Switzerland	Philippines
Subdivision 3
Qatar	Netherlands
Greece	Romania
Belgium	Russia
Guatemala	Germany
Tunisia	Norway
Colombia	New Zealand
France	Brazil

== Results ==
Gymnast	Vault		Uneven Bars		Balance Beam		Floor Exercise		Total (All-around)	
Gymnast	Score	Rank	Score	Rank	Score	Rank	Score	Rank	Score	Rank
Seda Tutkhalyan (RUS)	14.600	3	13.000	3	12.900	9	13.150	3	53.650	1
Ellie Downie (GBR)	14.900	1	11.600	15	13.500	2	13.500	2	53.500	2
Laura Jurca (ROU)	14.400	4	12.800	5	13.350	3	12.700	7	53.250	3
Wang Yan (CHN)	13.950	7	13.250	1	14.750	1	11.150	33	53.200	4
Iosra Abdelaziz (ITA)	14.000	6	13.100	2	13.250	4	12.800	4	53.150	5
Flávia Saraiva (BRA)	13.750	9	12.150	10	13.200	5	13.650	1	52.750	6
Antonia Alicke (GER)	13.550	16	12.350	7	12.750	11	12.750	6	51.400	7
Stephanie Hernandez (MEX)	13.550	16	12.150	8	12.950	8	12.450	9	51.150	8
Sae Miyakawa (JPN)	14.750	2	12.850	4	12.000	22	11.300	32	50.900	9
Camille Bahl (FRA)	13.850	8	11.900	13	12.300	17	12.450	10	50.500	10
Gaia Nesurini (SUI)	13.600	14	11.975	12	12.300	17	12.450	10	50.425	11
Ava Verdeflor (PHI)	13.100	28	12.450	6	12.700	13	11.950	20	50.200	12
Sydney Townsend (CAN)	13.300	24	12.050	10	11.550	27	12.500	8	49.375	13
Nadine Joy Nathan (SIN)	13.500	18	11.150	16	12.300	18	12.375	11	49.325	14
Tutya Yilmaz (TUR)	14.050	5	10.300	25	11.800	25	12.800	5	48.950	15
Boglárka Dévai (HUN)	13.650	13	12.000	11	11.150	25	12.800	18	48.900	16
Natallia Yakubava (BLR)	12.850	29	11.650	14	13.150	6	11.050	35	48.700	17
Veronika Cenkova (CZE)	13.200	26	10.300	26	13.100	7	11.800	26	48.400	18
Millie Williamson (NZL)	13.600	14	11.150	18	12.200	19	11.400	22	48.350	19
Martine Skregelid (NOR)	12.850	29	10.550	23	12.750	10	11.850	23	48.000	20
Veronika Orlova (UZB)	13.700	11	10.150	27	11.850	23	12.200	15	47.900	21
Paola Moreira Irizarry (PUR)	13.500	18	10.500	24	11.700	26	12.100	17	47.800	22
Rahma Aldulaimi (QAT)	13.700	11	10.900	20	10.850	32	12.150	26	47.600	23
Arailym Khanseiitova (KAZ)	12.400	36	10.700	21	12.400	16	11.950	20	47.450	24
Isa Maassen (NED)	12.500	34	11.000	19	12.050	21	11.550	27	47.100	25
Nada Ayman Ibrahim (EGY)	13.500	18	8.500	34	12.700	12	11.800	25	46.500	26
Sara Raposeiro (POR)	13.250	25	9.800	29	10.875	35	12.350	12	46.275	27
Agustina Santamaria (ARG)	12.800	31	8.250	36	12.450	15	12.350	13	45.850	28
Evangelia Monokrousou (GRE)	13.350	21	9.950	28	11.400	28	11.150	34	45.850	29
Laura Pardo (COL)	13.750	9	10.650	22	9.800	37	11.400	28	45.600	30
Ceyda Sirbu (AUT)	13.150	27	8.825	33	11.800	24	11.800	24	45.575	31
Katherine Godinez Reyes (GUA)	12.500	34	8.950	32	12.150	20	11.300	18	44.900	32
Mammule Rankoe (RSA)	12.350	37	11.250	16	10.600	34	10.400	37	44.600	33
Hana Park (KOR)	12.150	39	9.750	30	11.000	30	10.825	36	43.725	34
Ana Karina Mendez Reyes (PER)	13.325	23	9.700	31	8.700	39	11.900	22	43.625	35
Monica Sileoni (FIN)	13.350	21	7.450	38	10.350	33	11.300	30	43.600	36
Morgan Lloyd (CAY)	11.700	40	7.900	37	10.350	35	11.300	30	41.250	37
Fatimah Saadi Al-Tameemi (IRQ)	12.350	37	7.400	39	10.200	36	10.000	38	39.950	38
Rahma Mastouri (TUN)	12.700	32	8.300	35	8.600	40	10.000	39	39.600	39
Fatima Mokhtari (ALG)	12.550	33	3.325	40	9.500	38	7.750	40	33.125	40
