= Spain at the 2014 Summer Youth Olympics =

- IOC code: ESP
- NOC: Spanish Olympic Committee
- Website: www.coe.es

in Nanjing
- Competitors: 66 in 16 sports
- Flag bearer: Jesús Tortosa Cabrera
- Medals Ranked 32nd: Gold 2 Silver 1 Bronze 6 Total 9

Summer Youth Olympics appearances (overview)
- 2010; 2014; 2018; 2026

Spain competed at the 2014 Summer Youth Olympics, in Nanjing, China from 16 August to 28 August 2014.

== Medalists ==
Medals awarded to participants of mixed-NOC (Combined) teams are represented in italics. These medals are not counted towards the individual NOC medal tally.

Medal	Name	Sport	Event	Date
Gold	Lucia Togores Carpintero	Basketball	Girls' Shoot-out Contest	21 August
Gold	Noel Del Cerro	Athletics	Boys' Pole Vault	25 August
Silver	Jimena Perez Blanco	Swimming	Girls' 800 m freestyle	19 August
Silver	Carmen Gomez Cortes	Triathlon	Mixed Relay	21 August
Bronze	Jesús Tortosa Cabrera	Taekwondo	Boys' −55 kg	18 August
Bronze	Sara Rodriguez	Judo	Girls' -78 kg	19 August
Bronze	Africa Zamorano Sanz	Swimming	Girls' 200 m backstroke	19 August
Bronze	Camila Morison Rey	Canoeing	Girls' K1 sprint	24 August
Bronze	Ana Begona Calvo Diaz; Laia Flores Costa; Helena Orts I Martinez; Lucia Togores Carpintero	Basketball	Girls' Tournament	26 August
Bronze	Noel Del Cerro	Athletics	Mixed 8x100m Relay	26 August
Bronze	Spain boys' national field hockey team: Manuel Bordas I Fabregas; Jordi Farres Palet; Licas Garcia Alcalde; Marcos Giralt Ripol; Enrique Gonzalez de Castejon Veli; Jan Lara Rosell; Pol Parrilla Suarez; Llorenc Piera Grau; Joan Tarres Fortuny	Field Hockey	Boys' Tournament	27 August

== Sports ==
Event	Boys	Girls	Total
3-on-3 Basketball	4	4	8
Archery		1	1
Athletics	8	4	12
Badminton	1	1	2
Canoeing		1	1
Cycling		2	2
Hockey	9		9
Golf	1	1	2
Judo		1	1
Modern Pentathlon	1	1	2
Rowing		2	2
Rugby sevens		12	12
Sailing		1	1
Swimming	4	4	8
Taekwondo	1		1
Triathlon	1	1	2
TOTAL	30	36	66

== 3-on-3 Basketball ==
Spain qualified a female team due to their third position at the 2013 FIBA World Championship Female 3x3 Basket. Later Spain qualified a boys' team based on the 1 June 2014 FIBA 3x3 National Federation Rankings.

Skills Competition

Athlete	Event	Qualification				Final First Stage				Final Second Stage			
Athlete	Event	Round 1	Round 2	Total	Rank	Round 1	Round 2	Total	Rank	Round 1	Round 2	Total	Rank
Adnan Omeragic Alic	Boys' Dunk Contest	29	24	53	2 Q	28	15	43	4	Did not advance			4

Athlete	Event	Qualification			Final		
Athlete	Event	Points	Time	Rank	Points	Time	Rank
Ana Begona Calvo Diaz	Girls' Shoot-out Contest	4	21.6	20	Did not advance		
Laia Flores Costa	Girls' Shoot-out Contest	5	24.3	11	Did not advance		
Helena Orts I Martinez	Girls' Shoot-out Contest	1	27.2	56	Did not advance		
Lucia Togores Carpintero	Girls' Shoot-out Contest	7	23.4	2 Q	7	32.6	1st place, gold medalist(s)

=== Boys' tournament ===
Roster

- Adnan Omeragic Alic
- Xabier Oroz Uria
- Eduardo Sanchez Arevalo
- Arnau Triginer I Solanas

Group stage

Pos	Team	Pld	W	L	PF	PA	PD	Pts	Qualification
1	Argentina	9	7	2	156	101	+55	16	Round of 16
2	Russia	9	7	2	153	117	+36	16	Round of 16
3	Spain	9	7	2	145	135	+10	16	Round of 16
4	New Zealand	9	6	3	145	129	+16	15	Round of 16
5	Venezuela	9	5	4	136	128	+8	14	Round of 16
6	Brazil	9	4	5	116	92	+24	13 (Note: BRA +5, ROU −5)	Round of 16
7	Romania	9	4	5	130	122	+8	13	Round of 16
8	Tunisia	9	3	6	115	130	−15	12	Round of 16
9	Andorra	9	2	7	129	168	−39	11	Eliminated
10	Guatemala	9	0	9	74	177	−103	9	Eliminated

Notes:

18 August 2014
17:20

Spain	16–11	Tunisia

Wutaishan Sports Center, Nanjing

18 August 2014
21:40

Andorra	18–21	Spain

Wutaishan Sports Center, Nanjing

19 August 2014
19:40

Spain	16–15	Russia

Wutaishan Sports Center, Nanjing

20 August 2014
18:20

Spain	12–11	Brazil

Wutaishan Sports Center, Nanjing

20 August 2014
21:20

Romania	16–13	Spain

Wutaishan Sports Center, Nanjing

22 August 2014
19:40

Spain	14–21	New Zealand

Wutaishan Sports Center, Nanjing

23 August 2014
17:40

Guatemala	14–21	Spain

Wutaishan Sports Center, Nanjing

23 August 2014
21:00

Spain	15–14	Venezuela

Wutaishan Sports Center, Nanjing

24 August 2014
19:40

Argentina	15–17	Spain

Wutaishan Sports Center, Nanjing

Knockout Stage

Round of 16	Quarterfinals	Semifinals	Final	Rank
Opposition Score	Opposition Score	Opposition Score	Opposition Score	Rank
France; L 10-18	did not advance			10

=== Girls' tournament ===
Roster

- Ana Begona Calvo Diaz
- Laia Flores Costa
- Helena Orts I Martinez
- Lucia Togores Carpintero

Group stage

Pos	Team	Pld	W	D	L	PF	PA	PD	Pts	Qualification
1	Netherlands	9	8	0	1	164	87	+77	24	Round of 16
2	Hungary	9	8	0	1	146	91	+55	24	Round of 16
3	Spain	9	7	0	2	151	95	+56	21	Round of 16
4	Estonia	9	5	0	4	130	109	+21	15	Round of 16
5	China	9	5	0	4	128	103	+25	15	Round of 16
6	Germany	9	4	0	5	111	133	−22	12	Round of 16
7	Brazil	9	3	0	6	101	123	−22	9	Round of 16
8	Venezuela	9	2	0	7	101	153	−52	6	Round of 16
9	Slovenia	9	2	0	7	120	156	−36	6	Eliminated
10	Syria	9	1	0	8	68	170	−102	3	Eliminated

18 August 2014
19:00

Spain	21–4	Syria

Wutaishan Sports Center, Nanjing

19 August 2014
18:20

Hungary	16–11	Spain

Wutaishan Sports Center, Nanjing

19 August 2014
21:20

Spain	21–7	Slovenia

Wutaishan Sports Center, Nanjing

20 August 2014
20:00

Spain	16–13	Germany

Wutaishan Sports Center, Nanjing

22 August 2014
18:00

Brazil	7–16	Spain

Wutaishan Sports Center, Nanjing

22 August 2014
21:20

Spain	12–13	Netherlands

Wutaishan Sports Center, Nanjing

23 August 2014
19:20

China	vs.	Spain

Wutaishan Sports Center, Nanjing

24 August 2014
17:40

Spain	20–11	Estonia

Wutaishan Sports Center, Nanjing

24 August 2014
21:20

Venezuela	vs.	Spain

Wutaishan Sports Center, Nanjing

Knockout Stage

Round of 16	Quarterfinals	Semifinals	Final	Rank
Opposition Score	Opposition Score	Opposition Score	Opposition Score	Rank
Romania; W 18-14	Belgium; W 16-14	Netherlands; L 7-11	Hungary; W 12-11	3rd place, bronze medalist(s)

== Archery ==
Spain qualified a female archer from its performance at the 2013 World Archery Youth Championships.

Individual

Athlete	Event	Ranking round		Round of 32	Round of 16	Quarterfinals	Semifinals	Final / BM	Rank
Athlete	Event	Score	Seed	Opposition Score	Opposition Score	Opposition Score	Opposition Score	Opposition Score	Rank
Alica Marin	Girls' Individual	664	4	Zamirova (TJK); W 6–0	Laharnar (SLO); W 6–2	Gaubil (FRA); L 2–6	Did not advance		7

Team

Athletes	Event	Ranking round		Round of 32	Round of 16	Quarterfinals	Semifinals	Final / BM	Rank
Athletes	Event	Score	Seed	Opposition Score	Opposition Score	Opposition Score	Opposition Score	Opposition Score	Rank
Alicia Marin (ESP); Ali El Ghrari (LBA)	Mixed Team	1275	23	Koike (JPN); Denny (GBR); L 4-5	Did not advance				17

== Athletics ==
Spain qualified 12 athletes.

Qualification Legend: Q=Final A (medal); qB=Final B (non-medal); qC=Final C (non-medal); qD=Final D (non-medal); qE=Final E (non-medal)

Boys
Track & road events

Athlete	Event	Heats		Final	
Athlete	Event	Result	Rank	Result	Rank
Aitor Same Ekobo	100 m	10.73	5 Q	10.71	4
Jesús Serrano	400 m	48.13	8 Q	48.61	8
Jordi Torrents	3000 m	8:13.89 PB	3 Q	8:09.99 PB	5
Juan José Garrantxo	110 m hurdles	13.57	5 Q	13.59	5
Manuel Bermudez	10 km walk	—N/a		44:12.55	6

Field Events

Athlete	Event	Qualification		Final	
Athlete	Event	Distance	Rank	Distance	Rank
Alejandro Kedar	Triple jump	14.98	10 qB	14.96	2
Noel Del Cerro	Pole vault	4.90	3 Q	5.10 PB	1st place, gold medalist(s)
Manuel Quijera	Javelin throw	68.32 PB	12 qB	69.05 PB	2

Girls
Track & road events

Athlete	Event	Heats		Final	
Athlete	Event	Result	Rank	Result	Rank
Celia Antón	800 m	2:11.48	13 qB	2:11.12	2
Irene Vázquez	5 km walk	—N/a		24:22.76	6

Field events

Athlete	Event	Qualification		Final	
Athlete	Event	Distance	Rank	Distance	Rank
Noemi Sempere	Long jump	5.49	12 qB	5.53	3
Ana Garijo	Triple jump	12.09	12 qB	12.04	5

== Badminton ==
Spain qualified two athletes based on the 2 May 2014 BWF Junior World Rankings.

Singles

Athlete	Event	Group stage				Quarterfinal	Semifinal	Final / BM	Rank
Athlete	Event	Opposition Score	Opposition Score	Opposition Score	Rank	Opposition Score	Opposition Score	Opposition Score	Rank
Enrique Penalver	Boys' Singles	Jakowczuk (POL); W 2-0	Mihigo (UGA); W 2-0	Tsuneyama (JPN); L 0-2	2	did not advance			
Clara Azurmendi	Girls' Singles	Doha (EGY); W 2-0	Macias (PER); W 2-0	Solis (MEX); W 2-0	1QF	He (CHN); L 0-2	did not advance		5

Doubles

Athlete	Event	Group stage				Quarterfinal	Semifinal	Final / BM	Rank
Athlete	Event	Opposition Score	Opposition Score	Opposition Score	Rank	Opposition Score	Opposition Score	Opposition Score	Rank
Chlorie Cadeau (SEY); Enrique Penalver (ESP)	Mixed Doubles	Narongrit (THA); Qin (CHN); L 0-2	Guda (AUS); Hartawan (INA); L 0-2	Mananga Nzoussi (CGO); Blichfeldt (DEN); W 2-0	3	did not advance			
Clara Azurmendi (ESP); Krzysztof Jakowczuk (POL)	Mixed Doubles	Dhami (NEP); Ongbumrungpan (THA); L 1-2	Tsuneyama (JPN); Lee (TPE); L 0-2	Lee (HKG); Konieczna (POL); L 1-2	4	did not advance			

== Canoeing ==
Spain qualified one athlete based on its performance at the 2013 World Junior Canoe Sprint and Slalom Championships.

Girls

Athlete	Event	Qualification		Repechage		Round of 16		Quarterfinals	Semifinals	Final / BM	Rank
Athlete	Event	Time	Rank	Time	Rank	Time	Rank	Opposition Result	Opposition Result	Opposition Result	Rank
Camila Morison Rey	K1 slalom	1:39.448	17 R	1:43.028	8 Q	1:40.162	15	Did not advance			15
Camila Morison Rey	K1 sprint	1:48.391	3 Q	—N/a		1:50.387	4 Q	de Sousa (BRA); W 1:48.223	Homonnai (HUN); L 1:58.032	Kaletenberger (KAZ); W 1:55.529	3rd place, bronze medalist(s)

== Cycling ==
Spain qualified a girls' team based on its ranking issued by the UCI.

Team

Athletes	Event	Cross-Country Eliminator		Time Trial			BMX		Cross-Country Race			Road Race			Total Pts	Rank
Athletes	Event	Rank	Points	Time	Rank	Points	Rank	Points	Time	Rank	Points	Time	Rank	Points	Total Pts	Rank
Elisabet Escursell Valero; Maria Rodriguez Navarrete	Girls' Team	8	20	6:15.37	15	2	8	40	50:43	17	0	1:12:36; 1:12:36	24; 26	0	62	21

Mixed Relay

Athletes	Event	Cross-Country Girls' Race	Cross-Country Boys' Race	Boys' Road Race	Girls' Road Race	Total Time	Rank
Maria Rodriguez Navarrete (ESP); Realdo Ramaliu (ALB); Ridion Kopshti (ALB); Elisabet Escursell Valero (ESP)	Mixed Team Relay					19:33	18

== Field hockey ==
Spain qualified a male team from its victory at the 2013 European sub-18 Field-Hockey Championship.

=== Boys' tournament ===
Roster

- Manuel Bordas I Fabregas
- Jordi Farres Palet
- Licas Garcia Alcalde
- Marcos Giralt Ripol
- Enrique Gonzalez de Castejon Veli
- Jan Lara Rosell
- Pol Parrilla Suarez
- Llorenc Piera Grau
- Joan Tarres Fortuny

Group stage

Pos	Team	Pld	W	D	L	GF	GA	GD	Pts	Qualification
1	Spain	4	4	0	0	28	10	+18	12	Quarterfinals
2	Australia	4	2	0	2	21	17	+4	6	Quarterfinals
3	Canada	4	2	0	2	14	13	+1	6	Quarterfinals
4	South Africa	4	2	0	2	11	19	−8	6	Quarterfinals
5	Bangladesh	4	0	0	4	7	22	−15	0	

Source: FIH
Rules for classification: 1) points; 2) goal difference; 3) goals scored; 4) head-to-head result.

17 August 2014
17:30

Spain	9–1	Bangladesh
Suarez 2', 11', 35'; Fortuny 5'; Castejon 6', 14'; Alcalde 8'; Fabregas 23', 24'	Report	Babu 36'

Umpires:
Rawi Anbananthan (MAS)
Epeli Tukuca (FIJ)

18 August 2014
19:30

Spain	6–3	Canada
Fortuny 5', 33'; Castejon 10', 26'; Palet 30', 36'	Report	Sandhu 12', 30'; Panesar 36'

Umpires:
Oliver Tarnoczi (AUT)
Duvaughn Henlon (JAM)

20 August 2014
17:30

Spain	7–6	Australia
Fabregas 5'; Castejon 16', 31'; Rosell 19'; Grau 21'; Palet 22'; Alcalde 26'	Report	Stewart 1'; Bird 3'; Weyer 4', 36'; Hendry 13'; Bretherton 29'

Umpires:
Rawi Anbananthan (MAS)
Duvaughn Henlon (JAM)

21 August 2014
19:30

South Africa	0–6	Spain
	Report	Castejon 3', 30'; Rossell 7', 18'; Fortuny 17', 24'

Umpires:
Aziz Adimah (GHA)
Sherif Elamari (EGY)

Quarterfinal

23 August 2014
19:00

Spain	10–1	Zambia
Suarez 3', 20'; Rosell 4', 29'; Fabregas 7'; Grau 19'; Fortuny 21', 30'; Castejon 34'; Alcalde 36'	Report	Tagwireyi 26'

Umpires:
Epeli Tukuca (FIJ)
Scott Embry (AUS)

Semifinal

25 August 2014
18:00

Spain	4–4	Canada
Fabregas 2'; Palet 4'; Castejon 13'; Alcalde 30'	Report	A. Sidhu 7', 31'; Sandhu 24'; Panesar 36'
Penalties
Fabregas (penalty shoot-out missed); Castejon (penalty shoot-out scored); Suarez (penalty shoot-out scored); Castejon (penalty shoot-out scored); Suarez (penalty shoot-out scored); Fabregas (penalty shoot-out scored); Castejon (penalty shoot-out missed)	5–6	(penalty shoot-out scored) A. Sidhu; (penalty shoot-out missed) Panesar; (penalty shoot-out scored) Sandhu; (penalty shoot-out scored) A. Sidhu; (penalty shoot-out scored) Panesar; (penalty shoot-out scored) Sandhu; (penalty shoot-out scored) A. Sidhu

Umpires:
Donovan Simmons (BER)
Oliver Tarnoczi (AUT)

Bronze medal match

27 August 2014
19:00

Spain (bronze)	7–4	South Africa
Palet 7', 15'; Suarez 9'; Alcalde 19'; Rosell 20'; Fabregas 34'; Fortuny 36'	Report	Kok 18', 23'; Ntuli 24'; Bleeker 34'

Umpires:
Rawi Anbananthan (MAS)
Donovan Simmons (BER)

== Golf ==
Spain qualified one team of two athletes based on the 8 June 2014 IGF Combined World Amateur Golf Rankings.

Individual

Athlete	Event	Round 1	Round 2	Round 3	Total	
Athlete	Event	Score	Score	Score	Score	Rank
Iván Cantero	Boys	70	73	76	219	T20
Celia Barquín Arozamena	Girls	73	75	73	221	T12

Team

Athletes	Event	Round 1 (Foursome)	Round 2 (Fourball)	Round 3 (Individual stroke)		Total	
Athletes	Event	Score	Score	Boy	Girl	Score	Rank
Iván Cantero; Celia Barquín Arozamena	Mixed	68	77	70	75	290	T17

== Judo ==
Spain qualified one athlete based on its performance at the 2013 Cadet World Judo Championships.

Individual

Athlete	Event	Round of 16	Quarterfinals	Semifinals	Rep 1	Rep 2	Rep 3	Final / BM	Rank
Athlete	Event	Opposition Result	Opposition Result	Opposition Result	Opposition Result	Opposition Result	Opposition Result	Opposition Result	Rank
Sara Rodriguez	Girls' -78 kg	—N/a	Samardzic (BIH); L 000-000	Did not advance	—N/a	Wang (TPE); W 100-000	de Bruine (AUS); W 010-000	Snyman (RSA); W 000-000	3rd place, bronze medalist(s)

Team

Athletes	Event	Round of 16	Quarterfinals	Semifinals	Final	Rank
Athletes	Event	Opposition Result	Opposition Result	Opposition Result	Opposition Result	Rank
Team Yamashita; Frank de Wit (NED); Nellie Einstein (SWE); Sandrine Mbazoghe Endamne (GAB); Lubjana Piovesana (GBR); Sara Rodriguez (ESP); Tsogtbaatar Tsend-Ochir (MGL); Jorre Verstraeten (BEL)	Mixed Team	Team Douillet (MIX); L 3^{112} – 3^{200}	Did not advance			9

== Modern Pentathlon ==
Spain qualified one athlete based on its performance at the 2014 Youth A World Championships and another based on the 1 June 2014 Olympic Youth A Pentathlon World Rankings.

Athlete	Event	Fencing Ranking Round (épée one touch)		Swimming (200 m freestyle)			Fencing Final round (épée one touch)			Combined: Shooting/Running (10 m air pistol)/(3000 m)			Total Points	Final Rank
Athlete	Event	Results	Rank	Time	Rank	Points	Results	Rank	Points	Time	Rank	Points	Total Points	Final Rank
Joan Gispert	Boys' Individual													14
Aroa Freije	Girls' Individual				1	295								15
Joan Gispert (ESP); Isabel Brand (GUA)	Mixed Relay													
Aroa Freije Torneiro (ESP); Brendan Anderson (USA)	Mixed Relay	18-28	20	2:00.05	3	340		20	243	12:12.93	6	568	1151	11

== Rowing ==
Spain qualified one boat based on its performance at the 2013 World Rowing Junior Championships.

Athlete	Event	Heats		Repechage		Final	
Athlete	Event	Time	Rank	Time	Rank	Time	Rank
Maria Lao Sanchez; Valeria Palma Vallejo	Girls' Pairs	3:42.53	5 R	3:47.10	4 FB	4:04.01	11

Qualification Legend: FA=Final A (medal); FB=Final B (non-medal); FC=Final C (non-medal); FD=Final D (non-medal); SA/B=Semifinals A/B; SC/D=Semifinals C/D; R=Repechage

== Rugby sevens ==
Spain qualified a female team from their fourth position at the 2013 Rugby Sevens World Cup, being the best ranked European team.

=== Girls' tournament ===
Roster

- Maitane Berasaluce Heras
- Teresa Bueso Gomez
- Amaia Erbina Arana
- Raquel Garcia Godin
- Ainhoa Garcia Terron
- Hannah Gascoigne Gomez de Bonill
- Florencia Paulos
- Anna Ramon Guardia
- Marina Seral Arespacochaga
- Ana Tortosa Reyes
- Ana Vila Sanchez
- Paula Xutgla Reixach

Group stage

Pos	Team	Pld	W	D	L	PF	PA	PD	Pts
1	Australia	5	5	0	0	146	17	+129	15
2	China	5	4	0	1	144	32	+112	13
3	Canada	5	3	0	2	108	71	+37	11
4	United States	5	1	1	3	59	98	−39	8
5	Spain	5	1	1	3	44	129	−85	8
6	Tunisia	5	0	0	5	12	166	−154	5

17 August 2014
10:00

Spain	12 - 12	United States

Youth Olympic Sports Park

17 August 2014
17:00

Spain	32 - 0	Tunisia

Youth Olympic Sports Park

18 August 2014
09:30

Canada	31 - 0	Spain

Youth Olympic Sports Park

18 August 2014
17:00

Australia	39 - 0	Spain

Youth Olympic Sports Park

19 August 2014
09:30

Spain	0 - 45	China

Youth Olympic Sports Park

Placing 5-6

19 August 2014
15:30

Spain 5th	25 - 5	Tunisia

Youth Olympic Sports Park

== Sailing ==
Spain qualified one boat based on its performance at the 2014 Techno 293 European Championships in Torbole, Garda, Italy.

Athlete	Event	Race											Net Points	Final Rank
Athlete	Event	1	2	3	4	5	6	7	8	9	10	M*	Net Points	Final Rank
María Fatou Losada	Girls' Techno 293	14	8	(22); DSQ	17	16	7	9	Cancelled			93.00	71.00	14

== Swimming ==
Spain qualified eight swimmers.

Boys

Athlete	Event	Heat		Semifinal		Final	
Athlete	Event	Time	Rank	Time	Rank	Time	Rank
Juan Pablo Marin Sanchez	50 m freestyle	24.12	27	Did not advance			
Juan Pablo Marin Sanchez	100 m freestyle	51.79	22	Did not advance			
Juan Pablo Marin Sanchez	200 m freestyle	1:53.58	23	—N/a		Did not advance	
Marc Vivas Egea	200 m freestyle	1:52.31	14	—N/a		Did not advance	
Marc Vivas Egea	400 m freestyle	3:56.35	13	—N/a		Did not advance	
Marc Vivas Egea	800 m freestyle	—N/a				8:23.65	19
Guillerm Sanchez Gutierrez-Cabello	400 m freestyle	3:55.32	8 Q	—N/a		3:56.08	8
Guillerm Sanchez Gutierrez-Cabello	200 m individual medley	2:03.59	5 Q	—N/a		2:03.37	5
Gonzalo Carazo Barbero	100 m breaststroke	1:03.84	19	Did not advance			
Gonzalo Carazo Barbero	200 m individual medley	2:06.24	14	—N/a		Did not advance	
Gonzalo Carazo Barbero; Juan Pablo Marin Sanchez; Guillerm Sanchez Gutierrez-Cabello; Marc Vivas Egea	4 × 100 m freestyle relay	3:27.61	5 Q	—N/a		3:26.74	6
Gonzalo Carazo Barbero; Juan Pablo Marin Sanchez; Guillerm Sanchez Gutierrez-Cabello; Marc Vivas Egea	4 × 100 m medley relay	3:55.02	7 Q	—N/a		3:50.46	6

Girls

Athlete	Event	Heat		Semifinal		Final	
Athlete	Event	Time	Rank	Time	Rank	Time	Rank
Sandra Pallares Gomez	100 m freestyle	58.20	24	Did not advance			
Sandra Pallares Gomez	200 m freestyle	2:05.05	23	—N/a		Did not advance	
Sandra Pallares Gomez	400 m freestyle	4:18.98	17	—N/a		Did not advance	
Africa Zamorano Sanz	200 m freestyle	2:02.26	11	—N/a		Did not advance	
Africa Zamorano Sanz	100 m backstroke	—N/a					
Africa Zamorano Sanz	200 m backstroke	2:14.47	5 Q	—N/a		2:11.94	3rd place, bronze medalist(s)
Africa Zamorano Sanz	200 m individual medley	2:15.60	4 Q	—N/a		2:14.18	4
Jimena Perez Blanco	400 m freestyle	4:16.53	12	—N/a		Did not advance	
Jimena Perez Blanco	800 m freestyle	—N/a				8:36.95	2nd place, silver medalist(s)
Jimena Perez Blanco	200 m butterfly	2:13.90	8 Q	—N/a		2:15.36	8
Jimena Perez Blanco	200 m individual medley	2:18.34	10	—N/a		Did not advance	
Laura Yus Fernandez	50 m backstroke	29.84	16 Q	29.99	16	Did not advance	
Laura Yus Fernandez	100 m backstroke	1:03.01	10 Q	1:03.17	13	Did not advance	
Laura Yus Fernandez	200 m backstroke	2:19.59	21	—N/a		Did not advance	
Sandra Gomez Pallares; Jimena Perez Blanco; Laura Yus Fernandez; Africa Zamorano Sanz	4 × 100 m medley relay	4:17.48	10	—N/a		Did not advance	

Mixed

Athlete	Event	Heat		Final	
Athlete	Event	Time	Rank	Time	Rank
Gonzalo Carazo Barbero; Juan Pablo Marin Sanchez; Sandra Pallares Gomez; Africa Zamorano Sanz	4 × 100 m freestyle relay	3:38.13	8 Q	3:38.10	8
Gonzalo Carazo Barbero; Juan Pablo Marin Sanchez; Sandra Pallares Gomez; Laura Yus Fernandez	4 × 100 m medley relay	3:58.95	6 Q	3:59.71	8

== Taekwondo ==
Spain qualified one athlete based on its performance at the Taekwondo Qualification Tournament.

Boys

Athlete	Event	Round of 16	Quarterfinals	Semifinals	Final	Rank
Athlete	Event	Opposition Result	Opposition Result	Opposition Result	Opposition Result	Rank
Jesús Tortosa	−55 kg	Nguema (GEQ); W DSQ	Ghonim (EGY); W 14 (PTG) - 2	Huang (TPE); L 1 - 7	Did not advance	3rd place, bronze medalist(s)

== Triathlon ==
Spain qualified two athletes based on its performance at the 2014 European Youth Olympic Games Qualifier.

Individual

Athlete	Event	Swim (750m)	Trans 1	Bike (20 km)	Trans 2	Run (5 km)	Total Time	Rank
Alberto Gonzalez Garcia	Boys	09:29	00:42	28:53	00:23	16:10	0:55:37	6
Carmen Gomez Cortes	Girls	10:20	00:46	31:32	00:27	19:02	1:02:07	9

Relay

Athlete	Event	Total Times per Athlete (Swim 250m, Bike 6.6 km, Run 1.8 km)	Total Group Time	Rank
Europe 3 Sian Rainsley (GBR); Giulio Soldati (ITA); Carmen Gomez Cortes (ESP); Bence Lehmann (HUN)	Mixed Relay	21:23; 20:01; 21:23; 19:43	1:22:30	2nd place, silver medalist(s)
Europe 2 Elizaveta Zhizhina (RUS); Alberto Gonzalez Garcia (ESP); Kirsten Nuyes (NED); Peer Sonksen (GER)	Mixed Relay	21:39; 19:33; 23:12; 19:51	1:24:15	5
