= Rugby sevens at the 2014 Summer Youth Olympics – Boys' tournament =

2014 Summer Youth Olympics
- Venue: Youth Olympic Sports Park
- Date: 17 to 20 August 2014

The boys' tournament at the 2014 Summer Youth Olympics was held at the from 17 to 20 August 2014.

== Group stage ==
| Pos | Team | Pld | W | D | L | PF | PA | PD | Pts |
|---|---|---|---|---|---|---|---|---|---|
| 1 | Argentina | 5 | 5 | 0 | 0 | 145 | 34 | +111 | 15 |
| 2 | France | 5 | 4 | 0 | 1 | 98 | 55 | +43 | 13 |
| 3 | Fiji | 5 | 2 | 0 | 3 | 82 | 70 | +12 | 9 |
| 4 | Kenya | 5 | 2 | 0 | 3 | 68 | 107 | −39 | 9 |
| 5 | Japan | 5 | 2 | 0 | 3 | 73 | 131 | −58 | 9 |
| 6 | United States | 5 | 0 | 0 | 5 | 59 | 128 | −69 | 5 |

| Team 1 \ Team 2 | FIJ | KEN | ARG | FRA | USA | JPN |
|---|---|---|---|---|---|---|
| Fiji | — | 12–17 | 0–21 | 12–17 | 29–10 | 29–5 |
| Kenya | 17–12 | — | 5–32 | 0–24 | 22–12 | 24–27 |
| Argentina | 21–0 | 32–5 | — | 19–7 | 33–10 | 40–12 |
| France | 17–12 | 24–0 | 7–19 | — | 22–17 | 28–7 |
| United States | 10–29 | 12–22 | 10–33 | 17–22 | — | 10–22 |
| Japan | 5–29 | 27–24 | 12–40 | 7–28 | 22–10 | — |

== Placement rounds ==
Semifinals
Argentina | 19
Kenya | 12
France | 34
Fiji | 12

Finals
(silver) Argentina | 22
(gold) France | 45
Third place
Kenya | 0
(bronze) Fiji | 12

| Placing 5–6th |
| Japan | 12 |
| United States | 29 |

=== Fifth place game ===
19 August 2014
15:30

| Japan | 12–29 | United States |

Youth Olympic Sports Park

=== Bronze medal game ===
20 August 2014
09:00

| Kenya | 0 - 12 | Fiji (bronze) |

Youth Olympic Sports Park

=== Gold medal game ===
20 August 2014
09:00

| (silver) Argentina | 22 - 45 | France (gold) |

Youth Olympic Sports Park

== Final ranking ==
| Rank | Team |
|---|---|
| 1st place, gold medalist(s) | France |
| 2nd place, silver medalist(s) | Argentina |
| 3rd place, bronze medalist(s) | Fiji |
| 4 | Kenya |
| 5 | United States |
| 6 | Japan |

== See also ==
- Rugby sevens at the 2014 Summer Youth Olympics – Girls' tournament
