= Mastouri =

Mastouri is a Tunisian surname. Notable people with the surname include:

- Djamel Mastouri (born 1972), French Paralympian athlete
- Hazem Mastouri (born 1997), Tunisian footballer
- Rahma Mastouri (born 1999), Tunisian artistic gymnast
