= Athletics at the 2014 Summer Youth Olympics – Boys' 200 metres =

Athletics – Boys' 200 metres at the II Summer Youth Olympic Games
- Venue: Nanjing Olympic Sports Centre
- Date: August 22–24
- Competitors: 23 from 23 nations

Medalists
1st place, gold medalist(s)		Noah Lyles	United States
2nd place, silver medalist(s)		Baboloki Thebe	Botswana
3rd place, bronze medalist(s)		Yang Chun-han	Chinese Taipei

The boys’ 200 m competition at the 2014 Summer Youth Olympics was held on 22–24 August 2014 in Nanjing Olympic Sports Center.

== Schedule ==
Date	Time	Round
22 August 2014	20:05	Heats
24 August 2014	21:25	Final

== Results ==
=== Heats ===
Eight fastest athletes advanced to Final A, the others advanced to Final B, or C according to their times.

Rank	Heat	Lane	Athlete	Result	Notes	Q
1	1	3	Noah Lyles (USA)	20.71	PB	FA
2	2	4	Baboloki Thebe (BOT)	20.99		FA
3	3	8	Yang Chun-han (TPE)	21.03	PB	FA
4	1	8	Jun Yamashita (JPN)	21.11	PB	FA
5	2	3	Chad Walker (JAM)	21.17		FA
6	3	6	Filippo Tortu (ITA)	21.38	PB	FA
7	3	5	Brian Kasinda (ZAM)	21.40		FA
8	1	5	Akanni Hislop (TTO)	21.42		FA
9	3	2	Aliffer dos Santos (BRA)	21.64		FB
10	1	7	Jordan Csabi (AUS)	21.70		FB
11	1	6	Erick Joel Sánchez (DOM)	21.72	PB	FB
12	2	9	Shermar Paul (CAN)	21.80		FB
13	2	5	Ramarco Thompson (BAR)	21.95		FB
14	1	4	Wojciech Kaczor (POL)	22.01		FB
15	2	2	Coull Graham (ANT)	22.08		FB
16	3	9	Naludol Asavaruengsri (THA)	22.21		FB
17	3	7	Dwayne Koroka (PNG)	22.38	PB	FC
18	2	8	Kionje Somner (BER)	22.39		FC
19	3	3	Vladislav Grigoriyev (KAZ)	22.40		FC
20	2	7	Eugene Kohun (ISV)	22.60		FC
21	3	4	Harouna Ndaye Abraham (CHA)	23.19		FC
22	2	6	Mas Wafiyyuddin Sharani (BRU)	23.44	PB	FC
	1	2	Jorge Sánchez (PUR)	DNF		FC

=== Finals ===
==== Final A ====
Rank	Final Placing	Lane	Athlete	Result	Notes
1st place, gold medalist(s)	1	7	Noah Lyles (USA)	20.80	
2nd place, silver medalist(s)	2	6	Baboloki Thebe (BOT)	21.20	
3rd place, bronze medalist(s)	3	4	Yang Chun-han (TPE)	21.31	
4	4	2	Akanni Hislop (TTO)	21.57	
5	5	3	Brian Kasinda (ZAM)	21.61	
6	6	5	Jun Yamashita (JPN)	21.62	
		8	Chad Walker (JAM)	DSQ	
		9	Filippo Tortu (ITA)	DNS	

==== Final B ====
Rank	Final Placing	Lane	Athlete	Result	Notes
1	7	4	Aliffer dos Santos (BRA)	21.68	
2	8	5	Jordan Csabi (AUS)	21.84	
3	9	7	Erick Joel Sánchez (DOM)	21.89	
4	10	6	Shermar Paul (CAN)	21.93	
5	11	8	Ramarco Thompson (BAR)	22.31	
6	12	2	Coull Graham (ANT)	22.34	
7	13	3	Naludol Asavaruengsri (THA)	22.44	
		9	Wojciech Kaczor (POL)	DSQ	

==== Final C ====
Rank	Final Placing	Lane	Athlete	Result	Notes
1	14	5	Kionje Somner (BER)	22.28	PB
2	15	6	Dwayne Koroka (PNG)	22.69	
3	16	3	Vladislav Grigoriyev (KAZ)	22.83	
4	17	4	Eugene Kohun (ISV)	22.84	
5	18	7	Mas Wafiyyuddin Sharani (BRU)	23.66	
		8	Harouna Ndaye Abraham (CHA)	DSQ	
		2	Jorge Sánchez (PUR)	DNS	
