= Brunei at the 2014 Summer Youth Olympics =

- IOC code: BRU
- NOC: Brunei Darussalam National Olympic Council

in Nanjing
- Competitors: 3 in 2 sports

Summer Youth Olympics appearances
- 2010; 2014; 2018

Brunei competed at the 2014 Summer Youth Olympics, in Nanjing, China from 16 August to 28 August 2014.

== Athletics ==
Brunei qualified two athletes.

Qualification Legend: Q=Final A (medal); qB=Final B (non-medal); qC=Final C (non-medal); qD=Final D (non-medal); qE=Final E (non-medal)

Boys
Track & road events

Athlete	Event	Heats		Final	
Athlete	Event	Result	Rank	Result	Rank
Mas Sharani	200 m	23.44	22 qC	23.66	18

Girls
Track & road events

Athlete	Event	Heats		Final	
Athlete	Event	Result	Rank	Result	Rank
Hannah Jamal Hasim	400 m	1:04.86	20 qC	1:03.98	20

== Fencing ==
Brunei was given a quota to compete by the tripartite committee.

Boys

Athlete	Event	Pool Round	Seed	Round of 16	Quarterfinals	Semifinals	Final / BM	Rank
Athlete	Event	Opposition Score	Seed	Opposition Score	Opposition Score	Opposition Score	Opposition Score	Rank
Anaqi Muhammad	Sabre	P di Martino (ARG); L 1 - 5 N Shengelia (GEO); W 5 - 2 F Ferjani (TUN); L 0 - 5 N Kassymov (KAZ); L 3 - 5 M Giakoumatos (GRE); L 1 - 5 K Metryka (USA); L 0 - 5	13	F Ferjani (TUN); L 5 - 15	did not advance			14
