= Kazakhstan at the 2014 Summer Youth Olympics =

- IOC code: KAZ
- NOC: Kazakhstan Olympic Committee

in Nanjing
- Competitors: 51 in 17 sports
- Medals Ranked 21st: Gold 3 Silver 1 Bronze 4 Total 8

Summer Youth Olympics appearances (overview)
- 2010; 2014; 2018

Kazakhstan competed at the 2014 Summer Youth Olympics, in Nanjing, China from 16 August to 28 August 2014.

== Archery ==
Kazakhstan qualified a female archer from its performance at the 2013 Asian Archery Championships.

Individual

Athlete	Event	Ranking round		Round of 32	Round of 16	Quarterfinals	Semifinals	Final / BM	Rank
Athlete	Event	Score	Seed	Opposition Score	Opposition Score	Opposition Score	Opposition Score	Opposition Score	Rank
Aruzhan Abdrazak	Girls' Individual	578	30	Li (CHN); L 3–7	Did not advance				17

Team

Athletes	Event	Ranking round		Round of 32	Round of 16	Quarterfinals	Semifinals	Final / BM	Rank
Athletes	Event	Score	Seed	Opposition Score	Opposition Score	Opposition Score	Opposition Score	Opposition Score	Rank
Aruzhan Abdrazak (KAZ); Marcus Vinicius D'Almeida (BRA)	Mixed Team	1261	29	Gencheva (BUL); Faber (SUI); W 6-0	Boda (IND); Dachev (BUL); W 6-2	Tuokkola (FIN); Peters (CAN); L 2-6	Did not advance		6

== Athletics ==
Kazakhstan qualified six athletes.

Qualification Legend: Q=Final A (medal); qB=Final B (non-medal); qC=Final C (non-medal); qD=Final D (non-medal); qE=Final E (non-medal)

Boys
Track & road events

Athlete	Event	Heats		Final	
Athlete	Event	Result	Rank	Result	Rank
Vladislav Grigoryev	200 m	22.40	19 qC	22.83	16

Field Events

Athlete	Event	Qualification		Final	
Athlete	Event	Distance	Rank	Distance	Rank
Ivan Solovyev	Triple jump	15.31 PB	7 Q	14.96	6

Girls
Track & road events

Athlete	Event	Heats		Final	
Athlete	Event	Result	Rank	Result	Rank
Lyubov Ushakova	400 m	56.30 PB	13 qB	55.43 PB	5
Anastasiya Sergeyeva	400 m hurdles	1:02.95 PB	14	1:02.66 PB	6

Field events

Athlete	Event	Qualification		Final	
Athlete	Event	Distance	Rank	Distance	Rank
Yekaterina Nesterova	Shot put	14.68 PB	13 qB	14.68 PB	3
Varvara Nazarova	Javelin throw	44.65	14 qB	46.20	4

== Beach Volleyball ==
Kazakhstan qualified a boys' and girls' team by their performance at the AVC Qualification Tournament.

Athletes	Event	Preliminary round	Standing	Round of 24	Round of 16	Quarterfinals	Semifinals	Final / BM	Rank
Athletes	Event	Opposition Score	Standing	Opposition Score	Opposition Score	Opposition Score	Opposition Score	Opposition Score	Rank
Yegor Dmitriyev; Sergey Polichshuk	Boys'	Akande/Morris (NGR); W w/o	3 Q	Bogarin/Frutos (PAR); L 1 - 2	Did not advance				25
Yegor Dmitriyev; Sergey Polichshuk	Boys'	Al Hammadi/Al Sahi (OMA); W 2 – 0	3 Q	Bogarin/Frutos (PAR); L 1 - 2	Did not advance				25
Yegor Dmitriyev; Sergey Polichshuk	Boys'	Fraser/Welcome (VIN); W 2 – 1	3 Q	Bogarin/Frutos (PAR); L 1 - 2	Did not advance				25
Yegor Dmitriyev; Sergey Polichshuk	Boys'	Määttänen/Sirén (FIN); L 0 – 2	3 Q	Bogarin/Frutos (PAR); L 1 - 2	Did not advance				25
Yegor Dmitriyev; Sergey Polichshuk	Boys'	Lucarelli/Vieyto (URU); L 0 – 2	3 Q	Bogarin/Frutos (PAR); L 1 - 2	Did not advance				25
Yekaterina Lassyuta; Anna Pimenova	Girls'	Graudina – Kravcenoka (LAT); L 0-2 (12-21, 8-21)		Did not advance					
Yekaterina Lassyuta; Anna Pimenova	Girls'	Ocampo – Pacheco (ECU)		Did not advance					
Yekaterina Lassyuta; Anna Pimenova	Girls'	Enzo – Lantignotti (ITA)		Did not advance					
Yekaterina Lassyuta; Anna Pimenova	Girls'	McNamara – McNamara (CAN)		Did not advance					
Yekaterina Lassyuta; Anna Pimenova	Girls'	Palmhert – Seebach (NAM)		Did not advance					

== Boxing ==
Kazakhstan qualified four boxers based on its performance at the 2014 AIBA Youth World Championships

Boys

Athlete	Event	Preliminaries	Semifinals	Final / RM	Rank
Athlete	Event	Opposition Result	Opposition Result	Opposition Result	Rank
Shalkar Aikhynbay	-49 kg	Karakılıç (TUR); W 3-0	Huseynov (AZE); L 1-2	Bronze Medal Bout Murata (JPN); L 1-2	4
Ablaikhan Zhussupov	-60 kg	Mustafa (ROU); W 3-0	Könnyű (HUN); W 3-0	Limonta (CUB); W 2-1	1st place, gold medalist(s)
Vadim Kazakov	-81 kg	Tregren (NOR); W 3-0	Manasyan (ARM); W 2-1	Naydenov (BUL); L 0-3	2nd place, silver medalist(s)

Girls

Athlete	Event	Preliminaries	Semifinals	Final / RM	Rank
Athlete	Event	Opposition Result	Opposition Result	Opposition Result	Rank
Alua Balkibekova	-51 kg	Grigoryan (ARM); L 0–3	Did not advance	Bout for 5th Place Huang (TPE); W 2–0	5

== Canoeing ==
Kazakhstan qualified two boats based on its performance at the 2013 World Junior Canoe Sprint and Slalom Championships.

Boys

Athlete	Event	Qualification		Round of 16		Quarterfinals	Semifinals	Final / BM	Rank
Athlete	Event	Time	Rank	Time	Rank	Opposition Result	Opposition Result	Opposition Result	Rank
Anton Alshanskiy	C1 slalom	DNF		Did not advance					
Anton Alshanskiy	C1 sprint	1:58.994	10 Q	1:58.554	9	Did not advance			9

Girls

Athlete	Event	Qualification		Repechage		Round of 16		Quarterfinals	Semifinals	Final / BM	Rank
Athlete	Event	Time	Rank	Time	Rank	Time	Rank	Opposition Result	Opposition Result	Opposition Result	Rank
Yekaterina Kaletenberger	K1 slalom	DNS		Did not advance							
Yekaterina Kaletenberger	K1 sprint	1:48.724	4 Q	—N/a		1:48.737	3 Q	Hutton (RSA); W 1:46.583	Nikitina (RUS); L 1:47.236	Morison Rey (ESP); L DNF	4

== Cycling ==
Kazakhstan qualified a boys' and girls' team based on its ranking issued by the UCI.

Team

Athletes	Event	Cross-Country Eliminator		Time Trial			BMX		Cross-Country Race			Road Race			Total Pts	Rank
Athletes	Event	Rank	Points	Time	Rank	Points	Rank	Points	Time	Rank	Points	Time	Rank	Points	Total Pts	Rank
Grigoriy Shtein; Nurgali Turebekov	Boys' Team	18	0	5:21.01	14	3	11	16	-2 LAP	22	0	1:37:29; 1:37:23	28; 21	0	19	22
Tatyana Geneleva; Viktoriya Pastarnak	Girls' Team	22	0	6:31.18	22	0	17	0	50:57	18	0	1:12:36; 1:12:36	31; 20	0	0	29

Mixed Relay

Athletes	Event	Cross-Country Girls' Race	Cross-Country Boys' Race	Boys' Road Race	Girls' Road Race	Total Time	Rank
Tatyana Geneleva; Nurgali Turebekov; Grigoriy Shtein; Viktoriya Pastarnak	Mixed Team Relay					18:02	5

== Fencing ==
Kazakhstan qualified one athlete based on its performance at the 2014 FIE Cadet World Championships.

Boys

Athlete	Event	Pool Round	Seed	Round of 16	Quarterfinals	Semifinals	Final / BM	Rank
Athlete	Event	Opposition Score	Seed	Opposition Score	Opposition Score	Opposition Score	Opposition Score	Rank
Nurlan Kassymov	Sabre	P di Martino (ARG); W 5-3; N Shengelia (GEO); W 5-2; Muhammad (BRU); W 5-3; Ferjani (TUN); L 3-5; M Giakoumatos (GRE); L 4-5; K Metryka (USA); W 5-3	3 Q	Al-Musawi (IRQ); W 15-10	Ferjani (TUN); L 12-15	Did not advance		6

Mixed Team

Athletes	Event	Round of 16	Quarterfinals	Semifinals / PM	Final / PM	Rank
Athletes	Event	Opposition Score	Opposition Score	Opposition Score	Opposition Score	Rank
	Mixed Team					

== Gymnastics ==
=== Artistic Gymnastics ===
Kazakhstan qualified two athletes based on its performance at the 2014 Asian Artistic Gymnastics Championships.

Boys

Athlete	Event	Apparatus						Total	Rank
Athlete	Event	F	PH	R	V	PB	HB	Total	Rank
Yerbol Jantykov	Qualification	13.100 20	12.250 23	12.950 17	14.600 37	13.700 10	13.150 22	76.750	17 Q
Yerbol Jantykov	All-Around	13.400	12.600	13.050	13.050	13.300	9.900	75.000	15

Girls

Athlete	Event	Apparatus				Total	Rank
Athlete	Event	V	UB	BB	F	Total	Rank
Arailym Khanseitova	Qualification	12.400 36	10.700 21	12.400 16	11.950 20	47.450	24

=== Rhythmic Gymnastics ===
Kazakhstan qualified one individual and one team based on its performance at the 2014 Asian Rhythmic Championships.

Individual

Athlete	Event	Qualification						Final					
Athlete	Event	Hoop	Ball	Clubs	Ribbon	Total	Rank	Hoop	Ball	Clubs	Ribbon	Total	Rank
Yelizaveta Mainovskaya	Individual	12.025	12.375	11.000	12.950	48.350	13	Did not advance					

Team

Athletes	Event	Qualification				Final			
Athletes	Event	4 Hoops	4 Ribbons	Total	Rank	4 Hoops	4 Ribbons	Total	Rank
Viktoriya Guslyakova; Amina Kozhakhat; Nuray Kumarova; Darya Medvedeva; Aliya Moldakhmetova	Team	11.300	12.000	23.300	4 Q	12.300	12.750	25.050	3rd place, bronze medalist(s)

=== Trampoline ===
Kazakhstan qualified one athlete based on its performance at the 2014 Asian Trampoline Championships.

Athlete	Event	Qualification				Final	
Athlete	Event	Routine 1	Routine 2	Total	Rank	Score	Rank
Pirmammad Aliyev	Boys	43.950 7	54.980 3	98.930	3 Q	5.775	7

== Judo ==
Kazakhstan qualified two athletes based on its performance at the 2013 Cadet World Judo Championships.

Individual

Athlete	Event	Quarterfinals	Semifinals	Rep 1	Rep 2	Final / BM	Rank
Athlete	Event	Opposition Result	Opposition Result	Opposition Result	Opposition Result	Opposition Result	Rank
Bauyrzhan Zhauyntayev	Boys' -55 kg	Bye	Karaca (TUR); W 001-000	—N/a		Gurbanli (AZE); W 001-000	1st place, gold medalist(s)
Adiya Saiyn	Girls' -44 kg	Aliyeva (AZE); L 000-101	Did not advance	Bye	Soriano (DOM); L 000-100	Did not advance	6

Team

Athletes	Event	Round of 16	Quarterfinals	Semifinals	Final	Rank
Athletes	Event	Opposition Result	Opposition Result	Opposition Result	Opposition Result	Rank
Team Kerr; Sophie Berger (BEL); Karla Lorenzana (GUA); Saliou Ndiaye (SEN); Jennifer Schwille (GER); Oussama Snoussi (TUN); Pawel Wawrzyczek (POL); Bauyrzhan Zhauyntayev (KAZ)	Mixed Team	Team Berghmans; L 2-4	Did not advance			9

== Modern Pentathlon ==
Kazakhstan qualified one athlete based on its performance at the Asian and Oceania YOG Qualifiers and another based on the 1 June 2014 Olympic Youth A Pentathlon World Rankings.

Athlete	Event	Fencing Ranking Round (épée one touch)		Swimming (200 m freestyle)			Fencing Final Round (épée one touch)			Combined: Shooting/Running (10 m air pistol)/(3000 m)			Total Points	Final Rank
Athlete	Event	Results	Rank	Time	Rank	Points	Results	Rank	Points	Time	Rank	Points	Total Points	Final Rank
Artem Drobotov	Boys' Individual		6											
Olessya Mylnikova	Girls' Individual													
Unknown; Artem Drobotov (KAZ)	Mixed Relay													
Olessya Mylnikova (KAZ); Unknown	Mixed Relay													

== Shooting ==
Kazakhstan was given a wild card to compete.

Individual

Athlete	Event	Qualification		Final	
Athlete	Event	Points	Rank	Points	Rank
Sukhrab Turdyyev	Boys' 10m Air Pistol	570	7 Q	76.7	8

Team

Athletes	Event	Qualification		Round of 16	Quarterfinals	Semifinals	Final / BM	Rank
Athletes	Event	Points	Rank	Opposition Result	Opposition Result	Opposition Result	Opposition Result	Rank
Sukhrab Turdyyev (KAZ); Tereza Pribanova (CZE)	Mixed Team 10m Air Pistol							

== Swimming ==
Kazakhstan qualified three swimmers.

Boys

Athlete	Event	Heat		Semifinal		Final	
Athlete	Event	Time	Rank	Time	Rank	Time	Rank
Dmitriy Goverdovskiy	50 m breaststroke	29.21	20	Did not advance			
Dmitriy Goverdovskiy	100 m breaststroke	1:05.02	29	Did not advance			

Girls

Athlete	Event	Heat		Semifinal		Final	
Athlete	Event	Time	Rank	Time	Rank	Time	Rank
Yekaterina Russova	50 m freestyle	26.78	21	Did not advance			
Yekaterina Dymchenko	50 m backstroke	30.04	22	Did not advance			
Yekaterina Dymchenko	100 m backstroke	1:04.23	20	Did not advance			

== Table Tennis ==
Kazakhstan qualified a male athlete based on its performance at the Road to Nanjing series. Later Kazakhstan qualified a female athlete based on its performance at the Asian Qualification Event.

Singles

Athlete	Event	Group Stage	Rank	Round of 16	Quarterfinals	Semifinals	Final / BM	Rank
Athlete	Event	Opposition Score	Rank	Opposition Score	Opposition Score	Opposition Score	Opposition Score	Rank
Kirill Gerassimenko	Boys	Group G Avvari (USA); W 3 - 0	Q	Fan (CHN); L 1 - 4	Did not advance			16
Kirill Gerassimenko	Boys	Akkuzu (FRA)	Q	Fan (CHN); L 1 - 4	Did not advance			16
Kirill Gerassimenko	Boys	Yadav (IND); W 3 - 1	Q	Fan (CHN); L 1 - 4	Did not advance			16
Yuliya Ryabova	Girls	Group G Wan (GER); L 1 - 3	qB	Imre (HUN); L 0 - 3	Did not advance			25
Yuliya Ryabova	Girls	Lorenzotti (URU)	qB	Imre (HUN); L 0 - 3	Did not advance			25
Yuliya Ryabova	Girls	Diaconu (ROU); L 1 - 3	qB	Imre (HUN); L 0 - 3	Did not advance			25

Team

Athletes	Event	Group Stage	Rank	Round of 16	Quarterfinals	Semifinals	Final / BM	Rank
Athletes	Event	Opposition Score	Rank	Opposition Score	Opposition Score	Opposition Score	Opposition Score	Rank
Kazakhstan; Yuliya Ryabova (KAZ); Kirill Gerassimenko (KAZ)	Mixed	South Korea; Park (KOR); Kim (KOR); L	qB	Singapore; Yee (SIN); Yin (SIN) 'L 0-2	Did not advance			
Kazakhstan; Yuliya Ryabova (KAZ); Kirill Gerassimenko (KAZ)	Mixed	Egypt; Saad (EGY); Ghallab (EGY); L	qB	Singapore; Yee (SIN); Yin (SIN) 'L 0-2	Did not advance			
Kazakhstan; Yuliya Ryabova (KAZ); Kirill Gerassimenko (KAZ)	Mixed	France; Zarif (FRA); Akkuzu (FRA); L	qB	Singapore; Yee (SIN); Yin (SIN) 'L 0-2	Did not advance			

Qualification Legend: Q=Main Bracket (medal); qB=Consolation Bracket (non-medal)

== Taekwondo ==
Kazakhstan qualified one athlete based on its performance at the Taekwondo Qualification Tournament.

Boys

Athlete	Event	Round of 16	Quarterfinals	Semifinals	Final	Rank
Athlete	Event	Opposition Result	Opposition Result	Opposition Result	Opposition Result	Rank
Galymzhan Serikbay	−48 kg	Patti (NED); W 9 - 8	Wang (TPE); L 5 - 19 (PTG)	Did not advance		5

== Triathlon ==
Kazakhstan qualified one athlete based on its performance at the 2014 Asian Youth Olympic Games Qualifier.

Individual

Athlete	Event	Swim (750m)	Trans 1	Bike (20km)	Trans 2	Run (5km)	Total Time	Rank
Arman Kydyrtayev	Boys	10:56	00:45	34:36	00:25	18:39	1:05:21	31

Relay

Athlete	Event	Total Times per Athlete (Swim 250m, Bike 6.6km, Run 1.8km)	Total Group Time	Rank
Asia 3 Cheuk Yi Hung (HKG); Yin-Cheng Chi (TPE); Victorija Deldio (PHI); Arman Kydyrtayev (KAZ)	Mixed Relay	23:29; 22:07; 25:15; 22:20	1:33:11	15

== Weightlifting ==
Kazakhstan qualified 2 quotas in the boys' events and 2 quotas in the girls' events based on the team ranking after the 2013 Weightlifting Youth World Championships.

Boys

Athlete	Event	Snatch		Clean & jerk		Total	Rank
Athlete	Event	Result	Rank	Result	Rank	Total	Rank
Mikhail Makeyev	−69 kg	125	4	153	4	278	4
Zhaslan Kaliyev	-77 kg	139	3	171	3	310	3rd place, bronze medalist(s)

Girls

Athlete	Event	Snatch		Clean & jerk		Total	Rank
Athlete	Event	Result	Rank	Result	Rank	Total	Rank
Altynay Damen	−58 kg	68	6	93	4	161	5
Tatyana Kapustina	+63 kg	105	2	123	4	228	3rd place, bronze medalist(s)

== Wrestling ==
Kazakhstan qualified four athletes based on its performance at the 2014 Asian Cadet Championships.

Key:
- VT - Victory by Fall.
- PP - Decision by Points - the loser with technical points.
- PO - Decision by Points - the loser without technical points.

Boys

Athlete	Event	Group stage					Final / RM	Rank
Athlete	Event	Opposition Score	Opposition Score	Opposition Score	Opposition Score	Rank	Opposition Score	Rank
Mukhambet Kuatbek	Freestyle -54kg	Guvazhokov (RUS); W 3-1	Aular (VEN); W	Corbett (NZL); W	Matevosyan (ARM); W	1 Q	Fix (USA); W 3-1 ^{PP}	1st place, gold medalist(s)
Raiymbek Kurnalaly	Greco-Roman -58kg	Abdevali (RUS); L 1-3	Downes (NZL); W	Abdevali (IRI); L 2-4	—N/a	3 Q	Nasr (TUN); W 4-0 ^{ST}	5
Yevgeny Polivadov	Greco-Roman -69kg	Ibrahim (EGY); W 4-0 ^{ST}	Dadov (AZE); L 0-3 ^{PO}	Alimov (UZB); W 3-0 ^{PO}	—N/a	2 Q	Mosebach (GER); W 3-1 ^{PP}	3rd place, bronze medalist(s)

Girls

Athlete	Event	Group stage				Final / RM	Rank
Athlete	Event	Opposition Score	Opposition Score	Opposition Score	Rank	Opposition Score	Rank
Merey Duisenova	Freestyle -70kg	Strzalka (POL); L	Shisterova (RUS); L 0 - 4	Ayovi (ECU); L	4 Q	Youin (CIV); W 3 - 1	7
