= Kellie Gibson =

Australian rules footballer (born 1996)

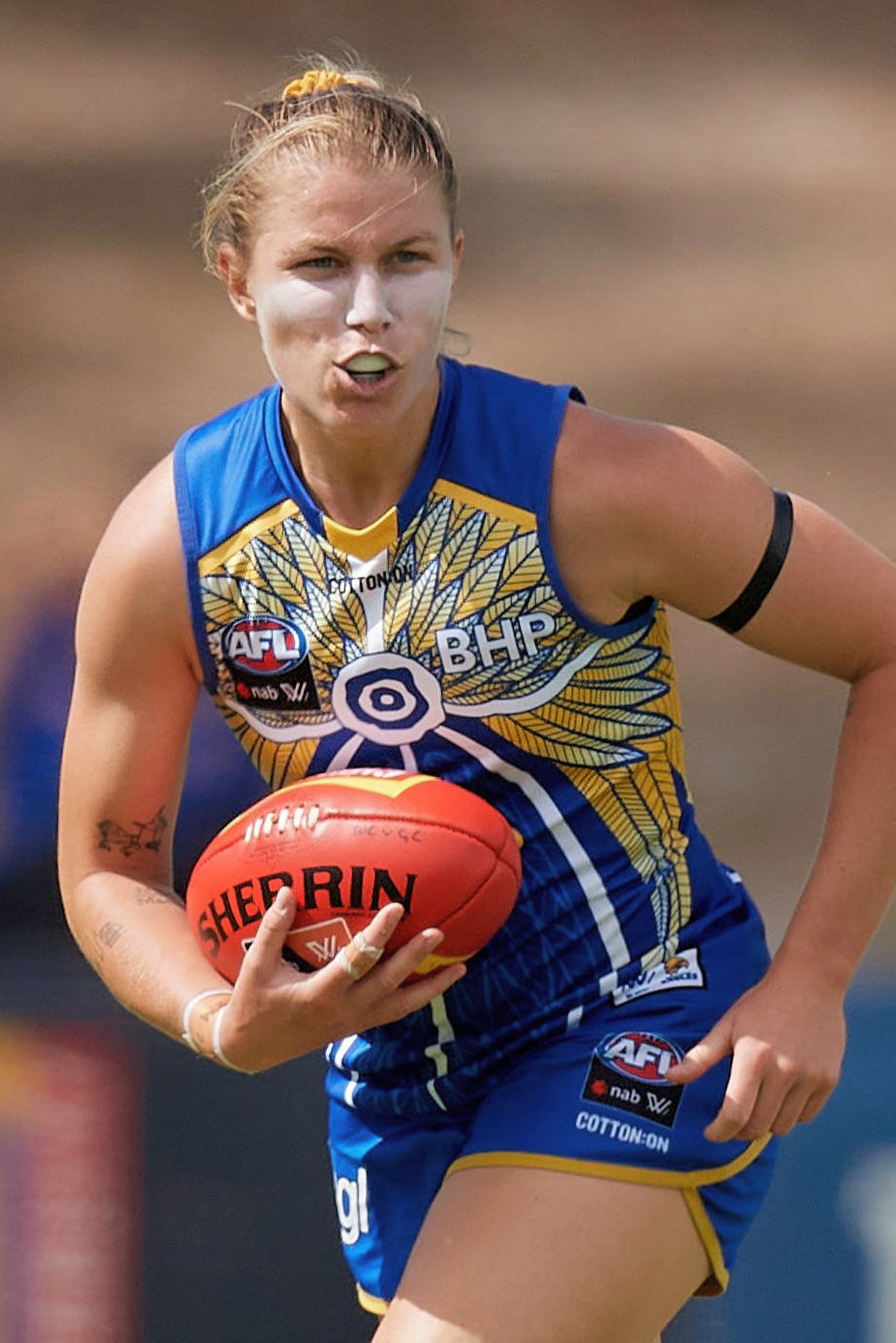
- Gibson playing for West Coast in 2022

Personal information
- Born: 9 June 1996 (age 30)
- Original team: Swan Districts (WAWFL)
- Draft: 2016 marquee signing
- Debut: Round 1, 2017, Adelaide vs. Greater Western Sydney, at Thebarton Oval
- Height: 170 cm (5 ft 7 in)
- Position: Midfielder / forward

Club information
- Current club: West Coast
- Number: 2

Playing career^{1}
Years	Club	Games (Goals)
2017	Adelaide	8 (4)
2018–2019	Fremantle	8 (8)
2020–	West Coast	48 (27)
Total		64 (39)
- ^{1} Playing statistics correct to the end of Round 5, 2025.

Career highlights
- AFL Women's premiership player: 2017; 2× West Coast leading goalkicker: 2023, 2024

Medal record

Women's rugby sevens

Representing Australia

Youth Olympic Games
Gold medal – first place	2014 Nanjing	Team competition

Kellie-Maree Gibson (born 9 June 1996) is an Australian rules footballer playing for West Coast in the AFL Women's competition. She was one of Adelaide's two marquee players in the inaugural AFL Women's season and has also played for Fremantle. A multi-sport athlete, Gibson began her athletic career as a sprinter, and won a gold medal in rugby sevens at the 2014 Summer Youth Olympics.

== Early life and junior career ==
Gibson was an accomplished junior footballer, representing Western Australia five times at Under-18s level and being named a two-time All-Australian. She was part of two WAWFL premiership teams, winning best-on-ground honors for the Black Ducks in the 2013 grand final and was also a member of the Swan Districts 2015 WAWFL premiership team. Gibson was selected to play in the first AFL-sanctioned women's exhibition match in 2013, when she was barely 17. Over the following years, she played women's AFL exhibition games for both the Western Bulldogs and Melbourne Football Club.

== AFL Women's career ==
Gibson was one of two marquee player signings announced by Adelaide in July 2016, in anticipation of the 2017 AFL Women's season. After playing in all seven regular season games and the 2017 AFL Women's Grand Final with the premiership-winning team, Gibson expressed a desire to return to Western Australia. Unable to negotiate a trade with Fremantle, Adelaide delisted her in May 2017. At the start of the free agency period, Fremantle signed Gibson for the 2018 AFL Women's season.

Gibson sustained a hip flexor injury in a practice match before the beginning of the 2018 AFL Women's season. An initial diagnosis suggested a six-to-eight week recovery time. She made her debut for Fremantle in the final round of the 2018 season, kicking a goal as Fremantle defeated Carlton at Fremantle Oval.

In April 2019, Gibson joined cross-town rivals West Coast for their inaugural season. It was revealed Gibson signed on with West Coast on 25 June 2021.

After managing 8 games in season 6 of 2022, Gibson suffered a season-ending ACL injury in the opening round of season 7.

Gibson made her return from injury in the opening round of the 2023 AFL Women's season. She went on to play every game that season, finishing as West Coast's leading goalkicker and setting a new club record and career-best tally for goals kicked, with 12 goals. She signed a long-term contract extension in December to stay with the Eagles until 2026.

Gibson was again West Coast's leading goalkicker for the 2024 AFL Women's season, kicking 8 goals from 10 games.

== Statistics ==
Statistics are correct to the end of Round 5, 2025.

Legend
G	Goals	K	Kicks	D	Disposals	T	Tackles
B	Behinds	H	Handballs	M	Marks

Season	Team	No.	Games	Totals							Averages (per game)							Votes
Season	Team	No.	Games	G	B	K	H	D	M	T	G	B	K	H	D	M	T	Votes
2017	Adelaide	2	8	4	2	38	16	54	9	11	0.5	0.3	4.8	2.0	6.8	1.1	1.4	0
2018	Fremantle	21	1	1	1	9	2	11	1	1	1.0	1.0	9.0	2.0	11.0	1.0	1.0	0
2019	Fremantle	21	7	7	1	34	12	46	6	11	1.0	0.1	4.9	1.7	6.6	0.9	1.6	0
2020	West Coast	2	6	0	2	34	7	41	11	15	0.0	0.3	5.7	1.2	6.8	1.8	2.5	0
2021	West Coast	2	9	0	4	52	28	80	8	30	0.0	0.4	5.8	3.1	8.9	0.9	3.3	0
2022(S6)	West Coast	2	8	4	1	45	12	57	16	24	0.5	0.1	5.6	1.5	7.1	2.0	3.0	0
2022(S7)	West Coast	2	1	1	0	2	0	2	1	0	1.0	0.0	2.0	0.0	2.0	1.0	0.0	0
2023	West Coast	2	10	12	5	53	27	80	18	26	1.2	0.5	5.3	2.7	8.0	1.8	2.6	0
2024	West Coast	2	10	8	1	55	18	73	20	29	0.8	0.1	5.5	1.8	7.3	2.0	2.9	1
2025	West Coast	2	4	2	1	24	12	36	7	21	0.5	0.3	6.0	3.0	9.0	1.8	5.3	0
Career			64	39	18	346	134	480	97	168	0.6	0.3	5.4	2.1	7.5	1.5	2.6	1

== Personal life ==
Prior to being selected by Adelaide as a marquee player, Gibson moved from Perth to Adelaide in June 2016 to work for the South Australian National Football League (SANFL) as female engagement coordinator.
