= Fiji at the 2014 Summer Youth Olympics =

- IOC code: FIJ
- NOC: Fiji Association of Sports and National Olympic Committee

in Nanjing
- Competitors: 26 in 5 sports
- Medals Ranked 80th: Gold 0 Silver 0 Bronze 1 Total 1

Summer Youth Olympics appearances
- 2010; 2014; 2018; 2026

Fiji competed at the 2014 Summer Youth Olympics, in Nanjing, China from 16 August to 28 August 2014.

== Medalists ==
Medal	Name	Sport	Event	Date
Bronze	Fiji boys' national rugby sevens team: Josaia Cokaibusa; Waisea Daroko; Timoci Meya; Ratu Nawabalavu; Sailasa Powell; Alipate Qaraniqio; Filipe Qoro; Navitalai Ralawa; Joseva Rauga; Semi Tabacule; Ratu Uluiviti; Eminoni Vuidravuwalu	Rugby Sevens	Boys' Tournament	20 August

== Athletics ==
Fiji qualified two athletes.

Qualification Legend: Q=Final A (medal); qB=Final B (non-medal); qC=Final C (non-medal); qD=Final D (non-medal); qE=Final E (non-medal)

Boys
Track & road events

Athlete	Event	Heats		Final	
Athlete	Event	Result	Rank	Result	Rank
Keasi Naidroka	100 m	11.23	15 qB	11.44	17

Girls
Track & road events

Athlete	Event	Heats		Final	
Athlete	Event	Result	Rank	Result	Rank
Kayla Yee	100 m	DNF qD		DNS	

== Field hockey ==
Fiji qualified a girls' team based on its performance at the Oceania Qualification Tournament.

=== Girls' tournament ===
Roster

- Taraivini Bennion
- Lora Bukalidi
- Tiara Dutta
- Adi Naselesele
- Ro Ratumaimuri
- Lala Ravatu
- Ro Silatolu
- Temo Tikoitoga
- Ateca Tinaisalasalavonu

Group Stage

Pos	Team	Pld	W	D	L	GF	GA	GD	Pts	Qualification
1	Netherlands	4	4	0	0	46	1	+45	12	Quarterfinals
2	Japan	4	2	1	1	42	16	+26	7	Quarterfinals
3	Argentina	4	2	1	1	34	9	+25	7	Quarterfinals
4	South Africa	4	1	0	3	8	34	−26	3	Quarterfinals
5	Fiji	4	0	0	4	3	73	−70	0	

Source: FIH
Rules for classification: 1) points; 2) goal difference; 3) goals scored; 4) head-to-head result.

17 August 2014
16:30

Argentina	22–0	Fiji
Jankunas 1', 3', 15', 15', 27', 28', 31', 34'; Trinchinetti 6', 16', 17', 36'; Ortiz 7', 33'; Retegui 10', 21', 32'; Guastavino 19', 23', 30'; Toccalino 26', 35'	Report

Umpires:
Ivona Makar (CRO)
Tanja Schafer (RSA)

18 August 2014
16:00

Netherlands	17–0	Fiji
Jankunas 3', 22'; Toccalino 4', 27'; Gustavino 8', 15'; Trinchinetti 20'; Retegui 24', 26'	Report

Umpires:
Ana Faias (POR)
Lucy Townend (NZL)

19 August 2014
19:30

South Africa	8–2	Fiji
Harmse 1', 13'; Marais 2', 18'; Paton 11', 22'; Raubenheimer 19'; Haupt 33'	Report	Bennion 20'; Ravatu 29'

Umpires:
Lucy Townend (NZL)
Ana Faias (POR)

20 August 2014
18:00

Fiji	1–26	Japan
Bennion 36'	Report	Asai 1', 7', 25', 34'; Kawamura 1', 3', 14', 15', 20', 28'; Mori 4', 11', 16', 19', 30', 31', 33'; Fujibayashi 5', 29', 32'; Kozuka 8', 10', 35', 36'; Karino 11', 18'

Umpires:
Ivona Makar (CRO)
Lucy Townend (NZL)

Ninth and tenth place

24 August 2014
16:00

Fiji	1–6	Zambia
Dutta 22'	Report	Mudenda 7', 29', 32'; Mambwe 9'; Phiri 27'; Nankala 34'

Umpires:
Emily Carroll (AUS)
Toh Li Min (SIN)

== Rugby sevens ==
Fiji qualified a boys' team based on its performance at the 2013 Rugby World Cup Sevens.

=== Boys' tournament ===
Roster

- Josaia Cokaibusa
- Waisea Daroko
- Timoci Meya
- Ratu Nawabalavu
- Sailasa Powell
- Alipate Qaraniqio
- Filipe Qoro
- Navitalai Ralawa
- Joseva Rauga
- Semi Tabacule
- Ratu Uluiviti
- Eminoni Vuidravuwalu

Group Stage

Pos	Team	Pld	W	D	L	PF	PA	PD	Pts
1	Argentina	5	5	0	0	145	34	+111	15
2	France	5	4	0	1	98	55	+43	13
3	Fiji	5	2	0	3	82	70	+12	9
4	Kenya	5	2	0	3	68	107	−39	9
5	Japan	5	2	0	3	73	131	−58	9
6	United States	5	0	0	5	59	128	−69	5

17 August 2014
10:30

Fiji	29 - 5	Japan

Youth Olympic Sports Park

17 August 2014
17:30

Fiji	29 - 10	United States

Youth Olympic Sports Park

18 August 2014
10:30

Fiji	12 - 17	France

Youth Olympic Sports Park

18 August 2014
18:30

Fiji	0 - 21	Argentina

Youth Olympic Sports Park

19 August 2014
11:30

Fiji	12 - 17	Kenya

Youth Olympic Sports Park

Semifinal

19 August 2014
15:30

France	34 - 12	Fiji

Youth Olympic Sports Park

Bronze Medal Match

20 August 2014
09:00

Kenya	0 - 12	Fiji (bronze)

Youth Olympic Sports Park

== Swimming ==
Fiji qualified one swimmer.

Boys

Athlete	Event	Heat		Semifinal		Final	
Athlete	Event	Time	Rank	Time	Rank	Time	Rank
Meli Malani	50 m freestyle	23.76	21	did not advance			
Meli Malani	50 m breaststroke	29.59	25	did not advance			
Meli Malani	50 m butterfly	26.02	31	did not advance			

== Weightlifting ==
Fiji qualified 1 quota in the boys' and girls' events based on the team ranking after the 2014 Weightlifting Oceania Championships.

Boys

Athlete	Event	Snatch		Clean & jerk		Total	Rank
Athlete	Event	Result	Rank	Result	Rank	Total	Rank
Paoma Qaqa	−62 kg	98	8	113	8	211	8

Girls

Athlete	Event	Snatch		Clean & jerk		Total	Rank
Athlete	Event	Result	Rank	Result	Rank	Total	Rank
Ulina Sagone	−53 kg	58	7	68	8	126	7
