= Chad at the 2014 Summer Youth Olympics =

- IOC code: CHA
- NOC: Comité Olympique et Sportif Tchadien

in Nanjing
- Competitors: 2 in 1 sport

Summer Youth Olympics appearances
- 2010; 2014; 2018

Chad competed at the 2014 Summer Youth Olympics, in Nanjing, China from 16 August to 28 August 2014.

== Athletics ==
Chad qualified two athletes.

Qualification Legend: Q=Final A (medal); qB=Final B (non-medal); qC=Final C (non-medal); qD=Final D (non-medal); qE=Final E (non-medal)

Boys
Track & road events

Athlete	Event	Heats		Final	
Athlete	Event	Result	Rank	Result	Rank
Haroune Abraham	200 m	23.19	21 qC	DSQ	

Girls
Track & road events

Athlete	Event	Heats		Final	
Athlete	Event	Result	Rank	Result	Rank
Mazou Halme	100 m	13.59	24 qC	13.49	19
