= Canoeing at the 2014 Summer Youth Olympics =

Canoeing at the II Summer Youth Olympic Games
- Venue: Nanjing Rowing-Canoeing School
- Dates: 23–27 August
- Competitors: 64

Canoeing at the 2014 Summer Youth Olympics was held between August 23 to August 27. The events took place at the Nanjing Rowing-Canoeing School in Nanjing, China.

== Qualification ==
There were four events in sprint and slalom each (K1 and C1 for both genders). All athletes qualifying for an event must have competed in the same event in the other discipline (slalom or sprint) or risk disqualification. There were two events: the 2013 Junior Sprint World Championships in Welland, Ontario and the 2013 Junior slalom championship in Liptovsky Mikulas, Slovakia were quotas were awarded. Every continent must have been represented in each event. A total of 64 athletes competed, including 10 spots reserved for universality (5 per gender) and 2 for the hosts.

=== Summary ===
Nation	Men		Women		Boats
Nation	C-1	K-1	C-1	K-1	Boats
Andorra				X	1
Australia		X			1
Austria			X	X	2
Belarus		X	X		2
Brazil			X	X	2
Canada		X	X		2
China		X		X	2
Cuba		X			1
Czech Republic	X	X	X	X	4
Denmark				X	1
Ecuador			X		1
France	X	X	X	X	4
Germany		X	X	X	3
Great Britain		X		X	2
Hungary	X	X		X	3
India			X		1
Ireland	X				1
Italy	X				1
Japan				X	1
Kazakhstan	X			X	2
South Korea	X				1
Kyrgyzstan		X			1
Lithuania	X				1
Mexico			X		1
Moldova	X				1
New Zealand				X	1
Norway				X	1
Poland	X	X		X	3
Portugal		X			1
Romania	X			X	2
Russia		X		X	2
São Tomé and Príncipe				X	1
Senegal	X	X			2
Serbia		X			1
Slovakia	X	X		X	3
Slovenia	X	X			2
South Africa				X	1
Spain			X	X	2
Ukraine	X		X		2
United States		X			1
Uzbekistan	X				1
Total: 41 NOCs	16	19	12	21	68

=== C-1 ===
Event	Location	Date	Total Places	Qualified Boys	Qualified Girls
2013 World Junior; Sprint Championships	(Canada) Welland	1–4 August 2013	8/4	Hungary; Italy; Kazakhstan; Lithuania; Moldova; Poland; Romania; Ukraine	Belarus; Canada; Ecuador; Ukraine
2013 World Junior; Slalom Championships	(Slovakia) Liptovský Mikuláš	17–21 July 2013	5	Czech Republic; France; Ireland; Slovenia; Slovakia	Austria; Brazil; Czech Republic; France; Germany
Reallocation	-	-	3/2	South Korea; Senegal; Uzbekistan	India; Mexico
Athletes from K1	-	-	0/1		Spain
TOTAL				16	12

=== K-1 ===
Event	Location	Date	Total Places	Qualified Boys	Qualified Girls
Host Nation	-	-	1	China	China
2013 World Junior; Sprint Championships	(Canada) Welland	1–4 August 2013	9	Belarus; Canada; Cuba; Germany; Hungary; Poland; Portugal; Russia; Serbia	Denmark; Hungary; Japan; Kazakhstan; New Zealand; Norway; Romania; Russia; Spain
2013 World Junior; Slalom Championships	(Slovakia) Liptovský Mikuláš	17–21 July 2013	6	Australia; Czech Republic; France; Great Britain; Slovakia; Slovenia	Czech Republic; France; Germany; Great Britain; Poland; Slovakia
Tripartite Invitation	-	-	0/2		Andorra; São Tomé and Príncipe
Reallocation	-	-	2/1	Kyrgyzstan; United States	South Africa
Athletes from C1	-	-	1/2	Senegal	Austria; Brazil
TOTAL				19	21

== Schedule ==
The schedule was released by the Nanjing Youth Olympic Games Organizing Committee.

All times are CST (UTC+8)

Event date	Event day	Starting time	Event details
August 23	Saturday	09:00	Girls' C1 Sprint: Heats; Boys' C1 Sprint: Heats; Girls' K1 Sprint: Heats; Boys' K1 Sprint: Heats
August 23	Saturday	15:00	Girls' C1 Sprint: Repechage; Boys' C1 Sprint: Repechage; Girls' K1 Sprint: Repechage; Boys' K1 Sprint: Repechage; Girls' C1 Sprint: Round of 16; Boys' C1 Sprint: Round of 16; Girls' K1 Sprint: Round of 16; Boys' K1 Sprint: Round of 16; Girls' C1 Sprint: Quarterfinals; Boys' C1 Sprint: Quarterfinals; Girls' K1 Sprint: Quarterfinals; Boys' K1 Sprint: Quarterfinals
August 24	Sunday	15:00	Girls' C1 Sprint: Semifinals; Boys' C1 Sprint: Semifinals; Girls' K1 Sprint: Semifinals; Boys' K1 Sprint: Semifinals; Girls' C1 Sprint: Medal Matches; Boys' C1 Sprint: Medal Matches; Girls' K1 Sprint: Medal Matches; Boys' K1 Sprint: Medal Matches
August 26	Tuesday	09:00	Girls' C1 Slalom: Heats; Boys' C1 Slalom: Heats; Girls' K1 Slalom: Heats; Boys' K1 Slalom: Heats
August 26	Tuesday	15:00	Girls' C1 Slalom: Repechage; Boys' C1 Slalom: Repechage; Girls' K1 Slalom: Repechage; Boys' K1 Slalom: Repechage; Girls' C1 Slalom: Round of 16; Boys' C1 Slalom: Round of 16; Girls' K1 Slalom: Round of 16; Boys' K1 Slalom: Round of 16; Girls' C1 Slalom: Quarterfinals; Boys' C1 Slalom: Quarterfinals; Girls' K1 Slalom: Quarterfinals; Boys' K1 Slalom: Quarterfinals
August 27	Wednesday	15:00	Girls' C1 Slalom: Semifinals; Boys' C1 Slalom: Semifinals; Girls' K1 Slalom: Semifinals; Boys' K1 Slalom: Semifinals; Girls' C1 Slalom: Medal Matches; Boys' C1 Slalom: Medal Matches; Girls' K1 Slalom: Medal Matches; Boys' K1 Slalom: Medal Matches

== Medal summary ==
=== Boys' Events ===
Games	Gold	Silver	Bronze
Head-to-head Sprint C1	Serghei Tarnovschi; Moldova	Vadim Korobov; Lithuania	Kryštof Hájek; Czech Republic
Head-to-head Sprint K1	Stanislau Daineka; Belarus	Milán Mozgi; Hungary	Vladislav Oleynikov; Russia
Obstacle Canoe Slalom C1	Lucas Roisin; France	Robert Hendrick; Ireland	Marko Mirgorodský; Slovakia
Obstacle Canoe Slalom K1	Anže Urankar; Slovenia	Jakub Grigar; Slovakia	Huang Song; China

=== Girls' Events ===
Games	Gold	Silver	Bronze
Head-to-head Sprint C1	Kamila Bobr; Belarus	Liudmyla Luzan; Ukraine	Victoria Morales Cazarez; Mexico
Head-to-head Sprint K1	Inna Nikitina; Russia	Luca Homonnai; Hungary	Camila Morison Rey; Spain
Obstacle Canoe Slalom K1	Camille Prigent; France	Yan Jiahua; China	Amálie Hilgertová; Czech Republic
Obstacle Canoe Slalom C1	Nadine Weratschnig; Austria	Martina Satková; Czech Republic	Birgit Ohmayer; Germany

=== Medal table ===
Rank	Nation	Gold	Silver	Bronze	Total
1	Belarus	2	0	0	2
1	France	2	0	0	2
3	Russia	1	0	1	2
4	Austria	1	0	0	1
4	Moldova	1	0	0	1
4	Slovenia	1	0	0	1
7	Hungary	0	2	0	2
8	Czech Republic	0	1	2	3
9	China	0	1	1	2
9	Slovakia	0	1	1	2
11	Ireland	0	1	0	1
11	Lithuania	0	1	0	1
11	Ukraine	0	1	0	1
14	Germany	0	0	1	1
14	Mexico	0	0	1	1
14	Spain	0	0	1	1
Totals (16 entries)		8	8	8	24
