= Swimming at the 2014 Summer Youth Olympics – Boys' 200 metre individual medley =

Boys' 200 metre individual medley at the 2014 Summer Youth Olympics
- Venue: Nanjing Olympic Sports Centre
- Dates: 18 August
- Competitors: 23 from 20 nations
- Winning time: 2:01.08

Medalists
gold medal	Benjámin Grátz	Hungary
silver medal	Povilas Strazdas	Lithuania
bronze medal	Norbert Szabó	Hungary

The boys' 200 metre individual medley event in swimming at the 2014 Summer Youth Olympics took place on 18 August at the Nanjing Olympic Sports Centre in Nanjing, China.

== Results ==
=== Heats ===
The heats were held at 10:00.

Rank	Heat	Lane	Name	Nationality	Time	Notes
1	2	5	Benjámin Grátz	Hungary	2:02.06	Q
2	2	4	Patrick Mulcare	United States	2:02.66	Q
3	3	5	Norbert Szabó	Hungary	2:02.95	Q
4	3	4	Povilas Strazdas	Lithuania	2:03.50	Q
5	3	6	Guillermo Sánchez	Spain	2:03.59	Q
6	3	7	Chris Reid	South Africa	2:04.19	Q
7	1	5	Sebastian Steffan	Austria	2:04.31	Q
8	3	2	Trần Duy Khôi	Vietnam	2:04.56	Q
9	1	4	Duncan Scott	Great Britain	2:04.98	
10	3	3	Nic Groenewald	Australia	2:05.12	
11	1	6	Koki Tsunefuka	Japan	2:05.36	
12	2	1	Matías López	Paraguay	2:06.06	NR
13	2	3	Guillaume Laure	France	2:06.13	
14	1	3	Gonzalo Carazo	Spain	2:06.24	
15	1	2	Kristinn Þórarinsson	Iceland	2:06.90	
16	1	7	Artyom Pukhnatiy	Uzbekistan	2:07.68	
17	2	2	Martyn Walton	Great Britain	2:08.75	
18	2	8	Sven Saemundsson	Croatia	2:08.97	
19	1	1	Luca Pfyffer	Switzerland	2:09.28	
20	2	7	Yeziel Morales	Puerto Rico	2:09.97	
	2	6	Giacomo Carini	Italy	DNS	
	3	1	Jacob Garrod	New Zealand	DNS	
	3	8	Javier Acevedo	Canada	DNS	

=== Final ===
The final was held at 19:10.

Rank	Lane	Name	Nationality	Time	Notes
1st place, gold medalist(s)	4	Benjámin Grátz	Hungary	2:01.08	
2nd place, silver medalist(s)	6	Povilas Strazdas	Lithuania	2:02.32	
3rd place, bronze medalist(s)	3	Norbert Szabó	Hungary	2:02.47	
4	5	Patrick Mulcare	United States	2:02.88	
5	2	Guillermo Sánchez	Spain	2:03.37	
6	8	Trần Duy Khôi	Vietnam	2:03.69	
7	7	Chris Reid	South Africa	2:04.43	
8	1	Sebastian Steffan	Austria	2:04.61	
