= Elisabet Escursell Valero =

Spanish cyclist (born 1996)

Elisabet Escursell
Personal information
- Full name: Elisabet Escursell Valero
- Born: 30 October 1996 (age 29) Terrassa, Spain

Cycling career
- Sport: Cycling
- Current team: Cantabria Deporte–Río Miera
- Discipline: Road
- Role: Rider

Amateur team
- 2017–2018: BZK Emakumeen Bira–Smurfit Kappa

Professional teams
- 2015–2016: Bizkaia–Durango
- 2019: Massi–Tactic
- 2020–: Río Miera–Cantabria Deporte

Elisabet Escursell Valero (born 30 October 1996) is a Spanish professional racing cyclist, who currently rides for UCI Women's Continental Team Cantabria Deporte–Río Miera.

== See also ==
- List of 2015 UCI Women's Teams and riders
