= Svetlana Shcherbakova =

Russian weightlifter (born 1998)

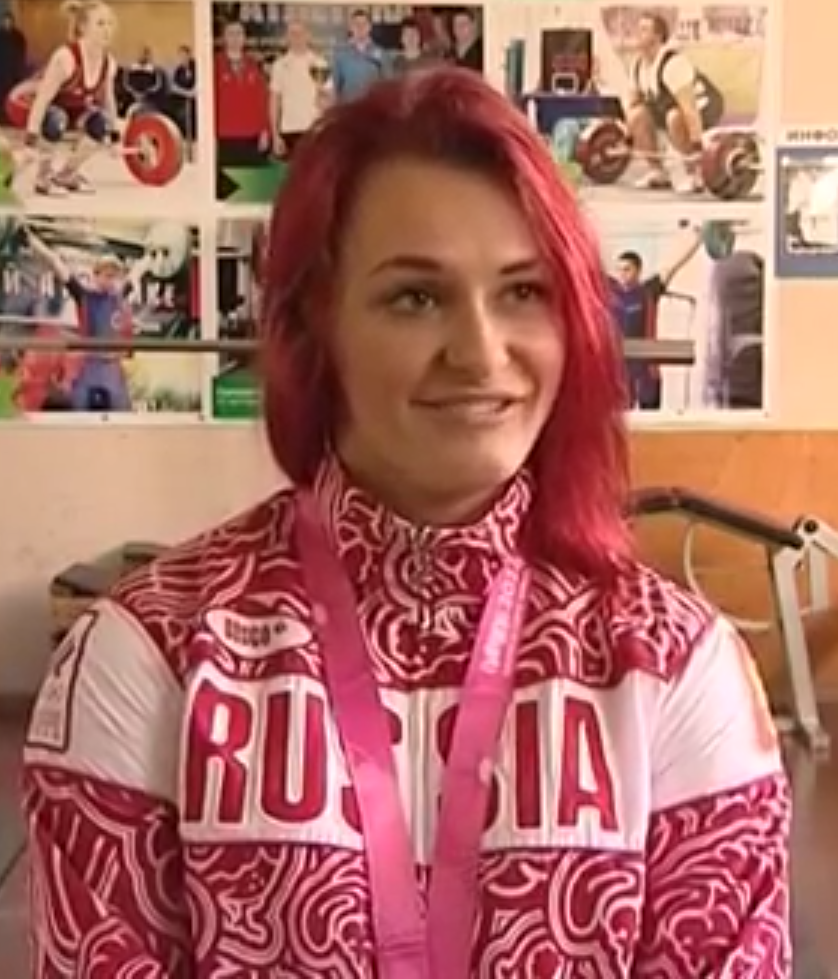
- Shcherbakova in 2014

Personal information
- Born: 4 August 1998 (age 28)
- Weight: 69.28 kg (152.7 lb)

Sport
- Country: Russia
- Sport: Weightlifting
- Weight class: +63 kg
- Team: National team
Medal record
Youth Olympic Games
Silver medal – second place	2014 Nanjing	+63 kg
- Updated on 9 November 2016

Svetlana Shcherbakova (born 4 August 1998) is a Russian weightlifter, who competed in the +63 kg category and represented Russia at international competitions.

She won the silver medal at the 2014 Summer Youth Olympics.

== Major results ==
Year	Venue	Weight	Snatch (kg)				Clean & Jerk (kg)				Total	Rank
Year	Venue	Weight	1	2	3	Rank	1	2	3	Rank	Total	Rank
Summer Youth Olympics
2014	Nanjing, China	+63 kg	96	100	103	---	121	125	~~133~~	---	228	2nd place, silver medalist(s)
