= Swimming at the 2014 Summer Youth Olympics – Boys' 200 metre butterfly =

Boys' 200 metre butterfly at the 2014 Summer Youth Olympics
- Venue: Nanjing Olympic Sports Centre
- Dates: 22 August
- Competitors: 22 from 21 nations
- Winning time: 1:55.95

Medalists
gold medal	Tamás Kenderesi	Hungary
silver medal	Benjámin Grátz	Hungary
bronze medal	Giacomo Carini	Italy

The boys' 200 metre butterfly event in swimming at the 2014 Summer Youth Olympics took place on 22 August at the Nanjing Olympic Sports Centre in Nanjing, China.

== Results ==
=== Heats ===
The heats were held at 10:26.

Rank	Heat	Lane	Name	Nationality	Time	Notes
1	3	3	Nils Liess	Switzerland	1:58.44	Q
2	3	4	Benjámin Grátz	Hungary	1:59.31	Q
3	1	4	Luiz Altamir Melo	Brazil	1:59.41	Q
4	1	5	Giacomo Carini	Italy	1:59.83	Q
5	2	4	Justin Wright	United States	2:00.04	Q
6	3	5	Tamás Kenderesi	Hungary	2:01.26	Q
7	2	3	Ahmed Akram	Egypt	2:01.46	Q
8	3	6	Jonathan Gómez	Colombia	2:01.94	Q
9	1	3	Nicholas Brown	Australia	2:02.28	
10	3	8	Ricardo Vargas	Mexico	2:03.28	
11	1	1	Huberto del Río	Cuba	2:03.41	
12	3	7	Supriya Mondal	India	2:03.71	
13	1	2	Chou Wei-liang	Chinese Taipei	2:04.12	
14	2	1	Akaki Vashakidze	Georgia	2:04.51	
15	2	8	Yudai Amada	Japan	2:04.89	
16	2	5	Alexander Kunert	Germany	2:05.73	
17	3	2	Petr Novak	Czech Republic	2:05.90	
18	1	6	Yeziel Morales	Puerto Rico	2:05.99	
19	2	2	Dylan Koo	Singapore	2:06.04	
20	1	7	Santiago Grassi	Argentina	2:07.17	
21	2	7	Muhammad Hamgari	Indonesia	2:07.55	
22	3	1	Matthew Mac	Canada	2:07.74	
	2	6	Tanakrit Kittiya	Thailand	DNS	

=== Final ===
The final was held at 18:43.

Rank	Lane	Name	Nationality	Time	Notes
1st place, gold medalist(s)	7	Tamás Kenderesi	Hungary	1:55.95	WJR
2nd place, silver medalist(s)	5	Benjámin Grátz	Hungary	1:57.71	
3rd place, bronze medalist(s)	6	Giacomo Carini	Italy	1:58.14	
4	4	Nils Liess	Switzerland	1:58.32	
5	3	Luiz Altamir Melo	Brazil	1:58.34	
6	2	Justin Wright	United States	1:59.40	
7	1	Ahmed Akram	Egypt	2:02.07	
8	8	Jonathan Gómez	Colombia	2:02.83	
