= Benjámin Grátz =

Hungarian swimmer (born 1996)

Personal information
- Nationality: Hungarian
- Born: 16 February 1996 (age 30) Budapest, Hungary

Sport
- Sport: Swimming
Medal record
Representing Hungary
Summer Youth Olympics
Gold medal – first place	2014 Nanjing	200 m medley
Silver medal – second place	2014 Nanjing	200 m butterfly
European Junior Championships
Gold medal – first place	2014 Dordrecht	400 m medley
Bronze medal – third place	2014 Dordrecht	200 m medley

Benjámin Grátz (born 16 February 1996) is a Hungarian swimmer. He competed in the men's 4 × 200 metre freestyle relay event at the 2016 Summer Olympics.

In 2014, he won the gold medal in the boys' 200 metre individual medley at the 2014 Summer Youth Olympics held in Nanjing, China. He also won the silver medal in the boys' 200 metre butterfly event.
