= Tunisia at the 2014 Summer Youth Olympics =

- IOC code: TUN
- NOC: Tunisian Olympic Committee
- Website: www.cnot.org.tn (in French)

in Nanjing
- Competitors: 50 in 14 sports
- Medals Ranked 64th: Gold 0 Silver 1 Bronze 1 Total 2

Summer Youth Olympics appearances (overview)
- 2010; 2014; 2018; 2026

Tunisia competed at the 2014 Summer Youth Olympics, in Nanjing, China from 16 August to 28 August 2014.

== Medalists ==
Medal	Name	Sport	Event	Date
Silver	Mohamed Fares Jlassi	Athletics	Boys' 400 metre hurdles	25 August
Bronze	Nauha Landoulsi	Weightlifting	Girls' -53 kg	18 August

== Athletics ==
Tunisia qualified six athletes.

Qualification Legend: Q=Final A (medal); qB=Final B (non-medal); qC=Final C (non-medal); qD=Final D (non-medal); qE=Final E (non-medal)

Boys
Track & road events

Athlete	Event	Heats		Final	
Athlete	Event	Result	Rank	Result	Rank
Mohamed Fares Jlassi	400 m hurdles	52.57	6 Q	50.61 PB	2nd place, silver medalist(s)
Soufien Cherni	2000 m steeplechase	5:41.81 PB	5 Q	5:51.41	8

Field events

Athlete	Event	Qualification		Final	
Athlete	Event	Distance	Rank	Distance	Rank
Oussama Nasri	Pole vault	4.30 PB	14 qB	NM	
Firas Ben Said	Hammer throw	63.21 PB	13 qB	58.99	15

Girls
Track & road events

Athlete	Event	Heats		Final	
Athlete	Event	Result	Rank	Result	Rank
Hala Hamdi	1500 m	4:28.97 SB	8 Q	4:27.77 SB	5
Marwa Bouzayani	2000 m steeplechase	6:45.37 PB	5 Q	6:44.29 PB	5

== Basketball ==
Tunisia qualified a boys' team based on the 1 June 2014 FIBA 3x3 National Federation Rankings.

Skills competition

Athlete	Event	Qualification				Final			
Athlete	Event	Round 1	Round 2	Total	Rank	Round 1	Round 2	Total	Rank
Monem Soltani	Boys' Dunk Contest	19	22	41	9	Did not advance			
Ghassen Majdoub	Boys' Dunk Contest	0	-	0	19	Did not advance			
Mahmoud Hajri	Boys' Dunk Contest	0	-	0	19	Did not advance			

=== Boys' tournament ===
Roster

- Ahmed Dhif
- Mahmoud Hajri
- Ghassen Majdoub
- Monem Soltani

Group stage

Pos	Team	Pld	W	L	PF	PA	PD	Pts	Qualification
1	Argentina	9	7	2	156	101	+55	16	Round of 16
2	Russia	9	7	2	153	117	+36	16	Round of 16
3	Spain	9	7	2	145	135	+10	16	Round of 16
4	New Zealand	9	6	3	145	129	+16	15	Round of 16
5	Venezuela	9	5	4	136	128	+8	14	Round of 16
6	Brazil	9	4	5	116	92	+24	13 (Note: BRA +5, ROU −5)	Round of 16
7	Romania	9	4	5	130	122	+8	13	Round of 16
8	Tunisia	9	3	6	115	130	−15	12	Round of 16
9	Andorra	9	2	7	129	168	−39	11	Eliminated
10	Guatemala	9	0	9	74	177	−103	9	Eliminated

Notes:

18 August 2014
17:20

Spain	16–11	Tunisia

Wutaishan Sports Center, Nanjing

18 August 2014
20:20

Tunisia	14–13	Brazil

Wutaishan Sports Center, Nanjing

19 August 2014
19:20

Romania	10–12	Tunisia

Wutaishan Sports Center, Nanjing

20 August 2014
17:00

Tunisia	15–17	New Zealand

Wutaishan Sports Center, Nanjing

20 August 2014
20:20

Guatemala	2–19	Tunisia

Wutaishan Sports Center, Nanjing

22 August 2014
19:00

Tunisia	5–13	Venezuela

Wutaishan Sports Center, Nanjing

23 August 2014
17:00

Argentina	21–9	Tunisia

Wutaishan Sports Center, Nanjing

23 August 2014
21:20

Russia	17–13	Tunisia

Wutaishan Sports Center, Nanjing

24 August 2014
20:00

Tunisia	17–21	Andorra

Wutaishan Sports Center, Nanjing

L16-finals

25 August 2014
18:40

Tunisia	11–22	Lithuania

Wutaishan Sports Center, Nanjing

Knockout stage

Round of 16	Quarterfinals	Semifinals	Final	Rank
Opposition Score	Opposition Score	Opposition Score	Opposition Score	Rank
Lithuania; L 11-22	did not advance			15

== Boxing ==
Tunisia qualified one boxer based on its performance at the 2014 AIBA Youth World Championships

Boys

Athlete	Event	Preliminaries	Semifinals	Final / RM	Rank
Athlete	Event	Opposition Result	Opposition Result	Opposition Result	Rank
Mekki Ben Said	-56 kg	Ibáñez (CUB); L 0-3	Did not advance	Bout for 5th place Takacs (SVK); L 1-2	6

== Fencing ==
Tunisia qualified one athlete based on its performance at the 2014 FIE Cadet World Championships.

Boys

Athlete	Event	Pool Round	Seed	Round of 16	Quarterfinals	Semifinals	Final / BM	Rank
Athlete	Event	Opposition Score	Seed	Opposition Score	Opposition Score	Opposition Score	Opposition Score	Rank
Fares Ferjani	Sabre	P di Martino (ARG) N Shengelia (GEO) Muhammad (BRU); W 5-0; N Kassymov (KAZ) M Giakoumatos (GRE) K Metryka (USA); W 5-2	4	Muhammad (BRU); W 15-5	Kassymov (KAZ); W 15–12	Ilyin (RUS); L 10–15	Yan (CHN); L 11–15	4

Mixed team

Athletes	Event	Round of 16	Quarterfinals	Semifinals / PM	Final / PM	Rank
Athletes	Event	Opposition Score	Opposition Score	Opposition Score	Opposition Score	Rank
Africa; Abik Boungab (ALG); Ahmed El-Sayed (EGY); Yara El-Shakrawy (EGY); Fares Ferjani (TUN); Shirwit Gaber (EGY); Salim Heroui (ALG)	Mixed team	Americas 2 L 20–30	Did not advance			9

== Gymnastics ==
=== Artistic gymnastics ===
Tunisia qualified one athlete based on its performance at the 2014 African Artistic Gymnastics Championships.

Girls

Athlete	Event	Apparatus				Total	Rank
Athlete	Event	F	V	UB	BB	Total	Rank
Rahma Mastouri	Qualification	10.000	12.700	8.300	8.600	39.600	39

== Handball ==
Tunisia qualified one team based on its performance at the 2014 African Men's Youth Handball Championship.

=== Boys' tournament ===
Roster

- Mehdi Ammar
- Ahmed Ayari
- Anouar Ben Abdallah
- Jihad Ben Araar
- Marwen Ben Dhia
- Yassine Bouteffaha
- Oussama Ghachem
- Mustapha Haj Romdhane
- Mohamed Jaouhar Hamed
- Mohamed Ghazi Memmich
- Wael Mzoughi
- Wael Saadallah
- Ghassen Toumi
- Mohamed Hamza Zouaoui

Group stage

Team	Pld	W	D	L	GF	GA	GD	Pts	Qualification
Slovenia	2	2	0	0	71	35	+36	4	Semifinals
Qatar	2	1	0	1	49	61	−12	2	Semifinals
Tunisia	2	0	0	2	35	59	−24	0	5th place game

20 August; 20:00	Tunisia	23 - 26	Qatar	Jiangning Sports Centre Gymnasium, Nanjing
20 August; 20:00	Ghachem 7 Haj Romdhane 4 Mzoughi 3 Ayari, Memmich, Bouteffaha, Ben Araar 2 Ben Abdallah 1	(13 - 11)	Guehis 6 Ahmadi 5 Dhiab 4 Abdelfattah, Helali 3 Braham, Damjanovic 2 Colo 1	Jiangning Sports Centre Gymnasium, Nanjing
20 August; 20:00	4× (yellow card) 3× (suspension)		3× (yellow card) 3× (suspension) 1× (red card)	Jiangning Sports Centre Gymnasium, Nanjing

21 August; 20:00	Slovenia	33 - 12	Tunisia	Jiangning Sports Centre Gymnasium, Nanjing
21 August; 20:00	Marguc 10; Kavcic 5 Malus, Janc 4 Prevolnik, Sokolic 3 Bedeti 2 Kikanovic, Raso 1	(18 - 4)	Ben Dhia 4 Ghachem 3 Ben Araar 2 Ayari, Haj Romdhane, Zouaoui 1	Jiangning Sports Centre Gymnasium, Nanjing
21 August; 20:00	2× (yellow card) 5× (suspension)		4× (yellow card) 10× (suspension)	Jiangning Sports Centre Gymnasium, Nanjing

Placement Match 5-6

24 August; 11:00	Brazil	38 - 31	Tunisia	Jiangning Sports Centre Gymnasium, Nanjing
24 August; 11:00		(23 - 15)		Jiangning Sports Centre Gymnasium, Nanjing

25 August; 11:00	Tunisia	27 - 28	Brazil	Jiangning Sports Centre Gymnasium, Nanjing
25 August; 11:00		(12 - 13)		Jiangning Sports Centre Gymnasium, Nanjing

== Judo ==
Tunisia qualified one athlete based on its performance at the 2013 Cadet World Judo Championships.

Individual

Athlete	Event	Round of 32	Round of 16	Quarterfinals	Semifinals	Rep 1	Rep 2	Rep 3	Rep 4	Final / BM	Rank
Athlete	Event	Opposition Result	Opposition Result	Opposition Result	Opposition Result	Opposition Result	Opposition Result	Opposition Result	Opposition Result	Opposition Result	Rank
Oussama Sinoussi	Boys' -81 kg	Farukhi (TJK); W 100-000	Krieber-gagnon (CAN); L 000-100	Did not advance		Bye	Grinda (MON); W 100-000	Milic (MNE); L 000-000	Did not advance		11

Team

Athletes	Event	Round of 16	Quarterfinals	Semifinals	Final	Rank
Athletes	Event	Opposition Result	Opposition Result	Opposition Result	Opposition Result	Rank
Team Kerr; Sophie Berger (BEL); Karla Lorenzana (GUA); Saliou Ndiaye (SEN); Jennifer Schwille (GER); Oussama Snoussi (TUN); Pawel Wawrzyczek (POL); Bauyrzhan Zhauyntayev (KAZ)	Mixed Team	Team Berghmans; L 2-4	Did not advance			9

== Rowing ==
Tunisia qualified two boats based on its performance at the African Qualification Regatta.

Athlete	Event	Heats		Repechage		Semifinals		Final	
Athlete	Event	Time	Rank	Time	Rank	Time	Rank	Time	Rank
Mohamed Taieb	Boys' Single Sculls	3:31.42	3 R	3:24.51	3 SF C/D	3:27.10	1 FC	3:30.25	14
Nour Ettaieb	Girls' Single Sculls	3:57.96	4 R	3:57.63	3 SF C/D	3:57.09	2 FC	4:02.21	15

Qualification Legend: FA=Final A (medal); FB=Final B (non-medal); FC=Final C (non-medal); FD=Final D (non-medal); SA/B=Semifinals A/B; SC/D=Semifinals C/D; R=Repechage

== Rugby sevens ==
Tunisia qualified a girls' team based on its performance at the 2013 Rugby World Cup Sevens.

=== Girls' tournament ===
Roster

- Islem Abdallah
- Lina Bennour
- Ons Boudokhane
- Samira Dhahri
- Dorsaf Dhouibi
- Faten Dorai
- Oumayma Dziri
- Imen Ellili
- Safa Gandouz
- Ines Hamdi
- Amira Letaief
- Khouthar Nasr

Group stage

Pos	Team	Pld	W	D	L	PF	PA	PD	Pts
1	Australia	5	5	0	0	146	17	+129	15
2	China	5	4	0	1	144	32	+112	13
3	Canada	5	3	0	2	108	71	+37	11
4	United States	5	1	1	3	59	98	−39	8
5	Spain	5	1	1	3	44	129	−85	8
6	Tunisia	5	0	0	5	12	166	−154	5

17 August 2014
09:00

Australia	31 - 0	Tunisia

Youth Olympic Sports Park

17 August 2014
17:00

Spain	32 - 0	Tunisia

Youth Olympic Sports Park

18 August 2014
10:00

China	34 - 0	Tunisia

Youth Olympic Sports Park

18 August 2014
16:00

Canada	43 - 12	Tunisia

Youth Olympic Sports Park

19 August 2014
09:00

United States	26 - 0	Tunisia

Youth Olympic Sports Park

Placing 5-6

19 August 2014
15:30

Spain	25 - 5	Tunisia 6th

Youth Olympic Sports Park

== Sailing ==
Tunisia qualified one boat based on its performance at the Techno 293 African Continental Qualifiers.

Athlete	Event	Race											Net Points	Final Rank
Athlete	Event	1	2	3	4	5	6	7	8	9	10	M*	Net Points	Final Rank
Safouan Mami	Boys' Techno 293	17	17	17	(19)	19	17	6	Cancelled			112.00	93.00	17

== Swimming ==
Tunisia qualified two swimmers.

Boys

Athlete	Event	Heat		Semifinal		Final	
Athlete	Event	Time	Rank	Time	Rank	Time	Rank
Mohamed Mehdi Lagili	200 m freestyle	1:54.81	27	—N/a		Did not advance	
Mohamed Ali Fekiri	100 m breaststroke	1:06.96	33	Did not advance			
Mohamed Ali Fekiri	200 m breaststroke	2:22.37	21	—N/a		Did not advance	

== Table Tennis ==
Tunisia qualified one athlete based on its performance at the African Qualification Event.

Singles

Athlete	Event	Group stage	Rank	Round of 16	Quarterfinals	Semifinals	Final / BM	Rank
Athlete	Event	Opposition Score	Rank	Opposition Score	Opposition Score	Opposition Score	Opposition Score	Rank
Kerem Ben Yahia	Boys	Reitšpies (CZE); L 2–3	4 qB	Consolation Round; Ghallab (EGY); W 3–1	Consolation Round; Ranefur (SWE); L 0–3	Did not advance		21
Kerem Ben Yahia	Boys	Zatówka (POL); L 1–3	4 qB	Consolation Round; Ghallab (EGY); W 3–1	Consolation Round; Ranefur (SWE); L 0–3	Did not advance		21
Kerem Ben Yahia	Boys	Levenko (AUT); L 2–3	4 qB	Consolation Round; Ghallab (EGY); W 3–1	Consolation Round; Ranefur (SWE); L 0–3	Did not advance		21

Team

Athletes	Event	Group stage	Rank	Round of 16	Quarterfinals	Semifinals	Final / BM	Rank
Athletes	Event	Opposition Score	Rank	Opposition Score	Opposition Score	Opposition Score	Opposition Score	Rank
Africa 1 Sannah Lagsir (ALG); Kerem Ben Yahia (TUN)	Mixed	Wan (GER); Ort (GER); L 0–3	4 qB	Consolation Round; Imre (HUN); Szudi (HUN); L 0–2	Did not advance			25
Africa 1 Sannah Lagsir (ALG); Kerem Ben Yahia (TUN)	Mixed	Piccolin (ITA); Schmid (SUI); L 0–3	4 qB	Consolation Round; Imre (HUN); Szudi (HUN); L 0–2	Did not advance			25
Africa 1 Sannah Lagsir (ALG); Kerem Ben Yahia (TUN)	Mixed	Lorenzotti (URU); Calderano (BRA); L 0–3	4 qB	Consolation Round; Imre (HUN); Szudi (HUN); L 0–2	Did not advance			25

Qualification Legend: Q=Main Bracket (medal); qB=Consolation Bracket (non-medal)

== Weightlifting ==
Tunisia qualified 1 quota in the boys' and girls' events based on the team ranking after the 2014 Weightlifting Junior & Youth African Championships.

Boys

Athlete	Event	Snatch		Clean & jerk		Total	Rank
Athlete	Event	Result	Rank	Result	Rank	Total	Rank
Faouzi Kraydi	−56 kg	108	3	127	5	235	5

Girls

Athlete	Event	Snatch		Clean & jerk		Total	Rank
Athlete	Event	Result	Rank	Result	Rank	Total	Rank
Nauha Landoulsi	−53 kg	79	4	96	3	175	3rd place, bronze medalist(s)

== Wrestling ==
Tunisia qualified two athletes based on its performance at the 2014 African Cadet Championships.

Key:
- VT - Victory by Fall.
- PP - Decision by Points - the loser with technical points.
- PO - Decision by Points - the loser without technical points.

Boys

Athlete	Event	Group stage				Final / RM	Rank
Athlete	Event	Opposition Score	Opposition Score	Opposition Score	Rank	Opposition Score	Rank
Ayoub Barraj	Freestyle -76kg	Simonia (GEO); L 0-4 ^{ST}	Rivera (HON); W 4-0 ^{ST}	Izquierdo (COL); L 1-3 ^{PP}	3 Q	Gurm (CAN); W 4-0 ^{ST}	5
Souleymen Nasr	Greco-Roman -58kg	Destribats (ARG); L 0-4 ^{ST}	de Los Santos (DOM); W 4-0 ^{VT}	Mikaelyan (ARM); L 0-4 ^{ST}	3 Q	Kurnalaly (KAZ); L 0-4 ^{ST}	6
