= Luca Homonnai =

Hungarian canoeist (born 1998)

Personal information
- Nationality: Hungarian
- Born: 11 October 1998 (age 27) Orosháza, Hungary

Sport
- Sport: Canoe sprint
Medal record
Representing Hungary
World Championships
Silver medal – second place	2015 Milan	K–2 200 m
Youth Olympic Games
Silver medal – second place	2014 Nanjing	Sprint K1

Luca Homonnai (born 11 October 1998) is a Hungarian sprint canoer. She won a silver medal at the 2015 ICF Canoe Sprint World Championships with Natasa Dusev-Janics in K–2 200 m.

Homonnai also won silver medal at the 2014 Summer Youth Olympics in the head to head sprint kayak one event.
