= Rahma Mastouri =

Tunisian artistic gymnast

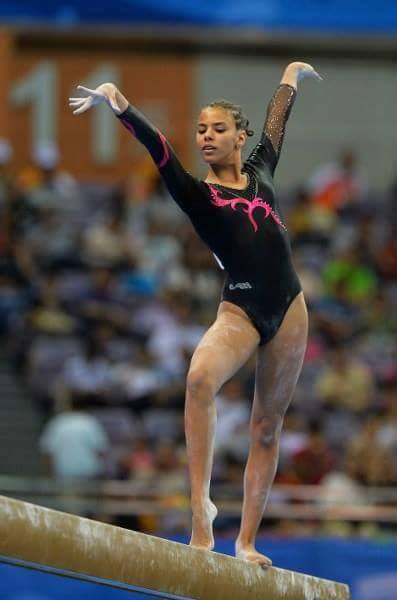
- Mastouri at the 2014 Summer Youth Olympics

Personal information
- Born: 29 December 1999 (age 26) Tunis, Tunisia

Gymnastics career
- Discipline: Women's artistic gymnastics
- Country represented: Tunisia

Rahma Mastouri (born 29 December 1999) is a Tunisian former artistic gymnast. She represented Tunisia at the 2014 Summer Youth Olympics and at multiple African Championships.

== Gymnastics career ==
=== Junior ===
Mastouri competed at the 2012 African Junior Championships, which were held in her hometown, Tunis. She and teammates Oumaima Nasri and Jihene Yahyaoui finished fifth in the team competition. Individually, she placed eighth in the all-around with a total score of 42.250. In the floor exercise final, she won the bronze medal behind Egyptian gymnasts Rana Elbialy and Aya Mahgoub.

At the 2014 African Junior Championships in Pretoria, South Africa, Mastouri finished 11th in the individual all-around competition with a total score of 41.900. She also placed fifth in the vault final and sixth in the uneven bars final. She was then selected to represent Tunisia at the 2014 Summer Youth Olympics in Nanjing, China. She finished 39th in the all-around during the qualification round with a total score of 39.600 and did not advance into the all-around final. She also did not advance into any of the apparatus finals. Her best apparatus ranking was on the uneven bars, where she finished 35th.

=== Senior ===
Mastouri became age-eligible for senior international competitions in 2015. She competed at the 2016 African Artistic Gymnastics Championships in Algiers, Algeria, and placed sixth in the all-around competition with a total score of 43.200. She advanced to all four apparatus finals– finishing fifth on the vault, sixth on the uneven bars, fifth on the balance beam, and sixth on the floor exercise. She has not competed at an international event since the 2016 African Championships.
