= Kenya at the 2014 Summer Youth Olympics =

- IOC code: KEN
- NOC: National Olympic Committee of Kenya

in Nanjing
- Competitors: 24 in 3 sports
- Medals Ranked 31st: Gold 2 Silver 2 Bronze 1 Total 5

Summer Youth Olympics appearances
- 2010; 2014; 2018

Kenya competed at the 2014 Summer Youth Olympics, in Nanjing, China from 16 August to 28 August 2014.

== Athletics ==
Kenya qualified 11 athletes.

Qualification Legend: Q=Final A (medal); qB=Final B (non-medal); qC=Final C (non-medal); qD=Final D (non-medal); qE=Final E (non-medal)

Boys
Track & road events

Athlete	Event	Heats		Final	
Athlete	Event	Result	Rank	Result	Rank
Ian Mutuku	400 m	47.56	6 Q	47.08	4
Anthony Kiptoo	800 m	1:52.55	13 qB	DQ	
Gilbert Kwemoi Soet	1500 m	3:45.21 PB	1 Q	3:41.99 PB	1st place, gold medalist(s)
Moses Koech	3000 m	8:06.50	2 Q	8:06.33	3rd place, bronze medalist(s)
Geoffrey Kipngetich	400 m hurdles	53.10	9 qB	52.87	11
Amos Kirui	2000 m steeplechase	5:41.70	3 Q	5:40.29	2nd place, silver medalist(s)

Girls
Track & road events

Athlete	Event	Heats		Final	
Athlete	Event	Result	Rank	Result	Rank
Maureen Nyatichi Thomas	200 m	24.33	3 Q	24.43	4
Agnes Mulee Ngovi	800 m	2:10.26	9 qB	DNS	
Winfred Mbithe	1500 m	4:22.57	3 Q	4:17.91	2nd place, silver medalist(s)
Jackline Chepkoech	3000 m	9:08.54 PB	5 Q	9:20.43	6
Rosefline Chepngetich	2000 m steeplechase	6:20.10 SB	1 Q	6:22.67	1st place, gold medalist(s)

== Rugby sevens ==
Kenya qualified a boys' team based on its performance at the 2013 Rugby World Cup Sevens.

=== Boys' tournament ===
Roster

- Daniel Abuonji
- Brian Gisemba
- Edgar Khafumi
- Lamech Kimutai
- Brian Mokua
- John Ochar
- Alex Olaba
- Bill Omondi
- Ian Onyango
- Nelson Sangura
- Paul Songoi
- Keith Wasike

Group Stage

Pos	Team	Pld	W	D	L	PF	PA	PD	Pts
1	Argentina	5	5	0	0	145	34	+111	15
2	France	5	4	0	1	98	55	+43	13
3	Fiji	5	2	0	3	82	70	+12	9
4	Kenya	5	2	0	3	68	107	−39	9
5	Japan	5	2	0	3	73	131	−58	9
6	United States	5	0	0	5	59	128	−69	5

17 August 2014
11:00

Kenya	22 - 12	United States

Youth Olympic Sports Park

17 August 2014
18:00

Kenya	0 - 24	France

Youth Olympic Sports Park

18 August 2014
11:00

Kenya	5 - 32	Argentina

Youth Olympic Sports Park

18 August 2014
17:30

Kenya	24 - 27	Japan

Youth Olympic Sports Park

19 August 2014
11:30

Fiji	12 - 17	Kenya

Youth Olympic Sports Park

Semifinal

19 August 2014
15:30

Argentina	19 - 12	Kenya

Youth Olympic Sports Park

Bronze Medal Match

20 August 2014
09:00

Kenya 4th	0 - 12	Fiji

Youth Olympic Sports Park

== Weightlifting ==
Kenya was given a reallocation spot to compete.

Boys

Athlete	Event	Snatch		Clean & jerk		Total	Rank
Athlete	Event	Result	Rank	Result	Rank	Total	Rank
Evans Sikoto	−69 kg	83	12	106	12	189	12
