= Tatyana Kapustina =

Kazakhstani weightlifter

Personal information
- Born: 15 November 1998 (age 27)
- Weight: 84.08 kg (185.4 lb)

Sport
- Country: Kazakhstan
- Sport: Weightlifting
- Weight class: +63 kg
- Updated on 9 November 2016

Tatyana Kapustina (born 15 November 1998) is a Kazakhstani weightlifter, who competed in the +63 kg category and represented Kazakhstan at international competitions.

As a junior, she won the bronze medal at the 2014 Summer Youth Olympics. She won a gold medal at the 2015 IWF Youth World Weightlifting Championships.

== Major results ==
Year	Venue	Weight	Snatch (kg)				Clean & Jerk (kg)				Total	Rank
Year	Venue	Weight	1	2	3	Rank	1	2	3	Rank	Total	Rank
Summer Youth Olympics
2014	Nanjing, China	+63 kg	98	102	105	---	~~120~~	~~120~~	123	---	228	3rd place, bronze medalist(s)
