= Swimming at the 2011 European Youth Summer Olympic Festival =

Swimming at the 2011 European Youth Summer Olympic Festival was held from 25 to 29 July 2011. The competitions took place at the Mehmet Akif Ersoy Indoor Swimming Pool in Trabzon, Turkey. Boys born 1995/1996 and girls born 1997/1998 participated in the following 31 disciplines.

== Competition schedule ==
=== Day 1 ===
Event date	Event day	Event details
25 July	Monday	Girls' 400 m Freestyle
25 July	Monday	Boys' 100 m Freestyle
25 July	Monday	Girls' 100 m Butterfly
25 July	Monday	Boys' 200 m Backstroke
25 July	Monday	Girls' 200 m Breaststroke
25 July	Monday	Boys' 200 m Individual medley
25 July	Monday	Girls' 4 × 100 m Freestyle
25 July	Monday	Boys' 4 × 100 m Freestyle

=== Day 2 ===
Event date	Event day	Event details
26 July	Tuesday	Boys' 400 m Freestyle
26 July	Tuesday	Girls' 100 m Freestyle
26 July	Tuesday	Boys' 100 m Butterfly
26 July	Tuesday	Girls' 200 m Backstroke
26 July	Tuesday	Boys' 200 m Breaststroke
26 July	Tuesday	Girls' 200 m Individual medley
26 July	Tuesday	4 × 200 m Freestyle Mixed

=== Day 3 ===
Event date	Event day	Event details
28 July	Thursday	Girls' 50 m Freestyle
28 July	Thursday	Boys' 1500 m Freestyle
28 July	Thursday	Girls' 400 m Individual medley
28 July	Thursday	Boys' 200 m Butterfly
28 July	Thursday	Girls' 100 m Backstroke
28 July	Thursday	Boys' 100 m Breaststroke
28 July	Thursday	Girls' 200 m Freestyle
28 July	Thursday	Boys' 50 m Freestyle

=== Day 4 ===
Event date	Event day	Event details
29 July	Friday	Girls' 800 m Freestyle
29 July	Friday	Boys' 400 m Individual medley
29 July	Friday	Girls' 200 m Butterfly
29 July	Friday	Boys' 100 m Backstroke
29 July	Friday	Girls' 100 m Breaststroke
29 July	Friday	Boys' 200 m Freestyle
29 July	Friday	Girls' 4 × 100 m Medley
29 July	Friday	Boys' 4 × 100 m Medley

== Medal summary ==
=== Medal table ===
Rank	Nation	Gold	Silver	Bronze	Total
1	Russia	12	8	4	24
2	Great Britain	9	2	4	15
3	Italy	3	6	3	12
4	Hungary	3	2	4	9
5	Germany	2	5	3	10
6	Lithuania	1	2	1	4
7	Sweden	1	0	0	1
8	France	0	2	1	3
9	Latvia	0	2	0	2
10	Slovenia	0	1	2	3
11	Czech Republic	0	1	1	2
12	Ukraine	0	1	0	1
13	Poland	0	0	4	4
14	Denmark	0	0	1	1
14	Ireland	0	0	1	1
14	Netherlands	0	0	1	1
14	Norway	0	0	1	1
14	Spain	0	0	1	1
Totals (18 entries)		31	32	32	95

=== Medal events ===
==== Boys' events ====
Games	Gold		Silver		Bronze	
50m Freestyle	Evgeny Sedov; Russia	22.98	Janis Saltans; Latvia	23.51	Brian O'Sullivan; Ireland	23.66
100m Freestyle	Andrea Mitchel D'Arrigo; Italy	51.47	Evgeny Sedov; Russia	51.79	Benjamin Jany; France	52.27
200m Freestyle	Andrea Mitchel D'Arrigo; Italy	1:50.28	Benjamin Jany; France	1:53.02	Victor Zakharov; Russia	1:53.54
400m Freestyle	Matthew Johnson; Great Britain	3:54.70; NR16	Andrea Mitchel D'Arrigo; Italy	3:55.32; NYR	Jan Micka; Czech Republic	3:58.48
1500m Freestyle	Joel Knight; Great Britain	15:28.86; NR15	Jan Micka; Czech Republic	15:38.68	Igor Bespalov; Russia	15:41.65
100m Backstroke	Nathan Theodoris; Great Britain	57.16	Jānis Šaltāns; Latvia	57.43 NR	Evgeny Sedov; Russia	57.66
200m Backstroke	Nathan Theodoris; Great Britain	2:02.54	Danas Rapšys; Lithuania	2:04.01; NRU17	Morten Hansen; Norway	2:04.86
100m Breaststroke	Johannes Skagius; Sweden	1:03.01; NYR	Vsevolod Zanko; Russia	1:03.49	Maciej Stanislaw Holub; Poland	1:04.26
200m Breaststroke	Daniele Ceccuti; Italy	2:19.54	Denys Barabash; Ukraine	2:19.86	Lucas Greven; Netherlands	2:20.24
100m Butterfly	Semen Makovich; Russia	55.31	Francesco Giordano; Italy	55.47	Tobias Gjerloff; Denmark	55.63
200m Butterfly	Matthew Johnson; Great Britain	2:00.46; NR16	Alexander Kudashev; Russia	2:02.16	Jerzy Mateusz Twarowski; Poland	2:02.73
200m Medley	Matthew Johnson; Great Britain	2:04.35	Mikhail Dovgalyuk; Russia	2:05.60	Dávid Földházi; Hungary	2:06.58
400m Medley	Matthew Johnson; Great Britain	4:22.02	Semen Makovich; Russia	4:23.39	Mateusz Nachtman; Poland	4:31.90
4 × 100 m Freestyle Relay	Russia; Igor Bespalov (52.32); Victor Zakharov (52.13); Semen Makovich (52.33); Evgeny Sedov (51.93)	3:28.71	Great Britain; Oliver Leonard (52.95); Karl Morgan (51.72); Matthew Watkinson (51.98); Matthew Johnson (52.38)	3:29.03	Italy; Francesco Giordano (52.18); Davide Casarin (52.97); Giuseppe Ronci (54.36); Andrea Mitchel D'Arrigo (51.60)	3:31.11
4 × 100 m Medley Relay	Russia; Evgeny Sedov (57.75); Vsevolod Zanko (1:03.20); Alexander Kudashev (55.95); Igor Bespalov (52.06)	3:48.96	Italy; Luca Mencarini (58.51); Daniele Ceccuti (1:04.08); Francesco Giordano (55.52); Andrea Mitchel D'Arrigo (51.20)	3:49.31	Poland; Lukasz Daniel Bielecki (58.86); Maciej Stanislaw Holub (1:04.52); Jerzy Mateusz Twarowski (55.57); Jan Krzysztof Holub (52.07)	3:51.02
NYR = national youth record | NRU17 = national record under 17 years | NR16 = national record aged 16 | NR15 = national record aged 15

==== Girls' events ====
Games	Gold		Silver		Bronze	
50m Freestyle	Anna Stephanie Dietterle; Germany	25.65; NR14	Ruta Meilutyte; Lithuania	25.67; NR	Giorgia Biondani; Italy	25.94; NYR
100m Freestyle	Anna Stephanie Dietterle; Germany	55.85	Mariya Baklakova; Russia	56.09; NYR	Ruta Meilutyte; Lithuania	56.41; NR
200m Freestyle	Mariya Baklakova; Russia	2:00.27; NYR	Nikoletta Kiss; Hungary	2:04.25	Janine Wirz; Germany	2:05.93
400m Freestyle	Mariya Baklakova; Russia	4:15.17	Nikoletta Kiss; Hungary	4:15.30	Siwan Thomas-Howells; Great Britain	4:18.61
800m Freestyle	Nikoletta Kiss; Hungary	8:51.45	Leonie Antonie Beck; Germany	8:54.88	Ellena Jones; Great Britain	9:01.58
100m Backstroke	Harriet Cooper; Great Britain	1:02.73	Beatrice Cannistraro; Italy	1:04.40; NYR	Daria Ustinova; Russia	1:04.63
200m Backstroke	Daria Ustinova; Russia	2:17.19	Sonnele Aylin Oeztuerk; Germany	2:17.42	Shauntelle Austin; Great Britain	2:17.83
100m Breaststroke	Ruta Meilutyte; Lithuania	1:07.96; NR	Anna Ganus; Russia	1:11.25	Tjasa Pintar; Slovenia	1:12.23
200m Breaststroke	Anna Ganus; Russia	2:32.43	Margarethe T. Hummel; Germany	2:35.70	Sandra Garcia; Spain	2:36.21
100m Butterfly	Anastasia Guzhenkova; Russia	1:01.49	Marie Wattel; France	1:01.74; NYR	Adel Juhasz; Hungary	1:02.44
200m Butterfly	Dalma Sebestyén; Hungary	2:15.18	Anastasia Guzhenkova; Russia	2:15.65	Shauntelle Austin; Great Britain	2:17.63
200m Medley	Dalma Sebestyén; Hungary	2:19.18	Tjasa Pintar; Slovenia	2:19.85	Arianna Castiglioni; Italy	2:21.99
400m Medley	Ellena Jones; Great Britain	4:55.93	Leonie Antonie Beck; Germany	4:56.06	Zsanett Kovacs; Hungary	4:57.48
4 × 100 m Freestyle Relay	Russia; Elizaveta Korolkova (57.08); Rozaliya Nasretdinova (57.33); Kristina Pukhova (57.27); Mariya Baklakova (55.89)	3:47.57; NYR	Germany; Anna Stephanie Dietterle (55.77); Janine Wirz (58.12); Rosalie Kaethner (58.29); Nele Klein (57.94)	3:50.12	Slovenia; Nastja Govejšek (57.13); Gaja Natlacen (59.25); Kaja Sajovec (58.81); Tjasa Pintar (57.34)	3:52.53; NYR
4 × 100 m Medley Relay	Russia; Daria Ustinova (1:04.42); Anna Ganus (1:10.70); Anastasia Guzhenkova (1:02.07); Mariya Baklakova (55.78)	4:12.97	Italy; Beatrice Cannistraro (1:04.65); Arianna Castiglioni (1:12.14); Claudia Tarzia (1:01.74); Giorgia Biondani (55.97)	4:14.50	Germany; Sonnele Aylin Oeztuerk (1:05.85); Margarethe T. Hummel (1:12.72); Rosalie Kaethner (1:03.24); Anna Stephanie Dietterle (55.52)	4:17.33
NR = national record | NYR = national youth record | NR14 = national record aged 14

==== Mixed events ====
Games	Gold		Silver		Bronze	
4 × 200 m Freestyle Relay	Russia; Victor Zakharov (1:53.25); Elizaveta Korolkova (2:03.67); Igor Bespalov (1:53.58); Mariya Baklakova (2:01.31)	7:51.81	Great Britain; Matthew Johnson (1:54.85); Ellena Jones (2:03.25); Alex Dunk (1:56.12); Siwan Thomas-Howells (2:04.98)	7:59.20	Hungary; Benjámin Grátz (1:53.83); Melinda Novoszáth (2:06.86); Dávid Földházi (1:56.20); Nikoleta Kiss (2:04.01)	8:00.90
