= 2013 European Junior Swimming Championships =

Water sport competitions

The 2013 European Junior Swimming Championships were held from 10 to 14 July 2013 in Poznań, Poland. The Championships were organized by LEN, the European Swimming League, and were held in a 50-meter pool. Per LEN rules, competitors must be age 15 or 16 for girls and 17 or 18 for boys.

== Results ==
=== Boys ===
Games	Gold		Silver		Bronze	
50 m freestyle	Evgeny Sedov; Russia	22.07	Bogdan Plavin; Ukraine	22.43	Fotios Mylonas; Greece	22.64
100 m freestyle	Evgeny Sedov; Russia	49.23	Kyle Stolk; Netherlands	49.94	Sebastian Szczepanski; Poland	50.22
200 m freestyle	James Guy; Great Britain	1:48.45	Alexander Krasnykh; Russia	1:49.10	Andrea Mitchell D'Arrigo; Italy	1:49.56
400 m freestyle	Jan Micka; Czech Republic	3:50.74	Matthew Johnson; Great Britain	3:51.11	Andrea Mitchell D'Arrigo; Italy	3:51.74
800 m freestyle	Pawel Furtek; Poland	7:59.12	Jan Micka; Czech Republic	7:59.49	Wojciech Wojdak; Poland	8:01.28
1500 m freestyle	Jan Micka; Czech Republic	15:13.51	Pawel Furtek; Poland	15:13.85	Caleb Hughes; Great Britain	15:19.63
50 m backstroke	Grigory Tarasevich; Russia	25.46	Evgeny Sedov; Russia	25.55	Apostolos Christou; Greece	25.76
100 m backstroke	Grigory Tarasevich; Russia	55.08	Danas Rapšys; Lithuania	55.44	Simone Sabbioni; Italy	55.73
200 m backstroke	Danas Rapšys; Lithuania	1:59.31	Grigory Tarasevich; Russia	1:59.51	Dávid Földházi; Hungary	1:59.89
50 m breaststroke	Johannes Skagius; Sweden	27.71	Vsevolod Zanko; Russia; Peter John Stevens; Slovenia	28.06		
100 m breaststroke	Vsevolod Zanko; Russia	1:00.96	Johannes Skagius; Sweden	1:01.27	Ilya Khomenko; Russia	1:01.48
200 m breaststroke	Mikhail Dorinov; Russia	2:12.27	Alexander Palatov; Russia	2:12.69	Yannick Lindenberg; Germany	2:13.92
50 m butterfly	Evgeny Sedov; Russia	23.85	Jonas Bergmann; Germany	24.06	Daniel Steen Andersen; Denmark	24.25
100 m butterfly	Daniel Steen Andersen; Denmark	53.61	Sascha Subarsky; Austria	53.71	Mattia Mugnaini; Italy	53.73
200 m butterfly	Matthew Johnson; Great Britain	1:58.84	Alexander Kudashev; Russia	1:59.09	Pedro Terres Illescas; Spain	1:59.73
200 m individual medley	Semen Makovich; Russia	1:59:94	Max Litchfield; Great Britain	2:02.13	Mark Szaranek; Great Britain	2:02.49
400 m individual medley	Semen Makovich; Russia	4:14.65 CR	Matthew Johnson; Great Britain	4:17.47	Alexander Osipenko; Russia	4:18.67
4x100 m freestyle	Poland; Jan Hołub; Rafal Bugdol; Maciej Falaciński; Sebastian Szczepański	3:21.71	Russia; Evgeny Sedov; Ivan Kuzmenko; Daniil Melyanenkov; Sergey Tarkhanov	3:22.61	Germany; Damian Wierling; Poul Zellmann; Lucas Schenke; Alexander Kunert	3:22.72
4x200 m freestyle	Great Britain; Max Litchfield; Alex Dunk; Caleb Hughes; James Guy	7:19.84	Spain; Miguel Duran Navia; Marc Calzada Munoz; Arnau Rovira Guillen; G. Sanchez Gtrez-Cabello	7:23.28	Germany; Poul Zellmann; Lucas Schenke; Michael Stoehner; Damian Wierling	7:23.40
4x100 m medley	Russia; Grigoriy Tarasevich; Vsevolod Zanko; Alexander Kudashev; Evgeny Sedov	3:37.93 CR	Germany; Carl-Louis Schwarz; Yannick Lindenberg; Alexander Kunert; Damian Wierling	3:41.45	Sweden; Axel Petersson; Johannes Skagius; Joachim Bratt; Emil Gustavsson	3:42.80

=== Girls ===
Games	Gold		Silver		Bronze	
50 m freestyle	Rozaliya Nasretdinova; Russia	25.05 CR	Ruta Meilutyte; Lithuania	25.26	Giorgia Biondani; Italy	25.31
100 m freestyle	Mariya Baklakova; Russia	54.78 CR	Fátima Gallardo; Spain	55.76	Julie-Marie Meynen; Luxembourg	55.92
200 m freestyle	Mariya Baklakova; Russia	1:58.21 CR	Valeria Salamatina; Russia	2:01.11	Melinda Novoszáth; Hungary	2:01.94
400 m freestyle	Leonie Antonia Beck; Germany	4:12.87	Nikoletta Kiss; Hungary	4:13.43	Linda Caponi; Italy	4:13.86
800 m freestyle	Leonie Antonia Beck; Germany	8:33.08	Alisia Tettamanzi; Italy	8:41.73	Nikoletta Kiss; Hungary	8:43.07
1500 m freestyle	Jimena Perez Blanco; Spain	16:30.63	Flora Sibalin; Hungary	16:36.80	Alisia Tettamanzi; Italy	16:41.49
50 m backstroke	Daria Ustinova; Russia	28.63	Kathleen Dawson; Great Britain	28.69	Laura Riedemann; Germany	29.05
100 m backstroke	Daria Ustinova; Russia	1:01.14	Kathleen Dawson; Great Britain	1:02.21	Laura Riedemann; Germany	1:02.61
200 m backstroke	Sonnele Oeztuerk; Germany	2:13.90	Ugnė Mažutaitytė; Lithuania	2:14.28	Laura Riedemann; Germany	2:14.61
50 m breaststroke	Viktoriya Solnceva; Ukraine	30.83 CR	Marlene Huether; Germany	31.61	Margarethe Hummel; Germany	31.65
100 m breaststroke	Ruta Meilutyte; Lithuania	1:05.48 CR	Viktoriya Solnceva; Ukraine	1:07.85	Marlene Huether; Germany	1:09.20
200 m breaststroke	Viktoriya Solnceva; Ukraine	2:25.97	Anastasiya Malyavina; Ukraine	2:28.71	Silvia Guerra; Italy	2:30.03
50 m butterfly	Rozaliya Nasretdinova; Russia	26.56	Lucie Svěcená; Czech Republic	26.88	Nastja Govejšek; Slovenia	26.99
100 m butterfly	Claudia Tarzia; Italy	59.68	Lucie Svěcená; Czech Republic	59.69	Marie Wattel; France	59.88
200 m butterfly	Anastasia Guzhenkova; Russia	2:11.24	Emma Day; Great Britain	2:12.14	Dalma Sebestyén; Hungary	2:12.75
200 m individual medley	Dalma Sebestyén; Hungary	2:16.10	Emma Day; Great Britain	2:16.14	Lisa Katharina Hoepink; Germany	2:16.64
400 m individual medley	Adel Farkas; Hungary	4:44.79	Amber Keegan; Great Britain	4:46.83	Emily Siebrecht; Germany	4:48.05
4x100 m freestyle	Russia; Mariya Baklakova; Rozaliya Nasretdinova; Daria Kartashova; Daria Ustinova	3:42.58 CR	Germany; Anna-Stephanie Dietterle; Helen Scholtissek; Nele Klein; Rosalie Kaethner	3:45.50	Great Britain; Harriet Cooper; Linda Shaw; Lucy Hope; Katie Latham	3:46.89
4x200 m freestyle	Russia; Valeria Salamatina; Anastasia Guzhenkova; Polina Volkodavova; Mariya Baklakova	8:01.62 CR	Germany; Antonia Massone; Rosalie Kaethner; Alina Jungklaus; Leonie Antonia Beck	8:07.75	Spain; Elisa Sanchez Morales; Fatima Gallardo Carapeto; Carmen Rico Perez; Africa Zamorano Sanz	8:10.04
4x100 m medley	Russia; Daria Ustinova; Polina Kazina; Anastasia Guzhenkova; Mariya Baklakova	4:06.11 CR	Germany; Laura Riedemann; Margarethe Hummel; Lisa Katharina Hoepink; Helen Scholtissek	4:07.48	Poland; Agata Naskręt; Dominika Sztandera; Paulina Nogaj; Wioletta Orczykowska	4:10.98

=== Mixed Events ===
Games	Gold		Silver		Bronze	
4x100 m freestyle	Russia; Evgeny Sedov; Ivan Kuzmenko; Rozaliya Nasretdinova; Mariya Baklakova	3:29.10 CR	Germany; Damian Wierling; Nele Klein; Alexander Kunert; Helen Scholtissek	3:34.23	United Kingdom; Jack Smith; Mark Szaranek; Harriet Cooper; Katie Latham	3:33.25
4x100 m medley	Russia; Daria Ustinova; Vsevolod Zanko; Alexander Kudashev; Mariya Baklakova	3:50.58	Germany; Laura Riedemann; Yannick Lindenberg; Alexander Kunert; Helen Scholtissek	3:53.93	Poland; Agata Naskręt; Marcin Stolarski; Jerzy Twarowski; Wioletta Orczykowska	3:54.30

== Medal table ==
* Host nation (Poland)

Rank	Nation	Gold	Silver	Bronze	Total
1	Russia (RUS)	22	8	2	32
2	Great Britain (GBR)	3	9	3	15
3	Germany (GER)	3	7	11	21
4	Czech Republic (CZE)	2	3	0	5
4	Lithuania (LTU)	2	3	0	5
4	Ukraine (UKR)	2	3	0	5
7	Hungary (HUN)	2	2	4	8
8	Poland (POL)*	2	1	4	7
9	Spain (ESP)	1	2	2	5
10	Italy (ITA)	1	1	8	10
11	Sweden (SWE)	1	1	1	3
12	Denmark (DEN)	1	0	1	2
13	Slovenia (SLO)	0	1	1	2
14	Austria (AUT)	0	1	0	1
14	Netherlands (NED)	0	1	0	1
16	Greece (GRE)	0	0	2	2
17	France (FRA)	0	0	1	1
17	Luxembourg (LUX)	0	0	1	1
Totals (18 entries)		42	43	41	126

== Participating countries ==
42 countries will take part in 2013 European Junior Swimming Championships with total of 511 swimmers.
