= 2012 European Junior Swimming Championships =

Water sport competitions

The 2012 European Junior Swimming Championships were held from 4–8 July 2012 in Antwerp, Belgium. The Championships were organized by LEN, the European Swimming League, and were held in a 50-meter pool. Per LEN rules, competitors have age 15 or 16 for girls and 17 or 18 for boys.

== Results ==
=== Boys ===
Games	Gold		Silver		Bronze	
50 m freestyle	Maximilian Oswald; Germany	22.28	Volodymyr Suschyk; Ukraine	22.60	Bogdan Plavin; Ukraine	22.63
100 m freestyle	Maximilian Oswald; Germany	49.68	Stepan Surkov; Russia	50.27	Oscar Ekstroem; Sweden	50.35
200 m freestyle	Riccardo Maestri; Italy	1:48.62	Maximilian Oswald; Germany	1:49.55	Christian Scherübl; Austria	1:49.67
400 m freestyle	Gabriele Detti; Italy	3:49.67	Matthew Johnson; Great Britain	3:51.04	James Guy; Great Britain	3:51.84
800 m freestyle	Rob Muffels; Germany	7:59.43	Antonio Arroyo Perez; Spain	8:01.65	Marcin Kaczmarski; Poland	8:02.13
1500 m freestyle	Gabriele Detti; Italy	15:11.41	Rob Muffels; Germany	15:18.82	Antonio Arroyo Perez; Spain	15:21.89
50 m backstroke	Niccolò Bonacchi; Italy	25.46	Tomer Zamia; Israel	25.76	Viktar Staselovich; Belarus; Nikita Ulyanov; Russia	25.88
100 m backstroke	Andrei Shabasov; Russia	55.24	Fabio Laugeni; Italy	55.31	Niccolò Bonacchi; Italy	55.63
200 m backstroke	Joseph Patching; Great Britain	1:59.45	Luca Mencarini; Italy	1:59.66	Danas Rapšys; Lithuania	2:00.12
50 m breaststroke	Oleg Utekhin; Russia	27.57	Ross Murdoch; Great Britain	28.09	Johannes Skagius; Sweden	28.41
100 m breaststroke	Danila Artiomov; Moldova	1:01.60	Johannes Skagius; Sweden	1:01.61	Craig Benson; Great Britain	1:01.64
200 m breaststroke	Marat Amaltdinov; Russia	2:13.15	Ross Murdoch; Great Britain	2:14.53	Irakli Bolkvadze; Georgia	2:15.46
50 m butterfly	Mihael Vukic; Croatia	23.96	Benjamin Proud; Great Britain	24.11	Maximilian Oswald; Germany	24.21
100 m butterfly	Andreas Vazaios; Greece	53.43	Michal Poprawa; Poland	53.48	Albert Puig Garrich; Spain	53.77
200 m butterfly	Matthew Johnson; Great Britain	1:58.50	Andrey Tambovskiy; Russia	1:59.25	Tobias Zajusch; Germany	1:59.78
200 m individual medley	Albert Puig Garrich; Spain	2:00.95	Andreas Vazaios; Greece	2:01.73	Phillipp Forster; Germany	2:01.94
400 m individual medley	Matthew Johnson; Great Britain	4:17.26	Kevin Wedel; Germany	4:21.50	Semen Makovich; Russia	4:21.86
4x100 m freestyle	Russia; Alexey Amosov; Stepan Surkov; Maksim Startcev; Aleksandr Popkov	3:20.82	Germany; Tim-Thorben Suck; Tony Fitterer; Noel Gogler; Maximilian Oswald	3:21.18	Poland; Daniel RZAdkowski; Filip Bujoczek; Sebastian Szczepanski; Michal Poprawa	3:21.96
4x200 m freestyle	Italy; Andrea Mitchell D'Arrigo; Gabriele Detti; Damiano Corapi; Riccardo Maestri	7:19.56 CR	Germany; Poul Zellmann; Tim-Thorben Suck; Maximilian Oswald; Jacob Heidtmann	7:23.19	Russia; Maksim Startcev; Alexander Dudik; Stepan Surkov; Aleksandr Popkov	7:23.79
4x100 m medley	Italy; Fabio Laugeni; Francesco Giordano; Andrea Bazzoli; Giacomo Ferri	3:41.36	Russia; Andrei Shabasov; Aleksandr Popkov; Vsevolod Zanko; Stepan Surkov	3:41.49	Great Britain; Joseph Patching; Sam Horrocks; Craig Benson; Leo Jaggs	3:42.84

=== Girls ===
Games	Gold		Silver		Bronze	
50 m freestyle	Anna-Stephanie Dietterle; Germany	25.40	Rozaliya Nasretdinova; Russia	25.65	Nastja Govejšek; Slovenia	25.68
100 m freestyle	Mariya Baklakova; Russia	55.08	Anna-Stephanie Dietterle; Germany	55.42	Amelia Maughan; Great Britain	55.64
200 m freestyle	Mariya Baklakova; Russia	1:58.59	Diletta Carli; Italy	1:59.75	Mie Nielsen; Denmark	1:59.91
400 m freestyle	Diletta Carli; Italy	4:09.36 CR	Ksenia Yuskova; Russia	4:12.28	Camille Gheorghiu; France	4:12.64
800 m freestyle	María Vilas; Spain	8:42.41	Nikoletta Kiss; Hungary	8:43.03	Flora Sibalin; Hungary	8:45.00
1500 m freestyle	Leonie Antonia Beck; Germany	16:29.12	Lena-Sophie Bermel; Germany	16:32.67	María Vilas; Spain	16:37.25
50 m backstroke	Mie Nielsen; Denmark	28.51 CR	Anna-Stephanie Dietterle; Germany	28.73	Jessica Fullalove; Great Britain	28.99
100 m backstroke	Mie Nielsen; Denmark	1:00.87	Jessica Fullalove; Great Britain	1:01.72	Ambra Esposito; Italy	1:02.57
200 m backstroke	Iuliia Larina; Russia	2:11.07	Iryna Glavnyk; Ukraine	2:12.87	Ambra Esposito; Italy	2:14.45
50 m breaststroke	Margarethe Hummel; Germany	31.55	Sophie Taylor; Great Britain	31.76	Anna Sztankovics; Hungary	31.98
100 m breaststroke	Anna Sztankovics; Hungary	1:08.43	Margarethe Hummel; Germany	1:09.33	Julia Willers; Germany	1:10.02
200 m breaststroke	Molly Renshaw; Great Britain	2:27.66	Anna Sztankovics; Hungary	2:28.63	Sophie Taylor; Great Britain	2:29.55
50 m butterfly	Louise Hansson; Sweden	26.53	Svetlana Chimrova; Russia	26.62	Elena Czeschner; Germany	27.14
100 m butterfly	Svetlana Chimrova; Russia	59.07	Liliána Szilágyi; Hungary	59.91	Christina Munkholm; Denmark	1:00.24
200 m butterfly	Liliána Szilágyi; Hungary	2:10.53	Elena Czeschner; Germany	2:12.10	Rosalie Kaethner; Germany	2:14.45
200 m individual medley	Dalma Sebestyén; Hungary	2:16.09	Iryna Glavnyk; Ukraine	2:17.06	Réka György; Hungary	2:17.20
400 m individual medley	Iuliia Larina; Russia	4:44.70	María Vilas; Spain	4:45.48	Chloe Tutton; Great Britain	4:48.47
4x100 m freestyle	Russia; Mariya Baklakova; Rozaliya Nasretdinova; Valeriya Kolotushkina; Ksenia Yuskova	3:43.12 CR	Great Britain; Grace Vertigans; Harriet Cooper; Chloe Tutton; Amelia Maughan	3:45.18	Netherlands; Amy de Langen; Rosa Veerman; Denise van Ark; Esmee Vermeulen	3:45.51
4x200 m freestyle	Russia; Mariya Baklakova; Ksenia Yuskova; Anastasia Guzhenkova; Valeriya Kolotushkina	8:06.85	Italy; Diletta Carli; Miriana Durante; Gioelemaria Origlia; Francesca Annis	8:11.56	Spain; Marta Ruiz Dominguez; Fatima Gallardo Carapeto; María Vilas; Irene Andrea Lope	8:11.94
4x100 m medley	Russia; Iuliia Larina; Valeriya Kolotushkina; Anna Belousova; Mariya Baklakova	4:07.61	Great Britain; Jessica Fullalove; Grace Vertigans; Sophie Taylor; Harriet Cooper	4:08.40	Germany; Selina Hocke; Elena Czeschner; Margarethe Hummel; Anna-Stephanie Dietterle	4:08.80

== Medal table ==
Rank	Nation	Gold	Silver	Bronze	Total
1	Russia (RUS)	12	6	3	21
2	Italy (ITA)	7	4	3	14
3	Germany (GER)	6	10	7	23
4	Great Britain (GBR)	4	8	7	19
5	Hungary (HUN)	3	3	3	9
6	Spain (ESP)	2	2	4	8
7	Denmark (DEN)	2	0	2	4
8	Sweden (SWE)	1	1	2	4
9	Greece (GRE)	1	1	0	2
10	Croatia (CRO)	1	0	0	1
10	Moldova (MDA)	1	0	0	1
12	Ukraine (UKR)	0	3	1	4
13	Poland (POL)	0	1	2	3
14	Israel (ISR)	0	1	0	1
15	Austria (AUT)	0	0	1	1
15	Belarus (BLR)	0	0	1	1
15	France (FRA)	0	0	1	1
15	Georgia (GEO)	0	0	1	1
15	Lithuania (LTU)	0	0	1	1
15	Netherlands (NED)	0	0	1	1
15	Slovenia (SLO)	0	0	1	1
Totals (21 entries)		40	40	41	121

== Participating countries ==
43 countries will take part in 2011 European Junior Swimming Championships with total of 486 swimmers.
