= Swimming at the 2014 Summer Youth Olympics – Girls' 50 metre breaststroke =

Girls' 50 metre breaststroke at the 2014 Summer Youth Olympics
- Venue: Nanjing Olympic Sports Centre
- Dates: 17 August(heats, semifinals); 18 August (final)
- Competitors: 32 from 30 nations
- Winning time: 30.14

Medalists
gold medal	Rūta Meilutytė	Lithuania
silver medal	Julia Willers	Great Britain
bronze medal	Anna Sztankovics	Hungary

The girls' 50 metre breaststroke event in swimming at the 2014 Summer Youth Olympics took place on 17–18 August at the Nanjing Olympic Sports Centre in Nanjing, China.

== Results ==
=== Heats ===
The heats were held at 10:21.

Rank	Heat	Lane	Name	Nationality	Time	Notes
1	4	4	Anna Sztankovics	Hungary	32.02	Q
2	4	5	Dalma Sebestyén	Hungary	32.09	Q
3	5	4	Rūta Meilutytė	Lithuania	32.11	Q
4	4	6	Georgina Evans	Great Britain	32.17	Q
5	3	4	Julia Willers	Germany	32.19	Q
5	5	3	Dominika Sztandera	Poland	32.19	Q
7	3	5	Yang Ji-won	South Korea	32.31	Q
8	3	7	Silja Känsäkoski	Finland	32.38	Q
8	5	2	Sophie Hansson	Sweden	32.38	Q
10	3	2	He Yun	China	32.40	Q
11	5	1	Ella Bond	Australia	32.45	Q
12	5	8	Lisa Mamie	Switzerland	32.51	Q
13	3	6	Anastasiya Malyavina	Ukraine	32.55	Q
13	5	5	Jessica Billquist	Sweden	32.55	Q
15	4	7	Karleen Kersa	Estonia	32.66	Q
16	5	7	Samantha Yeo	Singapore	32.69	Q
17	4	3	Alina Zmushka	Belarus	32.71	
18	3	3	Justine MacFarlane	South Africa	32.85	
19	4	8	Sofie Reisænen	Norway	33.08	
20	4	2	Chloé Cazier	France	33.27	
21	2	4	Dana Kolidzeja	Latvia	33.28	
22	4	1	Huang Wen-chi	Chinese Taipei	33.31	
23	2	2	Florina Ilie	Romania	33.39	
24	3	8	Laura Morley	Bahamas	33.47	
25	3	1	Jamie Yeung	Hong Kong	33.48	
26	2	3	Georgiya Kadoglu	Bulgaria	34.35	
27	2	5	Dearbhail McNamara	Ireland	35.17	
28	2	7	Carolina Di Lorenzi	Uruguay	35.26	
29	1	4	Carmen Guerra	Nicaragua	35.37	
30	2	6	Barbara Vali-Skelton	Papua New Guinea	36.80	
31	1	5	Sabrina Kassam	Tanzania	44.30	
32	1	3	Shayma Farhan	Palestine	47.91	
	5	6	Mihaela Bat	Moldova	DNS	

=== Semifinals ===
The semifinals were held at 18:07.

Rank	Heat	Lane	Name	Nationality	Time	Notes
1	2	5	Rūta Meilutytė	Lithuania	31.67	Q
2	2	3	Julia Willers	Germany	31.94	Q
3	2	4	Anna Sztankovics	Hungary	32.01	Q
4	2	2	Sophie Hansson	Sweden	32.02	Q
5	2	1	Anastasiya Malyavina	Ukraine	32.03	Q
6	2	6	Yang Ji-won	South Korea	32.22	Q
7	1	4	Dalma Sebestyén	Hungary	32.27	Q
7	1	5	Georgina Evans	Great Britain	32.27	Q
9	1	3	Dominika Sztandera	Poland	32.29	
10	2	7	Ella Bond	Australia	32.31	
11	1	2	He Yun	China	32.32	
12	1	6	Silja Känsäkoski	Finland	32.43	
13	1	1	Jessica Billquist	Sweden	32.73	
14	2	8	Karleen Kersa	Estonia	32.82	
15	1	8	Samantha Yeo	Singapore	33.07	
16	1	7	Lisa Mamie	Switzerland	33.16	

=== Final ===
The final was held at 18:14.

Rank	Lane	Name	Nationality	Time	Notes
1st place, gold medalist(s)	4	Rūta Meilutytė	Lithuania	30.14	
2nd place, silver medalist(s)	5	Julia Willers	Germany	31.78	
3rd place, bronze medalist(s)	3	Anna Sztankovics	Hungary	31.84	
4	2	Anastasiya Malyavina	Ukraine	31.89	
5	6	Sophie Hansson	Sweden	32.01	
6	8	Georgina Evans	Great Britain	32.03	
7	7	Yang Ji-won	South Korea	32.14	
8	1	Dalma Sebestyén	Hungary	32.42	
