= Swimming at the 2014 Summer Youth Olympics – Girls' 100 metre breaststroke =

Girls' 100 metre breaststroke at the 2014 Summer Youth Olympics
- Venue: Nanjing Olympic Sports Centre
- Dates: 19 August (heats, semifinals); 20 August (final)
- Competitors: 29 from 27 nations
- Winning time: 1:05.39

Medalists
gold medal	Rūta Meilutytė	Lithuania
silver medal	He Yun	China
bronze medal	Anastasiya Malyavina	Ukraine

The girls' 100 metre breaststroke event in swimming at the 2014 Summer Youth Olympics took place on 19 and 20 August at the Nanjing Olympic Sports Centre in Nanjing, China.

== Results ==
=== Heats ===
The heats were held at 10:15.

Rank	Heat	Lane	Name	Nationality	Time	Notes
1	2	5	Anastasiya Malyavina	Ukraine	1:08.91	Q
2	4	4	Rūta Meilutytė	Lithuania	1:08.97	Q
3	3	6	Silja Känsäkoski	Finland	1:09.23	Q
4	3	4	He Yun	China	1:09.51	Q
5	3	5	Georgina Evans	Great Britain	1:09.59	Q
6	4	3	Anna Sztankovics	Hungary	1:09.68	Q
7	4	5	Julia Willers	Germany	1:10.16	Q
8	4	2	Dalma Sebestyén	Hungary	1:10.44	Q
8	4	1	Lisa Mamie	Switzerland	1:10.44	Q
10	4	6	Dominika Sztandera	Poland	1:10.73	Q
11	3	7	Alina Zmushka	Belarus	1:10.81	Q
12	2	4	Yang Ji-won	South Korea	1:10.96	Q
13	3	2	Sophie Hansson	Sweden	1:11.32	Q
14	3	3	Justine MacFarlane	South Africa	1:11.37	Q
15	4	7	Kelsey Wog	Canada	1:11.67	Q
16	2	2	Samantha Yeo	Singapore	1:11.98	Q
17	2	6	Jessica Billquist	Sweden	1:12.06	
18	2	3	Ella Bond	Australia	1:12.07	
19	4	8	Florina Ilie	Romania	1:12.26	
20	3	8	Karleen Kersa	Estonia	1:13.04	
21	3	1	Jamie Yeung	Hong Kong	1:13.46	
22	1	4	Dana Kolidzeja	Latvia	1:13.79	
23	2	1	Dearbhail McNamara	Ireland	1:13.79	
24	2	8	Thereza Banzer	Liechtenstein	1:14.26	
25	2	7	Chloé Cazier	France	1:14.46	
26	1	3	Carolina Di Lorenzi	Uruguay	1:16.03	
27	1	6	Carmen Guerra	Nicaragua	1:18.09	
28	1	2	Gabriella John	Antigua and Barbuda	1:19.65	
29	1	5	Barbara Vali-Skelton	Papua New Guinea	1:20.25	

=== Semifinals ===
The semifinals were held at 18:45.

Rank	Heat	Lane	Name	Nationality	Time	Notes
1	1	4	Rūta Meilutytė	Lithuania	1:07.83	Q
2	1	5	He Yun	China	1:08.47	Q
3	2	4	Anastasiya Malyavina	Ukraine	1:08.71	Q
4	2	5	Silja Känsäkoski	Finland	1:08.82	Q
5	1	6	Dalma Sebestyén	Hungary	1:09.58	Q
6	2	3	Georgina Evans	Great Britain	1:09.80	Q
7	2	6	Julia Willers	Germany	1:09.82	Q
8	1	3	Anna Sztankovics	Hungary	1:09.84	Q
9	1	7	Yang Ji-won	South Korea	1:10.43	
9	1	2	Dominika Sztandera	Poland	1:10.43	
11	2	1	Sophie Hansson	Sweden	1:10.49	
12	1	1	Justine MacFarlane	South Africa	1:10.55	
13	2	8	Kelsey Wog	Canada	1:10.60	
14	2	7	Alina Zmushka	Belarus	1:10.70	
15	2	2	Lisa Mamie	Switzerland	1:10.87	
16	1	8	Samantha Yeo	Singapore	1:11.46	

=== Final ===
The final was held at 18:14.

Rank	Lane	Name	Nationality	Time	Notes
1st place, gold medalist(s)	4	Rūta Meilutytė	Lithuania	1:05.39	
2nd place, silver medalist(s)	5	He Yun	China	1:07.49	
3rd place, bronze medalist(s)	3	Anastasiya Malyavina	Ukraine	1:08.16	
4	8	Anna Sztankovics	Hungary	1:08.66	
5	6	Silja Känsäkoski	Finland	1:09.30	
6	7	Georgina Evans	Great Britain	1:09.69	
7	2	Dalma Sebestyén	Hungary	1:09.71	
8	1	Julia Willers	Germany	1:09.98	
