= 2013 FINA World Junior Swimming Championships =

Fourth iteration of the World Junior Swimming Championships

- Host city: Dubai, United Arab Emirates
- Date: August 26–31, 2013

The 4th FINA World Junior Swimming Championships, were held on August 26–31, 2013, in Dubai, United Arab Emirates.

== Medal table ==
Rank	Nation	Gold	Silver	Bronze	Total
1	Australia (AUS)	10	6	2	18
2	Russia (RUS)	9	8	9	26
3	United States (USA)	9	7	12	28
4	Lithuania (LTU)	4	3	0	7
5	Japan (JPN)	2	3	5	10
6	Italy (ITA)	2	1	3	6
7	Great Britain (GBR)	1	4	2	7
8	Ukraine (UKR)	1	2	1	4
9	Greece (GRE)	1	0	1	2
9	Hong Kong (HKG)	1	0	1	2
11	New Zealand (NZL)	1	0	0	1
11	Slovenia (SLO)	1	0	0	1
13	Hungary (HUN)	0	3	0	3
14	Czech Republic (CZE)	0	2	2	4
15	Brazil (BRA)	0	1	0	1
15	Germany (GER)	0	1	0	1
15	Trinidad and Tobago (TRI)	0	1	0	1
18	Canada (CAN)	0	0	2	2
18	Poland (POL)	0	0	2	2
20	South Africa (RSA)	0	0	1	1
Totals (20 entries)		42	42	43	127

== Medal summary ==
=== Boys' events ===
Event	Gold		Silver		Bronze	
Boys' freestyle
50 m	Luke Percy; Australia	22.14	Evgeny Sedov; Russia	22.19	Caeleb Dressel; United States	22.22
100 m	Caeleb Dressel; United States	48.97; CR	Luke Percy; Australia	49.06	Evgeny Sedov; Russia	49.47
200 m	Mack Horton; Australia	1:47.55; CR	James Guy; United Kingdom	1:48.18	Andrea Mitchel D'Arrigo; Italy	1:48.28
400 m	Mack Horton; Australia	3:47.12; CR	James Guy; United Kingdom	3:48.05	Jan Micka; Czech Republic	3:48.32
800 m	Mack Horton; Australia	7:45.67; CR	Jan Micka; Czech Republic	7:56.33	Pawel Furtek; Poland	7:58.33
1500 m	Mack Horton; Australia	14:56.60; CR	Jan Micka; Czech Republic	15:08.43	Pawel Furtek; Poland	15:17.48
Boys' backstroke
50 m	Grigory Tarasevich; Russia	25.44; CR	Carl Louis Schwarz; Germany	25.76	Michail Kontizas; Greece	25.90
100 m	Apostolos Christou; Greece	54.87; CR	Danas Rapšys; Lithuania	55.24	Grigory Tarasevich; Russia	55.33
200 m	Luca Mencarini; Italy	1:57.92; CR	Keita Sunama; Japan	1:58.21	Connor Green; United States	1:58.42
Boys' breaststroke
50 m	Peter John Stevens; Slovenia	27.98	Kohei Goto; Japan	28.09	Vsevolod Zanko; Russia	28.18
100 m	Ilya Khomenko; Russia	1:00.88; CR	Vsevolod Zanko; Russia	1:01.10	Kohei Goto; Japan	1:01.39
200 m	Aleksandr Palatov; Russia	2:10.75; CR	David Horvath; Hungary	2:11.95	Mikhail Dorinov; Russia	2:12.11
Boys' butterfly
50 m	Cameron Jones; Australia	23.96	Dylan Carter; Trinidad and Tobago	23.98	Takaya Yasue; Japan	24.01
100 m	Takaya Yasue; Japan	53.01	Pedro Vieira; Brazil	53.17	Justin Lynch; United States; Matthew Josa; United States	53.27
200 m	Andrew Seliskar; United States	1:56.42; CR	Masato Sakai; Japan	1:56.82	Alexander Kudashev; Russia	1:58.57
Boys' individual medley
200 m	Joseph Bentz; United States	1:59.44; CR	Semen Makovich; Russia	1:59.50	Keita Sunama; Japan	1:59.74
400 m	Joseph Bentz; United States	4:14.97; CR	Semen Makovich; Russia	4:15.89	Keita Sunama; Japan	4:17.67
Boys' relays
4 × 100 m freestyle	Australia; Luke Percy (49.14) CR; Regan Leong (49.11); Blake Jones (49.38); Mack Horton (49.33)	3:16.96; CR	United States; Paul Powers (49.94); Brett Ringgold (50.33); Kyle Gornay (50.65); Caeleb Dressel (48.29)	3:19.21	Russia; Evgeny Sedov (49.27); Ivan Kuzmenko (49.98); Daniil Melyanenkov (50.68); Sergei Tarkhanov (49.64)	3:19.57
4 × 200 m freestyle	United Kingdom; Matthew Johnson (1:50.88); Max Litchfield (1:49.11); Caleb Hughes (1:48.98); James Guy (1:46.39)	7:15.36; CR	Australia; Isaac Jones (1:49.90); Regan Leong (1:48.96); Jack McLoughlin (1:51.12); Mack Horton (1:45.84)	7:15.82	United States; Blake Pieroni (1:50.74); Joseph Bentz (1:48.61); Caeleb Dressel (1:48.27); Alexander Katz (1:50.05)	7:17.67
4 × 100 m medley	Japan; Keita Sunama (55.47); Kohei Goto (1:00.56); Takaya Yasue (52.20); Toru Maruyama (49.90)	3:38.13; CR	Russia; Grigory Tarasevich (55.57); Vsevolod Zanko (1:00.49); Alexander Kudashev (53.37); Evgeny Sedov (49.29)	3:38.72	South Africa; Christopher Reid (56.29); Jarred Crous (1:01.45); Ryan Coetzee (55.56); Caydon Muller (48.71)	3:42.01

=== Girls' events ===
Event	Gold		Silver		Bronze	
Girls' freestyle
50 m	Rūta Meilutytė; Lithuania	25.10	Rozaliya Nasretdinova; Russia	25.16	Siobhán Haughey; Hong Kong	25.38
100 m	Siobhán Haughey; Hong Kong	54.47; CR	Rūta Meilutytė; Lithuania	54.94	Shayna Jack; Australia	55.23
200 m	Diletta Carli; Italy	1:58.94	Mariia Baklakova; Russia	1:59.51	Quinn Carrozza; United States	1:59.69
400 m	Remy Fairweather; Australia	4:07.77	Alanna Bowles; Australia	4:10.32	Quinn Carrozza; United States	4:11.14
800 m	Alanna Bowles; Australia	8:32.68	Rebecca Mann; United States	8:37.85	Linda Caponi; Italy	8:38.42
1500 m	Rebecca Mann; United States	16:23.89	Linda Caponi; Italy	16:33.62	Isabella Rongione; United States	16:35.28
Girls' backstroke
50 m	Gabrielle Fa'amausili; New Zealand	28.64	Daria Ustinova; Russia	28.71	Clara Smiddy; United States	28.86
100 m	Daria Ustinova; Russia	1:01.05	Kathleen Baker; United States	1:01.18	Jessica Fullalove; United Kingdom	1:01.27
200 m	Kylie Stewart; United States	2:09.74; CR	Kathleen Baker; United States	2:10.68	Daria Ustinova; Russia	2:10.79
Girls' breaststroke
50 m	Rūta Meilutytė; Lithuania	29.86; CR	Viktoriya Solnceva; Ukraine	31.34	Sophie Taylor; United Kingdom	31.38
100 m	Rūta Meilutytė; Lithuania	1:06.61; CR	Sophie Taylor; United Kingdom	1:07.36	Viktoriya Solnceva; Ukraine	1:07.53
200 m	Viktoriya Solnceva; Ukraine	2:23.12; CR	Anastasiya Malyavina; Ukraine	2:27.46	Silvia Guerra; Italy	2:27.51
Girls' butterfly
50 m	Svetlana Chimrova; Russia	26.32; CR	Stephanie Whan; Australia	26.71	Lucie Svěcená; Czech Republic	26.97
100 m	Svetlana Chimrova; Russia	58.34; CR	Liliána Szilágyi; Hungary	58.73	Jemma Schlicht; Australia	59.08
200 m	Katie McLaughlin; United States	2:08.72	Liliána Szilágyi; Hungary	2:09.46	Misuzu Yabu; Japan	2:10.76
Girls' individual medley
200 m	Rūta Meilutytė; Lithuania	2:12.32; CR	Ella Eastin; United States	2:13.76	Sydney Pickrem; Canada	2:14.36
400 m	Ella Eastin; United States	4:40.02; CR	Rebecca Mann; United States	4:40.26	Emily Overholt; Canada	4:42.03
Girls' relays
4 × 100 m freestyle	Russia; Mariia Baklakova (55.05); Rozaliya Nasretdinova (55.35); Valeriia Kolotushkina (55.45); Daria Ustinova (55.55)	3:41.40; CR	Australia; Chelsea Gillett (56.36); Shayna Jack (55.18); Georgia Miller (55.64); Jemma Schlicht (55.85)	3:43.03	United States; Cierra Runge (55.22); Katie McLaughin (55.67); Alexandra Meyers (56.34); Mary Schneider (55.81)	3:43.04
4 × 200 m freestyle	United States; Quinn Carrozza (2:00.35); Katie McLaughlin (1:59.34); Katie Drabot (2:00.08); Cierra Runge (1:59.65)	7:59.42; CR	Australia; Chelsea Gillett (2:01.48); Shayna Jack (1:59.96); Remy Fairweather (1:59.51); Alanna Bowles (2:02.12)	8:03.07	Russia; Mariia Baklakova (1:59.42); Valeriia Kolotushkina (2:01.32); Valeriya Salamatina (2:01.76); Anastasia Guzhenkova (2:02.95)	8:05.45
4 × 100 m medley	Russia; Daria Ustinova (1:01.29); Anna Belousova (1:08.74); Svetlana Chimrova (58.65); Rozaliya Nasretdinova (55.80)	4:04.48; CR	United Kingdom; Jessica Fullalove (1:02.12); Sophie Taylor (1:07.78); Emma Day (1:00.96); Grace Vertigans (54.56)	4:05.42	United States; Kathleen Baker (1:01.10); Olivia Anderson (1:09.62); Courtney Weaver (1:00.37); Cierra Runge (54.67)	4:05.76

=== Mixed events ===
Event	Gold		Silver		Bronze	
4×100 m freestyle relay	Australia; Luke Percy (49.57); Regan Leong (49.59); Shayna Jack (54.37); Georgia Miller (55.21)	3:28.74; CR	United States; Paul Powers (50.03); Cierra Runge (55.66); Mary Schneider (55.04); Caeleb Dressel (48.83)	3:29.56	Russia; Evgeny Sedov (49.68); Ivan Kuzmenko (50.20); Rozaliya Nasretdinova (55.35); Mariia Baklakova (54.70)	3:29.93
4×100 m medley relay	Russia; Daria Ustinova (1:01.42); Vsevolod Zanko (59.96); Svetlana Chimrova (58.30); Evgeny Sedov (49.21)	3:48.89; CR	Lithuania; Danas Rapšys (55.22); Rūta Meilutytė (1:05.43); Povilas Strazdas (54.09); Eva Gliožerytė (57.78)	3:52.52	United States; Kathleen Baker (1:01.80); Joseph Bentz (1:02.14); Katie McLaughlin (59.99); Caeleb Dressel (48.70)	3:52.63
