= Alice Dearing =

British swimmer (born 1997)

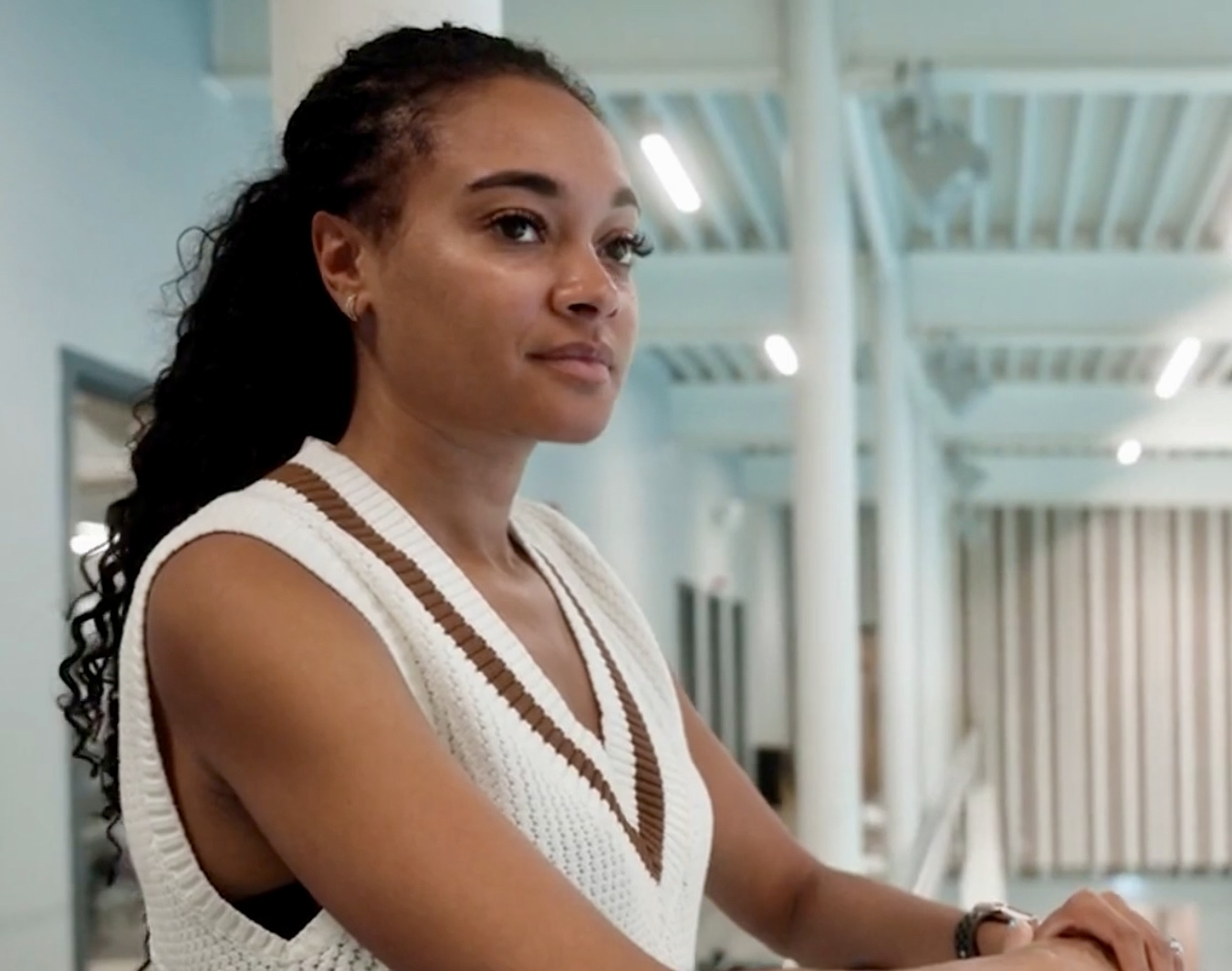
- Dearing in 2024

Personal information
- Nationality: British
- Born: 23 April 1997 (age 29) Birmingham, England
- Height: 1.66 m (5 ft 5 in)

Sport
- Sport: Swimming
- Strokes: Freestyle
- Club: Loughborough University

Alice Georgina Nana Dearing (born 23 April 1997) is a British swimmer, specialising in open water events. In June 2021, Dearing qualified to represent Great Britain in the 2020 Olympics. Dearing co-founded the Black Swimming Association in 2020. The charity was founded to encourage swimming among BME communities in Britain, and has the support of Swim England.

== Early life ==
Alice Georgina Nana Dearing was born on 23 April 1997. Dearing grew up in a suburb of Birmingham and started swimming at the age of about eight or nine. She studied at the Royal Wolverhampton School and was accepted to Loughborough University to study Social Media and Political Communication, and was coached there by Andi Manley. She has Ghanaian and English heritage.

== Swimming career ==
Dearing finished fourth in the 7.5 km event at the 2014 World Junior Open Water championships, and took the European Junior bronze in 2015. In 2016 she became 10 km World Junior Open Water champion, overtaking Nikoletta Kiss in the final 50 metres with a sprint finish to finish 0.5 seconds ahead in 2:04:24.1. This was the first British gold medal win at a World Junior Open Water Championship.

She made her senior international competitive debut at the 2015 World Aquatics Championships. In the women's 10 km event at the 2019 World Aquatics Championships Dearing finished 17th and missed out on qualifying for the 2020 Summer Olympics. Dearing achieved the best result of her senior career to date at the FINA Marathon Swim World Series event in Doha in February 2020, finishing tenth in 1:56.47.5, less than seven seconds slower than gold medallist Leonie Beck.

In 2016, Dearing was one of the 33 people selected for British Swimming’s Podium Potential programme, which was targeted at swimmers that were believed to have the potential to win a medal at the 2020 Olympic Games. In 2018 she was selected with 37 others as part of the British Swimming World Class Performance Programme, which offered members training and competition opportunities and a better level of assistance from British Swimming performance staff.

Dearing competed in the women's 10 km marathon swim at the Tokyo 2020 Olympics finishing in 19th place, having qualified for the event by finishing fourth in the FINA Marathon Swim Qualifier 2021 in Setubal, Portugal.

Having failed to qualify for the 2024 Summer Olympics, Dearing retired from competitive swimming in April 2024.

== Honours ==
In 2022, Dearing was named as a Sunday Times Changemaker of the Year, and received a Sports Journalists' Association award. The following year, she was included on the BBC Radio 4 Woman's Hour Power List. She is an Ambassador for the British Elite Athletes Association, and a member of the Advisory Board for British Esports.

== Achievements ==
Dearing is the third black swimmer to represent Great Britain competitively, following Paul Marshall at the 1980 Summer Olympics and Achieng Ajulu-Bushell who represented the team in 2010. She was the first black female swimmer to represent Britain at an Olympic competition in 2021, when she competed in the 10km marathon swim.
