= Swimming at the 2014 Summer Youth Olympics – Girls' 200 metre breaststroke =

Girls' 200 metre breaststroke at the 2014 Summer Youth Olympics
- Venue: Nanjing Olympic Sports Centre
- Dates: 22 August
- Competitors: 23 from 22 nations
- Winning time: 2:26.43

Medalists
gold medal	Anastasiya Malyavina	Ukraine
silver medal	Yang Ji-won	South Korea
bronze medal	Anna Sztankovics	Hungary

The girls' 200 metre breaststroke event in swimming at the 2014 Summer Youth Olympics took place on 22 August at the Nanjing Olympic Sports Centre in Nanjing, China.

== Results ==
=== Heats ===
The heats were held at 10:14.

Rank	Heat	Lane	Name	Nationality	Time	Notes
1	2	5	Anna Sztankovics	Hungary	2:29.89	Q
2	2	4	Anastasiya Malyavina	Ukraine	2:30.11	Q
3	2	3	Dalma Sebestyén	Hungary	2:30.90	Q
4	3	4	Yang Ji-won	South Korea	2:31.07	Q
5	3	5	Julia Willers	Germany	2:31.72	Q
6	3	3	Kelsey Wog	Canada	2:31.92	Q
7	1	5	Georgina Evans	Great Britain	2:33.01	Q
8	1	4	Justine MacFarlane	South Africa	2:33.14	Q
9	3	2	Sara Wallberg	Sweden	2:34.00	
10	1	6	Dearbhail McNamara	Ireland	2:34.39	
11	3	1	Georgiya Kadoglu	Bulgaria	2:34.45	
12	1	2	Silja Känsäkoski	Finland	2:34.83	
13	3	7	Nermin Balbaa	Egypt	2:35.36	
14	3	6	Ella Bond	Australia	2:35.39	
15	1	3	Samantha Yeo	Singapore	2:35.41	
16	2	2	Phiangkhwan Pawapotako	Thailand	2:35.43	
17	2	6	Sofie Reisænen	Norway	2:35.49	
18	3	8	Laura Morley	Bahamas	2:36.42	
19	1	1	Lisa Mamie	Switzerland	2:37.08	
20	2	7	Jamie Yeung	Hong Kong	2:37.97	
21	1	7	Thereza Banzer	Liechtenstein	2:39.88	
22	2	1	Florina Ilie	Romania	2:42.17	
	2	8	Gabriella John	Antigua and Barbuda	DSQ	

=== Final ===
The final was held at 18:24.

Rank	Lane	Name	Nationality	Time	Notes
1st place, gold medalist(s)	5	Anastasiya Malyavina	Ukraine	2:26.43	
2nd place, silver medalist(s)	6	Yang Ji-won	South Korea	2:27.31	
3rd place, bronze medalist(s)	4	Anna Sztankovics	Hungary	2:27.66	
4	2	Julia Willers	Germany	2:29.68	
5	3	Dalma Sebestyén	Hungary	2:29.80	
6	7	Kelsey Wog	Canada	2:29.89	
7	8	Justine MacFarlane	South Africa	2:32.51	
8	1	Georgina Evans	Great Britain	2:32.92	
