= Craig Benson (swimmer) =

Scottish swimmer (born 1994)

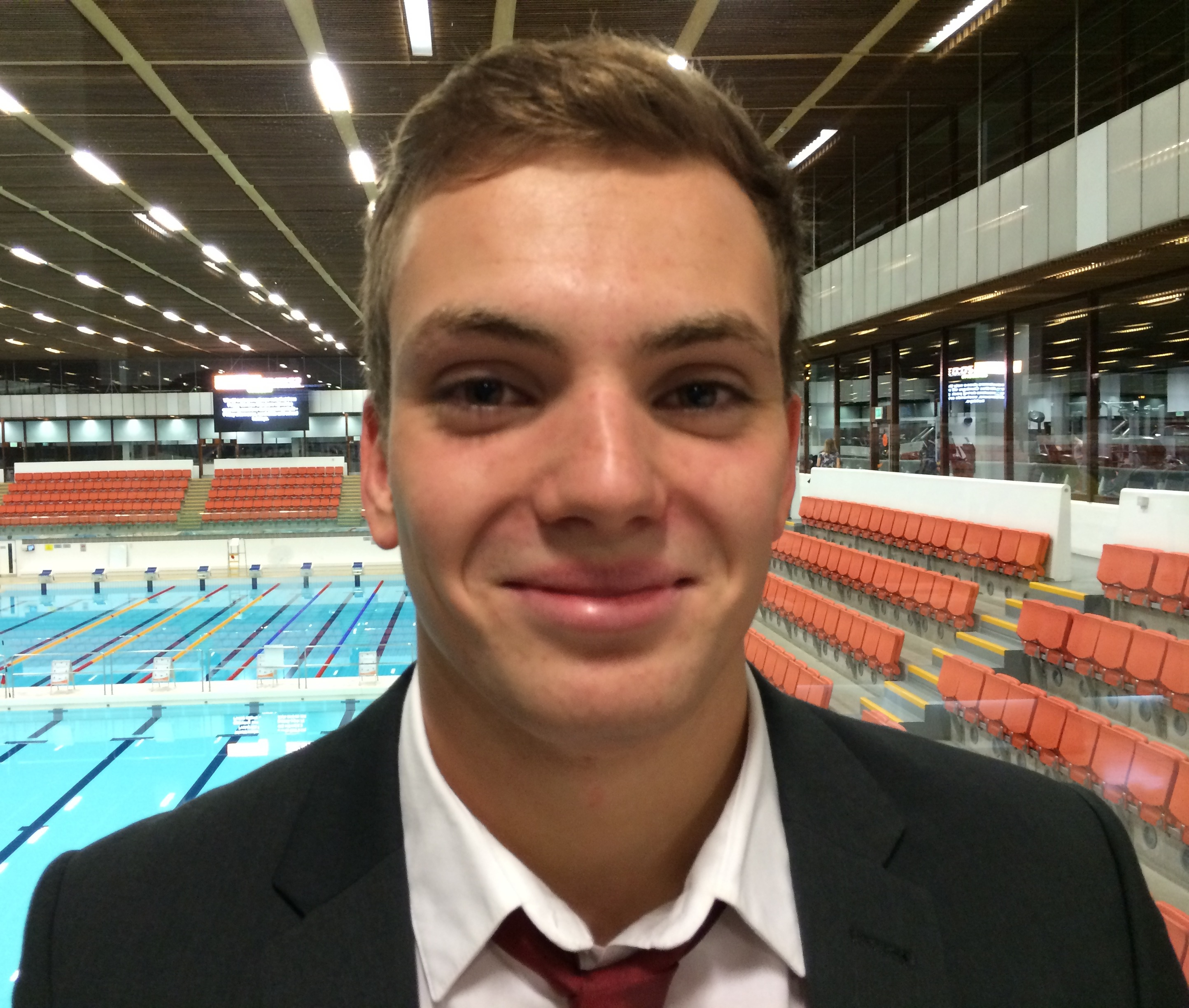

Personal information
- Full name: Craig Benson
- National team: Great Britain
- Born: 30 April 1994 (age 32) Livingston, West Lothian, Scotland
- Height: 1.83 m (6 ft 0 in)
- Weight: 76 kg (168 lb; 12.0 st)

Sport
- Sport: Swimming
- Strokes: Breaststroke
- Club: University of Stirling
Medal record
Men's swimming
Representing Great Britain
European Championships (LC)
Gold medal – first place	2016 London	4×100 m mixed medley
Summer Universiade
Bronze medal – third place	2015 Gwangju	100 m breaststroke
Bronze medal – third place	2015 Gwangju	200 m breaststroke
European Junior Championships
Silver medal – second place	2011 Belgrade	100 m breaststroke
Bronze medal – third place	2012 Antwerp	100 m breaststroke
Bronze medal – third place	2012 Antwerp	4x100 m medley
Representing Scotland
Commonwealth Games
Bronze medal – third place	2022 Birmingham	4×100 m medley

Craig Benson (born 30 April 1994) is a Scottish former competitive swimmer who specialised in breaststroke. He represented Great Britain at the Olympics and European Championships.

== Early life ==
Benson attended The James Young High School in Livingston, West Lothian.

== Career ==
In 2011 Benson, at 17 years old, was selected for the 2011 European Junior Swimming Championships in Belgrade, where he won a silver medal in the 100-metre breaststroke, was fourth in the 50-metre breaststroke, and also a member of the fourth-place 4x100-metre medley relay.

A few weeks later Benson won the World Junior men's championship for the 100-metre breaststroke at the FINA World Junior Swimming Championships in Lima, Peru in 2011 and was second in the 50-metre breaststroke. He holds the world junior men's record for the 100-metre breaststroke.

Benson then won the 50-metre, 100-metre and 200-metre breaststroke and won silver in the 4x100-metre medley relay at the 2011 Commonwealth Youth Games on the Isle of Man. and was named Athlete of the Games.

At the 2012 Summer Olympics, he competed in the men's 100-metre breaststroke, finishing in sixth place in the second semifinal, failing to reach the final. He also swam in the heats of the men's 4x100-metre medley relay. He was the youngest member of the Great Britain swimming squad at these Olympics.

Benson, won a bronze medal at the 2012 European Junior Swimming Championships in Antwerp, Belgium, 0.04 of a second behind the winner, Olympic swimmer Dănilă Artiomov. He also swam in the 2012 European Short Course Swimming Championships in Chartres, France, and was part of the medley relay squad that broke the British record.

He was awarded the Sunday Mail Young Sports Personality of the Year award in 2012.

In 2013 he was swimming for Warrender Baths Club under coaches Laurel Bailey and Kris Gilchrist. Benson was fourth in the 100m breatstrolke at the 2014 Commonwealth Games in Glasgow. Benson moved to the University of Stirling with a sports scholarship following the 2014 Commonwealth Games. He now studies and resides in the city.

At the 2015 World University Games, Benson won two bronze medals in the 100- and 200-metre breastroke events. He also won the 200-metre breaststroke at the US Open Championships, beating Michael Phelps in the process. He won a silver at the 200m Breaststroke at the 2016 FINA Swimming World Cup meet held in Dubai.

At the 2016 European Championships in London, he was part of the team that won gold in the 4x100 metre mixed medley. He swam in the heats but not in the final. He also represented Britain at the 2016 Rio Olympics, but did not get beyond the semi-finals of the 200m breaststroke.

He confirmed his retirement at the 2022 Commonwealth Games in Birmingham, earning a bronze medal from swimming the heats of the men's 4 × 100 m medley relay.
