= Finland at the 2014 Summer Youth Olympics =

- IOC code: FIN
- NOC: Finnish Olympic Committee
- Website: www.noc.fi

in Nanjing
- Competitors: 14 in 8 sports
- Flag bearer: Santeri Sirén
- Medals: Gold 0 Silver 0 Bronze 0 Total 0

Summer Youth Olympics appearances
- 2010; 2014; 2018

Finland competed at the 2014 Summer Youth Olympics with a team of 8 boys and 6 girls, winning one bronze medal.

== Medalists ==
Medals awarded to participants of mixed-NOC (Combined) teams are represented in italics. These medals are not counted towards the individual NOC medal tally.

Medal	Name	Event	Date
Bronze	Mirjam Tuokkola	Archery — Mixed International Team	24 August

== Team ==
Competitors from Finland per sport
Sport	Boys	Girls	Total	Coach
Archery	0	1	1	Ari Tuokkola
Beach volley	2	0	2	Kai Liukkonen
Boxing	1	0	1	Jarkko Pitkänen
Golf	1	1	2	Harri Marjala
Gymnastics	1	1	2	Dmytro Gorbachov
Sailing	0	1	1	Lars Dahlberg
Shooting	1	0	1	Pirjo Peltola
Swimming	2	2	4	Marjoona Teljo
Total	8	6	14	Chef de Mission: Peter Brüll

== Archery ==
Finland qualified a female archer from its performance at the 2014 European Archery Youth Championships.

=== Individual ===
Athlete	Event	Ranking round		Round of 32	Round of 16	Quarterfinals	Semifinals	Final / BM	Rank
Athlete	Event	Score	Seed	Opposition Score	Opposition Score	Opposition Score	Opposition Score	Opposition Score	Rank
Mirjam Tuokkola	Girls' Individual	633	15	(Brazil) Ana Machado; L 3–7	did not advance				17

=== Mixed international team ===
Athletes	Event	Ranking round		Round of 32	Round of 16	Quarterfinals	Semifinals	Final / BM	Rank
Athletes	Event	Score	Seed	Opposition Score	Opposition Score	Opposition Score	Opposition Score	Opposition Score	Rank
(Canada) Eric Peters (Finland) Mirjam Tuokkola	Mixed Team	1286	12	(Slovenia) Strajhar– (France) Gaubil; W 5-4	(Italy) Fregnan– (Australia) Sutton; W 6-0	(Brazil) D'Almeida– (Kazakhstan) Abdrazak; W 6-2	(Philippines) Moreno– (China) Li; L 1-5	(Belgium) Martens– (Guatemala) Romero; W 6-2	(bronze)

== Beach Volleyball ==
Finland qualified a boys' team from their performance at the 2014 CEV Youth Continental Cup Final.

Athletes	Event	Preliminary round		Round of 24	Round of 16	Quarterfinals	Semifinals	Final / BM	Rank
Athletes	Event	Opposition Score	Rank	Opposition Score	Opposition Score	Opposition Score	Opposition Score	Opposition Score	Rank
Miro Määttänen; Santeri Sirén	Boys'	(Saint Vincent and the Grenadines) Delshun–Fraser; W 2–0	2	Bye	(Indonesia) Ashfiya–Licardo; W 2–1	(Uruguay) Vieyto–Cairus; W 2–1	(Russia) Stoyanovskiy–Iarzutkin; L 0–2	(Argentina) Aveiro–Aulisi; L 1–2	4
Miro Määttänen; Santeri Sirén	Boys'	(Uruguay) Vieyto–Cairus; L 1–2	2	Bye	(Indonesia) Ashfiya–Licardo; W 2–1	(Uruguay) Vieyto–Cairus; W 2–1	(Russia) Stoyanovskiy–Iarzutkin; L 0–2	(Argentina) Aveiro–Aulisi; L 1–2	4
Miro Määttänen; Santeri Sirén	Boys'	(Oman) Samiei–Ahid; W 2–0	2	Bye	(Indonesia) Ashfiya–Licardo; W 2–1	(Uruguay) Vieyto–Cairus; W 2–1	(Russia) Stoyanovskiy–Iarzutkin; L 0–2	(Argentina) Aveiro–Aulisi; L 1–2	4
Miro Määttänen; Santeri Sirén	Boys'	(Kazakhstan) Dmitriyev–Polichshuk; W 2–0	2	Bye	(Indonesia) Ashfiya–Licardo; W 2–1	(Uruguay) Vieyto–Cairus; W 2–1	(Russia) Stoyanovskiy–Iarzutkin; L 0–2	(Argentina) Aveiro–Aulisi; L 1–2	4
Miro Määttänen; Santeri Sirén	Boys'	(Nigeria) Morris–Akande; W by forfeit	2	Bye	(Indonesia) Ashfiya–Licardo; W 2–1	(Uruguay) Vieyto–Cairus; W 2–1	(Russia) Stoyanovskiy–Iarzutkin; L 0–2	(Argentina) Aveiro–Aulisi; L 1–2	4

== Boxing ==
Finland qualified one boxer based on its performance at the 2014 AIBA Youth World Championships

=== Boys ===
Athlete	Event	Preliminaries	Semifinals	Final / RM	Rank
Athlete	Event	Opposition Result	Opposition Result	Opposition Result	Rank
Kalle Kallioinen	-75 kg	(Uzbekistan) Kozimbek Mardonov; L 0–3	Did not advance	Bout for 5th Place (Australia) Satali Tevi-Fuimaono; L 0–3	6

== Golf ==
Finland qualified one team of two athletes based on the 8 June 2014 IGF Combined World Amateur Golf Rankings.

=== Individual ===
Athlete	Event	Round 1		Round 2		Round 3		Total	
Athlete	Event	Score (to par)	Rank	Score (to par)	Rank	Score (to par)	Rank	Score (to par)	Rank
Oliver Lindell	Boys	73 (+1)	19	72 (0)	9	67 (–5)	3	212 (–4)	5
Sandra Salonen	Girls	76 (+4)	22	76 (+4)	23	77 (+5)	20	229 (+13)	22

=== Team ===
Athletes	Event	Round 1 (Fourball)		Round 2 (Foursome)		Round 3 (Individual Stroke)				Total	
Athletes	Event	Score	Rank	Score	Rank	Boy	Girl	Total	Rank	Score	Rank
Oliver Lindell; Sandra Salonen	Mixed	72	25	79	29	+5	-5	144	12	295	24

== Gymnastics ==
=== Artistic Gymnastics ===
Finland qualified one athlete based on its performance at the 2014 European MAG Championships and another athlete based on its performance at the 2014 European WAG Championships.

==== Boys ====
Athlete	Event	Apparatus						All-Around Rank
Athlete	Event	F Rank	PH Rank	R Rank	V Rank	PB Rank	HB Rank	All-Around Rank
Emil Soravuo	Qualification	13.200; 16	10.950; 33	12.700; 24	14.100; 9 Q	12.500; 23	12.450; 21	76.200; 20 R2
Emil Soravuo	Finals	dna	dna	dna	13.837; 7	dna	dna	dna

==== Girls ====
Athlete	Event	Apparatus				All-Around Rank
Athlete	Event	F Rank	V Rank	UB Rank	BB Rank	All-Around Rank
Maria Sileoni	Qualification	12.050; 19	12.800; 24	7.450; 38	10.750; 33	43.600; 36
Maria Sileoni	Finals	dna	dna	dna	dna	dna

== Sailing ==
Finland qualified one girl.

Athlete	Event	Points per race											Net Points	Final Rank
Athlete	Event	1	2	3	4	5	6	7	8	9	10	M	Net Points	Final Rank
Alexandra Dahlberg	Girls' Byte CII	1	1	(29)	13	16	20	21	Cancelled			10	82	12

== Shooting ==
Finland was given a wild card to compete.

=== Individual ===
Athlete	Event	Qualification		Final	
Athlete	Event	Points	Rank	Points	Rank
Cristian Friman	Boys' 10m Air Rifle	601.6	17	did not advance	

=== Mixed international team ===
Athletes	Event	Qualification		Round of 16	Quarterfinals	Semifinals	Final / BM	Rank
Athletes	Event	Points	Rank	Opposition Result	Opposition Result	Opposition Result	Opposition Result	Rank
(Finland) Cristian Friman (Iran) Najmeh Khedmati	Mixed Team 10m Air Rifle	821.4	5 Q	(India) Prashant– (Mongolia) Nergui; L 7–10	did not advance			10

== Swimming ==
Finland qualified four swimmers.

=== Boys ===
Athlete	Event	Heat		Semifinal		Final	
Athlete	Event	Time	Rank	Time	Rank	Time	Rank
Jakob Nordman	50 m breaststroke	29.15	17	did not advance			
Jakob Nordman	100 m breaststroke	1:04.86	27	did not advance			
Adam Vik	50 m butterfly	25.34	23	did not advance			

=== Girls ===
Athlete	Event	Heat		Semifinal		Final	
Athlete	Event	Time	Rank	Time	Rank	Time	Rank
Carita Luukkanen	50 m backstroke	30.98	33	did not advance			
Carita Luukkanen	100 m backstroke	1:05.85	28	did not advance			
Carita Luukkanen	200 m backstroke	2:24.40	26	—N/a		did not advance	
Silja Kansakoski	50 m breaststroke	32.38	8 Q	32.43	12	did not advance	
Silja Kansakoski	100 m breaststroke	1:09.23	3 Q	1:08.82	4 Q	1:09.30	5
Silja Kansakoski	200 m breaststroke	2:34.83	12	—N/a		did not advance	

=== Mixed ===
Athlete	Event	Heat		Final	
Athlete	Event	Time	Rank	Time	Rank
Silja Kansakoski; Carita Luukkanen; Jakob Nordman; Adam Vik	4×100 m medley relay	Disqualified		did not advance	

== Links ==
- NOC Overview — Finland
