= Swimming at the 2014 Commonwealth Games – Women's 100 metre breaststroke =

Women's 100 metre breaststroke at the 2014 Commonwealth Games
- Venue: Tollcross International Swimming Centre
- Dates: 27 July 2014 (heats & semis); 28 July 2014 (final)
- Competitors: 38 from 21 nations
- Winning time: 1:06.35

Medalists
| gold medal | Sophie Taylor | England |
| silver medal | Lorna Tonks | Australia |
| bronze medal | Alia Atkinson | Jamaica |

The women's 100 metre breaststroke event at the 2014 Commonwealth Games as part of the swimming programme took place on 27 and 28 July at the Tollcross International Swimming Centre in Glasgow, Scotland.

The medals were presented by Michael Fennell, honorary life vice-president of the Commonwealth Games Federation and president of the Jamaica Olympic Association, and the quaichs were presented by Forbes Dunlop, chief executive officer of Scottish Swimming.

== Records ==
Prior to this competition, the existing world and Commonwealth Games records were as follows.

| World record | Rūta Meilutytė (LTU) | 1:04.35 | Barcelona, Spain | 29 July 2013 |
| Commonwealth record | Leisel Jones (AUS) | 1:05.09 | Melbourne, Australia | 20 March 2006 |
| Games record | Leisel Jones (AUS) | 1:05.09 | Melbourne, Australia | 20 March 2006 |

== Results ==
=== Heats ===
| Rank | Heat | Lane | Name | Nationality | Time | Notes |
|---|---|---|---|---|---|---|
| 1 | 5 | 4 | Sophie Taylor | England | 1:07.77 | Q |
| 2 | 4 | 4 | Alia Atkinson | Jamaica | 1:07.95 | Q |
| 3 | 3 | 5 | Sally Hunter | Australia | 1:08.42 | Q |
| 4 | 3 | 6 | Katie Armitage | Scotland | 1:08.81 | Q |
| 5 | 5 | 5 | Lorna Tonks | Australia | 1:09.03 | Q |
| 6 | 5 | 3 | Tera van Beilen | Canada | 1:09.10 | Q |
| 7 | 5 | 7 | Kierra Smith | Canada | 1:09.36 | Q |
| 8 | 3 | 4 | Leiston Pickett | Australia | 1:09.46 | Q |
| 9 | 5 | 6 | Corrie Scott | Scotland | 1:09.56 | Q |
| 10 | 4 | 2 | Sycerika McMahon | Northern Ireland | 1:10.07 | Q |
| 11 | 3 | 2 | Chloe Tutton | Wales | 1:10.11 | Q |
| 12 | 3 | 3 | Tara-Lynn Nicholas | South Africa | 1:10.15 | Q |
| 13 | 4 | 6 | Molly Renshaw | England | 1:10.29 | Q |
| 14 | 4 | 3 | Kathryn Johnstone | Scotland | 1:10.44 | Q |
| 15 | 5 | 2 | Martha McCabe | Canada | 1:10.56 | Q |
| 16 | 3 | 7 | Laura Kinley | Isle of Man | 1:10.90 | Q |
| 17 | 4 | 5 | Sophie Allen | England | 1:10.95 | |
| 18 | 5 | 1 | Samantha Yeo | Singapore | 1:11.53 | |
| 19 | 4 | 1 | Bethan Sloan | Wales | 1:12.22 | |
| 20 | 4 | 7 | Christina Loh | Malaysia | 1:12.30 | |
| 21 | 5 | 8 | Erika Kong | Malaysia | 1:13.23 | |
| 22 | 3 | 1 | Zara Bailey | Jamaica | 1:14.49 | |
| 23 | 2 | 5 | Rebecca Kamau | Kenya | 1:14.92 | |
| 24 | 2 | 3 | Jamila Lunkuse | Uganda | 1:15.11 | |
| 25 | 2 | 4 | Irene Chrysostomou | Cyprus | 1:15.18 | |
| 26 | 4 | 8 | Niamh Robinson | Isle of Man | 1:15.74 | |
| 27 | 2 | 2 | Savannah Tkatchenko | Papua New Guinea | 1:18.36 | |
| =28 | 2 | 1 | Izzy Joachim | Saint Vincent and the Grenadines | 1:18.37 | |
| =28 | 3 | 8 | Nadia Adrianna Redza Goh | Malaysia | 1:18.37 | |
| 30 | 2 | 8 | Tegan McCarthy | Papua New Guinea | 1:18.52 | |
| 31 | 2 | 6 | Barbara Vali-Skelton | Papua New Guinea | 1:19.69 | |
| 32 | 1 | 3 | Lianna Swan | Pakistan | 1:20.39 | |
| 33 | 2 | 7 | Tilka Paljk | Zambia | 1:20.44 | |
| 34 | 1 | 4 | Oreoluwa Cherebin | Grenada | 1:21.29 | |
| 35 | 1 | 5 | Mahfuza Khatun | Bangladesh | 1:22.62 | |
| 36 | 1 | 6 | Anum Bandey | Pakistan | 1:22.99 | |
| 37 | 1 | 2 | Martha Opiyo | Kenya | 1:23.64 | |
| 38 | 1 | 7 | Aishath Sajina | Maldives | 1:27.93 | |

=== Semifinals ===
| Rank | Heat | Lane | Name | Nationality | Time | Notes |
|---|---|---|---|---|---|---|
| 1 | 1 | 4 | Alia Atkinson | Jamaica | 1:06.87 | Q |
| 2 | 2 | 4 | Sophie Taylor | England | 1:07.20 | Q |
| 3 | 2 | 3 | Lorna Tonks | Australia | 1:07.65 | Q |
| 4 | 2 | 5 | Sally Hunter | Australia | 1:07.97 | Q |
| 5 | 1 | 3 | Tera van Beilen | Canada | 1:08.11 | Q |
| 6 | 2 | 6 | Kierra Smith | Canada | 1:08.49 | Q |
| 7 | 1 | 5 | Katie Armitage | Scotland | 1:08.69 | Q |
| 8 | 1 | 6 | Leiston Pickett | Australia | 1:08.83 | Q |
| 9 | 2 | 2 | Corrie Scott | Scotland | 1:08.94 | |
| 10 | 1 | 7 | Tara-Lynn Nicholas | South Africa | 1:09.11 | |
| 11 | 2 | 7 | Chloe Tutton | Wales | 1:09.38 | |
| 12 | 2 | 1 | Molly Renshaw | England | 1:09.39 | |
| 13 | 1 | 2 | Sycerika McMahon | Northern Ireland | 1:09.41 | |
| 14 | 1 | 1 | Kathryn Johnstone | Scotland | 1:09.42 | |
| 15 | 2 | 8 | Martha McCabe | Canada | 1:09.63 | |
| 16 | 1 | 8 | Laura Kinley | Isle of Man | 1:10.99 | |

=== Final ===
| Rank | Lane | Name | Nationality | Time | Notes |
|---|---|---|---|---|---|
| 1st place, gold medalist(s) | 5 | Sophie Taylor | England | 1:06.35 | |
| 2nd place, silver medalist(s) | 3 | Lorna Tonks | Australia | 1:07.34 | |
| 3rd place, bronze medalist(s) | 4 | Alia Atkinson | Jamaica | 1:08.14 | |
| 4 | 6 | Sally Hunter | Australia | 1:08.26 | |
| 5 | 8 | Leiston Pickett | Australia | 1:08.46 | |
| 6 | 2 | Tera van Beilen | Canada | 1:08.58 | |
| 7 | 7 | Kierra Smith | Canada | 1:08.83 | |
| 8 | 1 | Katie Armitage | Scotland | 1:09.56 | |
