= Daria Kartashova =

Russian swimmer

Personal information
- Full name: Daria Anatolyevna Kartashova
- Nationality: Russia
- Born: July 28, 1997 (age 29) Nizhny Novgorod, Russia

Sport
- Sport: Swimming
- Coach: Valery Izmaylov
Medal record
Women's swimming
European Short Course Championships
Bronze medal – third place	2015 Netanya	4×50 m freestyle relay
Silver medal – second place	2015 Netanya	4×50 m mixed freestyle relay
European Junior Championships
Gold medal – first place	2013 Poznań	4×100 m freestyle relay
Vladimir Salnikov Cup
Gold medal – first place	2018 Saint Petersburg	100 m butterfly
FINA Swimming World Cup
Gold medal – first place	2016 Moscow	4×50 m mixed freestyle relay
Bronze medal – third place	2021 Kazan	4×50 m mixed freestyle relay

Daria Anatolyevna Kartashova (Russian: Да́рья Анато́льевна Карташо́ва July 28, 1997) is a Russian swimmer.

== Career ==
Kartashova began her sports career in Nizhny Novgorod at the Youth Sports School "Sormovo," representing Nizhny Novgorod region. In 2013, at the European Junior Swimming Championships in Poznań, Poland, she won a gold medal in the 4 × 100 m freestyle relay. Later that year, in Dubai, she earned a bronze medal in the 4 × 100 m freestyle relay at the Junior World Championships. In the 2015 European Short Course Swimming Championships, Kartashova won a bronze medal in the 4×50 meters freestyle relay.

She trains at the Saint Petersburg College of Olympic Reserve No. 1 under the guidance of V. A. Izmaylov. By order of the Ministry of Sports of the Russian Federation dated February 21, 2013 (No. 9-ng), she was awarded the title of Master of Sports of Russia. Three and a half years later, at the age of 18, by order of the Ministry of Sports of the Russian Federation dated June 20, 2016 (No. 70-ng), she was awarded the title of Master of Sport of Russia, International Class.
