= 2016 FINA World Swimming Championships (25 m) – Women's 200 metre breaststroke =

Women's 200 metre breaststroke at the 2016 FINA World Swimming Championships (25 m)
- Venue: WFCU Centre
- Dates: 11 December (heats and final)
- Competitors: 38 from 30 nations
- Winning time: 2:18.51

Medalists
| gold medal | Molly Renshaw | Great Britain |
| silver medal | Kelsey Wog | Canada |
| bronze medal | Chloe Tutton | Great Britain |

The Women's 200 metre breaststroke competition of the 2016 FINA World Swimming Championships (25 m) was held on 11 December 2016.

== Records ==
Prior to the competition, the existing world and championship records were as follows.

| | Name | Nation | Time | Location | Date |
|---|---|---|---|---|---|
| World record | Rebecca Soni | United States | 2:14.57 | Manchester | 18 December 2009 |
| Championship record | Rikke Møller Pedersen | Denmark | 2:16.08 | Istanbul | 16 December 2012 |

== Results ==
=== Heats ===
The heats were held at 09:58.

| Rank | Heat | Lane | Name | Nationality | Time | Notes |
|---|---|---|---|---|---|---|
| 1 | 5 | 1 | Chloe Tutton | Great Britain | 2:18.89 | Q |
| 5 | 5 | 2 | Kierra Smith | Canada | 2:19.87 | Q |
| 3 | 5 | 3 | Kelsey Wog | Canada | 2:20.26 | Q |
| 4 | 4 | 6 | Kako Ishida | Japan | 2:20.39 | Q |
| 5 | 5 | 4 | Molly Renshaw | Great Britain | 2:20.80 | Q |
| 6 | 4 | 3 | Molly Hannis | United States | 2:20.82 | Q |
| 7 | 4 | 4 | Fanny Lecluyse | Belgium | 2:20.96 | Q |
| 8 | 5 | 5 | Lilly King | United States | 2:21.17 | Q |
| 9 | 3 | 5 | Reona Aoki | Japan | 2:21.18 | |
| 10 | 4 | 5 | Jenna Laukkanen | Finland | 2:22.09 | |
| 11 | 3 | 7 | Andrea Podmaníková | Slovakia | 2:22.38 | NR |
| 12 | 3 | 4 | Shi Jinglin | China | 2:22.79 | |
| 13 | 5 | 6 | Jessica Vall | Spain | 2:23.34 | |
| 14 | 3 | 6 | Silja Kansakoski | Finland | 2:24.19 | |
| 15 | 5 | 9 | Fiona Doyle | Ireland | 2:24.43 | |
| 16 | 3 | 2 | Martina Moravčíková | Czech Republic | 2:24.60 | |
| 16 | 4 | 1 | Jessica Eriksson | Sweden | 2:24.60 | |
| 18 | 5 | 8 | Ana Radić | Croatia | 2:24.78 | |
| 19 | 5 | 7 | Yu Jingyao | China | 2:25.92 | |
| 20 | 4 | 8 | Alia Atkinson | Jamaica | 2:26.21 | |
| 21 | 4 | 0 | Victoria Kaminskaya | Portugal | 2:26.69 | |
| 22 | 3 | 1 | Kaylene Corbett | South Africa | 2:27.34 | |
| 23 | 5 | 0 | Macarena Ceballos | Argentina | 2:28.38 | |
| 24 | 2 | 5 | Liao Man-wen | Chinese Taipei | 2:29.07 | |
| 25 | 2 | 6 | Samantha Yeo | Singapore | 2:29.16 | NR |
| 26 | 2 | 4 | Yeung Jamie Zhen Mei | Hong Kong | 2:29.22 | |
| 27 | 3 | 0 | Rebecca Kamau | Kenya | 2:30.66 | |
| 28 | 4 | 9 | Daria Talanova | Kyrgyzstan | 2:31.88 | |
| 29 | 2 | 3 | Hannah Taleb-Bendiab | Algeria | 2:33.16 | NR |
| 30 | 3 | 9 | Christie Chue | Singapore | 2:36.31 | |
| 31 | 2 | 7 | Emina Pašukan | Bosnia and Herzegovina | 2:38.12 | |
| 32 | 2 | 2 | Leili Tilvaldyeva | Kyrgyzstan | 2:38.85 | |
| 33 | 1 | 4 | Fatima Alkaramova | Azerbaijan | 2:40.79 | NR |
| 34 | 2 | 1 | Sofia Lopez | Paraguay | 2:42.00 | |
| 35 | 2 | 0 | Cheang Weng Lam | Macau | 2:44.04 | |
| 36 | 2 | 8 | Chade Nersicio | Curaçao | 2:44.74 | NR |
| 37 | 1 | 3 | Kejsi Delli | Albania | 3:07.74 | |
| | 3 | 8 | Phiangkhwan Pawapotako | Thailand | | DSQ |
| | 1 | 5 | Naomy Grand'Pierre | Haiti | | DNS |
| | 3 | 3 | Katinka Hosszú | Hungary | | DNS |
| | 4 | 2 | Sophie Hansson | Sweden | | DNS |
| | 4 | 7 | Jessica Hansen | Australia | | DNS |

=== Final ===
The final was held at 19:10.

| Rank | Lane | Name | Nationality | Time | Notes |
|---|---|---|---|---|---|
| 1st place, gold medalist(s) | 2 | Molly Renshaw | Great Britain | 2:18.51 | |
| 2nd place, silver medalist(s) | 3 | Kelsey Wog | Canada | 2:18.52 | |
| 3rd place, bronze medalist(s) | 4 | Chloe Tutton | Great Britain | 2:18.83 | |
| 4 | 8 | Lilly King | United States | 2:19.34 | |
| 5 | 5 | Kierra Smith | Canada | 2:19.88 | |
| 6 | 1 | Fanny Lecluyse | Belgium | 2:19.96 | |
| 7 | 6 | Kako Ishida | Japan | 2:20.81 | |
| 8 | 7 | Molly Hannis | United States | 2:21.94 | |
