= Viktoria Zeynep Güneş =

Turkish swimmer (born 1998)

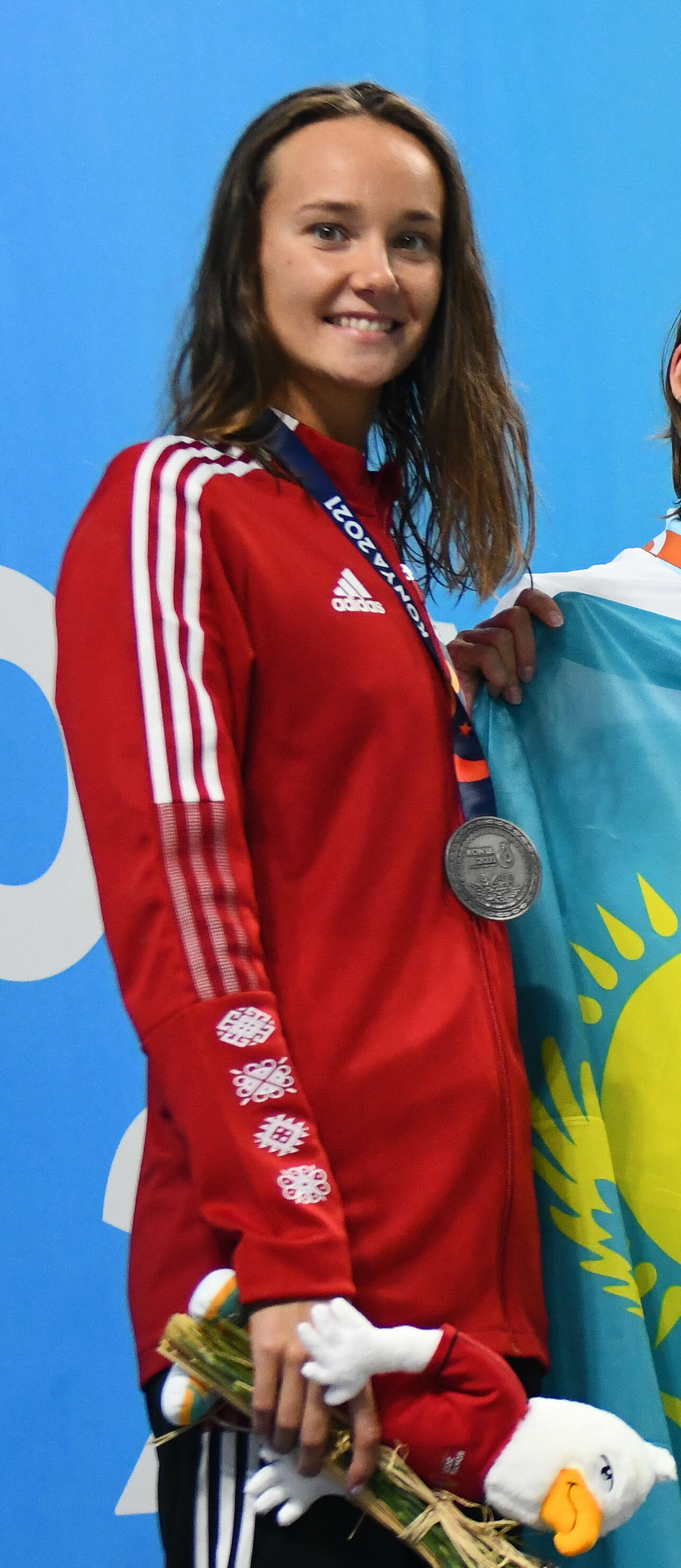
- Güneş in 2022

Personal information
- Born: Viktoria Solnceva; 19 June 1998 (age 28) Poltava, Ukraine
- Height: 182 cm (6 ft 0 in)
- Weight: 68 kg (150 lb)

Sport
- Sport: Swimming
- Strokes: Breaststroke
- Club: Energy Standard International Swim Club
Medal record
Women's swimming
Representing Turkey
European Championships (SC)
Gold medal – first place	2021 Kazan	400 m medley
Bronze medal – third place	2015 Netanya	100 m breaststroke
Bronze medal – third place	2015 Netanya	200 m breaststroke
Bronze medal – third place	2021 Kazan	200 m medley
Islamic Solidarity Games
Gold medal – first place	2017 Baku	100 m breaststroke
Gold medal – first place	2017 Baku	200 m breaststroke
Gold medal – first place	2017 Baku	200 m individual medley
Gold medal – first place	2017 Baku	400 m individual medley
Gold medal – first place	2017 Baku	4×100 m freestyle
Gold medal – first place	2021 Konya	100 m breaststroke
Gold medal – first place	2021 Konya	200 m breaststroke
Gold medal – first place	2021 Konya	200 m individual medley
Gold medal – first place	2021 Konya	4×100 m freestyle
Gold medal – first place	2021 Konya	4×100 m medley
Silver medal – second place	2017 Baku	50 m breaststroke
Silver medal – second place	2021 Konya	50 m breaststroke
Silver medal – second place	2021 Konya	400 m individual medley
Mediterranean Games
Gold medal – first place	2022 Oran	200 m breaststroke
Silver medal – second place	2018 Tarragona	200 m medley
Silver medal – second place	2022 Oran	200 m medley
Bronze medal – third place	2018 Tarragona	200 m breaststroke
Bronze medal – third place	2022 Oran	100 m breaststroke
Bronze medal – third place	2022 Oran	4×100 m medley
World Junior Championships
Gold medal – first place	2015 Singapore	50 m breaststroke
Gold medal – first place	2015 Singapore	100 m breaststroke
Gold medal – first place	2015 Singapore	200 m breaststroke
Gold medal – first place	2015 Singapore	200 m medley
Representing Ukraine
World Junior Championships
Gold medal – first place	2013 Dubai	200 m breaststroke
Silver medal – second place	2013 Dubai	50 m breaststroke
Bronze medal – third place	2013 Dubai	100 m breaststroke
European Junior Championships
Gold medal – first place	2013 Poznan	50 m breaststroke
Gold medal – first place	2013 Poznan	200 m breaststroke
Silver medal – second place	2013 Poznan	100 m breaststroke

Viktoria Zeynep Güneş (born Viktoria Solntseva, Ukrainian: Вікторія Солнцева, 19 June 1998) is a Ukraine-born Turkish (since 2014) swimmer. She represents Energy Standard in the International Swimming League.

Güneş is currently serving a 24-month competition ban due to expire in May 2026 for an anti-doping rule violation for missing three tests in a 12-month period.

== Career ==
=== For Ukraine ===
Solnceva competed for Ukraine at the 2013 FINA World Junior Swimming Championships in Dubai and the 2013 World Aquatics Championships in Barcelona. Solnceva is the current Ukrainian record holder in 100m and 200m breaststroke.

=== For Turkey ===
Gunes competed in the 100m breaststroke in seniors at the 2015 World Aquatics Championships in Kazan, narrowly missing a semi-final birth as she placed 17th. She represented Turkey in the 2016 Rio Summer Olympics, where she reached the semi-finals (top 16) of the 100m breaststroke, placing 15th in the preliminary heats. She swam in the heats of 400m medley 4.41.79 and did not advance. In the 100m breaststroke heats, she qualified for the semifinals with 1.07.14, however in the semifinals swam 1.07.41 and did not advance.

At the 2015 FINA World Junior Swimming Championships in Singapore, she represented Turkey, and won four gold medals. In the 200 meter breaststroke she broke the junior world record with a time of 2:19.64, just 0.53 off the senior world record. She also broke the junior world record in the 200 meter individual medley. FINA named her "female swimmer of the meet".

At the Budapest meet of the 2021 FINA Swimming World Cup, she took the gold medal in the 200 m breaststroke event, and the bronze medal in the 200 m individual medley event. She won the gold medal in the 400 m individual medley event at the 2021 European Short Course Swimming Championships in Kazan, Russia, becoming the first Turkish swimmer to be a European champion. With her time of 4:30.45.4 she also improved her own Turkish record in this event.

=== International Swimming League ===
In the Autumn of 2019, she was member of the inaugural International Swimming League swimming for the Energy Standard International Swim Club, who won the team title in Las Vegas, Nevada, in December.

== Awards and honors ==
- FINA, Top 10 Moments: 2021 Swimming World Cup (#4)

== See also ==
- List of European Short Course Swimming Championships medalists (women)
