= Liechtenstein at the 2014 Summer Youth Olympics =

- IOC code: LIE
- NOC: Liechtensteinischer Olympischer Sportverband
- Website: www.losv.li (in German and English)

in Nanjing
- Competitors: 1 in 1 sport
- Medals: Gold 0 Silver 0 Bronze 0 Total 0

Summer Youth Olympics appearances
- 2010; 2014; 2018

Liechtenstein competed at the 2014 Summer Youth Olympics, in Nanjing, China from 16 August to 28 August 2014.

== Swimming ==
Liechtenstein qualified one swimmer.

Girls

Athlete	Event	Heat		Semifinal		Final	
Athlete	Event	Time	Rank	Time	Rank	Time	Rank
Theresa Banzer	100 m breaststroke	1:14.26	24	did not advance			
Theresa Banzer	200 m breaststroke	2:39.88	21	—		did not advance	
