= Sophie Taylor =

English competitive swimmer

Personal information
- Nationality: British
- Born: 2 February 1996 (age 30) Sheffield, England
- Height: 5 ft 8 in (173 cm) (2014)
- Weight: 136 lb (62 kg) (2014)

Sport
- Club: London Aquatic Centre
- Coached by: Lisa Bates
Medal record
Representing Great Britain
European Championships
Bronze medal – third place	2014 Berlin	4×100 m medley
Representing England
Commonwealth Games
Gold medal – first place	2014 Glasgow	100 m breaststroke
Silver medal – second place	2014 Glasgow	4×100 m medley

Sophie Taylor (born 2 February 1996) is a former international swimmer who swam breaststroke for Great Britain and England. She won a gold medal for England in the women's 100 metres breaststroke at the 2014 Commonwealth Games at the age of 18. She withdrew from the 2015 World Aquatics Championships the following year, and shorty thereafter retired from elite competition.

== Personal life ==
Sophie Taylor was born on 2 February 1996 in Sheffield, Yorkshire. She lived in Harrogate, Yorkshire in 2014.

== Swimming career ==
"After, in my eyes, a disappointing week, I just went for it and hoped that I could get a medal, even if it was a bronze or silver, I just wanted a medal, so I saw the end of sight and I said to myself that I would give it my all and I found a sudden burst of energy. It meant everything after just missing out on a medal in the 50 and not even making the final in the 200, I knew that I had to make a comeback and to get my mind refocused and positive again and so to come off with a gold and a British record means a lot to me".

— Sky Sports quoting Taylor

Taylor trained at the London Aquatics Centre, where she was coached by Lisa Bates.

At the Berlin International Swim Meet when Taylor 14 years old, (in 2010) she swam a personal best in the 100 metres breaststroke, and finished in third place to "show her potential". In 2012, her first domestic "breakthrough" was at the London held 2012 British Gas Swimming Championships, where she finished fourth. She soon performed at an international level, at the 2012 European Junior Swimming Championships in Antwerp, Belgium. This was Taylor's first European Junior Swimming Championships, but she ended with a silver medal and a bronze medal, from the 50 metres breaststroke and the 200 metres breaststroke respectively. Taylor finished in third place in the 50 metres, 100 metres, and 200 metres breaststroke in 2013 at the British Gas Swimming Championships. Later in the year, at the 2013 FINA World Junior Swimming Championships, she won another bronze, this time in the 200 metres breaststroke, but coupled with two silver medals in the 4 × 100 m Medley Relay, and the 100 metres breaststroke.

On 28 July 2014, Taylor won the women's 100 metres breaststroke at the 2014 Commonwealth Games in Glasgow, Scotland with a time of 1 minute and 06.35 seconds, a "massive British record". She broke the previous record, which she had set herself. For much of the race Taylor was just behind leader Alia Atkinson, but a sprint in the last half length meant that Taylor finished first, Australian Lorna Tonks finished second, 0.99 seconds behind, and Jamaican Atkinson third, 1.79 seconds behind Taylor.

On 17 July 2015 Taylor announced she was taking a break from competitive swimming, and withdrew from all events at the 2015 World Aquatics Championships. Taylor has not competed domestically or internationally since that date, and indicated she has retired from elite competition.
