= Johannes Skagius =

Swedish swimmer

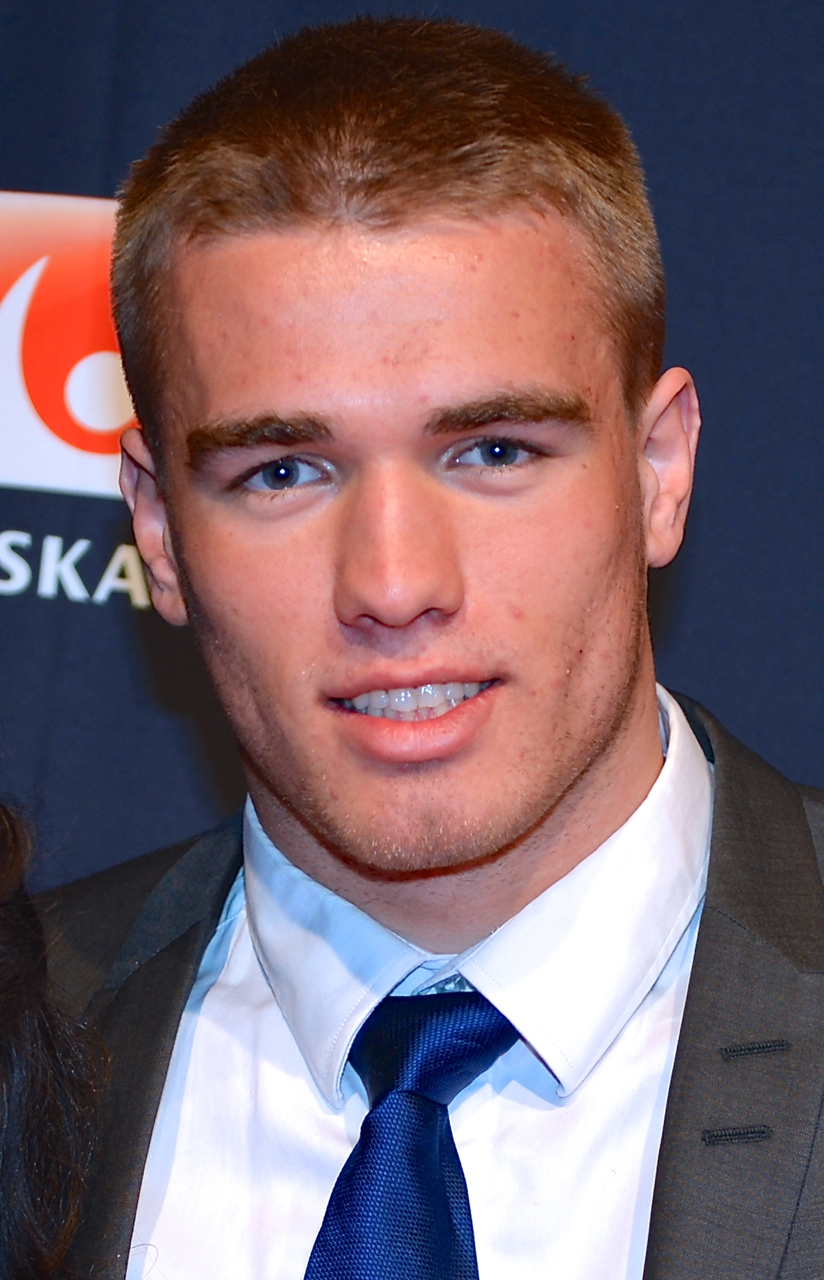
- Johannes Skagius in January 2014

Personal information
- National team: Sweden
- Born: 10 February 1995 (age 31)

Sport
- Sport: Swimming
- Strokes: Breaststroke
Medal record
Men's swimming
Representing Sweden
Universiade
Silver medal – second place	2017 Taipei	50 m breaststroke
European Junior Championships
Gold medal – first place	2013 Poznań	50 m breaststroke
Silver medal – second place	2012 Antwerp	100 m breaststroke
Silver medal – second place	2013 Poznań	100 m breaststroke
Bronze medal – third place	2012 Antwerp	50 m breaststroke
Bronze medal – third place	2013 Poznań	4×100 m medley
European Youth Olympic Festival
Gold medal – first place	2011 Trabzon	100 m breaststroke

Johannes Skagius (born 10 February 1995) is a Swedish swimmer and holder of the Swedish breaststroke record.

At the age of 18, Skagius broke the Swedish record on 50 metres breaststroke in Jönköping in April 2013 with a time of 27.73.
