= Valery Izmaylov =

- Валерий Альбертович Измайлов
- Born: May 30, 1962 (age 63); Leningrad, Russian SFSR, Soviet Union
- Occupation: Swimming coach
- Awards: Honored Coach of Russia; Commendation from the Russian Minister of Sport

Valery Albertovich Izmaylov (Russian: Валерий Альбертович Измайлов; born 30 May 1962) is an Honored Coach of Russia, former coach of the Soviet Union junior national swimming team since 1989, and coach of the Russian national swimming team since 2010.

== Biography ==
Valery Izmaylov was born on 30 May 1962 in Saint Petersburg. He graduated from the Lesgaft National State University of Physical Education, Sport and Health. Izmaylov began his coaching career in the mid-1980s and has since established himself as both a mentor and the creator of his own training methodology for swimmers.

In 1989, he was invited to join the junior national team of the Soviet Union. In the following years, he began developing a systematic approach to athlete preparation, which continues to yield high-level results in competitive swimming.

== Career ==
Valery Izmaylov has over 40 years of experience as a professional swimming coach. Throughout his career, he has trained athletes who became world record holders and medalists at major international competitions, including World Championships, European Championships, the Summer Universiade, and the Youth Olympic Games.

Under his guidance, two athletes achieved the title of Honored Master of Sports of Russia, and eight earned the title of International Master of Sports. His athletes have consistently delivered strong performances at European and World Junior Championships, and several have competed at the Olympic Games and European Games — a testament to the high level of his coaching expertise.

== Notable trainees ==
Several athletes coached by Valery Izmaylov have achieved success on the international stage:

- Andrey Shabasov — Two-time world champion in short course swimming and former world record holder in the mixed medley relay.
- Daria Ustinova — Member of the Russian national team since 2013. Former world record holder in the mixed medley relay. Multiple-time Russian champion and national record holder. Finalist at the 2016 Summer Olympics.
- Daria Kartashova — International Master of Sports of Russia, multiple medalist at the European Short Course Swimming Championships, World Cup stage winner, and multi-time Russian national champion.
- Roman Shevliakov — International Master of Sports of Russia, world champion in relay events, and champion of the 2015 European Games.a
- Anton Nikitin — Gold medalist at the 2019 Summer Universiade and multiple-time national champion.

== Other activities ==
In addition to his primary coaching career, Valery Izmaylov has also been active in business. He has been involved in the purchase and sale of real estate properties, as well as the leasing of commercial spaces. His professional scope also includes organizing and providing fitness and wellness services.

== Family ==
Family plays an important role in Valery Izmaylov's life. He actively supports his eldest son, who is studying at a music college. Izmaylov believes that involving family in sports activities is essential, and that the support of loved ones is a vital part of success in athletics.

== Personal life and hobbies ==
Outside of coaching, Valery Izmaylov is passionate about writing poetry and painting. He is also engaged in developing sports infrastructure, including the organization and construction of sports training camps, such as a facility in Bulgaria used for both training and wellness programs.

== Awards and honors ==
In 2017, Valery Izmaylov was awarded the honorary title of Honored Coach of Russia in recognition of his achievements in coaching. He also received a letter of appreciation from the Minister of Sport of the Russian Federation for his contribution to the development of physical culture and sports in Russia.
