= Antigua and Barbuda at the 2014 Summer Youth Olympics =

- IOC code: ANT
- NOC: The Antigua and Barbuda Olympic Association

in Nanjing
- Competitors: 5 in 3 sports
- Medals: Gold 0 Silver 0 Bronze 0 Total 0

Summer Youth Olympics appearances
- 2010; 2014; 2018

Antigua and Barbuda competed at the 2014 Summer Youth Olympics, in Nanjing, China from 16 August to 28 August 2014.

== Athletics ==
Antigua and Barbuda qualified two athletes.

Qualification Legend: Q=Final A (medal); qB=Final B (non-medal); qC=Final C (non-medal); qD=Final D (non-medal); qE=Final E (non-medal)

Boys
Track & road events

| Athlete | Event | Heats | | Final | |
| Athlete | Event | Result | Rank | Result | Rank |
|---|---|---|---|---|---|
| Coull Graham | 200 m | 22.08 | 16 qB | 22.34 | 12 |

Girls
Track & road events

| Athlete | Event | Heats | | Final | |
| Athlete | Event | Result | Rank | Result | Rank |
|---|---|---|---|---|---|
| Bliss Soleyn | 100 m | 11.77 PB | 5 Q | 11.77 =PB | 4 |

== Sailing ==
Antigua and Barbuda was given a reallocation boat based on being a top ranked nation not yet qualified.

| Athlete | Event | Race | | | | | | | | | | | Net Points | Final Rank |
| Athlete | Event | 1 | 2 | 3 | 4 | 5 | 6 | 7 | 8 | 9 | 10 | M* | Net Points | Final Rank |
|---|---|---|---|---|---|---|---|---|---|---|---|---|---|---|
| Rhone Kirby | Boys' Byte CII | DNE; 31 | 22 | 16 | 9 | 24 | ~~27~~ | 7 | CAN | | | 23 | 132 | 24 |

== Swimming ==
Antigua and Barbuda qualified two swimmers.

Boys

| Athlete | Event | Heat | | Semifinal | | Final | |
| Athlete | Event | Time | Rank | Time | Rank | Time | Rank |
|---|---|---|---|---|---|---|---|
| Noah Mascoll-Gomes | 100 m freestyle | 55.22 | 35 | did not advance | | | |
| Noah Mascoll-Gomes | 200 m freestyle | 2:01.69 | 32 | — | | did not advance | |

Girls

| Athlete | Event | Heat | | Semifinal | | Final | |
| Athlete | Event | Time | Rank | Time | Rank | Time | Rank |
|---|---|---|---|---|---|---|---|
| Gabriella John | 100 m breaststroke | 1:19.65 | 28 | did not advance | | | |
| Gabriella John | 200 m breaststroke | DSQ | | — | | did not advance | |
