= Dănilă Artiomov =

Moldovan swimmer (born 1994)

Personal information
- Nationality: Moldova
- Born: 16 October 1994 (age 31) Tiraspol, Transnistria, Moldova
- Height: 1.88 m (6 ft 2 in)
- Weight: 79 kg (174 lb)

Sport
- Sport: Swimming
- Strokes: Breaststroke
Medal record
Men's swimming
Representing Moldova
European Junior Championships
Gold medal – first place	2012 Antwerp	100 m breaststroke

Dănilă Artiomov (born 16 October 1994 in Tiraspol) is a Moldovan swimmer, who specialized in breaststroke events. Artiomov established a Moldovan record of 1:01.60 to earn a gold medal in the boys' 100 m breaststroke at the 2012 European Junior Swimming Championships in Antwerp, Belgium.

Artiomov qualified for the men's 100 m breaststroke at the 2012 Summer Olympics in London by eclipsing a FINA B-standard entry time of 1:02.30 from the Ukrainian Championships in Dnipropetrovsk. He challenged seven other swimmers on the second heat, including Olympic veterans Malick Fall of Senegal, Vladislav Polyakov of Kazakhstan, and Jakob Jóhann Sveinsson of Iceland. Artiomov rounded out the field to last place by nine hundredths of a second (0.09) behind Syria's Azad Al-Barazi in 1:03.57. Artiomov failed to advance into the semifinals, as he placed fortieth overall in the preliminaries.
