= Anna Sztankovics =

Hungarian swimmer

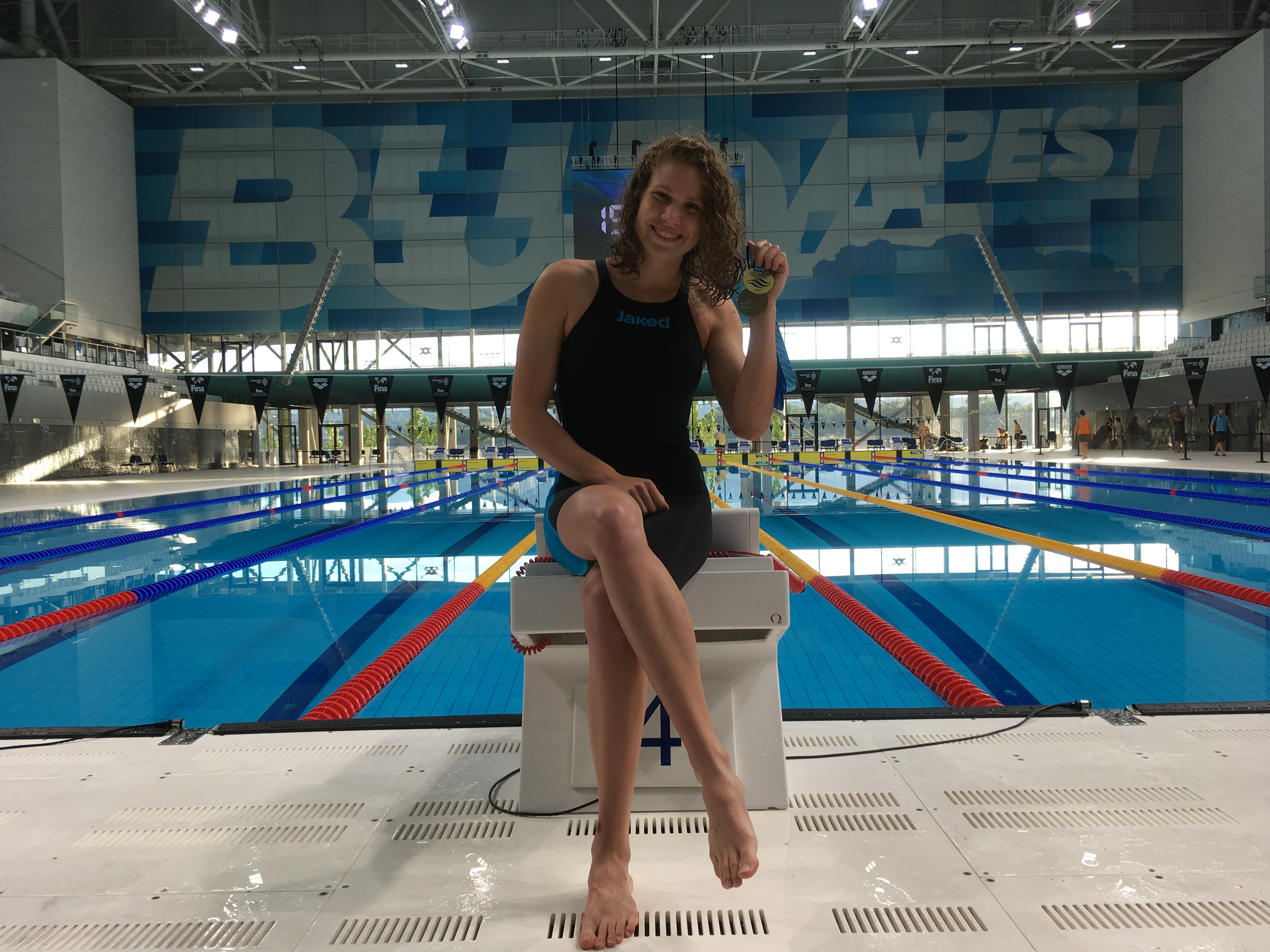
- Sztankovics in 2018

Personal information
- Nationality: Hungary
- Born: 10 January 1996 (age 30) Budapest, Hungary
- Height: 1.75 m (5 ft 9 in)
- Weight: 60 kg (132 lb)

Sport
- Sport: Swimming
- Strokes: Breaststroke
- Club: Miskolc VSI
- Coach: Gergo Szollar
Medal record
Youth Olympic Games
Bronze medal – third place	2014 Nanjing	50 m breaststroke
Bronze medal – third place	2014 Nanjing	200 m breaststroke
European Junior Championships
Gold medal – first place	2011 Belgrade	100 m breaststroke
Gold medal – first place	2012 Antwerp	100 m breaststroke
Silver medal – second place	2011 Belgrade	50 m breaststroke
Silver medal – second place	2012 Antwerp	200 m breaststroke
Bronze medal – third place	2012 Antwerp	50 m breaststroke

Anna Sztankovics (born January 10, 1996) is a Hungarian swimmer, who specializes in the breaststroke events. She is the current holder of the Hungarian record in the 50m breaststroke event both in long course and in short course.

Sztankovics was born in Budapest. She won two gold medals in the 100 m breaststroke at the 2011 European Junior Swimming Championships in Belgrade, Serbia, and at the 2012 European Junior Swimming Championships in Antwerp, Belgium. Sztankovics is a member of Jövő Swimming Club in Budapest, and is coached and trained by Balazs Virth.

Sztankovics qualified for three swimming events at the 2012 Summer Olympics in London, by meeting FINA B-standard entry times of 1:09.31 (100 m breaststroke) and 2:30.26 (200 m breaststroke) from the European Championships. In the 100 m breaststroke, Sztankovics challenged seven other swimmers on the second heat, including two-time Olympian Danielle Beaubrun of St. Lucia. She cruised to second place and thirty-first overall by two hundredths of a second (0.02) behind Slovenia's Tjasa Vozel in 1:09.65. In the 200 m breaststroke, Sztankovics picked up another second spot in heat one behind three-time Olympian Alia Atkinson of Jamaica by less than 0.10 of a second, in her lifetime best of 2:29.67. Sztankovics failed to advance into the semifinals, as she placed twenty-ninth overall in the preliminaries.

Sztankovics also teamed up with Zsuzsanna Jakabos, Evelyn Verrasztó, and Eszter Dara in the 4 × 100 m medley relay. Swimming the breaststroke leg, Sztankovics recorded a split of 1:17.43.

In 2014, she represented Hungary at the 2014 Summer Youth Olympics held in Nanjing, China and she won the bronze medal in the 50 m breaststroke and 200 m breaststroke events.
