= Anastasiya Malyavina =

Ukrainian swimmer (born 1997)

Personal information
- Born: 30 December 1997 (age 28) Kharkiv, Ukraine

Sport
- Sport: Swimming
- Strokes: Breaststroke
Medal record
Youth Olympic Games
| Gold medal – first place | 2014 Nanjing | 200 m breaststroke |
| Bronze medal – third place | 2014 Nanjing | 100 m breaststroke |
World Junior Championships
| Silver medal – second place | 2013 Dubai | 200 m breaststroke |
European Junior Championships
| Silver medal – second place | 2013 Poznan | 200 m breaststroke |

Anastasiya Malyavina (Ukrainian: Анастасія Малявіна; born 30 December 1997) is a Ukrainian swimmer.

In 2014, she won the gold medal in the girls' 200 metre breaststroke at the 2014 Summer Youth Olympics held in Nanjing, China. She also won the bronze medal in the girls' 100 metre breaststroke event.
