= Nikoletta Kiss =

Hungarian swimmer (born 1997)

Personal information
- Nationality: Hungarian
- Born: 29 April 1997 (age 29)

Sport
- Sport: Swimming
- Strokes: Freestyle, open water

Nikoletta Kiss (born 29 April 1997) is a Hungarian swimmer, specialising in open water events. She started open water swimming in 2014.

At the 2011 European Youth Summer Olympic Festival, Kiss won the 800m Freestyle and was second in the 200m freestyle and the 400m Freestyle. She also won bronze in the mixed 4 × 200 m Freestyle Relay team event.

A year later, she won the silver medal in the 800m freestyle at the 2012 European Junior Swimming Championships. and at the 2013 European Junior Swimming Championships, took silver in the 400m freestyle and bronze in the 800 m freestyle.

Kiss won the 7.5 km gold medal at the 2014 World Junior Open Water Swimming Championships, with a time of 1:32:42.27. In 2016, she was runner-up in the 10 km at the World Junior championships, overtaken by Alice Dearing in the final 50 metres as Dearing finished 0.5 seconds ahead in 2:04:24.1.
