= British Esports =

UK esports organization

- Formation: 21 March 2016; 10 years ago
- Founder: Chester King (President)
- Legal status: Private limited Company
- Purpose: National Body Esports
- Headquarters: Sunderland
- Vice chair: Ed Vaizey
- Key people: Andy Payne OBE; Chester King; Tom Dore
- Subsidiaries: Women in Esports
- Website: britishesports.org

The British Esports Federation (also known as British Esports) is the national body for esports (or competitive video gaming) in the United Kingdom. It was established in March 2016 as the British Esports Association to help develop the UK's grassroots esports scene and provide an infrastructure to nurture future talent.

== Organization ==
The association's chair is Andy Payne OBE, who has worked for the Mastertronic software publishing group, AppyNation, Just Flight and is a board member of UKIE, the trade body for the UK games industry. Former Minister and MP Ed Vaizey joined the association as vice chair in October 2017. Andy Miah joined as advisory board member in November 2019.

== History ==
In April 2017, British Esports announced its first game advisers, who provide input and expertise to make sure the association can support and understand each game's community effectively.

British Esports held an after-school esports club pilot scheme for school children at Maida Vale Library in Summer 2017.

British Esports joined Ukie in early 2018, the Creative Industries Federation and the Sport and Recreation Alliance, as well as being a prominent member of the Global Esports Federation.

In early 2018, the inaugural British Esports Championships were announced. The pilot Championships for schools and colleges ran from February to April 2018 and the first full Championships ran from October 2018, in partnership with Twitch Student and AoC Colleges Sport, concluding with finals at the Insomnia Gaming Festival in 2019. Following a rebrand in 2021, the British Esports Student Champs runs in two splits (Winter and Spring) across the academic year for students to compete for a spot at the live grand finals event. The 2022 Grand Finals are set to be held in conjunction with the Confetti Institute of Creative Technologies in Nottingham.

In September 2018, British Esports teamed up with West Ham United Foundation, London Sport, Archery GB and GAME to host an activity week merging esports with sport, including football, archery and Rocket League.

In December 2021, Team Great Britain and Northern Ireland competed in the first-ever Global Esports Games in Singapore. Teams competed in Dota 2, Street Fighter V, and eFootball PES against one another, with the Dota 2 Women's team coming home with a silver medal at the end of the event.

In January 2022, it was announced that British Esports will be opening the National Esports Performance Centre in Sunderland. The campus will act as a headquarters for the organisation, and will allow for further developments to the esports scene throughout the United Kingdom.

In February 2022, it was announced that the pilot for the Commonwealth Esports Championships is being supported by British Esports. The tournament will take place alongside the Commonwealth Games in Birmingham in July 2022.

=== Saudi eSports Federation Controversy ===
In October 2023, British eSports announced a partnership with the Saudi eSports Federation. It was touted as being a collaboration aimed to set "new standards of excellence, education and innovation throughout the world of esports". This would include a variety of endeavours between the two parties, including internships, training programs and research projects.

The announcement was met with a large negative response on social media, with many concerns being raised around issues with Saudi Arabia's poor human rights records . In response British eSports issued a further statement on social media clarifying that "no monetary contributions of any kind were received".

== Student Champs ==
The British Esports Student Champs cover 4 main esports titles: Rocket League, League of Legends, Overwatch 2 and Valorant. Each tournament consists of a Winter Season with initial regionalisation and divisions, and a Spring Season with the chance of promotion into a higher division or the Nationals. Teams can enter in the Spring Season without completing the Winter Season, but they will have to go through the same seeding process to determine their division placement.

Since 2021 the Spring Season/Split sees the introduction of the AOC Sport FIFA Cup, and would normally involve the current version of the game. The AOC Sport FIFA 22 Cup contained two leagues for Xbox and PlayStation, due to the lack of cross-platform play in the FIFA series.
