= Semen Makovich =

Russian swimmer

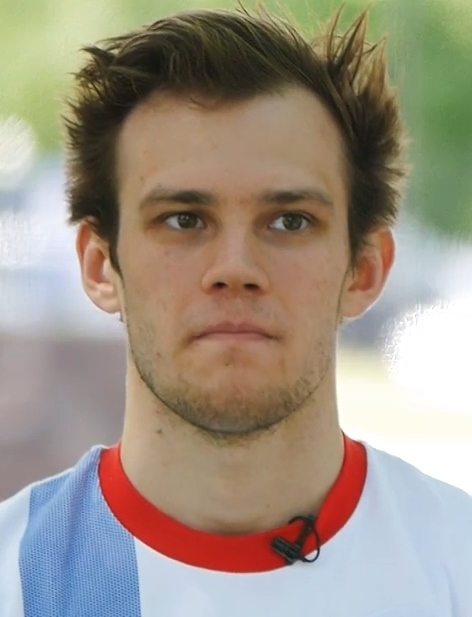
- Makovich in 2016

Personal information
- Full name: Semen Vladimirovich Makovich
- Born: 13 July 1995 (age 31)

Sport
- Sport: Swimming
Medal record
World Masters Championships
Gold medal – first place	2024 Doha	200 m medley
Military World Games
Bronze medal – third place	2019 Wuhan	4×100 m freestyle
European Junior Championships
Gold medal – first place	2013 Poznan	200 m medley
Gold medal – first place	2013 Poznan	400 m medley
Bronze medal – third place	2012 Antwerp	400 m medley

Semen Vladimirovich Makovich (Russian: Семён Владимирович Макович; born 13 July 1995) is a Russian swimmer. He competed in the men's 200 metre individual medley event at the 2016 Summer Olympics.

He also won bronze on the relay at the 2019 Military World Games in Wuhan, China.

He later won gold in the 200m medley at the 2024 World Aquatics Masters Championships in Doha, Qatar.
