= Giorgia Biondani =

Italian swimmer

Personal information
- Born: 14 June 1997 (age 29)

Sport
- Sport: Swimming

Giorgia Biondani (born 14 June 1997) is an Italian swimmer. She competed in the women's 4 × 100 metre freestyle relay event at the 2017 World Aquatics Championships.
