= Chloé Tutton =

British swimmer

Personal information
- Full name: Chloé Marianne Tutton
- Born: 17 July 1996 (age 29) Pontypridd, Wales
- Height: 167 cm (5 ft 6 in)
- Weight: 60 kg (132 lb)

Sport
- Sport: Swimming
- Strokes: Breaststroke
Medal record
Women's swimming
Representing Great Britain
World Championships (SC)
Bronze medal – third place	2016 Windsor	200 m breaststroke
European Championships (LC)
Gold medal – first place	2016 London	4×100 m medley
Bronze medal – third place	2016 London	100 m breaststroke
Representing Wales
Commonwealth Games
Bronze medal – third place	2018 Gold Coast	200 m breaststroke
Bronze medal – third place	2018 Gold Coast	4×100 m medley

Chloé Marianne Tutton (born 17 July 1996) is a British breaststroke swimmer. She won a bronze medal in the individual 100 m and a gold in the 4×100 m medley relay events at the 2016 European Championships, and competed for the 2016 Summer Olympics.

== Early life ==
Tutton was born in Pontypridd, Wales. Tutton took to swimming on holiday, leading her mother to enroll her in local classes. At age 12, coach Dave Haller recruited her, causing Tutton to move to Cardiff to advance her swimming. A bout of glandular fever forced Tutton to take an extended break from swimming at age 16.`

== Career ==
Her first international meet was the 2014 Wales Commonwealth Games where she competed in breaststroke and the 400 metre freestyle, placing sixth in the latter event. Following the Commonwealth Games, a dislocated shoulder forced her to take time off from swimming. She did not qualify for the British team for the 2015 World Championships.

The 2016 season was Tutton's breakout season as a swimmer. She set a British record in the 200 metre breaststroke at the 2016 British Championships with a time of 2 minutes 22.34 seconds. The record setting time won Tutton the gold medal. Her performance at the competition was just below an automatic qualifying time for the 2016 Summer Olympics in Rio de Janeiro. On 21 April 2016 the selectors announced Tutton had made the British swimming team for the then-upcoming Olympics.

At the 2016 European Swimming Championships, Tutton won bronze in the 100 metre breaststroke and placed sixth in the 200 meter breaststroke. She was also part of Great Britain's gold medal winning team in the 4 x 100 medley relay.

Tutton finished in fourth place in the 200 metres breaststroke at the 2016 Summer Olympics. She missed earning a place on the podium by 0.06 seconds. Tutton was also part of the British team for the 4 x 100 medley relay, which placed seventh at the games. As of 2016, her swimming coach is Graham Wardell.
