= Mariya Baklakova =

Russian swimmer

Personal information
- Born: March 14, 1997 (age 29) Chaykovsky, Perm Oblast

Sport
- Sport: Swimming
Medal record
Women's swimming
Representing Russia
Summer Universiade
Gold medal – first place	2017 Taipei	4×200 m freestyle
Silver medal – second place	2017 Taipei	4×100 m freestyle
Bronze medal – third place	2019 Naples	200 m freestyle
Bronze medal – third place	2019 Naples	4×200 m freestyle
World Junior Championships
Gold medal – first place	2013 Dubai	4×100 m freestyle
Silver medal – second place	2013 Dubai	200 m freestyle
Bronze medal – third place	2013 Dubai	4×200 m freestyle
Bronze medal – third place	2013 Dubai	4×100 m mixed freestyle
European Junior Championships
Gold medal – first place	2013 Poznan	100 m freestyle
Gold medal – first place	2013 Poznan	200 m freestyle
Gold medal – first place	2013 Poznan	4×100 m freestyle
Gold medal – first place	2013 Poznan	4×200 m freestyle
Gold medal – first place	2013 Poznan	4×100 m medley

Mariya Valeryevna Baklakova (Russian: Мария Валерьевна Баклакова; born 14 March 1997) is a Russian swimmer. She competed in the 4 × 200 metre freestyle relay event at the 2012 Summer Olympics.
