= Silja Känsäkoski =

Finnish swimmer (born 1997)

Personal information
- Full name: Silja Helena Känsäkoski
- National team: Finland
- Born: 9 August 1997 (age 28) Oulu, Finland

Sport
- Sport: Swimming
- Strokes: Breaststroke
- College team: Arizona State

Silja Helena Känsäkoski (born 9 August 1997) is a Finnish swimmer. She competed at the 2014 Youth Olympic Games and the 2016 FINA World Championships.

== Career ==
Känsäkoski competed in four events at the 2014 Youth Olympic Games. She was set to compete in the mixed 4 × 100 metre medley relay, but the Finnish team was disqualified after the first lap. She competed in the 50-metre breaststroke and qualified to the semifinals where she finished 12th. She also finished 12th in the 200-metre breaststroke. Her best result came in the 100-metre breaststroke where she qualified to the finals, and she finished 5th.

Känsäkoski competed at the 2016 FINA World Championships in four events. First, she competed in the 50-metre breaststroke where she finished 5th in the semifinals. She qualified to the finals of the 100-metre breaststroke along with teammate Jenna Laukkanen, marking the first time two Finnish swimmers competed in the same World Championships final. She finished 6th with a time of 1:05.16. She finished 14th in the heats of the 200-metre breaststroke. She competed in the 4 × 100 metre medley relay with Laukkanen, Emilia Bottas, and Hanna-Maria Seppälä, and they finished 12th in the heats.

Känsäkoski began competing for Arizona State University in 2017. That year, she won the Pac-12 Conference Championship in the 100-metre breaststroke. She won the same event in 2019, and she finished 13th in the 100-metre breaststroke at the 2019 NCAA Championships. At the end of her senior year, she received the Bill Kajikawa Award which is an award given to a male and a female graduating student-athlete based on academic excellence, athletic accomplishment, and service in the community.
