= Vsevolod Zanko =

Russian swimmer

Personal information
- Nationality: Russian
- Born: 30 July 1995 (age 30) Moscow

Sport
- Sport: Swimming
- Coached by: Sergey Zhilkin

Vsevolod Zanko (born 30 July 1995) is a Russian swimmer, born in Moscow. He competed at the 2016 Summer Olympics in Rio de Janeiro.
