= Dalma Sebestyén =

Hungarian swimmer (born 1997)

Personal information
- Born: 23 January 1997 (age 29) Székesfehérvár, Hungary

Sport
- Sport: Swimming
Medal record
World University Games
Silver medal – second place	2021 Chengdu	200 m butterfly
Silver medal – second place	2021 Chengdu	200 m medley

Dalma Sebestyén (born 23 January 1997) is a Hungarian swimmer. She competed in the women's 200 metre breaststroke event at the 2016 Summer Olympics.

In 2014, she represented Hungary at the 2014 Summer Youth Olympics held in Nanjing, China.
