= Egypt at the 2014 Summer Youth Olympics =

- IOC code: EGY
- NOC: Egyptian Olympic Committee
- Website: https://www.egyptianolympic.org/

in Nanjing 16 – 28 August 2014
- Competitors: 83 in 20 sports
- Flag bearer: Sandra Samir
- Medals Ranked 33rd: Gold 2 Silver 1 Bronze 5 Total 8

Summer Youth Olympics appearances (overview)
- 2010; 2014; 2018; 2026

Egypt competed at the 2014 Summer Youth Olympics, in Nanjing, China from 16 August to 28 August 2014.

== Medalists ==
Medals awarded to participants of mixed-NOC (combined) teams are represented in italics. These medals are not counted towards the individual NOC medal tally.

Medal	Name	Sport	Event	Date
Gold	Ahmed Akram	Swimming	Boys' 800 m freestyle	21 August
Gold	Sara Ahmed	Weightlifting	Girls' −63 kg	21 August
Gold	Hadir Mekhimar	Shooting	Mixed team 10m air rifle	22 August
Silver	Ahmed Mohamed	Shooting	Mixed team 10m air pistol	21 August
Silver	Egypt boys' national handball team: Ahmed Abdelaal; Abdelhamid Abdelhamid; Ahmed Abdelwahab; Abdelrahman Abdou; Omar Belal; Mohamed Eltayar; Hady Morsy; Yehia Omar; Shady Ramadan; Aly Refaat; Mohamed Saleh; Ahmed Salem; Youssef Shehab; Omar Wafa	Handball	Boys' tournament	25 August
Silver	Mohab Elkordy	Diving	Mixed team	27 August
Bronze	Seif Eissa	Taekwondo	Boys' −73 kg	20 August
Bronze	Mohamed Shosha	Weightlifting	Boys' −85 kg	22 August
Bronze	Ahmed Youssef	Athletics	Boys' hammer throw	24 August
Bronze	Ahmed Ahmed	Wrestling	Boys' Greco-Roman -85kg	25 August
Bronze	Abdalla Elgizawee	Wrestling	Boys' freestyle -100kg	27 August

== Archery ==
Egypt qualified a male and female archer from its performance at the African Continental Qualification Tournament.

Individual

Athlete	Event	Ranking round		Round of 32	Round of 16	Quarterfinals	Semifinals	Final / BM	Rank
Athlete	Event	Score	Seed	Opposition Score	Opposition Score	Opposition Score	Opposition Score	Opposition Score	Rank
Seifeldin Elsehely	Boys' individual	577	32	Lee (KOR); L 0–6	Did not advance				17
Hana Elshimy	Girls' individual	518	31	Choirunisa (INA); L 0–6	Did not advance				17

Team

Athletes	Event	Round of 32	Round of 16	Quarterfinals	Semifinals	Final / BM	Rank
Athletes	Event	Opposition Score	Opposition Score	Opposition Score	Opposition Score	Opposition Score	Rank
Seifeldin Elsehely (EGY); Eun Gyeong Lee (KOR)	Mixed team	Romero (GUA); Martens (BEL); L 2–6	Did not advance				17
Hana Elshimy (EGY); Atul Verma (IND)	Mixed team	Tatafu (TGA); Mayr (GER); L 0–6	Did not advance				17

== Athletics ==
Egypt qualified 11 athletes.

Qualification Legend: Q=Final A (medal); qB=Final B (non-medal); qC=Final C (non-medal); qD=Final D (non-medal); qE=Final E (non-medal)

Boys
Track & road events

Athlete	Event	Heats		Final	
Athlete	Event	Result	Rank	Result	Rank
Sabry Asar	800 m	1:52.35	12 qB	1:54.18	11
Hussein Sabbah	2000 m steeplechase	6:12.71 PB	14 qB	6:14.93	14

Field events

Athlete	Event	Qualification		Final	
Athlete	Event	Distance	Rank	Distance	Rank
Shehab Ahmed	Shot put	18.67	8 Q	19.17	6
Hassan Ali	Discus throw	52.51	13 qB	56.39	9
Bahaa Abdelwareth	Javelin throw	76.01	3 Q	69.03	7
Ahmed Youssef	Hammer throw	77.51	2 Q	78.59	3rd place, bronze medalist(s)

Girls
Track & road events

Athlete	Event	Heats		Final	
Athlete	Event	Result	Rank	Result	Rank
Fatma Elsharnouby	1500 m	4:59.87	9 qB	5:35.32	18

Field events

Athlete	Event	Qualification		Final	
Athlete	Event	Distance	Position	Distance	Position
Esraa Owis	Long jump	5.70	8 Q	5.70	8
Riham Abohiba	High jump	1.70	13 qB	1.66	14
Amira Sayed	Discus throw	47.87	2 Q	47.13	5
Esraa Happa	Hammer throw	64.98	5 Q	61.67	6

== Badminton ==
Egypt qualified two athletes based on the 2 May 2014 BWF junior world rankings.

Singles

Athlete	Event	Group stage				Quarterfinal	Semifinal	Final / BM	Rank
Athlete	Event	Opposition Score	Opposition Score	Opposition Score	Rank	Opposition Score	Opposition Score	Opposition Score	Rank
Adbelrahman Abdelhakim	Boys' singles	Angoda Vidanalage (SRI); L 11–21, 9–21	Ginting (INA); L 9–21, 11–21	Mananga Nzoussi (CGO); W 21–12, 21–10	3	Did not advance			9
Doha Hany	Girls' singles	Azurmendi Moreno (ESP); L 5–21, 9–21	Solis Martinez (MEX); L 15–21, 18–21	Macias (PER); L 15–21, 9–21	4	Did not advance			9

Doubles

Athlete	Event	Group stage				Quarterfinal	Semifinal	Final / BM	Rank
Athlete	Event	Opposition Score	Opposition Score	Opposition Score	Rank	Opposition Score	Opposition Score	Opposition Score	Rank
Maria Mitsova (BUL); Adbelrahman Abdelhakim (EGY)	Mixed doubles	Krapež (SLO) / Chen (NED); L 13–21, 10–21	Sarsekenov (UKR) / Yamaguchi (JPN); L 13–21, 16–21	Joshi (IND) / Kabelo (BOT); L 22–20, 18–21, 11–21	4	Did not advance			25
Doha Hany (EGY); Seo Seung-jae (KOR)	Mixed doubles	China / Australia; L 15–21, 10–21	Brazil / Ukraine; L 13–21, 10–21	Netherlands / Austria; W 21–16, 21–16	4	Did not advance			25

== Basketball ==
Egypt qualified a girls' team based on the 1 June 2014 FIBA 3x3 National Federation Rankings.

Skills Competition

Athlete	Event	Qualification			Final		
Athlete	Event	Points	Time	Rank	Points	Time	Rank
Nouralla Abdelalim	Girls' Shoot-out Contest	2	26.7	54	Did not advance		
Nada Abdelhamid	Girls' Shoot-out Contest	4	28.1	29	Did not advance		
Sara Nady	Girls' Shoot-out Contest	5	26.8	14	Did not advance		

=== Girls' tournament ===
Roster

- Nouralla Abdelalim
- Nada Abdelhamid
- Raneem Elgedawy
- Sara Nady

Group stage

Pos	Team	Pld	W	D	L	PF	PA	PD	Pts	Qualification
1	United States	9	9	0	0	190	54	+136	27	Round of 16
2	Belgium	9	7	0	2	136	75	+61	21	Round of 16
3	Thailand	9	6	0	3	96	102	−6	18	Round of 16
4	Czech Republic	9	6	0	3	140	106	+34	18	Round of 16
5	Chinese Taipei	9	5	0	4	124	114	+10	15	Round of 16
6	Romania	9	5	0	4	118	102	+16	15	Round of 16
7	Egypt	9	4	0	5	125	127	−2	12	Round of 16
8	Guam	9	2	0	7	77	151	−74	6	Round of 16
9	Andorra	9	1	0	8	76	161	−85	3	Eliminated
10	Indonesia	9	0	0	9	66	156	−90	0	Eliminated

18 August 2014
19:20

Chinese Taipei	14–16	Egypt

Wutaishan Sports Center, Nanjing

19 August 2014
17:40

Egypt	10–19	Czech Republic

Wutaishan Sports Center, Nanjing

19 August 2014
20:20

United States	21–6	Egypt

Wutaishan Sports Center, Nanjing

20 August 2014
19:00

Egypt	11–13	Romania

Wutaishan Sports Center, Nanjing

22 August 2014
18:20

Indonesia	11–18	Egypt

Wutaishan Sports Center, Nanjing

22 August 2014
21:00

Guam	8–21	Egypt

Wutaishan Sports Center, Nanjing

23 August 2014
18:40

Egypt	12–15	Thailand

Wutaishan Sports Center, Nanjing

24 August 2014
17:20

Belgium	16–10	Egypt

Wutaishan Sports Center, Nanjing

24 August 2014
21:20

Egypt	21–10	Andorra

Wutaishan Sports Center, Nanjing

Knockout Stage

Round of 16	Quarterfinals	Semifinals	Final / BM	Rank
Opposition Score	Opposition Score	Opposition Score	Opposition Score	Rank
Hungary; L 18-20	Did not advance			13

== Cycling ==
Egypt qualified a boys' team based on its ranking issued by the UCI.

Team

Athletes	Event	Cross-Country Eliminator		Time trial			BMX		Cross-Country race			Road race			Total Pts	Rank
Athletes	Event	Rank	Points	Time	Rank	Points	Rank	Points	Time	Rank	Points	Time	Rank	Points	Total Pts	Rank
Youssef Helal; Mohamed Imam	Boys' Team	26	0	5:53.37	29	0	22	0	–4 laps	29	0	1:37:29; 1:37:29	24; 26	0	0	30

Mixed relay

Athletes	Event	Cross-Country Girls' race	Cross-Country Boys' race	Boys' Road race	Girls' Road race	Total Time	Rank
Andrea Contreras (VEN); Mohamed Imam (EGY); Nikolaos Zegklis (GRE); Daryorie Arrieche (VEN)	Mixed team relay	4:10	3:27	5:47	6:33	19:57	23

== Diving ==
Egypt qualified two quotas based on its performance at the Nanjing 2014 Diving Qualifying Event.

Athlete	Event	Preliminary		Final	
Athlete	Event	Points	Rank	Points	Rank
Mohab Elkordy	Boys' 10 m platform	359.15	11	386.30	11
Maria Gouda	Girls' 10 m platform	353.95	8	386.35	6
Wu Shengping (CHN); Mohab Elkordy (EGY)	Mixed team	—N/a		374.90	2nd place, silver medalist(s)

== Equestrian ==
Egypt qualified a rider.

Athlete	Horse	Event	Round 1		Round 2			Total	
Athlete	Horse	Event	Penalties	Rank	Penalties	Total	Rank	Penalties	Rank
Mohamed Hatab	White Lady	Individual jumping	0	1	8	8	12	8	8
Africa; Mohamed Hayab (EGY); Lilia Maamar (MAR); Maeva Boyer (SEN); Alexa Stais (RSA); Sophie Teede (ZIM)	White Lady; Figaro; Cornetta; Dominand; Carsar	Team jumping	0; 4; 8; ~~18~~; ~~8~~	4	0; ~~16~~; 0; ~~12~~; 4	16	4	16	4

== Fencing ==
Egypt qualified four athletes based on its performance at the 2014 FIE Cadet World Championships.

Boys

Athlete	Event	Pool round	Seed	Round of 16	Quarterfinals	Semifinals	Final / BM	Rank
Athlete	Event	Opposition Score	Seed	Opposition Score	Opposition Score	Opposition Score	Opposition Score	Rank
Ahmed Elsayed	épée	Pool 2 Yoo (USA); L 4–5; Ogilvie (NZL) Kim (KOR) Abate (ITA) French (CAN)	4	Kim (KOR); L 12–15	Did not advance			10
Mostafa Ayman	sabre	Y Yan (CHN) T Cucu (ROU) K Dongju (KOR) Al-Musawi (IRQ); L 3–5; I Ilin (RUS) B Alshamlan (KUW); L 1–5	7	Cucu (ROU); W 15–14	Kim (KOR); L 10–15	Did not advance		8

Girls

Athlete	Event	Pool round	Seed	Round of 16	Quarterfinals	Semifinals	Final / BM	Rank
Athlete	Event	Opposition Score	Seed	Opposition Score	Opposition Score	Opposition Score	Opposition Score	Rank
Shirwit Gaber	épée	Pool 2 Linde (SWE); L Lee (KOR) Mroszczak (POL) Nagy (HUN) Alqudah (JOR); W 5–3	5	Simms-Lymn (JAM); L 5–15	Did not advance			10
Yara Elsharkawy	foil	Zhao (CAN) Kontochristopoulou (GRE) Lau (HKG) Borella (ITA) Szymczak (POL) Martyanova (RUS)		Massialas (USA); L 7–15	Did not advance			11

Mixed team

Athletes	Event	Round of 16	Quarterfinals	Semifinals / PM	Final / PM	Rank
Athletes	Event	Opposition Score	Opposition Score	Opposition Score	Opposition Score	Rank
Africa; Abik Boungab (ALG); Ahmed El-Sayed (EGY); Yara El-Shakrawy (EGY); Fares Ferjani (TUN); Shirwit Gaber (EGY); Salim Heroui (ALG)	Mixed team	Americas 2 L 20–30	Did not advance			9

== Gymnastics ==
=== Artistic gymnastics ===
Egypt qualified two athletes based on its performance at the 2014 African Artistic gymnastics Championships.

Boys

Athlete	Event	Apparatus						Total	Rank
Athlete	Event	F	PH	R	V	PB	HB	Total	Rank
Mohamed Elhamy Aly	Qualification	13.700 9 Q	10.650 37	12.925 19	14.250 12 Q	13.000 14	12.950 13	77.475	14 Q
Mohamed Elhamy Aly	all-around	13.500	11.450	12.450	14.200	12.700	12.500	76.800	14
Mohamed Elhamy Aly	Floor	—N/a						13.616	5
Mohamed Elhamy Aly	Vault	—N/a						13.599	8

Girls

Athlete	Event	Apparatus				Total	Rank
Athlete	Event	V	UB	BB	F	Total	Rank
Nada Ayman Ibrahim	Qualification	13.500 18	8.500 34	12.700 12	11.800 25	46.500	26

=== Rhythmic gymnastics ===
Egypt qualified one individual and one team based on its performance at the 2014 African Rhythmic Championships.

Individual

Athlete	Event	Qualification						Final					
Athlete	Event	Hoop	Ball	Clubs	Ribbon	Total	Rank	Hoop	Ball	Clubs	Ribbon	Total	Rank
Hana Nafie	Individual	12.500	12.150	12.275	12.500	49.425	11	Did not advance					

Team

Athletes	Event	Qualification				Final			
Athletes	Event	4 Hoops	4 Ribbons	Total	Rank	4 Hoops	4 Ribbons	Total	Rank
Sherifa Bayoumy; Mariam Abd El Hamid; Nadein Gaber; Sara Ibrahim; Hannia Khattab; Zen Saad	Team	11.200	10.725	21.925	6 R	Did not advance			

=== Trampoline ===
Egypt qualified one athlete based on its performance at the 2014 African Trampoline Championships.

Athlete	Event	Qualification				Final	
Athlete	Event	Routine 1	Routine 2	Total	Rank	Score	Rank
Mohab Ayman Hassan	Boys	38.130 12	19.710 10	57.840	10 R	Did not advance	
Ashrakat Ismail	Girls	37.475 10	39.910 12	77.385	12	Did not advance	

Notes: Q=Qualified to Final; R=Reserve

== Handball ==
Egypt qualified one team based on its performance at the 2014 African Men's Youth Handball Championship.

=== Boys' tournament ===
Roster

- Ahmed Abdelaal
- Abdelhamid Abdelhamid
- Ahmed Abdelwahab
- Abdelrahman Abdou
- Omar Belal
- Mohamed Eltayar
- Hady Morsy
- Yehia Omar
- Shady Ramadan
- Aly Refaat
- Mohamed Saleh
- Ahmed Salem
- Youssef Shehab
- Omar Wafa

Group stage

Team	Pld	W	D	L	GF	GA	GD	Pts	Qualification
Egypt	2	2	0	0	57	50	+7	4	Semifinals
Norway	2	1	0	1	60	59	+1	2	Semifinals
Brazil	2	0	0	2	54	62	−8	0	5th place game

20 August; 18:00	Norway	27 - 28	Egypt	Jiangning Sports Centre Gymnasium, Nanjing
20 August; 18:00		(11 - 14)		Jiangning Sports Centre Gymnasium, Nanjing

22 August; 18:00	Egypt	29 - 23	Brazil	Jiangning Sports Centre Gymnasium, Nanjing

Semifinals

24 August; 18:00	Egypt	34 - 26	Qatar	Jiangning Sports Center Gymnasium
24 August; 18:00		(30 - 25)		Jiangning Sports Center Gymnasium

Gold-medal match

25 August; 20:30	Egypt (silver)	25 - 31	Slovenia	Jiangning Sports Center Gymnasium
25 August; 20:30		(11 - 13)		Jiangning Sports Center Gymnasium

== Modern pentathlon ==
Egypt qualified two athletes based on its performance at the African YOG Qualifiers.

Athlete	Event	Fencing Ranking round (épée one touch)		Swimming (200 m freestyle)			Fencing Final round (épée one touch)			Combined: shooting/running (10 m air pistol)/(3000 m)			Total Points	Final Rank
Athlete	Event	Results	Rank	Time	Rank	Points	Results	Rank	Points	Time	Rank	Points	Total Points	Final Rank
Sherif Nazier	Boys' individual		8		6	326			234		6	558	1149	4
Morsy Haydy	Girls' individual		8		8	226			270		3	498	1021	7
Unknown; Sherif Nazier (EGY)	Mixed relay													
Morsy Haydy (EGY); Unknown	Mixed relay													

== Rowing ==
Egypt qualified two boats based on its performance at the African Qualification Regatta.

Athlete	Event	Heats		Repechage		Final	
Athlete	Event	Time	Rank	Time	Rank	Time	Rank
Hussein Aly; Hossam Mohamed	Boys' pairs	3:17.34	5 R	3:20.39	5 FB	3:26.09	11
Basma Mahmoud; Alaa Mohamed	Girls' pairs	4:11.89	6 R	4:08.34	5 FB	4:24.38	12

Qualification Legend: FA=Final A (medal); FB=Final B (non-medal); FC=Final C (non-medal); FD=Final D (non-medal); SA/B=Semifinals A/B; SC/D=Semifinals C/D; R=Repechage

== Sailing ==
Egypt qualified one boat based on its performance at the Byte CII African Continental Qualifiers.

Athlete	Event	Race											Net Points	Final Rank
Athlete	Event	1	2	3	4	5	6	7	8	9	10	M*	Net Points	Final Rank
Khouloud Mansy	Girls' Byte CII	24	25	20	27	23	(29)	12	23	Cancelled		183.00	154.00	25

== Shooting ==
Egypt qualified three shooters based on its performance at the 2014 African Shooting Championships.

Individual

Athlete	Event	Qualification		Final	
Athlete	Event	Points	Rank	Points	Rank
Ahmed Mohamed	Boys' 10m air pistol	551	14	Did not advance	
Hadir Mekhimar	Girls' 10m air rifle	399.6	18	Did not advance	
Afaf El-Hodhod	Girls' 10m air pistol	380	3 Q	137.4	5

Team

Athletes	Event	Qualification		Round of 16	Quarterfinals	Semifinals	Final / BM	Rank
Athletes	Event	Points	Rank	Opposition Result	Opposition Result	Opposition Result	Opposition Result	Rank
Hadir Mekhimar (EGY); István Péni (HUN)	Mixed team 10m air rifle	824.8	2 Q	Babic (SRB); Arellano (PHI); W 10 - 3	Akter (BAN); Babayan (ARM); W 10 - 4	Riccardi (SMR); Milovanović (SRB); W 10 - 5	Russo (ARG); Santos Valdés (MEX); W 10 - 2	1st place, gold medalist(s)
Ahmed Mohamed (EGY); Xiu Yi Teh (SIN)	Mixed team 10m air pistol	746	9 Q	Summerell (AUS); Elzelingen (DEN); W 10 - 5	Todorov (BUL); Downing (AUS); W	Madrid (GUA); Rasmane (LAT); W 10 - 9	Svechnikov (UZB); Nencheva (BUL); L 5 - 10	2nd place, silver medalist(s)
Afaf El-Hodhod (EGY); Urfan Akhundov (AZE)	Mixed team 10m air pistol	751	5 Q	Ernstová (SVK); Kim (KOR); W 10–6	Rasmane (LAT); Madrid (GUA); L 6-10	Did not advance		5

== Swimming ==
Egypt qualified four swimmers.

Boys

Athlete	Event	Heat		Semifinal		Final	
Athlete	Event	Time	Rank	Time	Rank	Time	Rank
Ahmed Akram	400 m freestyle	3:52.02	1 Q	—N/a		3:51.78	4
Ahmed Akram	800 m freestyle	—N/a				7:54.29	1st place, gold medalist(s)
Ahmed Akram	200 m butterfly	2:01.46	7 Q	—N/a		2:02.07	7
Mohamed Khalaf	50 m breaststroke	28.71	5 Q	28.84	8 Q	28.87	8

Girls

Athlete	Event	Heat		Semifinal		Final	
Athlete	Event	Time	Rank	Time	Rank	Time	Rank
Mariam Sakr	50 m backstroke	DNS		Did not advance			
Mariam Sakr	100 m backstroke	DNS		Did not advance			
Mariam Sakr	200 m backstroke	DNS		—N/a		Did not advance	
Mariam Sakr	100 m butterfly	1:04.05	22	Did not advance			
Mariam Sakr	200 m butterfly	DNS		—N/a		Did not advance	
Nermin Balbaa	200 m breaststroke	2:35.36	13	—N/a		Did not advance	

== Table Tennis ==
Egypt qualified two athletes based on its performance at the African Qualification Event.

Singles

Athlete	Event	Group stage	Rank	Round of 16	Quarterfinals	Semifinals	Final / BM	Rank
Athlete	Event	Opposition Score	Rank	Opposition Score	Opposition Score	Opposition Score	Opposition Score	Rank
Aly Ghallab	Boys	Group E Chen (POR); L 1–3	3 qB	Ben Yahia (TUN); L 1–3	Did not advance			25
Aly Ghallab	Boys	Toranzos (PAR); W 3–2	3 qB	Ben Yahia (TUN); L 1–3	Did not advance			25
Aly Ghallab	Boys	Kim (KOR); L 0–3	3 qB	Ben Yahia (TUN); L 1–3	Did not advance			25
Alaa Saad	Girls	Group E Chiu (TPE); L 2–3	3 qB	Ali Salah (DJI); W w/o	Štefcová (CZE); L 1–3	Did not advance		21
Alaa Saad	Girls	Bui (AUS); W 3–0	3 qB	Ali Salah (DJI); W w/o	Štefcová (CZE); L 1–3	Did not advance		21
Alaa Saad	Girls	Trosman (ISR); W 3–2	3 qB	Ali Salah (DJI); W w/o	Štefcová (CZE); L 1–3	Did not advance		21

Team

Athletes	Event	Group stage	Rank	Round of 16	Quarterfinals	Semifinals	Final / BM	Rank
Athletes	Event	Opposition Score	Rank	Opposition Score	Opposition Score	Opposition Score	Opposition Score	Rank
Egypt; Alaa Saad (EGY); Aly Ghallab (EGY)	Mixed	France; Zarif (FRA); Akkuzu (FRA)	3 qB	Australia; Bui (AUS); Huang (AUS); W 2–0	United States; Zhang (USA); Avvari (USA); L 0–2	—N/a		21
Egypt; Alaa Saad (EGY); Aly Ghallab (EGY)	Mixed	Kazakhstan; Ryabova (KAZ); Gerassimenko (KAZ); W	3 qB	Australia; Bui (AUS); Huang (AUS); W 2–0	United States; Zhang (USA); Avvari (USA); L 0–2	—N/a		21
Egypt; Alaa Saad (EGY); Aly Ghallab (EGY)	Mixed	South Korea; Park (KOR); Kim (KOR); L	3 qB	Australia; Bui (AUS); Huang (AUS); W 2–0	United States; Zhang (USA); Avvari (USA); L 0–2	—N/a		21

Qualification Legend: Q=Main Bracket (medal); qB=Consolation Bracket (non-medal)

== Taekwondo ==
Egypt qualified four athletes based on its performance at the Taekwondo Qualification Tournament.

Boys

Athlete	Event	Round of 16	Quarterfinals	Semifinals	Final	Rank
Athlete	Event	Opposition Result	Opposition Result	Opposition Result	Opposition Result	Rank
Omar Ghonim	−55 kg	Bye	Tortosa (ESP); L 2 - 14 (PTG)	Did not advance		5
Seif Eissa	−73 kg	—N/a	Savenko (UKR); W 21 (PTG) - 8	Guliyev (AZE); L 1 - 8	Did not advance	3rd place, bronze medalist(s)
Youssef Khallaf	+73 kg	—N/a	Bayram (TUR); L 4–5	Did not advance		5

Girls

Athlete	Event	Round of 16	Quarterfinals	Semifinals	Final	Rank
Athlete	Event	Opposition Result	Opposition Result	Opposition Result	Opposition Result	Rank
Maisoun Tolba	−63 kg	Jelić (CRO); L 5 - 14	Did not advance			9

== Tennis ==
Egypt qualified one athlete based on the 9 June 2014 ITF World Junior Rankings.

Singles

Athlete	Event	Round of 32	Round of 16	Quarterfinals	Semifinals	Final / BM	Rank
Athlete	Event	Opposition Score	Opposition Score	Opposition Score	Opposition Score	Opposition Score	Rank
Sandra Samir	Girls' singles	González (ECU); L 0-2; 5–7, 2–6	Did not advance				17

Doubles

Athletes	Event	Round of 32	Round of 16	Quarterfinals	Semifinals	Final / BM	Rank
Athletes	Event	Opposition Score	Opposition Score	Opposition Score	Opposition Score	Opposition Score	Rank
Sandra Samir (EGY); Lesedi Sheya Jacobs (NAM)	Girls' doubles	—N/a	Giangreco Campiz (PAR); González (ECU); L 0-2; 3–6, 5–7	Did not advance			9
Sandra Samir (EGY); Lloys Harris (RSA)	Mixed doubles	Kalinina (UKR); Rogan (MNE); W 2-0; 6–2, 6–4	Giangreco (PAR); Zormann (BRA); L 1-2; 7–5, 3–6, [5–10]	Did not advance			9

== Triathlon ==
Egypt qualified two athletes based on its performance at the 2014 African Youth Olympic Games Qualifier.

Individual

Athlete	Event	Swim (750m)	Trans 1	Bike (20 km)	Trans 2	Run (5 km)	Total Time	Rank
Khaled Essam	Boys	09:46	00:58	31:38	00:38	18:35	1:01:35	28
Rehab Hamdy	Girls	10:29	1:02	33:12	00:28	21:45	1:06:56	27

Relay

Athlete	Event	Total times per athlete (swim 250m, bike 6.6 km, run 1.8 km)	Total group time	Rank
Africa 1 Rehab Hamdy (EGY); Khaled Essam (EGY); Jayme-Sue Vermaas (RSA); Nathan Le Roux (RSA)	Mixed relay	25:13; 22:25; 23:47; 21:05	1:32:30	14

== Weightlifting ==
Egypt qualified 2 quotas in the boys' events and 1 quota in the girls' events based on the team ranking after the 2013 Weightlifting Youth World Championships.

Boys

Athlete	Event	Snatch		Clean & jerk		Total	Rank
Athlete	Event	Result	Rank	Result	Rank	Total	Rank
Ahmed Elsayed	−77 kg	135	4	171	3	306	4
Mohamed Shosha	−85 kg	140	4	178	2	318	3rd place, bronze medalist(s)

Girls

Athlete	Event	Snatch		Clean & jerk		Total	Rank
Athlete	Event	Result	Rank	Result	Rank	Total	Rank
Sara Ahmed	−63 kg	103	1	125	1	228	1st place, gold medalist(s)

== Wrestling ==
Egypt qualified five athletes based on its performance at the 2014 African Cadet Championships.

Key:
- VT - Victory by Fall.
- PP - Decision by Points - the loser with technical points.
- PO - Decision by Points - the loser without technical points.

Boys

Athlete	Event	Group stage				Final / RM	Rank
Athlete	Event	Opposition Score	Opposition Score	Opposition Score	Rank	Opposition Score	Rank
Mohamed Hegab	Freestyle -46kg	Gurdian Lopez (NCA); W 3-1	Duyum (TUR); L	Olivas (USA); L 0-4	3 Q	Kolekar (IND); W 3-1 ^{PP}	5
Abdalla Elgizawee	Freestyle -100kg	García (MEX); W 4-1 ^{ST}	Filho (BRA); W 4-1 ^{ST}	Hajizada (AZE); L 0-3 ^{PO}	2 Q	Yakubov (TJK); W 4-1 ^{ST}	3rd place, bronze medalist(s)
Omar Ibrahim	Greco-Roman -69kg	Polidavov (KAZ); L 0-4 ^{ST}	Alimov (UZB); W 3-0 ^{PO}	Dadov (AZE); L 0-3 ^{PO}	3 Q	Soto (PER); W 4-1 ^{ST}	5
Ahmed Ahmed	Greco-Roman -85kg	Pal (IND); W 3-1 ^{PP}	Milov (BUL); L 0-4 ^{ST}	Kalaba (SRB); W 4-0 ^{ST}	2 Q	Okhonov (TJK); W 4-0 ^{ST}	3rd place, bronze medalist(s)

Girls

Athlete	Event	Group stage				Final / RM	Rank
Athlete	Event	Opposition Score	Opposition Score	Opposition Score	Rank	Opposition Score	Rank
Habiba Ismail	Freestyle -52kg	Mukaida (JPN); L 0-4	Dorn (CAM); W 4-0	Djullibaeva (UZB); W	2 Q	Kremzer (UKR); L 0-4 ^{VT}	4
