= Ambra Esposito =

Italian swimmer

Personal information
- National team: Italy
- Born: 12 September 1996 (age 29) San Giorgio a Cremano, Italy

Sport
- Sport: Swimming
- Strokes: Backstroke
Medal record
Women's swimming
Representing Italy
Mediterranean Games
Gold medal – first place	2013 Mersin	200 m backstroke
Youth Olympic Games
Gold medal – first place	2014 Nanjing	200 m backstroke

Ambra Esposito (born 12 September 1996) is an Italian swimmer. She is the 2013 Mediterranean and 2014 Youth Olympic champion in the 200-metre backstroke.

== Career ==
At the 2012 European Junior Championships, Esposito won a bronze medal in the 100-metre backstroke behind Mie Nielsen and Jessica Fullalove, and she also won the bronze in the 200-metre backstroke behind Iuliia Larina and Iryna Hlavnyk. Esposito won the 200-metre backstroke event at the 2013 Mediterranean Games ahead of her teammate Margherita Panziera.

Esposito competed in three events at the 2014 Youth Olympics- 50-metre, 100-metre, and 200-metre backstroke. In the 50-metre backstroke, she placed 29th in the heats and did not qualify for the semifinals. After finishing 6th in the heats and the semifinals, she qualified to the finals of the 100-metre backstroke where she finished 8th. In the 200-metre backstroke, Esposito tied for the gold medal with Hannah Moore with a time of 2:10.42. She then competed at the 2014 FINA World Championships. In the 100-metre backstroke, she finished 51st in the heats, and in the 200-metre backstroke, she finished 35th in the heats.
