= Shooting at the 2014 Summer Youth Olympics =

Shooting at the II Summer Youth Olympic Games
- Venue: Fangshan Sports Training Base
- Dates: 17–22 August

Shooting at the 2014 Summer Youth Olympics was held from 17 to 22 August at the Fangshan Sports Training Base in Nanjing, China.

== Qualification ==
Each National Olympic Committee (NOC) can enter a maximum of 4 athletes, 1 per each event. As hosts, China is given a spot to compete in boys’ 10 m air pistol and girls’ 10 m air rifle events and a further 24, 6 in each event will be decided by the Tripartite Commission. The remaining 54 places shall be decided by qualification events, namely five continental qualification tournaments.

To be eligible to participate at the Youth Olympics athletes must have been born between 1 January 1996 and 31 December 1999. Furthermore, all shooters must have achieved the following Minimum Qualification Score (MQS).

- Boys 10 m Air Rifle: 60 Shots, Score of 552
- Boys 10 m Air Pistol: 60 Shots, Score of 540
- Girls 10 m Air Rifle: 40 Shots, Score of 368
- Girls 10 m Air Pistol: 40 Shots, Score of 355

The MQS must be achieved between 1 April 2013 and 8 June 2014 at an ISSF registered event.

=== Summary ===
| Nation | Men | | Women | | Athletes |
| Nation | Rifle | Pistol | Rifle | Pistol | Athletes |
|---|---|---|---|---|---|
| Armenia | X | X | | | 2 |
| Argentina | X | | X | | 2 |
| Australia | X | X | X | X | 4 |
| Austria | | | X | | 1 |
| Azerbaijan | | X | | | 1 |
| Bangladesh | | | X | | 1 |
| Belarus | | | | X | 1 |
| Bhutan | X | | | | 1 |
| Bulgaria | | X | | X | 2 |
| Canada | | X | | X | 2 |
| China | X | X | X | | 3 |
| Colombia | | X | | | 1 |
| Croatia | X | | X | | 2 |
| Czech Republic | | | | X | 1 |
| Denmark | | | | X | 1 |
| Egypt | | X | X | X | 3 |
| Finland | X | | | | 1 |
| France | | X | | | 1 |
| Germany | | | X | | 1 |
| Greece | | | | X | 1 |
| Guatemala | | X | | | 1 |
| Hungary | X | | | | 1 |
| India | X | | | X | 2 |
| Indonesia | X | | | | 1 |
| Iran | | | X | | 1 |
| Italy | X | | | | 1 |
| Japan | X | | | | 1 |
| Kazakhstan | | X | | | 1 |
| Kuwait | | | X | | 1 |
| Kyrgyzstan | | X | | | 1 |
| Latvia | | | | X | 1 |
| Macedonia | | | X | | 1 |
| Malaysia | | X | | | 1 |
| Mexico | X | | X | X | 3 |
| Moldova | | X | | | 1 |
| Mongolia | | | X | | 1 |
| Norway | | | | X | 1 |
| Pakistan | | | | X | 1 |
| Philippines | X | | | | 1 |
| Poland | | | | X | 1 |
| Qatar | X | | | | 1 |
| Russia | | | X | X | 2 |
| San Marino | | | X | | 1 |
| Serbia | X | | X | | 2 |
| Singapore | | | X | X | 2 |
| Slovakia | | | | X | 1 |
| Slovenia | | X | | | 1 |
| South Africa | X | | | | 1 |
| South Korea | | X | | X | 2 |
| Switzerland | | | X | | 1 |
| Chinese Taipei | X | | | X | 2 |
| Tajikistan | | X | | | 1 |
| Thailand | | X | | | 1 |
| Turkey | X | | | | 1 |
| United Arab Emirates | | | X | | 1 |
| Ukraine | | X | X | X | 3 |
| Uzbekistan | X | X | | | 2 |
| Total: 57 NOCs | 20 | 20 | 20 | 20 | 80 |

=== 10m Air Rifle ===
| Event | Location | Date | Total Places | Qualified Boys | Qualified Girls |
|---|---|---|---|---|---|
| Host Nation | - | - | 0/1 | - | China |
| 2013 Oceania Championship | (Australia) Sydney | 29 Nov–5 Dec 2013 | 1 | Australia | Australia |
| 2014 African Championship | (Egypt) Cairo | 17–26 February 2014 | 1 | South Africa | Egypt |
| 2014 European Championship | (Russia) Moscow | 26 Feb–6 Mar 2014 | 5/6 | Armenia; Croatia; Hungary; Serbia; Turkey | Austria; Croatia; Germany; Russia; Serbia; Ukraine |
| 2014 Asian Championship | Kuwait City | 7–13 March 2014 | 4/3 | China; Chinese Taipei; India; Uzbekistan | Iran; Mongolia; Singapore |
| American Qualification Tournament | (United States) Fort Benning | 26 Mar–4 Apr 2014 | 2 | Argentina; Mexico | Mexico; Argentina |
| Tripartite Invitation | - | - | 7/6 | Bhutan | Bangladesh; Kuwait; Macedonia; San Marino; United Arab Emirates |
| Reallocation Wild Card | - | - | 7/6 | Finland; Indonesia; Italy; Japan; Philippines; Qatar | Switzerland |
| TOTAL | | | | 20 | 20 |

=== 10m Air Pistol ===
| Event | Location | Date | Total Places | Qualified Boys | Qualified Girls |
|---|---|---|---|---|---|
| Host Nation | - | - | 1/0 | China | - |
| 2013 Oceania Championship | (Australia) Sydney | 29 Nov–5 Dec 2013 | 1 | Australia | Australia |
| 2014 African Championship | (Egypt) Cairo | 17–26 February 2014 | 1 | Egypt | Egypt |
| 2014 European Championship | (Russia) Moscow | 26 Feb–6 Mar 2014 | 4/6 | Armenia; Bulgaria; France; Ukraine | Bulgaria; Czech Republic; Greece; Latvia; Russia; Ukraine |
| 2014 Asian Championship | Kuwait City | 7–13 March 2014 | 3/4 | South Korea; Thailand; Uzbekistan | Chinese Taipei; India; Singapore; South Korea |
| American Qualification Tournament | (United States) Fort Benning | 26 Mar–4 Apr 2014 | 2 | Guatemala; Canada | Mexico; Canada |
| Tripartite Invitation | - | - | 8/6 | | Pakistan |
| Reallocation Wild Card | - | - | 8/6 | Azerbaijan; Colombia; Kazakhstan; Kyrgyzstan; Malaysia; Moldova; Slovenia; Tajikistan | Belarus; Denmark; Norway; Poland; Slovakia |
| TOTAL | | | | 20 | 20 |

== Schedule ==
The competition schedule was released by the ISSF.

All times are CST (UTC+8)

| Event date | Event day | Starting time | Event details |
|---|---|---|---|
| August 17 | Sunday | 09:00 | Girls' 10m Air Pistol Qualification |
| August 17 | Sunday | 11:00 | Girls' 10m Air Pistol Finals |
| August 18 | Monday | 09:00 | Boys' 10m Air Pistol Qualification |
| August 18 | Monday | 11:15 | Boys' 10m Air Pistol Finals |
| August 19 | Tuesday | 09:00 | Girls' 10m Air Rifle Qualification |
| August 19 | Tuesday | 11:00 | Girls' 10m Air Rifle Finals |
| August 20 | Wednesday | 09:00 | Boys' 10m Air Rifle Qualification |
| August 20 | Wednesday | 11:15 | Boys' 10m Air Rifle Finals |
| August 20 | Wednesday | 13:15 | 10m Air Pistol Mixed Team Qualification |
| August 20 | Wednesday | 15:00 | 10m Air Pistol Mixed Team Round of 16 |
| August 21 | Thursday | 09:00 | 10m Air Pistol Mixed Team Quarterfinals |
| August 21 | Thursday | 11:00 | 10m Air Pistol Mixed Team Finals |
| August 21 | Thursday | 13:45 | 10m Air Rifle Mixed Team Qualification |
| August 21 | Thursday | 15:30 | 10m Air Rifle Mixed Team Round of 16 |
| August 22 | Friday | 09:00 | 10m Air Rifle Mixed Team Quarterfinals |
| August 22 | Friday | 11:00 | 10m Air Rifle Mixed Team Finals |

== Medal summary ==
=== Medal table ===
* Host nation (China)

| Rank | Nation | Gold | Silver | Bronze | Total |
|---|---|---|---|---|---|
| 1 | Mixed-NOCs | 2 | 2 | 2 | 6 |
| 2 | China* | 1 | 0 | 0 | 1 |
| 2 | Poland | 1 | 0 | 0 | 1 |
| 2 | Switzerland | 1 | 0 | 0 | 1 |
| 2 | Ukraine | 1 | 0 | 0 | 1 |
| 6 | South Korea | 0 | 1 | 1 | 2 |
| 7 | Armenia | 0 | 1 | 0 | 1 |
| 7 | Russia | 0 | 1 | 0 | 1 |
| 7 | Singapore | 0 | 1 | 0 | 1 |
| 10 | France | 0 | 0 | 1 | 1 |
| 10 | Germany | 0 | 0 | 1 | 1 |
| 10 | Hungary | 0 | 0 | 1 | 1 |
| Totals (12 entries) | | 6 | 6 | 6 | 18 |

=== 10m Air Rifle ===
| Event | Gold | Silver | Bronze |
|---|---|---|---|
| Boys' 10m Air Rifle | Yang Haoran; China | Hrachik Babayan; Armenia | István Péni; Hungary |
| Girls' 10m Air Rifle | Sarah Hornung; Switzerland | Martina Lindsay Veloso; Singapore | Julia Budde; Germany |
| Mixed Teams' 10m Air Rifle | Hadir Mekhimar; Egypt; István Péni; Hungary | Fernanda Russo; Argentina; Santos Valdés; Mexico | Viktoriya Sukhorukova; Ukraine; Lu Shao-chuan; Chinese Taipei |

=== 10m Air Pistol ===
| Event | Gold | Silver | Bronze |
|---|---|---|---|
| Boys' 10m Air Pistol | Pavlo Korostylov; Ukraine | Kim Cheong-yong; South Korea | Édouard Dortomb; France |
| Girls' 10m Air Pistol | Agata Nowak; Poland | Margarita Lomova; Russia | Kim Min-jung; South Korea |
| Mixed Teams' 10m Air Pistol | Lidia Nencheva; Bulgaria; Vladimir Svechnikov; Uzbekistan | Teh Xiu Yi; Singapore; Ahmed Mohamed; Egypt | Agate Rašmane; Latvia; Wilmar Madrid; Guatemala |
