= Swimming at the 2014 Summer Youth Olympics – Girls' 200 metre backstroke =

Girls' 200 metre backstroke at the 2014 Summer Youth Olympics
- Venue: Nanjing Olympic Sports Centre
- Dates: 19 August (heats & final)
- Competitors: 28 from 24 nations
- Winning time: 2:10.42

Medalists
gold medal	Ambra Esposito	Italy
gold medal	Hannah Moore	United States
bronze medal	África Zamorano	Spain

The girls' 200 metre backstroke event in swimming at the 2014 Summer Youth Olympics took place on 19 August at the Nanjing Olympic Sports Centre in Nanjing, China.

== Results ==
=== Heats ===
The heats were held at 10:37.

Rank	Heat	Lane	Name	Nationality	Time	Notes
1	3	3	Hannah Moore	United States	2:11.02	Q
2	4	4	Amy Forrester	Australia	2:12.85	Q
3	4	5	Ambra Esposito	Italy	2:13.00	Q
4	2	4	Irina Prikhodko	Russia	2:14.16	Q
5	4	3	África Zamorano	Spain	2:14.47	Q
6	3	6	Mackenzie Glover	Canada	2:14.74	Q
7	2	2	Danielle Hanus	Canada	2:15.38	Q
8	2	8	Eleni Koutsouveli	Greece	2:15.46	Q
9	3	4	Iryna Hlavnyk	Ukraine	2:15.60	
10	4	1	Tatiana Perstniova	Moldova	2:15.64	
11	2	6	Nathania van Niekerk	South Africa	2:17.02	
12	3	7	Robin Neumann	Netherlands	2:17.15	
13	2	7	Tereza Grusová	Czech Republic	2:17.22	
14	4	2	Ugnė Mažutaitytė	Lithuania	2:17.53	
15	3	1	Mandy Feldbinder	Germany	2:17.80	
16	2	5	Natalia de Luccas	Brazil	2:17.83	
17	4	8	Bobbi Gichard	New Zealand	2:18.00	
18	4	7	Zanre Oberholzer	Namibia	2:18.36	
19	1	3	Roxanne Yu	Philippines	2:18.96	
20	3	5	Courtney Mykkanen	United States	2:19.27	
21	2	1	Laura Yus Fernandez	Spain	2:19.59	
22	3	2	Miono Takeuchi	Japan	2:20.18	
23	4	6	Jessica Fullalove	Great Britain	2:20.62	
24	3	8	Laoise Fleming	Ireland	2:21.89	
25	1	5	Nađa Veličković	Serbia	2:23.05	
26	1	4	Carita Luukkanen	Finland	2:24.40	
27	1	2	Carmen Marquez Orellana	El Salvador	2:25.70	
28	1	7	Thalia Bergasse	Saint Lucia	2:35.62	
	1	6	Mariam Sakr	Egypt	DNS	
	2	3	Nguyễn Thị Ánh Viên	Vietnam	DNS	

=== Final ===
The final was held at 18:36.

Rank	Lane	Name	Nationality	Time	Notes
1st place, gold medalist(s)	3	Ambra Esposito	Italy	2:10.42	
1st place, gold medalist(s)	4	Hannah Moore	United States	2:10.42	
3rd place, bronze medalist(s)	2	África Zamorano	Spain	2:11.94	
4	7	Mackenzie Glover	Canada	2:13.09	
5	6	Irina Prikhodko	Russia	2:13.93	
6	5	Amy Forrester	Australia	2:14.21	
7	1	Danielle Hanus	Canada	2:15.02	
8	8	Eleni Koutsouveli	Greece	2:15.61	
