= Weightlifting at the 2014 Summer Youth Olympics – Girls' 63 kg =

Girl's 63 kg at the II Summer Youth Olympic Games
- Venue: Nanjing International Expo Center
- Dates: August 21, 2014
- Competitors: 8 from 8 nations
- Winning total weight: 228kg

Medalists
1st place, gold medalist(s)		Sara Ahmed	Egypt
2nd place, silver medalist(s)		Ana Lilia Durán	Mexico
3rd place, bronze medalist(s)		Sofiya Zenchenko	Ukraine

The girls' 63 kg weightlifting event was the fourth women's event at the weightlifting competition at the 2014 Summer Youth Olympics, with competitors limited to a maximum of 63 kilograms of body mass.

Each lifter performed in both the snatch and clean and jerk lifts, with the final score being the sum of the lifter's best result in each. The athlete received three attempts in each of the two lifts; the score for the lift was the heaviest weight successfully lifted.

== Results ==
Rank	Name	Body Weight	Snatch (kg)				Clean & Jerk (kg)				Total (kg)
Rank	Name	Body Weight	1	2	3	Res	1	2	3	Res	Total (kg)
1st place, gold medalist(s)	Sara Ahmed (EGY)	62.57	97	~~103~~	103	103	118	125	~~129~~	125	228
2nd place, silver medalist(s)	Ana Lilia Durán (MEX)	62.14	85	88	90	90	115	118	120	120	210
3rd place, bronze medalist(s)	Sofiya Zenchenko (UKR)	62.89	~~88~~	~~88~~	88	88	112	118	120	120	208
4	Mönkhjantsangiin Ankhtsetseg (MGL)	62.88	~~90~~	90	94	94	113	~~117~~	~~118~~	113	207
5	Florina Sorina Hulpan (ROU)	62.76	85	~~88~~	~~88~~	85	105	~~111~~	~~111~~	105	190
6	Sona Poghosyan (ARM)	62.46	~~75~~	75	79	79	~~95~~	95	100	100	179
7	Kiana Elliott (AUS)	62.60	~~73~~	73	78	78	86	~~88~~	~~88~~	86	164
8	Juliana Arkoh (GHA)	61.36	60	61	62	62	~~80~~	80	82	82	144
