= Ukraine at the 2014 Summer Youth Olympics =

- IOC code: UKR
- NOC: National Olympic Committee of Ukraine
- Website: www.noc-ukr.org

in Nanjing
- Competitors: 58 in 20 sports
- Medals Ranked 6th: Gold 7 Silver 8 Bronze 8 Total 23

Summer Youth Olympics appearances (overview)
- 2010; 2014; 2018; 2026

Ukraine competed at the 2014 Summer Youth Olympics, in Nanjing, China from 16 August to 28 August 2014.

Yuliya Levchenko (athletics), Pavlo Korostylov (shooting), and Mykhailo Romanchuk (swimming) represented Ukraine at the 2016, 2020, and 2024 Summer Olympics. Liudmyla Luzan competed at the 2020 and 2024 Summer Olympics. Hanna Krasnoshlyk (diving) and Vladyslav Hryko (gymnastics) entered the Olympic competition at the 2016 Games. Hlib Piskunov (athletics) competed at the 2020 Summer Olympics. Bogdan Iadov (judo) and Anhelina Kalinina (tennis) competed at the 2024 Summer Olympics. As of 2024 Games, Romanchuk (2020) and Luzan (2020, 2024) won medals at both Youth and senior Olympics.

== Medalists ==
Medal	Name	Sport	Event	Date
Gold	Mykhailo Romanchuk	Swimming	400 metre freestyle	17 Aug
Gold	Pavlo Korostylov	Shooting	10 metre air pistol	18 Aug
Gold	Anastasiya Malyavina	Swimming	200 metre breaststroke	22 Aug
Gold	Yelyzaveta Baby	Athletics	Long jump	23 Aug
Gold	Hlib Piskunov	Athletics	Hammer throw	24 Aug
Gold	Yuliya Levchenko	Athletics	High jump	24 Aug
Gold	Ramil Gadzhyiev	Boxing	75 kg	27 Aug
Silver	Bogdan Iadov	Judo	66 kg	17 Aug
Silver	Mykhailo Romanchuk	Swimming	800 metre freestyle	21 Aug
Silver	Denys Voronovskyy	Taekwondo	+73 kg	21 Aug
Silver	Alona Byelyakova	Athletics	Discus throw	23 Aug
Silver	Vladyslav Hryko	Gymnastics	Pommel horse	23 Aug
Silver	Dzhois Koba	Athletics	200 metres	24 Aug
Silver	Liudmyla Luzan	Canoeing	C1 sprint	24 Aug
Silver	Hanna Krasnoshlyk	Diving	3m springboard	25 Aug
Bronze	Anastasiya Malyavina	Swimming	100 metre breaststroke	20 Aug
Bronze	Yulia Miiuts	Taekwondo	+63 kg	21 Aug
Bronze	Sofiya Zenchenko	Weightlifting	63 kg	21 Aug
Bronze	Ruslan Valitov	Athletics	Discus throw	23 Aug
Bronze	Vladyslav Hryko	Gymnastics	Rings	23 Aug
Bronze	Darya Tkachova; Vladyslav Nizitskyi; Rinat Udod; Anzhelika Teterych	Cycling	Mixed team relay	24 Aug
Bronze	Olesksii Masyk	Wrestling	Greco-Roman 42 kg	25 Aug
Bronze	Olena Kremzer	Wrestling	Freestyle 52 kg	26 Aug

Mixed-NOCs events

Medal	Name	Sport	Event	Date
Gold	Anton Kuznetsov	Modern pentathlon	Mixed relay	26 Aug
Gold	Anhelina Kalinina	Tennis	Girls' doubles	23 Aug
Bronze	Liudmyla Drozdova	Judo	Mixed team	21 Aug
Bronze	Viktoriya Sukhorukova	Shooting	Mixed teams' 10 metre air rifle	22 Aug
Bronze	Pylyp Tkachenko	Diving	Mixed team	27 Aug

== Competitors ==
The following is the list of number of competitors participating at the Games per sport.

Sport	Men	Women	Total
Archery	1	1	2
Athletics	6	8	14
Badminton	1	1	2
Beach volleyball	2	—	2
Boxing	3	1	4
Canoeing	1	1	2
Cycling	2	2	4
Diving	1	1	2
Fencing	—	1	1
Gymnastics	1	1	2
Judo	1	1	2
Modern pentathlon	1	1	2
Rowing	—	2	2
Sailing	—	1	1
Shooting	1	2	3
Swimming	2	2	4
Taekwondo	2	1	3
Tennis	—	1	1
Triathlon	—	1	1
Weightlifting	1	1	2
Wrestling	1	1	2
Total	27	31	58

== Archery ==
Ukraine qualified a female archer from its performance at the 2013 World Archery Youth Championships. Ukraine later qualified a male archer from its performance at the 2014 European Archery Youth Championships.

Individual

Athlete	Event	Ranking round		Round of 32	Round of 16	Quarterfinals	Semifinals	Final / BM	Rank
Athlete	Event	Score	Seed	Opposition Score	Opposition Score	Opposition Score	Opposition Score	Opposition Score	Rank
Anton Komar	Boys' Individual	634	23	Muto (JPN); L 4–6	Did not advance				17
Viktoriia Oleksiuk	Girls' Individual	655	6	Rivera (MEX); W 6–0	Koike (JPN); L 5–6	Did not advance			9

Team

Athletes	Event	Ranking round		Round of 32	Round of 16	Quarterfinals	Semifinals	Final / BM	Rank
Athletes	Event	Score	Seed	Opposition Score	Opposition Score	Opposition Score	Opposition Score	Opposition Score	Rank
Anton Komar (UKR); Sylwia Zyzańska (POL)	Mixed Team	1277	22	Rasin (ISR); Gazoz (TUR); L 2-5	Did not advance				17
Viktoriia Oleksiuk (UKR); Xander Reddig (NAM)	Mixed Team	1271	25	Villegas (VEN); Baláž (SVK); L 0-6	Did not advance				17

== Athletics ==
Ukraine qualified 14 athletes.

Qualification Legend: Q=Final A (medal); qB=Final B (non-medal); qC=Final C (non-medal); qD=Final D (non-medal); qE=Final E (non-medal)

Boys
Field Events

Athlete	Event	Qualification		Final	
Athlete	Event	Distance	Rank	Distance	Rank
Oleksandr Malosilov	Triple jump	15.31	6 Q	15.41	4
Oleksandr Barannikov	High jump	2.10	2 Q	2.14	4
Vladyslav Malykhin	Pole vault	4.80 PB	8 Q	4.65	7
Ruslan Valitov	Discus throw	56.97 PB	4 Q	57.48 PB	3rd place, bronze medalist(s)
Oleksandr Kozubskyy	Javelin throw	69.96	9 qB	DNS	
Hlib Piskunov	Hammer throw	77.17	3 Q	82.65 PB	1st place, gold medalist(s)

Girls
Track & road events

Athlete	Event	Heats		Final	
Athlete	Event	Result	Rank	Result	Rank
Dzhois Koba	200 m	23.88	2 Q	23.94	2nd place, silver medalist(s)
Yana Kachur	400 m	54.97	10 qB	54.48	9
Maryna Duts	800 m	2:13.76	16 qB	2:12.13 PB	12

Field events

Athlete	Event	Qualification		Final	
Athlete	Event	Distance	Rank	Distance	Rank
Yelyzaveta Baby	Long jump	5.99	3 Q	6.26 PB	1st place, gold medalist(s)
Yuliya Levchenko	High jump	1.78	1 Q	1.89 PB	1st place, gold medalist(s)
Yuliya Bayrak	Shot put	14.92	10 qB	15.41 PB	9
Al'Ona Byelyakova	Discus throw	50.89	1 Q	51.64	2nd place, silver medalist(s)
Viktoriya Sakhno	Hammer throw	60.89	9 qB	60.33	9

== Badminton ==
Ukraine qualified two athletes based on the 2 May 2014 BWF Junior World Rankings.

Singles

Athlete	Event	Group stage				Quarterfinal	Semifinal	Final / BM	Rank
Athlete	Event	Opposition Score	Opposition Score	Opposition Score	Rank	Opposition Score	Opposition Score	Opposition Score	Rank
Ruslan Sarsekenov	Boys' Singles	Pham (VIE); L 0-2	Joshi (IND); L 0-2	Petrovic (SRB); L 0-2	4	did not advance			
Vladyslava Lesnaya	Girls' Singles	Pavlinić (CRO); L 0-2	Qin (CHN); L 0-2	Lee (TPE); L 0-2	4	did not advance			

Doubles

Athlete	Event	Group stage				Quarterfinal	Semifinal	Final / BM	Rank
Athlete	Event	Opposition Score	Opposition Score	Opposition Score	Rank	Opposition Score	Opposition Score	Opposition Score	Rank
Akane Yamaguchi (JPN); Ruslan Sarsekenov (UKR)	Mixed Doubles	Joshi (IND); Kabelo (BOT); W 2-0	Abdelhakim (EGY); Mitsova (BUL); W 2-0	Krapez (SLO); Chen (NED); L 0-2	2	did not advance			
Vladyslava Lesnaya (UKR); Ygor Coelho de Oliveira (BRA)	Mixed Doubles	Vlaar (NED); Lais (AUT); L 0-2	Seo (KOR); Doha (EGY); W 2-0	Shi (CHN); Lai (AUS); L 0-2	3	did not advance			

== Beach volleyball ==
Ukraine qualified a boys' team from their performance at the 2014 CEV Youth Continental Cup Final.

Athletes	Event	Preliminary round	Standing	Round of 24	Round of 16	Quarterfinals	Semifinals	Final / BM	Rank
Athletes	Event	Opposition Score	Standing	Opposition Score	Opposition Score	Opposition Score	Opposition Score	Opposition Score	Rank
Illia Kovalov; Oleh Plotnytskyi	Boys'	Kamara/Lombi (SLE); W w/o	2 Q	Bye	Lanci/Wanderley (BRA); L 0 - 2	Did not advance			17
Illia Kovalov; Oleh Plotnytskyi	Boys'	Sousa/Marques (STP); W 2 - 0	2 Q	Bye	Lanci/Wanderley (BRA); L 0 - 2	Did not advance			17
Illia Kovalov; Oleh Plotnytskyi	Boys'	Aulisi/Aveiro (ARG); W 2 - 0	2 Q	Bye	Lanci/Wanderley (BRA); L 0 - 2	Did not advance			17
Illia Kovalov; Oleh Plotnytskyi	Boys'	Jongklang/Nakprakhong (THA); L 1 - 2	2 Q	Bye	Lanci/Wanderley (BRA); L 0 - 2	Did not advance			17
Illia Kovalov; Oleh Plotnytskyi	Boys'	MacNeil/Richards (CAN); W 2 - 0	2 Q	Bye	Lanci/Wanderley (BRA); L 0 - 2	Did not advance			17

== Boxing ==
Ukraine qualified four boxers based on its performance at the 2014 AIBA Youth World Championships.

Boys

Athlete	Event	Preliminaries	Semifinals	Final / RM	Rank
Athlete	Event	Opposition Result	Opposition Result	Opposition Result	Rank
Viktor Petrov	-64 kg	Arecchia (ITA); L 1-2	Did not advance	Bout for 5th place Tóth (HUN); W 3-0	5
Ramil Gadzhyiev	-75 kg	Tevi-Fuimaono (AUS); W 3-0	Mardonov (UZB); W 2-1	Nesterov (RUS); W 3-0	1st place, gold medalist(s)
Robert Marton	-91 kg	Hernandez (CUB); L 0-3	Did not advance	Bout for 5th place Kazlou (BLR); W 3-0	5

Girls

Athlete	Event	Preliminaries	Semifinals	Final / RM	Rank
Athlete	Event	Opposition Result	Opposition Result	Opposition Result	Rank
Anhelina Bondarenko	-60 kg	Yıldız (TUR); L 1-2	Did not advance	Bout for 5th place Floridia (ITA); L 0-2	6

== Canoeing ==
Ukraine qualified two boats based on its performance at the 2013 World Junior Canoe Sprint and Slalom Championships.

Boys

Athlete	Event	Qualification		Round of 16		Quarterfinals	Semifinals	Final / BM	Rank
Athlete	Event	Time	Rank	Time	Rank	Opposition Result	Opposition Result	Opposition Result	Rank
Bohdan Chaban	C1 slalom	DSQ		Did not advance					
Bohdan Chaban	C1 sprint	1:50.075	7 Q	1:51.812	7 Q	Korobov (LTU); L 1:49.915	Did not advance		7

Girls

Athlete	Event	Qualification		Repechage		Quarterfinals	Semifinals	Final / BM	Rank
Athlete	Event	Time	Rank	Time	Rank	Opposition Result	Opposition Result	Opposition Result	Rank
Liudmyla Luzan	C1 slalom	DNF		Did not advance					
Liudmyla Luzan	C1 sprint	2:06.398	2 Q	—N/a		Weratschnig (AUT); W 2:08.220	Morales (MEX); W 2:11.033	Bobr (BLR); L 2:27.122	2nd place, silver medalist(s)

== Cycling ==
Ukraine qualified a boys' and girls' team based on its ranking issued by the UCI.

Team

Athletes	Event	Cross-Country Eliminator		Time Trial			BMX		Cross-Country Race			Road Race			Total Pts	Rank
Athletes	Event	Rank	Points	Time	Rank	Points	Rank	Points	Time	Rank	Points	Time	Rank	Points	Total Pts	Rank
Vladyslav Nizitskyi; Rinat Udod	Boys' Team	15	2	5:33.54	25	0	9	30	57:12	5	40	1:48:58; 1:37:29	51; 25	0	72	13
Anzhelika Teterych; Darya Tkachova	Girls' Team	14	3	6:12.07	10	10	7	50	46:35	4	50	1:12:36; 1:12:48	30; 32	0	113	10

Mixed Relay

Athletes	Event	Cross-Country Girls' Race	Cross-Country Boys' Race	Boys' Road Race	Girls' Road Race	Total Time	Rank
Darya Tkachova; Vladyslav Nizitskyi; Rinat Udod; Anzhelika Teterych	Mixed Team Relay	3:25 (8)	6:15 (5)	11:52 (6)	18:00 (3)	18:00	3rd place, bronze medalist(s)

== Diving ==
Ukraine qualified four quotas based on its performance at the Nanjing 2014 Diving Qualifying Event.

Athlete	Event	Preliminary		Final	
Athlete	Event	Points	Rank	Points	Rank
Pylyp Tkachenko	Boys' 3 m springboard	515.45	6	545.65	5
Pylyp Tkachenko	Boys' 10 m platform	471.45	5	445.65	8
Hanna Krasnoshlyk	Girls' 3 m springboard	394.40	7	459.10	2nd place, silver medalist(s)
Hanna Krasnoshlyk	Girls' 10 m platform	382.95	4	375.80	7
Gracia Leydon Mahoney (USA); Pylyp Tkachenko (UKR)	Mixed team	—N/a		354.00	3rd place, bronze medalist(s)
Hanna Krasnoshlyk (UKR); Jonathan Chan (SIN)	Mixed team	—N/a		303.20	8

== Fencing ==
Ukraine qualified one athlete based on its performance at the 2014 FIE Cadet World Championships.

Girls

Athlete	Event	Pool Round	Seed	Round of 16	Quarterfinals	Semifinals	Final / BM	Rank
Athlete	Event	Opposition Score	Seed	Opposition Score	Opposition Score	Opposition Score	Opposition Score	Rank
Inna Brovko	Épée	Pool 1 Nixon (USA) de Marchi (ITA); Yoshimura (JPN); Simms-Lymn (JAM)	5	Nagy (HUN); W 15-9	Linde (SWE); L 14-15	Did not advance		8

Mixed Team

Athletes	Event	Round of 16	Quarterfinals	Semifinals / PM	Final / PM	Rank
Athletes	Event	Opposition Score	Opposition Score	Opposition Score	Opposition Score	Rank
Europe 4 Theodora Gkountoura (GRE); Claudia Borella (ITA); Inna Brovko (UKR); Tudor Cucu (ROU); Petar Files (CRO); Samuel Unterhauser (GER)	Team	Bye	Asia-Oceania 1 (MIX); L 22-30	America 1 (MIX); W 30-27	America 2 (MIX); L 28-30	6

== Gymnastics ==
=== Artistic Gymnastics ===
Ukraine qualified one athlete based on its performance at the 2014 European MAG Championships.

Boys

Athlete	Event	Apparatus						Total	Rank
Athlete	Event	F	PH	R	V	PB	HB	Total	Rank
Vladyslav Hryko	Qualification	13.700 10	14.150 1 Q	13.300 9 Q	14.100 14	13.300 11	13.150 9	81.700	4 Q
Vladyslav Hryko	All-Around	14.000	14.050	13.350	13.950	13.625	12.950	81.925	6
Vladyslav Hryko	Pommel Horse	—N/a						13.933	2nd place, silver medalist(s)
Vladyslav Hryko	Rings	—N/a						13.533	3rd place, bronze medalist(s)

=== Rhythmic Gymnastics ===
Ukraine qualified one athlete based on its performance at the 2014 Rhythmic Gymnastics Grand Prix in Moscow.

Individual

Athlete	Event	Qualification						Final					
Athlete	Event	Hoop	Ball	Clubs	Ribbon	Total	Rank	Hoop	Ball	Clubs	Ribbon	Total	Rank
Valeriya Khanina	Individual	12.900	13.400	14.150	13.650	54.100	6 Q	12.950	13.350	13.900	13.550	53.750	6

== Judo ==
Ukraine qualified two athletes based on its performance at the 2013 Cadet World Judo Championships.

Individual

Athlete	Event	Round of 32	Round of 16	Quarterfinals	Semifinals	Rep 1	Rep 2	Rep 3	Rep 4	Final / BM	Rank
Athlete	Event	Opposition Result	Opposition Result	Opposition Result	Opposition Result	Opposition Result	Opposition Result	Opposition Result	Opposition Result	Opposition Result	Rank
Bogdan Iadov	Boys' -66 kg	—N/a	Gandia (PUR); W 001-000	Tursunov (UZB); W 100-001	Ryu (KOR); W 010-010	—N/a				Abe (JPN); L 000-100	2nd place, silver medalist(s)
Liudmyla Drozdova	Girls' -63 kg	—N/a	Tintor (SRB); W 110-000	Dobre (ROU); L 000-100	Did not advance	—N/a	Sunjevic (MNE); L 000-101	Did not advance			11

Team

Athletes	Event	Round of 16	Quarterfinals	Semifinals	Final	Rank
Athletes	Event	Opposition Result	Opposition Result	Opposition Result	Opposition Result	Rank
Team Chochishvili; Stefania Adelina Dobre (ROU); Fatim Fofana (CIV); Bogdan Iadov (UKR); Louis Krieber-Gagnon (CAN); Liu Xiaoyu (CHN); Yu-Hsuan Lo (TPE); Marton Sarecz (HUN); Estefania Soriano (DOM)	Mixed Team	Team Geesink (MIX); L 3–4	Did not advance			9
Team Douillet; Gustavo Basile (ARG); Marko Bubanja (AUT); Adonis Diaz (USA); Liudmyla Drozdova (UKR); Lee Hye-kyeong (KOR); Brigita Matic (CRO); Peter Miles (GBR)	Mixed Team	Team Yamashita (MIX); W 3^{200} – 3^{112}	Team Nevzorov (MIX); W 5 – 2	Team Geesink (MIX); L 3^{111} – 3^{202}	Did not advance	3rd place, bronze medalist(s)

== Modern Pentathlon ==
Ukraine qualified two athletes based on its performance at the 2014 Youth A World Championships.

Athlete	Event	Fencing Ranking Round (épée one touch)		Swimming (200 m freestyle)			Fencing Final round (épée one touch)		Combined: Shooting/Running (10 m air pistol)/(3000 m)			Total Points	Final Rank
Athlete	Event	Results	Rank	Time	Rank	Points	Rank	Points	Time	Rank	Points	Total Points	Final Rank
Anton Kuznetsov	Boys' Individual	7-16	22	1:59.74	2	341	23	195	12:10.06	3	570	1106	12
Yana Polishchuk	Girls' Individual	6-17	21	2:18.70	6	284	19	210	14:16.30	15	444	938	17
Anton Kuznetsov (UKR); Maria Teixeira (POR)	Mixed Relay	24V/22D	9	1:58.45	2	345	9	276	11:57.05	1	583	1204	1st place, gold medalist(s)
Yana Polishchuk (UKR); Martin Vlach (CZE)	Mixed Relay	25V/21D	6	2:03.35	13	330	7	285	11:20.97	9	560	1175	5

== Rowing ==
Ukraine qualified one boat based on its performance at the 2013 World Rowing Junior Championships.

Athlete	Event	Heats		Repechage		Final	
Athlete	Event	Time	Rank	Time	Rank	Time	Rank
Daria Halahan; Alla Sarkanych	Girls' Pairs	3:35.51	4 R	3:36.86	3 FB	3:47.15	7

Qualification Legend: FA=Final A (medal); FB=Final B (non-medal); FC=Final C (non-medal); FD=Final D (non-medal); SA/B=Semifinals A/B; SC/D=Semifinals C/D; R=Repechage

== Sailing ==
Ukraine qualified one boat based on its performance at the Byte CII European Continental Qualifiers.

Athlete	Event	Race											Net Points	Final Rank
Athlete	Event	1	2	3	4	5	6	7	8	9	10	M*	Net Points	Final Rank
Kateryna Gumenko	Girls' Byte CII	9	(18)	9	12	7	10	1	4	Cancelled		70.00	52.00	4

== Shooting ==
Ukraine qualified three shooters based on its performance at the 2014 European Shooting Championships.

Individual

Athlete	Event	Qualification		Final	
Athlete	Event	Points	Rank	Points	Rank
Pavlo Korostylov	Boys' 10m Air Pistol	582	2 Q	203.4	1st place, gold medalist(s)
Viktoriya Sukhorukova	Girls' 10m Air Rifle	405.5	14	Did not advance	
Polina Konarieva	Girls' 10m Air Pistol	374	7 Q	77.1	8

Team

Athletes	Event	Qualification		Round of 16	Quarterfinals	Semifinals	Final / BM	Rank
Athletes	Event	Points	Rank	Opposition Result	Opposition Result	Opposition Result	Opposition Result	Rank
Viktoriya Sukhorukova (UKR); Shao-Chuan Lu (TPE)	Mixed Team 10m Air Rifle	822.2	4 Q	Monika Izabela Woodhouse (AUS); Yang Haoran (CHN); W 10 - 5	Angirmaa Nergui (MGL); Prashant (IND); W 10 - 9	Santos Valdés (MEX); Russo (ARG); L 8 - 10	Milovanovic (SRB); Riccardi (SMR); W 10 – 6	3rd place, bronze medalist(s)
Pavlo Korostylov (UKR); Javeria Shafqat (PAK)	Mixed Team 10m Air Pistol	762-28x	1 Q	Todorov (BUL); Downing (AUS); L 7 - 10	Did not advance			9
Polina Konarieva (UKR); Ion Aric (MDA)	Mixed Team 10m Air Pistol	749	7 Q	Rivera (COL); Lomova (RUS); W 10-9	Igityan (ARM); Chung (TPE); L 0-10	Did not advance		5

== Swimming ==
Ukraine qualified four swimmers.

Boys

Athlete	Event	Heat		Semifinal		Final	
Athlete	Event	Time	Rank	Time	Rank	Time	Rank
Mykhailo Romanchuk	400 m freestyle	3:53.31	4 Q	—N/a		3:49.76	1st place, gold medalist(s)
Mykhailo Romanchuk	800 m freestyle	—N/a				7:56.34	2nd place, silver medalist(s)
Andrii Khloptsov	50 m backstroke	26.53	12 Q	25.95	7 Q	26.10	8
Andrii Khloptsov	100 m backstroke	57.06	18	Did not advance			

Girls

Athlete	Event	Heat		Semifinal		Final	
Athlete	Event	Time	Rank	Time	Rank	Time	Rank
Iryna Hlavnyk	200 m freestyle	2:07.26	29	—N/a		Did not advance	
Iryna Hlavnyk	50 m backstroke	29.74	13 Q	29.51	11	Did not advance	
Iryna Hlavnyk	100 m backstroke	1:03.10	12 Q	1:02.98	10	Did not advance	
Iryna Hlavnyk	200 m backstroke	2:15.60	9	—N/a		Did not advance	
Iryna Hlavnyk	200 m individual medley	2:23.61	23	—N/a		Did not advance	
Anastasiya Malyavina	50 m breaststroke	32.55	13 Q	32.03	5 Q	31.89	4
Anastasiya Malyavina	100 m breaststroke	1:08.91	1 Q	1:08.71	3 Q	1:08.16	3rd place, bronze medalist(s)
Anastasiya Malyavina	200 m breaststroke	2:30.11	2 Q	—N/a		2:26.43	1st place, gold medalist(s)

== Taekwondo ==
Ukraine qualified three athletes based on its performance at the Taekwondo Qualification Tournament.

Boys

Athlete	Event	Round of 16	Quarterfinals	Semifinals	Final	Rank
Athlete	Event	Opposition Result	Opposition Result	Opposition Result	Opposition Result	Rank
Yurii Savenko	−73 kg	—N/a	Eissa (EGY); L 8 - 21 (PTG)	Did not advance		5
Denys Voronovskyy	+73 kg	Bye	Kobal (SLO); W 7 - 2	Bayram (TUR); W 9 - 4	Miangue (FRA); L 3 - 6	2nd place, silver medalist(s)

Girls

Athlete	Event	Round of 16	Quarterfinals	Semifinals	Final	Rank
Athlete	Event	Opposition Result	Opposition Result	Opposition Result	Opposition Result	Rank
Yuliia Miiuts	+63 kg	Costa (CPV); W DSQ	Arana (MEX); W 8 - 7	Yount (USA); L 4 - 9	Did not advance	3rd place, bronze medalist(s)

== Tennis ==
Ukraine qualified one athlete based on the 9 June 2014 ITF World Junior Rankings.

Singles

Athlete	Event	Round of 32	Round of 16	Quarterfinals	Semifinals	Final / BM	Rank
Athlete	Event	Opposition Score	Opposition Score	Opposition Score	Opposition Score	Opposition Score	Rank
Anhelina Kalinina	Girls' Singles	Komardina (RUS); W 2-1; 6^{3}-7^{7}, 6-3, 6-2	Bains (AUS); W 2-0; 6-2, 6-1	Stollár (HUN); W 2-0; 6-1, 7-5	Shymanovich (BLR); L 1-2; 6-3, 6^{7}-7^{9}, 2-6	Paražinskaitė (LTU); L 0-2; 3-6, 5-7	4

Doubles

Athletes	Event	Round of 32	Round of 16	Quarterfinals	Semifinals	Final / BM	Rank
Athletes	Event	Opposition Score	Opposition Score	Opposition Score	Opposition Score	Opposition Score	Rank
Anhelina Kalinina (UKR); Iryna Shymanovich (BLR)	Girls' Doubles	—N/a	Herazo (COL); Stefani (BRA); W 2-0; 6-3, 7^{7}-6^{3}	Heinová (CZE); Vondroušová (CZE); W 2-0; 7-5, 7^{8}-6^{6}	Ostapenko (LAT); Paražinskaitė (LTU); W 2-0; 6-1, 6-3	Kasatkina (RUS); Komardina (RUS); W 2-0; 6-4, 6-4	1st place, gold medalist(s)
Anhelina Kalinina (UKR); Pavel Rogan (MNE)	Mixed Doubles	Samir (EGY); Harris (RSA); L 0-2; 2-6, 4-6	Did not advance				17

== Triathlon ==
Ukraine qualified one athlete based on its performance at the 2014 European Youth Olympic Games Qualifier.

Individual

Athlete	Event	Swim (750m)	Trans 1	Bike (20km)	Trans 2	Run (5km)	Total Time	Rank
Sofiya Pryyma	Girls	11:18	00:52	33:07	00:29	19:47	1:05:33	22

Relay

Athlete	Event	Total Times per Athlete (Swim 250m, Bike 6.6km, Run 1.8km)	Total Group Time	Rank
World Team 1 Jessica Romero Tinoco (MEX); Victor Manuel Herrera de la Hoz (CUB); Sofiya Pryyma (UKR); Philip Horwarth (AUT)	Mixed Relay	23:58; 21:07; 23:07; 20:52	1:29:04	10

== Weightlifting ==
Ukraine qualified 1 quota in the boys' and girls' events based on the team ranking after the 2013 Weightlifting Youth World Championships.

Boys

Athlete	Event	Snatch		Clean & jerk		Total	Rank
Athlete	Event	Result	Rank	Result	Rank	Total	Rank
Yevgeniy Fesak	+85 kg	130	6	171	6	301	7

Girls

Athlete	Event	Snatch		Clean & jerk		Total	Rank
Athlete	Event	Result	Rank	Result	Rank	Total	Rank
Sofiya Zenchenko	−63 kg	88	4	120	2	208	3rd place, bronze medalist(s)

== Wrestling ==
Ukraine qualified two athletes based on its performance at the 2014 European Cadet Championships.

Key:
- VT - Victory by Fall.
- PP - Decision by Points - the loser with technical points.
- PO - Decision by Points - the loser without technical points.

Boys

Athlete	Event	Group stage				Final / RM	Rank
Athlete	Event	Opposition Score	Opposition Score	Opposition Score	Rank	Opposition Score	Rank
Olesksii Masyk	Greco-Roman -42kg	Aslan (TUR); L	Belghelam (ALG); W 3-1	Leilua (ASA); W 4-0	2 Q	Isoev (TJK); W 3-1 ^{PP}	3rd place, bronze medalist(s)

Girls

Athlete	Event	Group stage				Final / RM	Rank
Athlete	Event	Opposition Score	Opposition Score	Opposition Score	Rank	Opposition Score	Rank
Olena Kremzer	Freestyle -52kg	Vasquez (ESA); W 4 - 0	Gurbanova (AZE); L	Kennett (CAN); W	2 Q	Ismali (EGY); W 4-0 ^{VT}	3rd place, bronze medalist(s)
