= Swimming at the 2014 Summer Youth Olympics – Girls' 100 metre backstroke =

Girls' 100 metre backstroke at the 2014 Summer Youth Olympics
- Venue: Nanjing Olympic Sports Centre
- Dates: August 17, 2014 (heats & semifinals); August 18, 2014 (final)
- Competitors: 33
- Winning time: 1:01.22

Medalists
gold medal	Clara Smiddy	United States
silver medal	Jessica Fullalove	Great Britain
bronze medal	Bobbi Gichard	New Zealand

The girls' 100 metre backstroke event in swimming at the 2014 Summer Youth Olympics took place on 17–18 August at the Nanjing Olympic Sports Centre in Nanjing, China.

== Results ==
=== Heats ===
The heats were held at 10:42.

Rank	Heat	Lane	Name	Nationality	Time	Notes
1	5	4	Clara Smiddy	United States	1:01.73	Q
2	3	4	Natalia de Luccas	Brazil	1:02.05	Q
3	4	5	Danielle Hanus	Canada	1:02.19	Q
4	5	2	Irina Prikhodko	Russia	1:02.25	Q
5	5	5	Maaike de Waard	Netherlands	1:02.33	Q
6	5	3	Ambra Esposito	Italy	1:02.37	Q
7	3	2	Bobbi Gichard	New Zealand	1:02.39	Q
8	5	7	Gabrielle Fa'amausili	New Zealand	1:02.41	Q
9	4	4	Jessica Fullalove	Great Britain	1:02.58	Q
10	4	6	Laura Yus Fernandez	Spain	1:03.01	Q
11	4	1	Mackenzie Glover	Canada	1:03.03	Q
12	5	6	Iryna Hlavnyk	Ukraine	1:03.10	Q
13	3	3	Amy Forrester	Australia	1:03.18	Q
14	3	7	Karolina Hajkova	Slovakia	1:03.29	Q
15	4	2	Tereza Grusova	Czech Republic	1:03.41	Q
16	4	3	Mandy Feldbinder	Germany	1:03.43	Q
17	2	3	Eleni Koutsouveli	Greece	1:03.48	
18	5	1	Nathania van Niekerk	South Africa	1:03.94	
19	4	8	Tatiana Perstniova	Moldova	1:04.05	
20	3	8	Yekaterina Dymchenko	Kazakhstan	1:04.23	
21	3	1	Zanre Oberholzer	Namibia	1:04.52	
22	2	5	Robin Neumann	Netherlands	1:04.84	
23	4	7	Emma Terebo	France	1:04.87	
24	3	6	Miono Takeuchi	Japan	1:05.11	
25	2	4	Katsiaryna Afanasyeva	Belarus	1:05.13	
26	2	1	Roxanne Yu	Philippines	1:05.16	
27	3	5	Courtney Mykkanen	United States	1:05.80	
28	5	8	Carita Luukkanen	Finland	1:05.85	
29	2	7	Naomi Ruele	Botswana	1:05.98	
30	1	4	Laoise Fleming	Ireland	1:06.21	
31	2	2	Svenja Stoffel	Switzerland	1:07.14	
32	1	5	Robyn Lee	Zimbabwe	1:07.27	
33	1	3	Brienne Renfurm	Suriname	1:09.70	
-	2	6	Mariam Sakr	Egypt	DNS	

=== Semifinals ===
The semifinals were held at 18:30.

Rank	Heat	Lane	Name	Nationality	Time	Notes
1	2	2	Jessica Fullalove	Great Britain	1:01.35	Q
2	2	4	Clara Smiddy	United States	1:01.38	Q
3	2	6	Bobbi Gichard	New Zealand	1:01.70	Q
4	1	4	Natalia de Luccas	Brazil	1:02.06	Q
5	2	5	Danielle Hanus	Canada	1:02.12	Q
6	1	3	Ambra Esposito	Italy	1:02.22	Q
7	1	5	Irina Prikhodko	Russia	1:02.24	Q
8	2	3	Maaike de Waard	Netherlands	1:02.34	QSO
8	2	8	Tereza Grusova	Czech Republic	1:02.34	QSO
10	1	7	Iryna Hlavnyk	Ukraine	1:02.98	
11	1	6	Gabrielle Fa'amausili	New Zealand	1:03.10	
12	2	1	Amy Forrester	Australia	1:03.12	
13	1	2	Laura Yus Fernandez	Spain	1:03.17	
14	2	7	Mackenzie Glover	Canada	1:03.20	
15	1	8	Mandy Feldbinder	Germany	1:03.40	
16	1	1	Karolina Hajkova	Slovakia	1:03.56	

==== Swim-off ====
The swim-off was held at 00:09.

Rank	Lane	Name	Nationality	Time	Notes
1	4	Maaike de Waard	Netherlands	1:01.66	Q
2	5	Tereza Grusova	Czech Republic	1:03.08	

=== Final ===
The final was held at 19:06.

Rank	Lane	Name	Nationality	Time	Notes
1st place, gold medalist(s)	5	Clara Smiddy	United States	1:01.22	
2nd place, silver medalist(s)	4	Jessica Fullalove	Great Britain	1:01.23	
3rd place, bronze medalist(s)	3	Bobbi Gichard	New Zealand	1:01.25	
4	6	Natalia de Luccas	Brazil	1:01.39	
5	8	Maaike de Waard	Netherlands	1:01.56	
6	1	Irina Prikhodko	Russia	1:01.77	
7	2	Danielle Hanus	Canada	1:01.81	
8	7	Ambra Esposito	Italy	1:02.55	
