= Swimming at the 2017 Summer Universiade – Women's 1500 metre freestyle =

Women's 1500 metre freestyle at the 2017 Summer Universiade

Women's 1500 metre freestyle at the 2017 Summer Universiade
- Venue: National Taiwan Sport University Arena
- Location: Taipei, Taiwan
- Dates: 22 August (heats); 23 August (final)
- Competitors: 16 from 12 nations
- Winning time: 15:57.90

Medalists
gold medal	Simona Quadarella	Italy
silver medal	Sarah Köhler	Germany
bronze medal	Hannah Moore	United States

The Women's 1500 metre freestyle competition at the 2017 Summer Universiade was held on 22 and 23 August 2017.

== Records ==
Prior to the competition, the existing world and Universiade records were as follows.

World record	Katie Ledecky (USA)	15:25.48	Kazan, Russia	4 August 2015
Competition record	Stephanie Peacock (USA)	16:04.44	Kazan, Russia	13 July 2013

The following new records were set during this competition.

Date	Event	Name	Nationality	Time	Record
23 August	Final	Simona Quadarella	Italy	15:57.90	UR

== Results ==
=== Heats ===
The heats were held on 22 August at 10:30.

Rank	Heat	Lane	Name	Nationality	Time	Notes
1	2	4	Simona Quadarella	Italy	16:15.14	Q
2	2	5	Hannah Moore	United States	16:16.85	Q
3	1	4	Sarah Köhler	Germany	16:21.49	Q
4	2	6	Yukimi Moriyama	Japan	16:22.41	Q
5	1	5	Julia Hassler	Liechtenstein	16:24.42	Q
6	1	6	Kiah Melverton	Australia	16:24.95	Q
7	1	2	Viviane Jungblut	Brazil	16:28.17	Q
8	2	3	Giulia Gabbrielleschi	Italy	16:32.36	Q
9	1	3	Sierra Schmidt	United States	16:33.36	
10	2	2	Kareena Lee	Australia	16:46.63	
11	2	7	Adeline Furst	France	16:49.83	
12	1	1	Joanna Zachoszcz	Poland	17:03.64	
13	2	1	Tereza Závadová	Czech Republic	17:07.04	
14	1	7	Martina Elhenická	Czech Republic	17:27.24	
15	2	8	Dóra Kiss	Hungary	17:28.34	
16	1	8	Tseng Chieh-сhuan	Chinese Taipei	17:48.72	

=== Final ===
The final was held on 23 August at 19:02.

Rank	Lane	Name	Nationality	Time	Notes
1st place, gold medalist(s)	4	Simona Quadarella	Italy	15:57.90	UR
2nd place, silver medalist(s)	3	Sarah Köhler	Germany	15:59.85	NR
3rd place, bronze medalist(s)	5	Hannah Moore	United States	16:11.68	
4	7	Kiah Melverton	Australia	16:15.83	
5	2	Julia Hassler	Liechtenstein	16:22.12	
6	1	Viviane Jungblut	Brazil	16:22.48	NR
7	6	Yukimi Moriyama	Japan	16:23.18	
8	8	Giulia Gabbrielleschi	Italy	16:27.92	
