= Afaf El-Hodhod =

Egyptian sport shooter

Personal information
- Full name: Afaf El-Hodhod
- Nationality: Egypt
- Born: 1 October 1996 (age 30) Cairo, Egypt
- Height: 1.62 m (5 ft 4 in)
- Weight: 54 kg (119 lb)

Sport
- Sport: Shooting
- Events: 10 m air pistol (AP40); 25 m pistol (SP)

Afaf El-Hodhod (Arabic: عفاف هدهد; born October 1, 1996, in Cairo) is an Egyptian sport shooter. She won a total of three medals, including two golds, in both air and sport pistol at the African Shooting Championships (2014 and 2015), and also attained a top-five finish at the 2014 Summer Youth Olympics.

El-Hodhod made her first Olympic team for Egypt as a seventeen-year-old at the 2014 Summer Youth Olympics in Nanjing, China, where she competed in the girls' 10 m air pistol. Coming to the final with a third seed at 380 points, El-Hodhod commanded an early lead after thirteen shots, but then spoiled her previous good results with a 7.7 that saw her fall to fifth at 137.4.

When Cairo hosted the 2015 African Championships on her senior debut, El-Hodhod broke an African record of 381 out of a possible 400 approaching to the final, and then beat Tunisia's 2012 Olympian Noura Nasri in a duel to defend her air pistol title with a score of 198.2; the first being previously done as a junior in 2014.
