= Uzbekistan at the 2014 Summer Youth Olympics =

- IOC code: UZB
- NOC: National Olympic Committee of the Republic of Uzbekistan

in Nanjing
- Competitors: 28 in 11 sports
- Medals Ranked 27th: Gold 2 Silver 3 Bronze 3 Total 8

Summer Youth Olympics appearances (overview)
- 2010; 2014; 2018

Uzbekistan competed at the 2014 Summer Youth Olympics, in Nanjing, China from 16 August to 28 August 2014.

== Boxing ==
Uzbekistan qualified three boxers based on its performance at the 2014 AIBA Youth World Championships

Boys

Athlete	Event	Preliminaries	Semifinals	Final / RM	Rank
Athlete	Event	Opposition Result	Opposition Result	Opposition Result	Rank
Sulaymon Latipov	-49 kg	Bye	Murata (JPN); W 2-1	Huseynov (AZE); L 0-3	2nd place, silver medalist(s)
Bektemir Melikuziev	-69 kg	Bye	Adzinayeu (BLR); W TKO	Solano (DOM); W 3-0	1st place, gold medalist(s)
Kozimbek Mardonov	-75 kg	Kallioinen (FIN); W 3-0	Gadzhyiev (UKR); L 1-2	Bronze Medal Bout Plantić (CRO); L 0-3	4

== Canoeing ==
Uzbekistan qualified one boat based on its performance at the 2013 World Junior Canoe Sprint and Slalom Championships.

Boys

Athlete	Event	Qualification		Round of 16		Quarterfinals	Semifinals	Final / BM	Rank
Athlete	Event	Time	Rank	Time	Rank	Opposition Result	Opposition Result	Opposition Result	Rank
Artur Guliev	C1 slalom								
Artur Guliev	C1 sprint					George Vasile (ROU); W		Krystof Hajek (CZE); L	4

== Gymnastics ==
=== Artistic Gymnastics ===
Uzbekistan qualified two athletes based on its performance at the 2014 Asian Artistic Gymnastics Championships.

Boys

Athlete	Event	Apparatus						Total	Rank
Athlete	Event	F	PH	R	V	PB	HB	Total	Rank
Timur Kadirov	Qualification	11.450 30	13.700 6 Q	11.450 33	14.100 14	11.350 32	11.600 30	73.650	29
Timur Kadirov	Pommel Horse	—						13.800	3rd place, bronze medalist(s)

Girls

Athlete	Event	Apparatus				Total	Rank
Athlete	Event	F	V	UB	BB	Total	Rank
Veronika Orlova	Qualification	12.200	13.700	10.150	11.850	47.900	21

=== Rhythmic Gymnastics ===
Uzbekistan qualified one individual and one team based on its performance at the 2014 Asian Rhythmic Championships.

Individual

Athlete	Event	Qualification						Final					
Athlete	Event	Hoop	Ball	Clubs	Ribbon	Total	Rank	Hoop	Ball	Clubs	Ribbon	Total	Rank
Anora Davlyatova	Individual	13.350	13.150	14.000	13.225	53.725	8 Q	13.200	13.500	13.000	12.775	52.475	8

Team

Athletes	Event	Qualification				Final			
Athletes	Event	4 Hoops	4 Ribbons	Total	Rank	4 Hoops	4 Ribbons	Total	Rank
Sabrina Ramazanova; Gyuzal Raymanova; Komilabonu Rustamova; Irina Saleh; Karina Tagaeva	Team	13.100	11.600	24.700	3 Q	11.850	12.850	24.700	4

=== Trampoline ===
Uzbekistan qualified one athlete based on its performance at the 2014 Asian Trampoline Championships.

Athlete	Event	Qualification				Final	
Athlete	Event	Routine 1	Routine 2	Total	Rank	Score	Rank
Amiran Babayan	Boys	43.345 8	11.980 12	55.325	11	did not advance	

== Judo ==
Uzbekistan qualified one athlete based on its performance at the 2013 Cadet World Judo Championships.

Individual

Athlete	Event	Round of 32	Round of 16	Quarterfinals	Semifinals	Rep 1	Rep 2	Rep 3	Rep 4	Final / BM	Rank
Athlete	Event	Opposition Result	Opposition Result	Opposition Result	Opposition Result	Opposition Result	Opposition Result	Opposition Result	Opposition Result	Opposition Result	Rank
Sukhrob Tursunov	Boys' -66 kg	—	Tarapanov (BUL); W 100-000	Iadov (UKR); L 001-100	Did not advance	—		Minkou (BLR); W 100-000	Dermishyan (ARM); W 110-000	Sancho (CRC); W 010-000	3rd place, bronze medalist(s)

Team

Athletes	Event	Round of 16	Quarterfinals	Semifinals	Final	Rank
Athletes	Event	Opposition Result	Opposition Result	Opposition Result	Opposition Result	Rank
Team Rouge; Morgane Duchene (FRA); Ayelén Elizeche (ARG); Adrian Gandia (PUR); Mikhail Igolnikov (RUS); Lisa Millenberg (NED); Maria Siderot (POR); Sukhrob Tursunov (UZB)	Mixed Team	Team Kano (MIX); W 5-2	Team Ruska (MIX); W 5-2	Team Xian (MIX); W 4-3	Team Geesink (MIX); W 4-2	1st place, gold medalist(s)

== Rowing ==
Uzbekistan qualified two boats based on its performance at the Asian Qualification Regatta.

Athlete	Event	Heats		Repechage		Semifinals		Final	
Athlete	Event	Time	Rank	Time	Rank	Time	Rank	Time	Rank
Shakhboz Abdujabborov	Boys' Single Sculls								
Yulduz Kulgovaya	Girls' Single Sculls								

Qualification Legend: FA=Final A (medal); FB=Final B (non-medal); FC=Final C (non-medal); FD=Final D (non-medal); SA/B=Semifinals A/B; SC/D=Semifinals C/D; R=Repechage

== Shooting ==
Uzbekistan qualified two shooters based on its performance at the 2014 Asian Shooting Championships.

Individual

Athlete	Event	Qualification		Final	
Athlete	Event	Points	Rank	Points	Rank
Vadim Skorovarov	Boys' 10m Air Rifle	613.9	8 Q	152.9	4
Vladimir Svechnikov	Boys' 10m Air Pistol	566	8 Q	117.6	6

Team

Athletes	Event	Qualification		Round of 16	Quarterfinals	Semifinals	Final / BM	Rank
Athletes	Event	Points	Rank	Opposition Result	Opposition Result	Opposition Result	Opposition Result	Rank
Vadim Skorovarov (UZB); Ana Ivanovska (MKD)	Mixed Team 10m Air Rifle	805.0	18	did not advance				
Vladimir Svechnikov (UZB); Lidia Nencheva (BUL)	Mixed Team 10m Air Pistol		Q		Ceper (SLO); Deswal (IND); W 10 - 5	Igityan (ARM); Chung (TPE); W 10 - 8	Mohamed (EGY); Teh (SGP); W 10 - 5	1st place, gold medalist(s)

== Swimming ==
Uzbekistan qualified two swimmers.

Boys

Athlete	Event	Heat		Semifinal		Final	
Athlete	Event	Time	Rank	Time	Rank	Time	Rank
Artyom Pulhnatiy	100 m freestyle	52.78	31	did not advance			
Artyom Pulhnatiy	200 m individual medley	2:07.68	16	—		did not advance	
Andrey Pravdivtsev	50 m breaststroke	28.90	10 Q	29.07	13	did not advance	
Andrey Pravdivtsev	100 m breaststroke	1:03.99	21	did not advance			

== Table Tennis ==
Uzbekistan qualified one athlete based on its performance at the Asian qualifying event.

Singles

Athlete	Event	Group Stage	Rank	Round of 16	Quarterfinals	Semifinals	Final / BM	Rank
Athlete	Event	Opposition Score	Rank	Opposition Score	Opposition Score	Opposition Score	Opposition Score	Rank
Regina Kim	Girls	Group D Zarif (FRA)						
Regina Kim	Girls	Park (KOR)						
Regina Kim	Girls	Zhang (USA); L 0 - 3						

Team

Athletes	Event	Group Stage	Rank	Round of 16	Quarterfinals	Semifinals	Final / BM	Rank
Athletes	Event	Opposition Score	Rank	Opposition Score	Opposition Score	Opposition Score	Opposition Score	Rank
Asia 1 Regina Kim (UZB); Abdulrahman Al-Naggar (QAT)	Mixed	Group A China; Liu (CHN); Fan (CHN); L 0-3	qB			United States; Zhang (USA); Avvari (USA); L 0 - 2	did not advance	19
Asia 1 Regina Kim (UZB); Abdulrahman Al-Naggar (QAT)	Mixed	Poland; Bajor (POL); Zatowka (POL)	qB			United States; Zhang (USA); Avvari (USA); L 0 - 2	did not advance	19

Qualification Legend: Q=Main Bracket (medal); qB=Consolation Bracket (non-medal)

== Taekwondo ==
Uzbekistan qualified one athlete based on its performance at the Taekwondo Qualification Tournament.

Girls

Athlete	Event	Round of 16	Quarterfinals	Semifinals	Final	Rank
Athlete	Event	Opposition Result	Opposition Result	Opposition Result	Opposition Result	Rank
Umida Abdullaeva	+63 kg	Bye	Munave (SWZ); W 17 - 3	Li (CHN); W 1 - 0	Yount (USA); L 2 - 4	2nd place, silver medalist(s)

== Weightlifting ==
Uzbekistan qualified 2 quotas in the boys' events based on the team ranking after the 2013 Weightlifting Youth World Championships. Later Uzbekistan would qualify 1 quota in the girls' events based on the team ranking after the 2014 Weightlifting Youth & Junior Asian Championships.

Boys

Athlete	Event	Snatch		Clean & jerk		Total	Rank
Athlete	Event	Result	Rank	Result	Rank	Total	Rank
Adkhamjon Ergashev	−56 kg	110	2	133	3	243	3rd place, bronze medalist(s)
Farhodbek Sobirov	−85 kg	147	2	174	3	321	2nd place, silver medalist(s)

Girls

Athlete	Event	Snatch		Clean & jerk		Total	Rank
Athlete	Event	Result	Rank	Result	Rank	Total	Rank
Kamila Abdullaeva	+63 kg	88	8	107	9	195	9

== Wrestling ==
Uzbekistan qualified three athletes based on its performance at the 2014 Asian Cadet Championships.

Key:
- VT - Victory by Fall.
- PP - Decision by Points - the loser with technical points.
- PO - Decision by Points - the loser without technical points.

Boys

Athlete	Event	Group stage				Final / RM	Rank
Athlete	Event	Opposition Score	Opposition Score	Opposition Score	Rank	Opposition Score	Rank
Ilkhom Bakhromov	Greco-Roman -50kg	Bounasri (ALG); W 4 – 0	Correa (BRA); W 4 – 0	Muller (MHL); W 4 – 0	1 Q	Najafov (AZE); W 3-1 ^{PP}	1st place, gold medalist(s)
Abubakr Alimov	Greco-Roman -69kg	Dadov (AZE); L 0-3 ^{PP}	Ibrahim (EGY); L 0-3 ^{PO}	Polidavov (KAZ); L 0-3 ^{PO}	4 Q	Marshall (NZL)	

Girls

Athlete	Event	Group stage				Final / RM	Rank
Athlete	Event	Opposition Score	Opposition Score	Opposition Score	Rank	Opposition Score	Rank
Shakhodat Djullibaeva	Freestyle -52kg	Dorn (CAM); W 4-0	Mukaida (JPN); L 0-4	Ismali (EGY); L	3 Q	Kennett (CAN); W 4-1 ^{ST}	5

== See also ==
- Uzbekistan at the 2014 Winter Olympics
