= Table tennis at the 2014 Summer Youth Olympics – Girls' singles =

Women's singles table tennis at the II Summer Youth Olympic Games
- Venue: Riocentro
- Date: 17–20 August 2014
- Competitors: 32 from 32 nations

Medalists
1st place, gold medalist(s)		Liu Gaoyang	China
2nd place, silver medalist(s)		Doo Hoi Kem	Hong Kong
3rd place, bronze medalist(s)		Lily Zhang	United States

The girls' singles table tennis event was part of the programme at the 2014 Summer Youth Olympics took place in the Wutaishan Sports Center in Nanjing from 17 to 20 August 2014.

Liu Gaoyang won the event, with Doo Hoi Kem and Lily Zhang coming second and third respectively.

== Schedule ==
Dates	Start time	Round
August 17	10:00	Group Stage
August 17	16:00	Group Stage
August 18	10:00	Group Stage
August 18	16:00	1/8 Finals
August 19	16:00	Quarterfinals
August 19	10:00	Semifinals
August 20	15:00	Bronze medal match
August 20	15:00	Gold medal match

== Round One ==
=== Group A ===
Athlete	Pld	W	L	Games	Points
Doo Hoi Kem (HKG)	3	3	0	9-0	99-41
Gremlis Arvelo (VEN)	3	2	1	6-5	98-100
Kristýna Štefcová (CZE)	3	1	2	5-6	95–98
Florence Seera (UGA)	3	0	3	0-9	46–99

=== Group B ===
Athlete	Pld	W	L	Games	Points
Liu Gaoyang (CHN)	3	3	0	9-1	108-52
Sutirtha Mukherjee (IND)	3	2	1	7-4	106-90
Giorgia Piccolin (ITA)	3	1	2	4-6	85–82
Fatouma Ali Salah (DJI)	3	0	3	0-9	24–99

=== Group C ===
Athlete	Pld	W	L	Games	Points
Miyu Kato (JPN)	3	3	0	9-1	107-69
Lisa Lung (BEL)	3	2	1	7-4	107-88
Leila Imre (HUN)	3	1	2	3-6	74–78
Sophia Dong (NZL)	3	0	3	1-9	53–106

=== Group D ===
Athlete	Pld	W	L	Games	Points
Lily Zhang (USA)	3	3	0	9-2	117-83
Park Se-Ri (KOR)	3	2	1	7-4	111-93
Leila Imre (FRA)	3	1	2	5-7	108–110
Regina Kim (UZB)	3	0	3	1-9	58–108

=== Group E ===
Athlete	Pld	W	L	Games	Points
Chiu Ssu-hua (TPE)	3	2	1	8-5	124-100
Nicole Trosman (ISR)	3	2	1	8-5	128-111
Alaa Saad El-Halawany (EGY)	3	2	1	8-5	116–108
Vy Bui (AUS)	3	0	3	0-9	58–108

=== Group F ===
Athlete	Pld	W	L	Games	Points
Lea Rakovac (CRO)	3	2	1	7-3	92-72
Karoline Mischek (AUT)	3	2	1	7-4	104-86
Natalia Bajor (POL)	3	2	1	6-4	93–81
Chelsea Edghill (GUY)	3	0	3	0-9	49–99

=== Group G ===
Athlete	Pld	W	L	Games	Points
Adina Diaconu (ROM)	3	3	0	9-2	119-73
María Pia Lorenzotti (URU)	3	2	1	7-7	133-120
Yuan Wan (GER)	3	1	2	5-7	89–112
Yuliya Ryabova (KAZ)	3	0	3	4-9	95–131

=== Group H ===
Athlete	Pld	W	L	Games	Points
Tamolwan Khetkhuan (THA)	3	3	0	9-0	102-58
María Pia Lorenzotti (URU)	3	2	1	6-3	90-82
Sannah Lagsir (ALG)	3	1	2	3-7	85–99
Yee Herng Hwee (SGP)	3	0	3	1-9	69–107

== Round Two ==
=== Finals ===
1/8 Finals
(Hong Kong) Doo Hoi Kem	4
(Israel) Nicole Trosman	0
(Romania) Adina Diaconu	4
(Austria) Karoline Mischek	0
(United States) Lily Zhang	4
(Belgium) Lisa Lung	2
(Thailand) Tamolwan Khetkhuan	4
(India) Sutirtha Mukherjee	2
(Japan) Miyu Kato	4
(Uruguay) María Pia Lorenzotti	1
(Croatia) Lea Rakovac	4
(Venezuela) Gremlis Arvelo	1
(China) Liu Gaoyang	4
(Canada) Anqi Luo	0
(Chinese Taipei) Chiu Ssu-Hua	4
(South Korea) Park Se-Ri	3

Quarterfinals
(Japan) Miyu Kato	4
(Romania) Adina Diaconu	1
(United States) Lily Zhang	4
(Thailand) Tamolwan Khetkhuan	1
(Japan) Miyu Kato	4
(Croatia) Lea Rakovac	1
(China) Liu Gaoyang	4
(Chinese Taipei) Chiu Ssu-hua	2

Semifinals
(Hong Kong) Doo Hoi Kem	4
(United States) Lily Zhang	1
(Japan) Miyu Kato	1
(China) Liu Gaoyang	4

Gold medal match
1st place, gold medalist(s)	(China) Liu Gaoyang	4
2nd place, silver medalist(s)	(Hong Kong) Doo Hoi Kem	1
Bronze medal match
3rd place, bronze medalist(s)	(United States) Lily Zhang	4
4	(Japan) Miyu Kato	1

=== Consolation ===
1/8 Finals
(Poland) Natalia Bajor	3
(Australia) Vy Bui	1
(Italy) Giorgia Piccolin	Walkover
(Uganda) Florence Seera	Walkover
(Algeria) Sannah Lagsir	3
(Uzbekistan) Regina Kim	1
(Hungary) Leila Imre	3
(Kazakhstan) Yuliya Ryabova	0
(France) Audrey Zarif	Walkover
(Guyana) Chelsea Edghill	Walkover
(Germany) Yuan Wan	3
(Singapore) Yee Herng Hwee	1
(Czech Republic) Kristýna Štefcová	3
(New Zealand) Sophia Dong	0
(Egypt) Alaa Saad El-Halawany	4
(Eritrea) Fatouma Ali Salah	3

Quarterfinals
(Poland) Natalia Bajor	1
(Italy) Giorgia Piccolin	3
(Algeria) Sannah Lagsir	1
(Hungary) Leila Imre	3
(France) Audrey Zarif	0
(Germany) Yuan Wan	3
(Czech Republic) Kristýna Štefcová	3
(Egypt) Alaa Saad El-Halawany	1

Semifinals
(Italy) Giorgia Piccolin	3
(Hungary) Leila Imre	2
(Germany) Yuan Wan	3
(Czech Republic) Kristýna Štefcová	1

Final
(Italy) Giorgia Piccolin	0
(Germany) Yuan Wan	3
