= Weightlifting at the 2014 Summer Youth Olympics – Boys' 85 kg =

Boys' 85 at the II Summer Youth Olympic Games
- Venue: Nanjing International Expo Center
- Dates: August 22, 2014
- Competitors: 5 from 5 nations
- Winning total weight: 355kg

Medalists
1st place, gold medalist(s)		Khetag Khugaev	Russia
2nd place, silver medalist(s)		Farkhodbek Sobirov	Uzbekistan
3rd place, bronze medalist(s)		Mohamed Shosha	Egypt

The boys' 85 kg weightlifting event was the second men's event at the weightlifting competition at the 2014 Summer Youth Olympics, with competitors limited to a maximum of 85 kilograms of body mass.

Each lifter performed in both the snatch and clean and jerk lifts, with the final score being the sum of the lifter's best result in each. The athlete received three attempts in each of the two lifts; the score for the lift was the heaviest weight successfully lifted.

== Results ==
Rank	Name	Body Weight	Snatch (kg)				Clean & Jerk (kg)				Total (kg)
Rank	Name	Body Weight	1	2	3	Res	1	2	3	Res	Total (kg)
1st place, gold medalist(s)	Khetag Khugaev (RUS)	83.75	150	157	164	164	180	191	~~201~~	191	355
2nd place, silver medalist(s)	Farkhodbek Sobirov (UZB)	83.93	140	145	147	147	170	174	~~177~~	174	321
3rd place, bronze medalist(s)	Mohamed Shosha (EGY)	84.88	~~140~~	140	~~144~~	140	~~178~~	~~178~~	178	178	318
4	Reza Beiranvand (IRI)	83.37	139	~~144~~	144	144	169	173	~~177~~	173	317
5	Hwang Seung-hwan (KOR)	83.61	135	~~140~~	~~140~~	135	160	165	~~170~~	165	300
