= San Marino at the 2014 Summer Youth Olympics =

- IOC code: SMR
- NOC: San Marino National Olympic Committee
- Website: www.cons.sm

in Nanjing
- Competitors: 3 in 2 sports
- Medals: Gold 0 Silver 0 Bronze 0 Total 0

Summer Youth Olympics appearances
- 2010; 2014; 2018

San Marino competed at the 2014 Summer Youth Olympics, in Nanjing, China from 16 August to 28 August 2014.

== Shooting ==
San Marino was given a quota to compete by the tripartite committee.

Individual

Athlete	Event	Qualification		Final	
Athlete	Event	Points	Rank	Points	Rank
Agata Riccardi	Girls' 10m Air Rifle	401.4	16	did not advance	

Team

Athletes	Event	Qualification		Round of 16	Quarterfinals	Semifinals	Final / BM	Rank
Athletes	Event	Points	Rank	Opposition Result	Opposition Result	Opposition Result	Opposition Result	Rank
Agata Riccardi (SMR); Andrija Milovanovic (SRB)	Mixed Team 10m Air Rifle	821.2	6 Q	M Veloso (SIN); D Clopatofsky (AUS); W 10 – 8	I Babic (CRO); S Laurens (RSA); W 10 – 6	H Mekhimar (EGY); I Peni (HUN); L 5 – 10	V Sukhorukova (UKR); S Lu (TPE); L 6 – 10	4

== Swimming ==
San Marino qualified two swimmers.

Boys

Athlete	Event	Heat		Semifinal		Final	
Athlete	Event	Time	Rank	Time	Rank	Time	Rank
Davide Bernardi	50 m freestyle	25.53	36	did not advance			
Davide Bernardi	50 m backstroke	28.19	27	did not advance			

Girls

Athlete	Event	Heat		Final	
Athlete	Event	Time	Rank	Time	Rank
Elena Giovannini	200 m freestyle	2:08.27	31	did not advance	
Elena Giovannini	400 m freestyle	4:31.97	28	did not advance	
