= Rachel Schmidt =

New Zealand trampoline gymnast

- Born: 2 December 1994 (age 31)

Gymnastics career
- Discipline: Trampoline gymnastics
- Country represented: New Zealand (2011)
- Relatives: Dylan Schmidt (brother)

Rachel Schmidt (born 2 December 1994) is a New Zealand individual trampolinist, representing her nation at international competitions. She competed at world championships, including at the 2011 Trampoline World Championships.

Her brothers Callum Schmidt and Dylan Schmidt have also competed internationally in trampolining.
