= Gymnastics at the 2014 Summer Youth Olympics – Boys' trampoline =

Boys' trampoline events at the Olympics

Boys’ trampoline at the II Summer Youth Olympic Games
- Venue: Nanjing OSC Gymnasium
- Date: 22 August
- Competitors: 12 from 12 nations

Medalists
1st place, gold medalist(s)		Dylan Schmidt	New Zealand
2nd place, silver medalist(s)		Liu Changxin	China
3rd place, bronze medalist(s)		Pedro Ribeiro Ferreira	Portugal

The Boys’ trampoline competition at the 2014 Summer Youth Olympics was held on 22 August 2014. The event took place in Nanjing Olympic Sport Complex Gymnasium, Nanjing, China. There are 12 contestants from 12 different NOCs competing in this event.

== Qualification ==
Order	Athlete	1st Routine		2nd Routine		Total	
Order	Athlete	Score	Rank	Score	Rank	Score	Rank
1	Liu Changxin (CHN)	45.605	1	57.260	1	102.865	1 Q
2	Luis Loria Cetina (MEX)	45.160	2	55.435	2	100.595	2 Q
3	Pirmammad Aliyev (KAZ)	43.950	7	54.980	3	98.930	3 Q
4	Dylan Schmidt (NZL)	44.525	4	53.560	4	98.085	4 Q
5	Zachary Sheridan (GBR)	43.190	9	52.470	5	95.660	5 Q
6	Artsiom Zhuk (BLR)	44.810	4	50.565	7	95.375	6 Q
7	Pedro Ribeiro Ferreira (POR)	44.380	5	50.510	8	94.890	7 Q
8	Colin Duda (USA)	40.800	10	50.610	6	91.410	8 Q
9	Dmitriy Zenkin (RUS)	44.050	6	21.665	9	65.715	9 R
10	Mohab Ayman Hassan (EGY)	38.130	12	19.710	10	57.840	10 R
11	Amiran Babayan (UZB)	43.345	8	11.980	12	55.325	11
12	Reinhardt van Zyl (NAM)	39.450	11	14.120	11	53.570	12

Notes: Q=Qualified to Final; R=Reserve

== Final ==
Rank	Athlete	Difficulty	Execution	Flight	Penalty	Total
1st place, gold medalist(s)	Dylan Schmidt (NZL)	15.400	24.600	17.340	0.000	57.340
2nd place, silver medalist(s)	Liu Changxin (CHN)	14.600	24.600	17.735	0.000	56.935
3rd place, bronze medalist(s)	Pedro Ribeiro Ferreira (POR)	15.400	23.100	17.540	0.000	56.040
4	Luis Loria Cetina (MEX)	15.400	24.000	16.415	0.000	55.815
5	Artsiom Zhuk (BLR)	15.000	22.200	17.215	0.000	54.415
6	Zachary Sheridan (GBR)	3.200	4.800	3.000	0.000	11.000
7	Pirmammad Aliyev (KAZ)	1.500	2.400	1.875	0.000	5.775
8	Colin Duda (USA)	1.700	2.100	1.890	0.000	5.690
