= Ahmed Mohamed (sport shooter) =

Egyptian sport shooter (born 1996)

Personal information
- Nationality: Egypt
- Born: 8 April 1996 (age 30) Cairo, Egypt
- Height: 1.76 m (5 ft 9 in)
- Weight: 62 kg (137 lb)

Sport
- Sport: Shooting
- Event: 10 m air pistol (AP60)
Medal record
Men's shooting
Representing Egypt
Summer Youth Olympics
Silver medal – second place	2014 Nanjing	Mixed team

Ahmed Mohamed (Arabic: أحمد الكردى; born 8 April 1996) is an Egyptian sport shooter. He won a gold medal in air pistol shooting at the 2015 African Championships and shared a runner-up prize with Singapore's Teh Xiu Yi in the mixed international pistol team at the 2014 Summer Youth Olympics.

Mohamed made his first Olympic team for Egypt as an eighteen-year-old at the 2014 Summer Youth Olympics in Nanjing, China, where he earned a silver medal in shooting. In his first event, the boys' 10 m air pistol, Mohamed fired a score of 551 points to place fourteenth from a field of twenty, but missed out a chance to compete for the final. Three days later, Mohamed and his Singaporean colleague Teh Xiu Yi rebounded from their early air pistol eliminations to take home the silver medal in the mixed pistol team competition, losing the final match 5–10 to the Eurasian duo of Lidia Nencheva (Bulgaria) and Vladimir Svechnikov.

He also competed for Egypt at the 2016 Summer Olympics in the men's 10 metre air pistol event.
