= Swimming at the 2014 Summer Youth Olympics – Boys' 400 metre freestyle =

Boys' 400 metre freestyle at the 2014 Summer Youth Olympics
- Venue: Nanjing Olympic Sports Centre
- Dates: 17 August
- Competitors: 31 from 28 nations
- Winning time: 3:49.76

Medalists
gold medal	Mykhailo Romanchuk	Ukraine
silver medal	Marcelo Acosta	El Salvador
bronze medal	Henrik Christiansen	Norway

The boys' 400 metre freestyle event in swimming at the 2014 Summer Youth Olympics took place on 17 August at the Nanjing Olympic Sports Centre in Nanjing, China.

== Results ==
=== Heats ===
The heats were held at 10:00.

Rank	Heat	Lane	Name	Nationality	Time	Notes
1	4	3	Ahmed Akram	Egypt	3:52.02	Q
2	4	4	Wojciech Wojdak	Poland	3:52.80	Q
3	3	8	Marcelo Acosta	El Salvador	3:53.14	Q
4	2	2	Mykhailo Romanchuk	Ukraine	3:53.31	Q
5	4	7	Ido Haber	Israel	3:53.45	Q
6	4	5	Henrik Christiansen	Norway	3:53.58	Q
7	3	3	Luiz Altamir Melo	Brazil	3:53.79	Q
8	3	4	Guillermo Sánchez	Spain	3:55.32	Q
9	3	5	Povilas Strazdas	Lithuania	3:55.62	
10	3	6	Nils Liess	Switzerland	3:55.66	
11	4	8	Welson Sim	Malaysia	3:55.72	
12	2	1	Patrick Ransford	United States	3:56.31	
13	4	2	Marc Vivas	Spain	3:56.35	
14	4	6	Brent Szurdoki	South Africa	3:56.84	
15	4	1	Rahiti De Vos	France	3:56.88	
16	2	7	Alexei Sancov	Moldova	3:56.89	
17	3	7	Michael Mincham	New Zealand	3:57.33	
18	2	5	Sven Saemundsson	Croatia	3:57.55	
19	2	8	Ricardo Vargas	Mexico	3:58.55	
20	2	4	Yudai Amada	Japan	4:00.03	
21	2	6	Rafael Gil	Portugal	4:00.11	
22	3	1	Marc Hinawi	Israel	4:01.38	
23	1	5	Grega Popović	Slovenia	4:01.69	
24	3	2	Martyn Walton	Great Britain	4:02.40	
25	1	3	Colin Gilbert	Canada	4:02.51	
26	1	2	Sebastian Steffan	Austria	4:03.34	
27	2	3	André Farinha	Portugal	4:06.13	
28	1	4	Anthony Selby	Barbados	4:06.24	
29	1	1	Stefan Jankulovski	Macedonia	4:10.71	
30	1	7	Pol Arias	Andorra	4:11.13	
31	1	6	Luis Vega Torres	Cuba	4:11.37	

=== Final ===
The final was held at 18:00.

Rank	Lane	Name	Nationality	Time	Notes
1st place, gold medalist(s)	6	Mykhailo Romanchuk	Ukraine	3:49.76	
2nd place, silver medalist(s)	3	Marcelo Acosta	El Salvador	3:51.32	
3rd place, bronze medalist(s)	7	Henrik Christiansen	Norway	3:51.55	
4	4	Ahmed Akram	Egypt	3:51.78	
5	2	Ido Haber	Israel	3:53.55	
6	5	Wojciech Wojdak	Poland	3:53.96	
7	1	Luiz Altamir Melo	Brazil	3:55.07	
8	8	Guillermo Sánchez	Spain	3:56.08	
