= Athletics at the 2014 Summer Youth Olympics – Girls' high jump =

Athletics – Girls' high jump at the II Summer Youth Olympic Games
- Venue: Nanjing Olympic Sports Centre
- Date: August 21–24
- Competitors: 16 from 16 nations

Medalists
1st place, gold medalist(s)		Yuliya Levchenko	Ukraine
2nd place, silver medalist(s)		Nawal Meniker	France
3rd place, bronze medalist(s)		Michaela Hrubá	Czech Republic

The girls’ high jump competition at the 2014 Summer Youth Olympics was held on 21–24 August 2014 in Nanjing Olympic Sports Center.

== Schedule ==
Date	Time	Round
21 August 2014	18:50	Qualification
24 August 2014	19:30	Final

== Results ==
=== Qualification ===
The top 8 jumpers qualified to the Final A, while the other jumpers competed in the Final B.

Rank	Athlete	1.60	1.65	1.70	1.74	1.78	Result	Notes	Q
1	Michaela Hrubá (CZE)	-	-	o	o	o	1.78		FA
1	Yuliya Levchenko (UKR)	-	o	o	o	o	1.78		FA
1	Lara Omerzu (SLO)	-	o	o	o	o	1.78		FA
4	Lee Ching-Ching (TPE)	o	o	o	xo	o	1.78	PB	FA
4	Petra Luterán (HUN)	-	o	xo	o	o	1.78		FA
6	Selina Schulenburg (GER)	-	o	xo	xo	o	1.78		FA
7	Nawal Meniker (FRA)	-	o	o	o	xo	1.78		FA
8	Elodie Tshilumba (LUX)	-	-	o	o	xxo	1.78		FA
9	Ximena Lizbeth Esquivel (MEX)	-	o	o	o	xxx	1.74		FB
9	Salome Lang (SUI)	-	o	o	o	xxx	1.74		FB
11	Nicole Robinson (AUS)	-	o	o	xo	xxx	1.74		FB
11	Julija Tarvide (LAT)	-	o	o	xo	xxx	1.74		FB
13	Riham Abohida (EGY)	xo	o	xo	xxx		1.70		FB
14	Janae Moffitt (USA)	o	o	xxx			1.65		FB
15	Yousra Arar (ALG)	o	xxx				1.60		FB
	Claire Orcel (BEL)						DNS		FB

=== Finals ===
==== Final A ====
Rank	Final Placing	Athlete	1.67	1.71	1.75	1.78	1.81	1.83	1.85	1.87	1.89	Result	Notes
1st place, gold medalist(s)	1	Yuliya Levchenko (UKR)	o	o	o	o	o	xo	o	xxo	xo	1.89	PB
2nd place, silver medalist(s)	2	Nawal Meniker (FRA)	-	o	o	xo	o	xxo	xxo	o	xxx	1.87	PB
3rd place, bronze medalist(s)	3	Michaela Hrubá (CZE)	-	o	o	o	xxo	o	xo	xx-	x	1.85	
4	4	Petra Luterán (HUN)	o	o	o	o	xxo	xxx				1.81	
5	5	Elodie Tshilumba (LUX)	-	o	o	xo	xxo	xxx				1.81	
6	6	Selina Schulenburg (GER)	xo	o	xxo	o	xxx					1.78	
7	7	Lara Omerzu (SLO)	-	o	o	xxx						1.75	
8	8	Lee Ching-Ching (TPE)	o	o	xxxo	xxx						1.75	

==== Final B ====
Rank	Final Placing	Athlete	1.62	1.66	1.70	1.73	1.76	11.76	1.74	1.72	Result	Notes
1	9	Julija Tarvide (LAT)	-	o	o	o	xxx	x	x	o	1.73	
2	10	Janae Moffitt (USA)	o	o	o	o	xxx	x	x	x	1.73	
3	11	Ximena Lizbeth Esquivel (MEX)	-	o	xo	o	xxx				1.73	
4	12	Nicole Robinson (AUS)	-	xo	xo	xo	xxx				1.73	
5	13	Salome Lang (SUI)	-	o	o	xxo	xxx				1.73	
6	14	Riham Abohida (EGY)	xo	xo	xxr						1.66	
		Yousra Arar (ALG)	r								NM	
		Claire Orcel (BEL)									DNS	
