= Macedonia at the 2014 Summer Youth Olympics =

- IOC code: MKD
- NOC: Macedonian Olympic Committee
- Website: www.mok.org.mk

in Nanjing
- Competitors: 5 in 4 sports
- Medals: Gold 0 Silver 0 Bronze 0 Total 0

Summer Youth Olympics appearances
- 2010; 2014; 2018

Macedonia competed at the 2014 Summer Youth Olympics in Nanjing, China, from 16 August to 28 August 2014.

== Cycling ==
Macedonia qualified a boys' team based on its ranking issued by the UCI.

Team

| Athletes | Event | Cross-Country Eliminator | | Time Trial | | | BMX | | Cross-Country Race | | | Road Race | | | Total Pts | Rank |
| Athletes | Event | Rank | Points | Time | Rank | Points | Rank | Points | Time | Rank | Points | Time | Rank | Points | Total Pts | Rank |
|---|---|---|---|---|---|---|---|---|---|---|---|---|---|---|---|---|
| Jovan Jovanoski; Andrej Petrovski | Boys' Team | 24 | 0 | 5:17.41 | 9 | 15 | 28 | 0 | -2 LAP | 21 | 0 | 1:37:23; 1:37:23 | 6; 15 | 32 | 47 | 15 |

Mixed Relay

| Athletes | Event | Cross-Country Girls' Race | Cross-Country Boys' Race | Boys' Road Race | Girls' Road Race | Total Time | Rank |
|---|---|---|---|---|---|---|---|
| Ema Manikaite (LTU); Jovan Jovanoski (MKD); Andrej Petrovski (MKD); Ernesta Strainyte (LTU) | Mixed Team Relay | 3:40 | 3:00 | 5:16 | 6:20 | 18:16 | 7 |

== Shooting ==
Macedonia was given a quota to compete by the tripartite committee.

Individual

| Athlete | Event | Qualification | | Final | |
| Athlete | Event | Points | Rank | Points | Rank |
|---|---|---|---|---|---|
| Ana Ivanovska | Girls' 10m Air Rifle | 400.9 | 17 | did not advance | |

Team

| Athletes | Event | Qualification | | Round of 16 | Quarterfinals | Semifinals | Final / BM | Rank |
| Athletes | Event | Points | Rank | Opposition Result | Opposition Result | Opposition Result | Opposition Result | Rank |
|---|---|---|---|---|---|---|---|---|
| Ana Ivanovska (MKD); Vadim Skorovarov (UZB) | Mixed Team 10m Air Rifle | 805.0 | 18 | did not advance | | | | |

== Swimming ==
Macedonia qualified one swimmer.

Boys

| Athlete | Event | Heat | | Final | |
| Athlete | Event | Time | Rank | Time | Rank |
|---|---|---|---|---|---|
| Stefan Jankulovski | 200 m freestyle | 1:58.46 | 30 | did not advance | |
| Stefan Jankulovski | 400 m freestyle | 4:10.71 | 29 | did not advance | |

== Wrestling ==
Macedonia was given a spot to compete from the Tripartite Commission.

Key:
- VT - Victory by Fall.
- PP - Decision by Points - the loser with technical points.
- PO - Decision by Points - the loser without technical points.

Boys

| Athlete | Event | Group stage | | | | Final / RM | Rank |
| Athlete | Event | Opposition Score | Opposition Score | Opposition Score | Rank | Opposition Score | Rank |
|---|---|---|---|---|---|---|---|
| Elmedin Sejfualau | Freestyle -54kg | D Fix (USA); L 0 – 4 ^{ST} | E Al-Shebami (YEM); W 3 – 1 ^{PP} | R Louw (RSA); L 0 – 4 ^{VT} | 4 Q | E Aular (VEN); W 3 – 1 | 7 |
