= Sofiya Zenchenko =

Ukrainian weightlifter

Personal information
- Full name: Sofiya Zenchenko
- Born: 10 July 1997 (age 29)
- Weight: 62.89 kg (138.6 lb)

Sport
- Country: Ukraine
- Sport: Weightlifting
- Weight class: 63 kg
- Updated on 9 November 2016

Sofiya Zenchenko (born 10 July 1997) is a Ukrainian weightlifter, who represented Ukraine at international competitions.

She won the bronze medal in the 63 kg category at the 2014 Summer Youth Olympics.

== Major results ==
Year	Venue	Weight	Snatch (kg)				Clean & Jerk (kg)				Total	Rank
Year	Venue	Weight	1	2	3	Rank	1	2	3	Rank	Total	Rank
Summer Youth Olympics
2014	Nanjing, China	63 kg	*88	~~88~~	88	---	112	118	120	---	208	3rd place, bronze medalist(s)
