= Hadir Mekhimar =

Egyptian sport shooter

Personal information
- Full name: Hadir Mekhimar
- Nationality: Egypt
- Born: 25 November 1997 (age 28) Cairo, Egypt
- Height: 1.60 m (5 ft 3 in)
- Weight: 50 kg (110 lb)

Sport
- Sport: Shooting
- Event: 10 m air rifle (AR40)
Medal record
Women's shooting
Representing (International Olympic Committee) Mixed-NOCs
Summer Youth Olympics
Gold medal – first place	2014 Nanjing	Mixed team

Hadir Mekhimar (Arabic: هدير مخيمر; born November 22, 1997, in Cairo) is an Egyptian sport shooter. She shared a top prize with Hungary's István Péni in the mixed international rifle team at the 2014 Summer Youth Olympics.

Mekhimar made her first Olympic team for Egypt as a 16-year-old at the 2014 Summer Youth Olympics in Nanjing, China, where she earned a gold medal in shooting. In her first event, the girls' 10 m air rifle, Mekhimar fired a decent score of 399.6 to attain an eighteenth place from a field of twenty, missing out a chance to compete for the final. Two days later, Mekhimar had atoned from her premature air rifle elimination to help Hungarian colleague István Péni strike a 10–2 victory over the Latin American duo of Fernanda Russo (Argentina) and José Santos Valdés (Mexico) in the gold medal match of the mixed rifle team competition.
