= Hannah Moore =

American swimmer

Personal information
- Nationality: American
- Born: August 22, 1996 (age 30)
- Height: 5 ft 7.5 in (171.5 cm)

Sport
- Sport: Swimming
- Events: 500, 1650 freestyle, 400 IM; 5K Open water swimming
- Strokes: Freestyle, Backstroke; Butterfly
- Club: Planters Walk Piranhas (Summer); TAC Titans, Cary NC
- College team: University of Michigan (2014-2015); North Carolina State (2016-2018)
- Coach: Todd DeSorbo (TAC Titans); John Payne (TAC Titans); Mike Bottom (Michigan); Braden Holloway (NCSU)
Medal record
World Championships
Bronze medal – third place	2019 Gwangju	5 km open water
World University Games
Bronze medal – third place	2017 Taipei	1500 m freestyle

Hannah Moore (born August 22, 1996) is an American swimmer, who competed in freestyle distance, stroke, and IM events at the University of Michigan and North Carolina State University and later specialized in open water events. In one of her best-known achievements, she competed in the women's 5 km event at the 2019 World Aquatics Championships, winning the bronze medal.

== Early life ==
Moore was born August 22, 1996, and grew up in Cary, North Carolina. She attended and swam for Cary's Green Hope High School, graduating in 2014. From a swimming family, both of her parents competed in swimming in High School, her father swam in college, and her sister Katie also swam for Green Hope High. At 15, she swam for the Planters Walk Piranhas summer swim league at the Triangle Swimming Association's summer meets, defeating Durant Hills swimming, in June, 2011. At the summer meet, demonstrating her multi-stroke skills at an early age, Hannah placed first in the medley relay, second in the breaststroke, third in the butterfly, and first in the freestyle relay.

By the end of her High School career at Green Hope High, she had earned state championship titles in swimming five times. Though she excelled in distance swimming in High School and college, she was a skilled multi-stroke swimmer as well, winning events in backstroke and individual medley. By 2014, as a High School Senior, she swam for the TAC Titans team under Head Coach Todd DeSorbo, a 2020 Assistant Coach at the Tokyo Olympics. With the Titans in 2014, as one of the nation's top swimmers in her age group, she frequently completed practices lasting over two hours.

A member of the U.S. National Team, in her youth, she captured two gold medals in Nanjing, China in the 2014 Youth Olympic Games in the 400 freestyle event and the 200 backstroke, and was a North Carolina state record holder in the freestyle event at 500 yards. In her Senior year at Green Hope, in the 500-yard event, she shattered the North Carolina NHSAA State record in the 500 freestyle by nearly six seconds with a time of 4:40.98. While in High School she qualified for the semi-finals of the 2012 Olympic trials in the 200 backstroke. In 2013, representing Green Hope High, she set an All-classifications North Carolina High School Athletic Association (NCHSAA) record of 54.37 at the Triangle Aquatic Center in Cary in the 100 backstroke, and also won the state championship in the 500 freestyle with a 4:447.66.

== Collegiate swimming ==
Moore attended the University of Michigan where she swam for Hall of Fame Head Coach Mike Bottom as a Freshman from 2014-15, where she qualified for NCAA competition in the 200 backstroke, the 500-yard freestyle, and the 400 IM. A coach who had formerly competed for USC, Bottom was particularly skilled in teaching freestyle technique, Moore's greatest strength, to his Michigan teams. A competent scholar in addition to her athletic achievements, Moore was an Academic All American in 2015 as well.

From 2014-2018, Moore attended and swam for North Carolina State University, where she was coached by Braden Holloway, who coached both the men's and women's programs beginning in 2011. At NC State, Moore received All American honors eight times which included the 500 freestyle, the 1650 freestyle and the 400 IM in 2016, the 500 freestyle and 1650 freestyle again in 2017, and the 400 IM, 1650 freestyle, and 500 freestyle in 2018 as a college Senior. Moore later attended graduate school, receiving a Masters.

== Long distance international career ==
In international swimming after graduating North Carolina State, she competed in the women's 5 km event at the 2019 World Aquatics Championships in Gwangju, South Korea, winning the bronze medal. She was a bronze medalist at the World University games in the 1500 meter swim. Earlier on August 14, 2018, she received a fifth place finish at the Pan Pacific Championships in the 10 km marathon swim in Chiba, Japan.

=== US Open Water National team ===
After graduating NC State, she prepared for Open Water swimming with the U.S. National team in 2018, where she trained with her former team, Cary, North Carolina's Triangle Aquatic Center (TAC) Titans Club. With the Titan Club in 2018, partly in preparation for the 2020 Olympics, she swam under Coach John Payne, a former competitor for the North Carolina State swim team. The TAC Titans team had a large membership, many coaches, and a large modern facility at the Triangle Aquatic Center. On August 14, 2018, she received a fifth place finish at the Pan Pacific Championships in the 10 km marathon swim in Chiba, Japan.

== Honors ==
At North Carolina State, Moore was the recipient of an Atlantic Coast Conference Scholarship for graduate studies. In April, 2018 at NC State, she was voted the Female Scholar Athlete of the Year for maintaining the highest grade point average, and in the same year was a recipient of the HC Kennett Award for the student who as an athlete performed and achieved the most in both academics and their sport.

Later living in Raleigh, North Carolina she studied Neuropathic Medicine at the National University of Natural Medicine.
