= Iryna Hlavnyk =

Ukrainian swimmer (born 1996)

Personal information
- Full name: Iryna Viktorivna Hlavnyk
- Born: 11 May 1996 (age 30) Kyiv, Ukraine
Medal record
Women's swimming
Representing Ukraine
European Junior Championships
Silver medal – second place	2012 Antwerp	200 m medley
Silver medal – second place	2012 Antwerp	200 m backstroke

Iryna Viktorivna Hlavnyk (born 11 May 1996 in Kyiv) is a Ukrainian swimmer. She competed in the 4 × 200 metre freestyle relay event at the 2012 Summer Olympics.

In 2014, she represented Ukraine at the 2014 Summer Youth Olympics held in Nanjing, China.
