= Lidia Nencheva =

Bulgarian sport shooter

Lidia Nencheva (Bulgarian: Лидия Ненчева, born in Plovdiv) is a Bulgarian sport shooter.

She has been a competitor for the Bulgarian team since 2010 and has won numerous tournaments on the national level. In August 2014, Nencheva won a gold medal at the mixed team event of the 2014 Summer Youth Olympics.
