= Junior World Artistic Gymnastics Championships – Girls' team all-around =

The Junior World Championships in artistic gymnastics were first held in 2019. Originally meant to be held every two years, the second edition of the event was not held until 2023 due to the COVID-19 pandemic.

Three medals are awarded: gold for first place, silver for second place, and bronze for third place. Tie breakers were used in the first year of the event but were not used subsequently.

== Medalists ==
Year	Location	Gold	Silver	Bronze	Ref
2019	(Hungary) Győr	(Russia) Russia; Elena Gerasimova; Viktoria Listunova; Vladislava Urazova; Yana Vorona	(China) China; Guan Chenchen; Ou Yushan; Wei Xiaoyuan; Wu Ran	(United States) United States; Sydney Barros; Skye Blakely; Kayla DiCello; Konnor McClain	
2023	(Turkey) Antalya	(Japan) Japan; Mika Mizuno; Haruka Nakamura; Sara Yamaguchi; Saki Kawakami	(United States) United States; Jayla Hang; Hezly Rivera; Izzy Stassi; Kieryn Finnell	(Italy) Italy; Caterina Gaddi; July Marano; Giulia Perotti; Matilde Ferrari	
2025	(Philippines) Manila	France; Lola Chassat; Elena Colas; Maïana Prat; Perla Denéchère	(Japan) Japan; Yume Minamino; Misa Nishiyama; Risora Ogawa; Rinon Muneta	(United States) United States; Charleigh Bullock; Lavi Crain; Caroline Moreau; Addy Fulcher	

== All-time medal count ==
Last updated after the 2025 Junior World Championships.

Rank	Nation	Gold	Silver	Bronze	Total
1	Japan	1	1	0	2
2	France	1	0	0	1
2	Russia	1	0	0	1
4	United States	0	1	2	3
5	China	0	1	0	1
6	Italy	0	0	1	1
Totals (6 entries)		3	3	3	9
