= Perla Denéchère =

French artistic gymnast

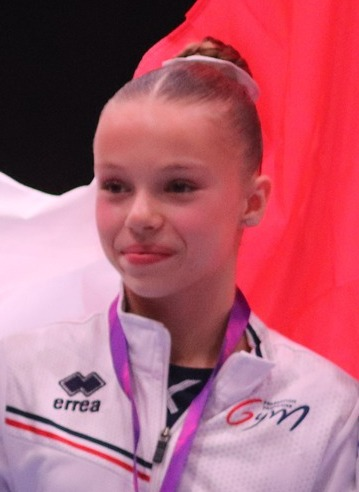
- Denéchère at the 2025 Junior World Championships

Personal information
- Born: 7 January 2010 (age 16) Tours, France

Gymnastics career
- Discipline: Women's artistic gymnastics
- Country represented: France (2024–2026)
- Club: Avoine-Beaumont
- Head coaches: Marc and Gina Chirilcenco
Medal record
Representing France
Junior World Championships
Gold medal – first place	2025 Manila	Team
Junior European Championships
Gold medal – first place	2024 Rimini	Team
Bronze medal – third place	2024 Rimini	Floor exercise

Perla Denéchère (born January 7, 2010) is a French artistic gymnast. She was the alternate for the gold medal winning team at the 2025 Junior World Championships. She was part of the gold medal winning team at the 2024 Junior European Championships where she also won bronze on floor exercise.

== Early life ==
Denéchère was born in Tours, France in 2010.

== Gymnastics career ==
=== 2024–2025: Junior ===
In early 2024, Denéchère competed at the Magglingen Junior Friendly where she won silver in the all-around gold medal behind teammate Elena Colas and helped the French team win the gold medal by nearly 10 points. At the 2024 Junior European Championships, Denéchère helped France win team gold. Individually she won bronze on floor exercise behind Italians Giulia Perotti and Emma Fioravanti and she placed seventh on balance beam. At the 2024 French National Championships, she won bronze in the all-around behind Colas and Maïana Prat.

Denéchère began 2025 competing at International Gymnix where she helped the French team win gold. Individually she placed fifth in the all-around. She was selected as the alternate for the 2025 Junior World Championships team where she was awarded the gold medal after Colas, Prat, and Lola Chassat won the team title.

=== 2026–present: Senior ===
Denéchère became age-eligible for senior level competition in 2026. At her first senior level national championships, she placed fourth in the all-around behind her fellow Junior World Championships team members Colas, Prat, and Chassat. In late June, Denéchère's coaches, Marc and Gina Chirilcenco, announced that they would be leaving France in order to create a high performance gymnastics team in Qatar. Denéchère's mother confirmed that her daughter would follow her coaches to Qatar and begin representing Qatar in international competition.

== Competitive history ==
Competitive history of Perla Denéchère at the junior level
Year	Event	Team	AA	VT	UB	BB	FX
2021	Tournoi International	1st place, gold medalist(s)	16				
2022	French Test Meet		8				
2022	French National Championships		3rd place, bronze medalist(s)	2nd place, silver medalist(s)	3rd place, bronze medalist(s)	2nd place, silver medalist(s)	4
2022	Tournoi International	2nd place, silver medalist(s)	10				
2023	French National Championships		4	2nd place, silver medalist(s)	3rd place, bronze medalist(s)		
2023	French National Team Review		7				
2024	Magglingen Junior Friendly	1st place, gold medalist(s)	2nd place, silver medalist(s)				
2024	Junior European Championships	1st place, gold medalist(s)				7	3rd place, bronze medalist(s)
2024	French National Championships		3rd place, bronze medalist(s)		3rd place, bronze medalist(s)	3rd place, bronze medalist(s)	2nd place, silver medalist(s)
2024	French National Team Review		4				
2024	Tournoi International	3rd place, bronze medalist(s)	2nd place, silver medalist(s)			5	4
2025	International Gymnix	1st place, gold medalist(s)	5				
2025	French National Team Review		2nd place, silver medalist(s)				
2025	Tournoi International	2nd place, silver medalist(s)	4				1st place, gold medalist(s)
2025	Junior World Championships	(gold) (Note: Denéchère was the Team FRA alternate)					

Competitive history of Perla Denéchère at the senior level
Year	Event	Team	AA	VT	UB	BB	FX
2026	French National Test		7				
2026	French National Championships		4		4		6
