= Elisa Iorio =

Italian artistic gymnast

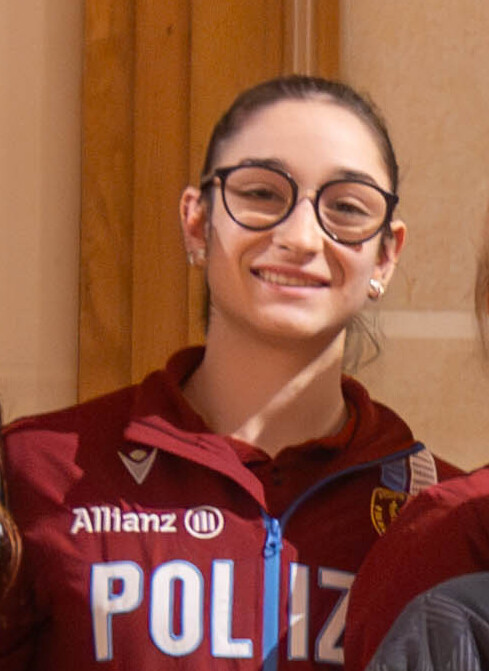
- Iorio in 2023

Personal information
- Born: March 21, 2003 (age 23) Modena, Italy

Gymnastics career
- Discipline: Women's artistic gymnastics
- Country represented: Italy; (2016–present)
- Club: Fiamme Oro
- Gym: Brixia
- Head coach: Enrico Casella
- Assistant coaches: Marco Campodonico, Monica Bergamelli
Medal record
Representing Italy
Olympic Games
Silver medal – second place	2024 Paris	Team
World Championships
Bronze medal – third place	2019 Stuttgart	Team
European Championships
Gold medal – first place	2024 Rimini	Team
Silver medal – second place	2024 Rimini	Uneven bars
Silver medal – second place	2026 Zagreb	Team
Silver medal – second place	2026 Zagreb	Uneven bars
FIG World Cup
Event / 1st / 2nd / 3rd; Apparatus World Cup / 1 / 1 / 0

Elisa Iorio (born 21 March 2003) is an Italian artistic gymnast. She was a member of the historic teams that won silver at the 2024 Olympic Games and bronze at the 2019 World Championships. Additionally she was part of the gold medal winning team at the 2024 European Championships, where she also won silver on the uneven bars. In 2026 she won two more European silver medals, one with the team and the other on the uneven bars.

== Early life ==
Iorio was born in Modena, Italy, in 2003. In 2017 she moved to Brescia to train at the International Academy of Brixia.

== Junior gymnastics career ==
=== 2016–2017 ===
Iorio made her international debut at the 2016 City of Jesolo Trophy, where she placed 15th in the all-around.

In 2017 Iorio competed at International Gymnix, where she placed 6th in the all-around and won bronze on the uneven bars. She later competed at the 2017 City of Jesolo Trophy, where she won gold on the uneven bars and placed 6th in the all-around. Iorio competed at the 2017 Mediterranean Junior Championships, where she won gold in the all-around, on vault, and in the team finals. She also won silver on the balance beam. In July she competed at the 2017 European Youth Olympic Festival, where she placed fourth in the all-around, first on uneven bars, and second in the team final. Iorio later competed at the Italian National Championships, where she became the national champion

=== 2018 ===
Iorio competed at the City of Jesolo Trophy in April. Italy placed first in the team competition. Iorio competed at the 2018 European Women's Artistic Gymnastics Championships alongside Asia D'Amato, Alice D'Amato, Alessia Federici, and Giorgia Villa, where Italy won team gold. Individually Iorio won balance beam bronze.

== Senior gymnastics career ==
=== 2019 ===
In April Iorio was officially named to the team to compete at the 2019 European Championships alongside Villa and the D'Amato twins. During qualifications she placed fourteenth in the all-around but did not advance to the finals due to teammates Alice D'Amato and Giorgia Villa scoring higher.

In August Iorio competed at the Heerenveen Friendly, where she helped Italy win gold in the team competition ahead of the Netherlands and Norway, and individually she finished eighth in the all-around. On September 4 Iorio was named to the team to compete at the 2019 World Championships in Stuttgart, Germany alongside Alice D'Amato, Asia D'Amato, Giorgia Villa, and Desirée Carofiglio.

During qualifications at the 2019 World Championships Iorio helped Italy qualify to the team final in eighth place; as a result Italy also qualified to the 2020 Olympic Games in Tokyo. Individually she qualified to the all-around final in 18th place. In the team final, Iorio helped Italy win the bronze medal—Italy's first team medal since the 1950 World Artistic Gymnastics Championships. They ended up finishing behind the United States and Russia but ahead of China, who originally qualified to the final in second place. During the all-around final Iorio competed on three events before she hurt her ankle on vault and withdrew from the competition.

=== 2020–2021 ===
Iorio competed at the first Italian Serie A competition, where she recorded the second highest score on the uneven bars. In September she suffered an injury to her ankle ligaments and would be out of training for four months while she recovered from surgery.

Iorio returned to competition at the 2021 Italian national championships, where she only competed on balance beam and uneven bars, the latter of which she won gold. Although she was not sufficiently recovered enough to be selected to represent Italy at the Olympic Games, she was selected to compete at the 2021 World Championships. While there she qualified to the uneven bars final and was the second reserve for the balance beam final. She ended up placing sixth on uneven bars. Iorio was the third ever Italian gymnast to compete in an uneven bars final at a World Championships after Vanessa Ferrari (2006, 2007) and Serena Licchetta (2009).

=== 2022 ===
Iorio competed at the DTB Pokal Mixed Cup in March; she contributed scores on uneven bars and balance beam towards Italy's third place finish. In October Iorio was named to the team to compete at the World Championships in Liverpool alongside Alice D'Amato, Giorgia Villa, Martina Maggio, Manila Esposito, and Veronica Mandriota.

=== 2024 ===
Iorio competed at the 2024 European Championships alongside Alice D'Amato, Asia D'Amato, Manila Esposito, and Angela Andreoli. During event finals Iorio won silver on the uneven bars, earning her first senior-level European medal. On the final day of competition, the team final, Iorio recorded scores on uneven bars and floor exercise, helping Italy win their third European team title.

In July Iorio competed at the Italian Championships, where she placed third in the all-around. At the conclusion of the competition she was named to the team to represent Italy at the 2024 Summer Olympics alongside Alice D'Amato, Andreoli, Esposito, and Giorgia Villa.

At the 2024 Olympic Games Iorio helped Italy qualify to the team final in second place. Individually she placed thirteenth in the all-around, which would have qualified her to the final had two of her teammates not finished higher. Prior to the team final Iorio sprained her ankle in training; although she was unable to vault during the final, she still contributed a score on the uneven bars towards Italy's second place finish, tying Italy's highest Olympic team placement. The last time the Italian women won an Olympic team medal was 96 years prior at the 1928 Olympic Games.

=== 2026 ===
At the European Championships in Zagreb, Iorio qualified for the uneven bars final, where she went on to win silver behind Helen Kevric. She competed in the team final together with Manila Esposito, Giulia Perotti, July Marano and Anthea Sisio, winning silver behind the Russian team.

== Personal life ==
Iorio is in a relationship with men's team member Yumin Abbadini.

== Competitive history ==
Competitive history of Elisa Iorio at the junior level
Year	Event	Team	AA	VT	UB	BB	FX
2016	City of Jesolo Trophy		15				
2016	Italian Junior Friendly	2nd place, silver medalist(s)	18				
2016	Italian Championships				7		
2016	Tournoi International		5				
2017	1st Italian Serie A	2nd place, silver medalist(s)	3rd place, bronze medalist(s)				
2017	International Gymnix	2nd place, silver medalist(s)	6		3rd place, bronze medalist(s)		8
2017	City of Jesolo Trophy	2nd place, silver medalist(s)	8	5	1st place, gold medalist(s)	7	7
2017	Mediterranean Championships	1st place, gold medalist(s)	1st place, gold medalist(s)	1st place, gold medalist(s)	2nd place, silver medalist(s)		
2017	Italian Gold Championships				1st place, gold medalist(s)		
2017	FIT Challenge	1st place, gold medalist(s)	3rd place, bronze medalist(s)				
2017	German Junior Friendly	1st place, gold medalist(s)	3rd place, bronze medalist(s)				
2017	Euro Youth Olympic Festival	2nd place, silver medalist(s)	4	7	1st place, gold medalist(s)		
2017	Italian Championships		1st place, gold medalist(s)		2nd place, silver medalist(s)	6	6
2017	4th Italian Serie A	5	1st place, gold medalist(s)				
2018	1st Italian Serie A	1st place, gold medalist(s)	12				
2018	International Gymnix		16			2nd place, silver medalist(s)	
2018	City of Jesolo Trophy	1st place, gold medalist(s)	4		1st place, gold medalist(s)	3rd place, bronze medalist(s)	4
2018	2nd Italian Serie A	1st place, gold medalist(s)	3rd place, bronze medalist(s)				
2018	3rd Italian Serie A	1st place, gold medalist(s)	3rd place, bronze medalist(s)				
2018	Youth Olympic Games Qualifier		5				
2018	Italian Championships		2nd place, silver medalist(s)		4	7	5
2018	Pieve di Soligo Friendly	1st place, gold medalist(s)	1st place, gold medalist(s)				
2018	European Championships	1st place, gold medalist(s)	6		4	3rd place, bronze medalist(s)	

Competitive history of Elisa Iorio at the senior level
Year	Event	Team	AA	VT	UB	BB	FX
2019	1st Italian Serie A	1st place, gold medalist(s)	3rd place, bronze medalist(s)		1st place, gold medalist(s)		
2019	City of Jesolo Trophy	3rd place, bronze medalist(s)	11		3rd place, bronze medalist(s)	6	
2019	2nd Italian Serie A	1st place, gold medalist(s)		2nd place, silver medalist(s)	2nd place, silver medalist(s)	1st place, gold medalist(s)	
2019	3rd Italian Serie A	1st place, gold medalist(s)			3rd place, bronze medalist(s)		
2019	Heerenveen Friendly	1st place, gold medalist(s)	8				
2019	World Championships	3rd place, bronze medalist(s)	DNF				
2020	1st Italian Serie A	1st place, gold medalist(s)			2nd place, silver medalist(s)		
2021	National Championships				1st place, gold medalist(s)		
2021	World Championships				6	R2	
2022	DTB Pokal Mixed Cup	3rd place, bronze medalist(s)					
2022	World Championships	5 (Note: Iorio was the team ITA alternate)					
2023	National Championships		3rd place, bronze medalist(s)		2nd place, silver medalist(s)	3rd place, bronze medalist(s)	
2023	World Championships	5					
2024	Baku World Cup				2nd place, silver medalist(s)	8	
2024	City of Jesolo Trophy	1st place, gold medalist(s)	17				
2024	European Championships	1st place, gold medalist(s)			2nd place, silver medalist(s)		
2024	Italian Championships		3rd place, bronze medalist(s)		2nd place, silver medalist(s)		
2024	Olympic Games	2nd place, silver medalist(s)					
2026	Cottbus World Cup				1st place, gold medalist(s)		
2026	European Championships	2nd place, silver medalist(s)			2nd place, silver medalist(s)		
2026	World Championships	7			8		
2026	Arthur Gander Memorial		5				
