= Artistic gymnastics at the 2025 European Youth Summer Olympic Festival =

- Venue: Gradski vrt Hall
- Location: Osijek, Croatia
- Date: 20–26 July 2025

Artistic gymnastics at the 2025 European Youth Summer Olympic Festival will be held at the Gradski vrt Hall in Osijek, Croatia from 20 to 26 July 2025. Although Skopje, North Macedonia is the host of the 2025 European Youth Summer Olympic Festival, the artistic gymnastics competition will be held in Osijek since the city "offers fantastic conditions for gymnastics, has a strong tradition, and experienced people who know how to organise events like this" according to Zlatko Mateša, member of the Executive Committee of the European Olympic Committees.

== Medal standings ==
=== Overall ===
Rank	Nation	Gold	Silver	Bronze	Total
1	France	6	2	1	9
2	Great Britain	5	1	1	7
3	Italy	2	6	1	9
4	Switzerland	1	1	0	2
5	Germany	1	0	2	3
6	Ireland	1	0	1	2
7	Slovakia	0	2	1	3
8	Austria	0	1	1	2
8	Romania	0	1	1	2
8	Ukraine	0	1	1	2
11	Hungary	0	0	1	1
11	Israel	0	0	1	1
11	Poland	0	0	1	1
11	Turkey	0	0	1	1
Totals (14 entries)		16	15	14	45

=== Boys ===
Rank	Nation	Gold	Silver	Bronze	Total
1	Great Britain	5	0	1	6
2	Italy	1	5	0	6
3	Switzerland	1	1	0	2
4	Germany	1	0	1	2
4	Ireland	1	0	1	2
6	Austria	0	1	1	2
6	Ukraine	0	1	1	2
8	Hungary	0	0	1	1
8	Poland	0	0	1	1
Totals (9 entries)		9	8	7	24

=== Girls ===
Rank	Nation	Gold	Silver	Bronze	Total
1	France	5	2	1	8
2	Italy	1	0	1	2
3	Slovakia	0	2	1	3
4	Romania	0	1	1	2
5	Great Britain	0	1	0	1
6	Germany	0	0	1	1
6	Turkey	0	0	1	1
Totals (7 entries)		6	6	6	18

=== Mixed ===
Rank	Nation	Gold	Silver	Bronze	Total
1	France	1	0	0	1
2	Italy	0	1	0	1
3	Israel	0	0	1	1
Totals (3 entries)		1	1	1	3

== Medals summary ==
=== Medalists ===
Event	Gold	Silver	Bronze
Boys
Team all-around	United Kingdom; Evan McPhillips; Radell Fawzi Zakaine; Uzair Chowdhury	Italy; Pietro Mazzola; Ivan Rigon; Riccardo Ruggeri	Germany; Zeno Csuka; Philipp Steeb; Nikita Prohorov
Individual all-around	(United Kingdom) Evan McPhillips	(Italy) Ivan Rigon	(United Kingdom) Uzair Chowdhury
Floor exercise	(United Kingdom) Evan McPhillips	(Italy) Riccardo Ruggeri	(Republic of Ireland) Chester Enríquez
Pommel horse	(Germany) Nikita Prohorov (Switzerland) Ben Schumacher	Not awarded	(Poland) Tomasz Lek Khac
Rings	(United Kingdom) Uzair Chowdhury	(Ukraine) Tymofii Kyrychenko	(Hungary) Bence Hamza Vargity
Vault	(Republic of Ireland) Chester Enríquez	(Austria) Samuel Elias Wachter	(Ukraine) Valentyn Havrylchenko
Parallel bars	(United Kingdom) Uzair Chowdhury	(Switzerland) Ben Schumacher (Italy) Ivan Rigon	Not awarded
Horizontal bar	(Italy) Pietro Mazzola	(Italy) Ivan Rigon	(Austria) Jeremy Balazs
Girls
Team all-around	France; Lola Chassat; Elena Colas; Maïana Prat	Slovakia; Lilly Murínová; Nela Ostrihoňová; Lucia Piliarová	Italy; Sofia Bianchi; Mia Proietti; Giulia Santinato
Individual all-around	(France) Elena Colas	(Slovakia) Lucia Piliarová	(Romania) Alexia Blanaru
Vault	(Italy) Mia Proietti	(Romania) Alexia Blanaru	(Germany) Madita Mayr
Uneven bars	(France) Elena Colas	(United Kingdom) Helena Finc	(France) Lola Chassat
Balance beam	(France) Elena Colas	(France) Lola Chassat	(Slovakia) Nela Ostrihoňová
Floor exercise	(France) Maïana Prat	(France) Elena Colas	(Turkey) Yaşam Suğra Akan
Mixed
Mixed team	France; Elena Colas; Ruddly Maisonnable	Italy; Mia Proietti; Ivan Rigon	Israel; Ophir Shmuely; Noam Berkovich
