= 2024 DTB Pokal Stuttgart =

Artistic gymnastics competition

EnBW DTB Pokal 2024
- Venue: Porsche-Arena
- Location: Stuttgart, Germany
- Dates: March 15–17, 2024

The 2024 EnBW DTB Pokal Team Challenge and Mixed Cup was an artistic gymnastics competition held from March 15–17, 2024 at the Porsche-Arena in Stuttgart, Germany. The event consisted of five separate competitions across three days: a team challenge competition for both senior men and women; a team challenge for junior men and women; and a mixed team cup which was contested between mixed gender senior teams from Belgium, China, Germany, and the United States.

== Schedule ==
Date	Session	Time
Friday, March 15	Junior Team Challenge Men	10:00–13:15
Friday, March 15	Team Challenge Men	16:00–19:45
Saturday, March 16	Junior Team Challenge Women	10:00–12:30
Saturday, March 16	Team Challenge Women	14:30–17:30
Saturday, March 16	Men's Apparatus Finals – Seniors & Juniors	18:30–21:45
Sunday, March 17	Women's Apparatus Finals – Seniors & Juniors	10:00–12:15
Sunday, March 17	Mixed Cup	14:30–17:15

== Medalists ==
=== Senior ===
Event	Gold	Silver	Bronze
Team Challenge
Men
Team	United States; Cameron Bock; Riley Loos; Yul Moldauer; Curran Phillips; Shane Wiskus	Italy; Yumin Abbadini; Lorenzo Minh Casali; Edoardo de Rosa; Matteo Levantesi; Mario Macchiati	China; Lan Xingyu; Shi Cong; Sun Wei; Yang Jixaing; Su Weide
Floor Exercise	(Switzerland) Matteo Giubellini	(Germany) Pascal Brendel	(Italy) Yumin Abbadini
Pommel Horse	(Switzerland) Matteo Giubellini	(Italy) Edoardo de Rosa	(Germany) Nils Dunkel
Rings	(China) Lan Xingyu	(Belgium) Glen Cuyle	(Canada) Félix Dolci
Vault	(Switzerland) Florian Langenegger	(Spain) Unai Baigorri Alonso	(France) Nicolas Diez
Parallel Bars	(United States) Curran Phillips	(Canada) Félix Dolci	(Switzerland) Matteo Giubellini
Horizontal Bar	(Belgium) Noah Kuavita	(Italy) Yumin Abbadini	(China) Shi Cong
Women
Team	China; Qiu Qiyuan; Wu Ran; Zhang Jin; Zhang Xinyi; Zhou Yaqin	Australia; Georgia Godwin; Kate McDonald; Ruby Pass; Breanna Scott; Emily Whitehead	France; Maeva Guery; Lucie Henna; Djenna Laroui; Lana Pondart; Lilou Viallat
Vault	(Canada) Gabrielle Black	(Germany) Marlene Gotthardt	(Romania) Miruna Valentina Botez
Uneven Bars	(China) Qiu Qiyuan	(Australia) Kate McDonald	(Spain) Frida Rodríguez-Cabo
Balance Beam	(China) Qiu Qiyuan	(Australia) Georgia Godwin	(Germany) Marlene Gotthardt
Floor Exercise	(Australia) Georgia Godwin	(Spain) Alba Petisco	(Romania) Miruna Valentina Botez
Mixed Cup
Team	United States; Kai Uemura; Fuzzy Benas; Nola Matthews; Addison Fatta; Dulcy Caylor; Riley Loos	China; Wu Ran; Zhang Jin; Zhang Xinyi; Lan Xingyu; Shi Cong; Sun Wei	Germany; Milan Hosseini; Meolie Jauch; Pascal Brendel; Timo Eder; Karina Schönmaier; Marlene Gotthardt

=== Junior ===
Event	Gold	Silver	Bronze
Men
Team	United States; Sasha Bogonosiuk; Kiran Mandava; Nathan Roman; Adam Lakomy; Hasan Aydogdu	Italy; Tommaso Brugnami; Gabriele Louis Lupo; Pietro Mazzola; Ivan Rigon; Simone Speranza	France; Elias Brèche; Nathan Camilleri; Anthony Mansard; Alan Moullec; Leeroy Traoré-Malatre
Floor Exercise	(Italy) Tommaso Brugnami	(Turkey) Alperen Ege Avci	(United States) Oleksandr Bogonosiuk
Pommel Horse	(Australia) Ritam Malik	(Austria) Alfred Schwaiger	(United States) Kiran Mandava
Rings	(United States) Adam Lakomy	(France) Anthony Mansard	(Austria) Vincent Landpointner
Vault	(Italy) Tommaso Brugnami	(Spain) Sergio Kovacs Molcut	(United States) Adam Lakomy
Parallel Bars	(France) Anthony Mansard	(Germany) Jonas Eder	(United States) Kiran Mandava
Horizontal Bar	(France) Anthony Mansard	(Japan) Taiki Kakutani	(United States) Adam Lakomy
Women
Team	France; Noélie Ayuso; Lola Chassat; Astria Nelo; Romane Hamelin; Maïana Prat	Japan; Asumi Morishita; Misa Nishiyama; Remi Watanabe	Germany; Lara Baumgartl; Aliya-Jolie Funk; Madita Mayr; Michaela Mühlhofer; Charleen Pach
Vault	(Romania) Alexia Blanaru	(Japan) Asumi Morishita	(Canada) Lia Redick
Uneven Bars	(France) Lola Chassat	(Romania) Marcela Cercea	(Belgium) Sien Ghekiere
Balance Beam	(Japan) Asumi Morishita	(Canada) Samantha Couture	(France) Maïana Prat
Floor Exercise	(France) Maïana Prat	(Canada) Stella Letendre	(Germany) Charleen Pach

== Participants ==
Participating nations and event distribution per nation
Country	Women Senior Team Challenge	Men Senior Team Challenge	Women Junior Team Challenge	Men Junior Team Challenge	Mixed Cup
Australia	Yes	Yes	No	Yes	No
Austria	Yes	No	Yes	Yes	No
Belgium	Yes	Yes	Yes	Yes	Yes
Canada	Yes	Yes	Yes	No	No
China	Yes	Yes	No	No	Yes
France	Yes	Yes	Yes	Yes	No
Germany	Yes	Yes	Yes	Yes	Yes
Israel	Yes	Yes	No	Yes	No
Italy	No	Yes	No	Yes	No
Japan	No	Yes	Yes	Yes	No
Netherlands	No	No	No	Yes	No
Romania	Yes	No	Yes	Yes	No
Spain	Yes	Yes	No	Yes	No
Switzerland	No	Yes	No	Yes	No
Sweden	No	No	No	No	No
Turkey	No	No	Yes	Yes	No
United States	No	Yes	No	Yes	Yes
Uzbekistan	No	Yes	No	No	No
Total	10	13	8	14	4
