= Asia D'Amato =

Italian artistic gymnast

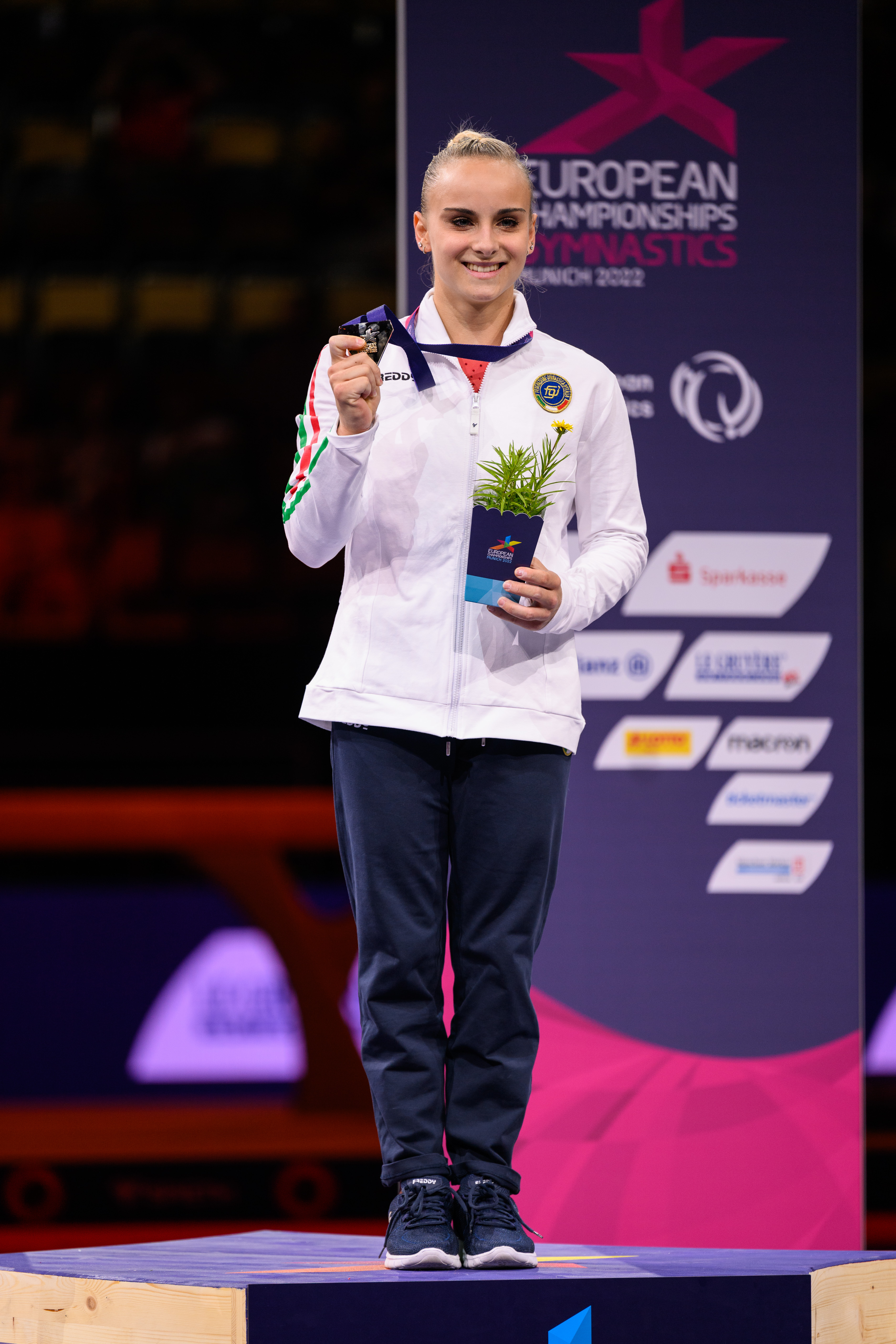
- D'Amato at the 2022 European Championships

Personal information
- Full name: Asia D'Amato
- Born: 7 February 2003 (age 23) Genoa, Italy
- Height: 1.5 m (4 ft 11 in)
- Relatives: Alice D'Amato

Gymnastics career
- Discipline: Women's artistic gymnastics
- Country represented: Italy (2015–present)
- Club: Fiamme Oro
- Gym: Brixia
- Head coaches: Enrico Casella, Monica Bergamelli, Marco Campodonico
Medal record
Representing Italy
World Championships
Silver medal – second place	2021 Kitakyushu	Vault
Bronze medal – third place	2019 Stuttgart	Team
European Championships
Gold medal – first place	2022 Munich	Team
Gold medal – first place	2022 Munich	All-around
Gold medal – first place	2024 Rimini	Team
Silver medal – second place	2022 Munich	Vault
Silver medal – second place	2023 Antalya	Team
Silver medal – second place	2023 Antalya	Vault
Mediterranean Games
Gold medal – first place	2022 Oran	Team
Gold medal – first place	2022 Oran	Vault
Gold medal – first place	2022 Oran	Floor exercise
Silver medal – second place	2022 Oran	All-around
Silver medal – second place	2022 Oran	Balance beam

Asia D'Amato (Italian pronunciation: [ˈaːzja daˈmaːto]; born 7 February 2003) is an Italian artistic gymnast. She represented Italy at the 2020 Olympic Games. She was a member of the teams that won bronze at the 2019 World Championships and gold at the 2022 European Championships. Individually, she is the 2021 World vault silver medalist, the 2022 European all-around champion and vault silver medalist, the 2019 and 2020 Italian national champion, and the 2018 Junior European vault champion. She is a member of the Italian National Team and is the twin sister of Alice D'Amato.

== Early life ==
D'Amato and her twin sister, Alice, were born in Genoa, Italy, on 7 February 2003. She and her sister began gymnastics at the age of 7 at the Andrea Doria Sports Club in Genoa, Italy. They currently train at the International Academy of Brixia in Brescia. In December 2020, Alice and Asia received the Athlete of the Year award in the Liguria region of Italy.

In September 2022, their father, Massimo, died after a long battle with cancer.

== Junior gymnastics career ==
=== 2015–2017 ===
D'Amato made her international debut at the 2015 City of Jesolo Trophy as part of Italy's Young Dreams team alongside Giorgia Villa.

In 2017, D'Amato competed at the Italian National Championships, where she placed first on vault, second on floor exercise, and third on uneven bars. She later competed at the 2017 European Youth Olympic Festival alongside Elisa Iorio and Alice D'Amato. There, she helped Italy win silver behind Russia. Individually, she placed second in the all-around behind Ksenia Klimenko of Russia, third on vault behind Valeria Saifulina of Russia and Denisa Golgotă of Romania, third on uneven bars behind Iorio and Klimenko, and second on balance beam behind Klimenko.

=== 2018 ===
D'Amato competed at the 2018 City of Jesolo Trophy in April where Italy placed first in the team competition. She continued her national and international dominance on vault, winning gold at International Gymnix, all Italian Serie A competitions, and at the Youth Olympic Games Qualifier. In August, D'Amato competed at the 2018 European Championships alongside Alice D'Amato, Alessia Federici, Elisa Iorio, and Giorgia Villa, where Italy won team gold and, individually, D'Amato won gold on vault.

== Senior gymnastics career ==
=== 2019 ===
In April D'Amato was officially named to the team to compete at the 2019 European Championships alongside Giorgia Villa, Elisa Iorio and Alice D'Amato. During qualifications, she placed eleventh in the all-around but did not qualify to the final due to Alice D'Amato and Giorgia Villa scoring higher. She qualified for the vault final in fourth place. During finals she once again finished in fourth, behind Maria Paseka of Russia, Coline Devillard of France, and Ellie Downie of Great Britain.

In August, D'Amato competed at the Heerenveen Friendly, where she helped Italy win gold in the team competition ahead of the Netherlands and Norway, and individually she finished fifth in the all-around behind Giorgia Villa, Eythora Thorsdottir, Naomi Visser, and Alice D'Amato. Additionally, she recorded the third-highest vault and balance beam scores. On 4 September, D'Amato was named to the team to compete at the 2019 World Championships in Stuttgart, Germany alongside her sister, Villa, Elisa Iorio, and Desirée Carofiglio.

During qualifications at the World Championships, D'Amato helped Italy qualify to the team final in eighth place; as a result, Italy also qualified to the 2020 Olympic Games in Tokyo. She scored high enough to become the second reserve for the all-around final but did not due to teammates Villa and Iorio scoring higher than her. In the team final, D'Amato helped Italy win the bronze medal – Italy's first team medal since the 1950 World Artistic Gymnastics Championships. They ended up finishing behind the United States and Russia but ahead of China, which originally qualified to the final in second place.

=== 2020 ===
In late January, it was announced that D'Amato would compete at the Stuttgart World Cup taking place in March. The Stuttgart World Cup was later canceled due to the COVID-19 pandemic in Germany. In November D'Amato competed at the Italian National Championships where she tied for first with Giorgia Villa. During event finals, she won gold on vault, bronze on the uneven bars (behind Villa and Martina Maggio) and on balance beam (behind Maggio and Villa), and silver on floor exercise once again behind Villa.

=== 2021 ===
D'Amato was named to the team to represent Italy at the 2020 Summer Olympics alongside Alice D'Amato, Giorgia Villa (later replaced by Vanessa Ferrari), and Martina Maggio. The team qualified for the team finals and placed fourth with a total score of 163.638. In October D'Amato was selected to compete at the 2021 World Championships. While there, she qualified to the all-around and vault finals, becoming the first Italian female gymnast to qualify to the latter. During the vault final, she performed a Yurchenko double and a half on full twist. She won the silver medal behind reigning Olympic vault champion Rebeca Andrade. This was Italy's first World medal on vault in women's artistic gymnastics.

=== 2022 ===
D'Amato competed at the DTB Pokal Team Challenge. Her scores on vault, uneven bars, and balance beam contributed towards Italy's second-place finish. Individually, D'Amato won silver on vault. D'Amato next competed at the City of Jesolo Trophy. She helped Italy finish second as a team and individually placed second in the all-around behind Konnor McClain. During event finals, she finished second on vault behind Coline Devillard, fifth on balance beam, and sixth on uneven bars.

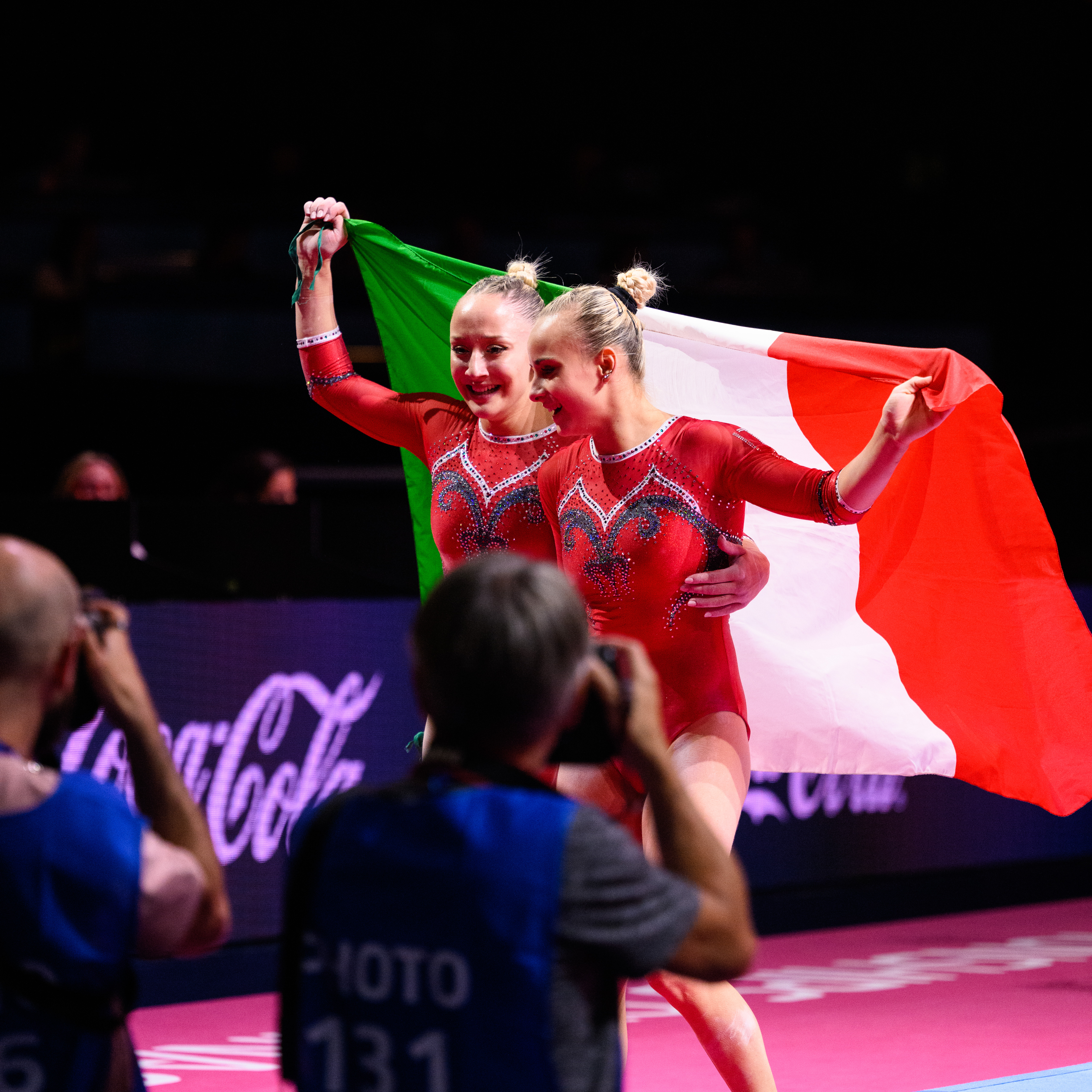
D'Amato (right) and Martina Maggio at the 2022 European Championships

In June D'Amato competed at the Mediterranean Games alongside Angela Andreoli, Alice D'Amato, Martina Maggio, and Giorgia Villa. Together they won gold in the team competition, over five points ahead of second-place France. Individually, D'Amato won silver in the all-around and on balance beam behind compatriot Maggio and won gold on vault and floor exercise.

D'Amato next competed at the European Championships. On the first day of competition, she won gold in the all-around ahead of Alice Kinsella of Great Britain and compatriot Maggio. She is the second Italian woman to win the all-around title after Vanessa Ferrari did so in 2007. Additionally D'Amato helped Italy qualify to the team final in first place and individually she qualified to the vault and balance beam finals. During the team final, D'Amato contributed scores on all four apparatuses towards Italy's first-place finish. During event finals D'Amato won silver on vault behind Zsófia Kovács. D'Amato injured her ankle when landing her second vault and therefore withdrew from the balance beam final. An MRI later revealed that D'Amato would need to undergo surgery to repair ankle ligaments and she would be unable to compete at the upcoming World Championships.

=== 2023 ===
D'Amato returned to competition at the European Championships where she helped Italy finish second as a team. Additionally, she finished second on vault behind Coline Devillard. D'Amato next competed at the Cairo World Cup. She qualified for the vault and balance beam finals. During the vault final, D'Amato won silver behind Joscelyn Roberson but injured her knee when landing her second vault. As a result, she withdrew from the balance beam final. An MRI later revealed that D'Amato tore her ACL and meniscus and would require surgery to repair them.

=== 2024 ===
D'Amato returned to competition at the City of Jesolo Trophy where she helped Italy finish first as a team, and individually she won bronze in the all-around and on balance beam. She next competed at the European Championships alongside Alice D'Amato, Angela Andreoli, Elisa Iorio, and Manila Esposito. During the qualification round, while competing on floor exercise, D'Amato once again injured her ACL. Although she was unable to compete in the team final, Italy still won gold ahead of Great Britain.

=== 2025 ===
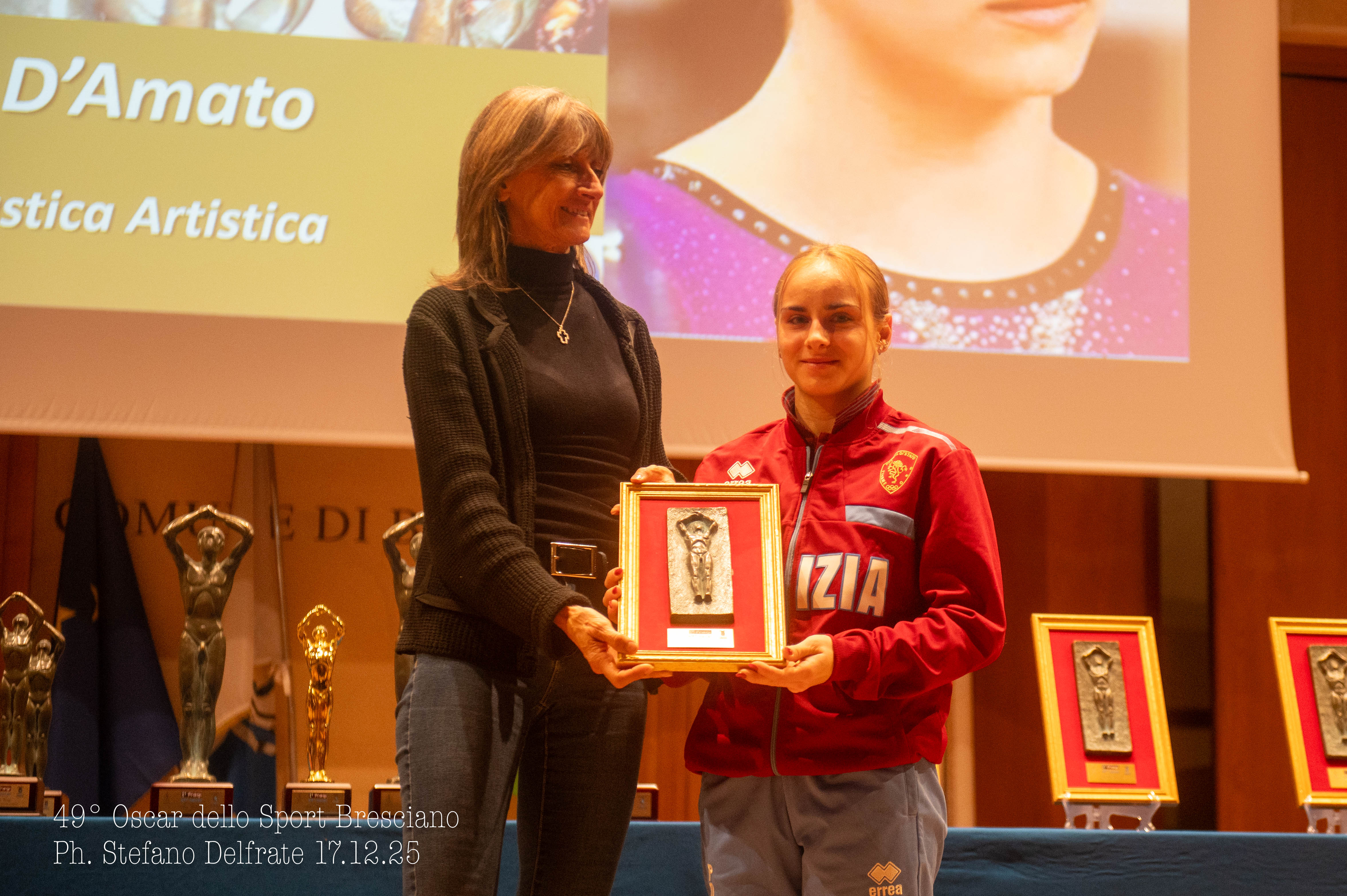
D'Amato at the 2025 Oscar dello Sport Bresciano award ceremony

D'Amato returned to competition at the 2025 City of Jesolo Trophy where she only competed on the uneven bars. At the Italian National Championships she placed fourth in the all-around behind Giulia Perotti, Alice D'Amato, and Emma Fioravanti. She competed at the 2025 World Championships where she placed fifth in the all-around, marking her best all-around finish at a World Championships.

== Competitive history ==
Competitive history of Asia D'Amato at the junior level
Year	Event	Team	AA	VT	UB	BB	FX
2015	City of Jesolo Trophy		22				
2015	Golden League	2nd place, silver medalist(s)					
2016	City of Jesolo Trophy		10		8		
2016	Italian Junior Friendly	2nd place, silver medalist(s)	9				
2016	Italian Championships			1st place, gold medalist(s)			
2016	Tournoi International		2nd place, silver medalist(s)				
2017	1st Italian Serie A	1st place, gold medalist(s)	6				
2017	International Gymnix	2nd place, silver medalist(s)	5	3rd place, bronze medalist(s)			
2017	City of Jesolo Trophy	2nd place, silver medalist(s)	7	4	6		
2017	2nd Italian Serie A	1st place, gold medalist(s)	2nd place, silver medalist(s)				
2017	3rd Italian Serie A	1st place, gold medalist(s)	2nd place, silver medalist(s)				
2017	Italian Gold Championships		1st place, gold medalist(s)	1st place, gold medalist(s)	2nd place, silver medalist(s)	2nd place, silver medalist(s)	2nd place, silver medalist(s)
2017	FIT Challenge	1st place, gold medalist(s)	2nd place, silver medalist(s)				
2017	German Junior Friendly	1st place, gold medalist(s)	1st place, gold medalist(s)				
2017	Euro Youth Olympic Festival	2nd place, silver medalist(s)	2nd place, silver medalist(s)	3rd place, bronze medalist(s)	3rd place, bronze medalist(s)	2nd place, silver medalist(s)	
2017	Italian Championships		2nd place, silver medalist(s)	1st place, gold medalist(s)	3rd place, bronze medalist(s)		2nd place, silver medalist(s)
2017	4th Italian Serie A		1st place, gold medalist(s)				
2018	1st Italian Serie A	1st place, gold medalist(s)	2nd place, silver medalist(s)				
2018	International Gymnix		2nd place, silver medalist(s)	1st place, gold medalist(s)	8		6
2018	City of Jesolo Trophy	1st place, gold medalist(s)	5				
2018	2nd Italian Serie A	1st place, gold medalist(s)	1st place, gold medalist(s)				
2018	3rd Italian Serie A	1st place, gold medalist(s)					
2018	Youth Olympic Games Qualifier		4				
2018	European Championships	1st place, gold medalist(s)	4	1st place, gold medalist(s)			

Competitive history of Asia D'Amato at the senior level
Year	Event	Team	AA	VT	UB	BB	FX
2019	1st Italian Serie A	1st place, gold medalist(s)					
2019	City of Jesolo Trophy	3rd place, bronze medalist(s)	7	1st place, gold medalist(s)			6
2019	2nd Italian Serie A	1st place, gold medalist(s)	3rd place, bronze medalist(s)	1st place, gold medalist(s)			
2019	European Championships			4			
2019	3rd Italian Serie A	1st place, gold medalist(s)	2nd place, silver medalist(s)	2nd place, silver medalist(s)			
2019	Heerenveen Friendly	1st place, gold medalist(s)	5				
2019	Italian Championships		1st place, gold medalist(s)	1st place, gold medalist(s)			
2019	World Championships	3rd place, bronze medalist(s)					
2020	1st Italian Serie A	1st place, gold medalist(s)		1st place, gold medalist(s)		2nd place, silver medalist(s)	
2020	3rd Italian Serie A	1st place, gold medalist(s)		3rd place, bronze medalist(s)			
2020	National Championships		1st place, gold medalist(s)	1st place, gold medalist(s)	3rd place, bronze medalist(s)	3rd place, bronze medalist(s)	2nd place, silver medalist(s)
2021	National Championships		2nd place, silver medalist(s)		3rd place, bronze medalist(s)		
2021	Olympic Games	4					
2021	World Championships	—N/a	12	2nd place, silver medalist(s)		R3	
2022	1st Italian Serie A	1st place, gold medalist(s)	1st place, gold medalist(s)		2nd place, silver medalist(s)		3rd place, bronze medalist(s)
2022	2nd Italian Serie A	1st place, gold medalist(s)				2nd place, silver medalist(s)	3rd place, bronze medalist(s)
2022	DTB Pokal Team Challenge	2nd place, silver medalist(s)		2nd place, silver medalist(s)			
2022	City of Jesolo Trophy	2nd place, silver medalist(s)	2nd place, silver medalist(s)	2nd place, silver medalist(s)	6	5	
2022	Mediterranean Games	1st place, gold medalist(s)	2nd place, silver medalist(s)	1st place, gold medalist(s)		2nd place, silver medalist(s)	1st place, gold medalist(s)
2022	European Championships	1st place, gold medalist(s)	1st place, gold medalist(s)	2nd place, silver medalist(s)		WD	
2023	City of Jesolo Trophy	1st place, gold medalist(s)		2nd place, silver medalist(s)		8	
2023	European Championships	2nd place, silver medalist(s)		2nd place, silver medalist(s)			
2023	Cairo World Cup			2nd place, silver medalist(s)		WD	
2024	City of Jesolo Trophy	1st place, gold medalist(s)	3rd place, bronze medalist(s)		7	3rd place, bronze medalist(s)	
2024	European Championships	1st place, gold medalist(s)					
2025	National Championships		4				
2025	World Championships	—N/a	5				
