= 2024 European Women's Artistic Gymnastics Championships =

- Venue: Rimini Fiera
- Location: Rimini, Italy
- Start date: 2 May 2024
- End date: 5 May 2024
- Competitors: 289 from 37 nations

The 35th European Women's Artistic Gymnastics Championships were held from 2–5 May 2024 in Rimini, Italy. The competition served as Olympic qualification for one individual berth, which was won by Belgium's Maellyse Brassart.

== Schedule ==
Date	Session	Time	Subdivisions
Thursday, 2 May
Thursday, 2 May	Senior All-Around Final and Qualification for Team & Individual Apparatus Finals	10:00 – 12:05	Subdivision 1
Thursday, 2 May	Senior All-Around Final and Qualification for Team & Individual Apparatus Finals	12:30 – 14:35	Subdivision 2
Thursday, 2 May	Senior All-Around Final and Qualification for Team & Individual Apparatus Finals	15:30 – 17:35	Subdivision 3
Thursday, 2 May	Senior All-Around Final and Qualification for Team & Individual Apparatus Finals	18:00 – 20:00	Subdivision 4
Friday, 3 May	Junior Team & All-Around Finals and Qualification for Individual Apparatus Finals	10:00 – 12:05	Subdivision 1
Friday, 3 May	Junior Team & All-Around Finals and Qualification for Individual Apparatus Finals	12:30 – 14:35	Subdivision 2
Friday, 3 May	Junior Team & All-Around Finals and Qualification for Individual Apparatus Finals	15:30 – 17:35	Subdivision 3
Friday, 3 May	Junior Team & All-Around Finals and Qualification for Individual Apparatus Finals	18:00 – 20:00	Subdivision 4
Saturday, 4 May	Senior Individual Apparatus Finals	16:25 – 19:45	Vault, Uneven bars, Balance beam, Floor
Sunday, 5 May	Junior Individual Apparatus Finals	10:00 – 13:19	Vault, Uneven bars, Balance beam, Floor
Sunday, 5 May	Senior Team Final	15:00 – 17:12	Top 8 from qualification
All times listed in local time (UTC+01:00).

== Medals summary ==
=== Medalists ===
Event	Gold	Silver	Bronze
Senior
Team	Italy; Angela Andreoli; Alice D'Amato; Asia D'Amato; Manila Esposito; Elisa Iorio	(United Kingdom) Great Britain; Becky Downie; Ruby Evans; Georgia-Mae Fenton; Alice Kinsella; Abigail Martin	France; Marine Boyer; Lorette Charpy; Coline Devillard; Morgane Osyssek; Ming van Eijken
All-Around	Manila Esposito; Italy	Alice D'Amato; Italy	Alice Kinsella; Great Britain
Vault	Coline Devillard; France	Valentina Georgieva; Bulgaria	Ming van Eijken; France
Uneven bars	Alice D'Amato; Italy	Elisa Iorio; Italy	Georgia-Mae Fenton; Great Britain
Balance beam	Manila Esposito; Italy	Sabrina Voinea; Romania	Marine Boyer; France
Floor	Manila Esposito; Italy	Sabrina Voinea; Romania	Angela Andreoli; Italy
Junior
Team	France; Noélie Ayuso; Lola Chassat; Elena Colas; Perla Denéchère; Maïana Prat	Italy; Emma Fioravanti; Benedetta Gava; Giulia Perotti; Emma Puato	Belgium; Katie Baert; Louise Dupont; Sien Ghekiere; Silke Hoste; Liese Vieuxtemps
All-around	Elena Colas; France	Giulia Perotti; Italy	Maïana Prat; France
Vault	Benedetta Gava; Italy	Emma Puato; Italy	Elena Colas; France
Uneven bars	Giulia Perotti; Italy Elena Colas; France	None awarded	Sien Ghekiere; Belgium Lola Chassat; France
Balance beam	Maïana Prat; France	Madita Mayr; Germany	Giulia Perotti; Italy
Floor	Giulia Perotti; Italy	Emma Fioravanti; Italy	Perla Denéchère; France

=== Medal standings ===
==== Overall ====
* Host nation (Italy)

Rank	Nation	Gold	Silver	Bronze	Total
1	Italy (ITA)*	8	6	2	16
2	France (FRA)	5	0	7	12
3	Romania (ROU)	0	2	0	2
4	Great Britain (GBR)	0	1	2	3
5	Bulgaria (BUL)	0	1	0	1
5	Germany (GER)	0	1	0	1
7	Belgium (BEL)	0	0	2	2
Totals (7 entries)		13	11	13	37

==== Senior ====
* Host nation (Italy)

Rank	Nation	Gold	Silver	Bronze	Total
1	Italy (ITA)*	5	2	1	8
2	France (FRA)	1	0	3	4
3	Romania (ROU)	0	2	0	2
4	Great Britain (GBR)	0	1	2	3
5	Bulgaria (BUL)	0	1	0	1
Totals (5 entries)		6	6	6	18

==== Junior ====
* Host nation (Italy)

Rank	Nation	Gold	Silver	Bronze	Total
1	France (FRA)	4	0	4	8
2	Italy (ITA)*	3	4	1	8
3	Germany (GER)	0	1	0	1
4	Belgium (BEL)	0	0	2	2
Totals (4 entries)		7	5	7	19

== Senior results ==
=== Team competition ===
Oldest and youngest competitors

	Name	Country	Date of birth	Age
Youngest	Marina Escudero	Spain	7 November 2008	15 years, 5 months and 28 days
Oldest	Lieke Wevers	Netherlands	17 September 1991	32 years, 7 months and 18 days

Rank	Team	Vault (gymnastics)	Uneven bars	Balance beam	Floor (gymnastics)	Total
1st place, gold medalist(s)	Italy	41.232	42.999	40.032	39.899	164.162
1st place, gold medalist(s)	Alice D'Amato	14.066	14.566	13.500		164.162
1st place, gold medalist(s)	Asia D'Amato					164.162
1st place, gold medalist(s)	Manila Esposito	13.600	14.133	13.966	13.800	164.162
1st place, gold medalist(s)	Elisa Iorio		14.300		12.566	164.162
1st place, gold medalist(s)	Angela Andreoli	13.566		12.566	13.533	164.162
2nd place, silver medalist(s)	Great Britain	41.832	42.165	37.966	40.199	162.162
2nd place, silver medalist(s)	Abigail Martin				13.166	162.162
2nd place, silver medalist(s)	Alice Kinsella	14.100	13.766	13.233	13.633	162.162
2nd place, silver medalist(s)	Georgia-Mae Fenton	13.666	13.766	11.900		162.162
2nd place, silver medalist(s)	Rebecca Downie		14.633	12.833		162.162
2nd place, silver medalist(s)	Ruby Evans	14.066			13.400	162.162
3rd place, bronze medalist(s)	France	42.032	38.599	38.899	39.266	158.796
3rd place, bronze medalist(s)	Morgane Osyssek-Reimer		13.000	12.200	13.100	158.796
3rd place, bronze medalist(s)	Coline Devillard	14.433		12.966		158.796
3rd place, bronze medalist(s)	Lorette Charpy		12.433			158.796
3rd place, bronze medalist(s)	Marine Boyer	13.233	13.166	13.733	12.733	158.796
3rd place, bronze medalist(s)	Ming van Eijken	14.366			13.433	158.796
4	Romania	39.499	39.000	38.498	39.400	156.397
4	Ana Bărbosu	13.800	13.500	12.866	13.200	156.397
4	Lilia Cosman	12.066	13.200			156.397
4	Amalia Ghigoarță		12.300	12.966	12.600	156.397
4	Sabrina Voinea	13.633		12.666	13.600	156.397
4	Maria Ceplinschi					156.397
5	Spain	39.966	38.932	37.999	37.065	153.962
5	Laura Casabuena		12.766			153.962
5	Laia Masferrer	13.600		11.633	12.466	153.962
5	Ana Pérez		13.100	12.966	11.366	153.962
5	Marina Escudero	12.900				153.962
5	Alba Petisco	13.466	13.066	13.400	13.233	153.962
6	Germany	40.000	39.799	36.799	36.332	152.930
6	Karina Schönmaier	13.700	13.000		12.433	152.930
6	Janoah Müller			12.133	11.533	152.930
6	Marlene Gotthardt	13.100		12.533	12.366	152.930
6	Helen Kevric		13.966			152.930
6	Silja Stöhr	13.200	12.833	12.133		152.930
7	Netherlands	39.466	37.166	35.632	37.299	149.563
7	Vera van Pol	13.700	13.000	12.366	13.033	149.563
7	Elisabeth Geurts	12.566	11.433		11.666	149.563
7	Tisha Volleman	13.200	12.733		12.600	149.563
7	Floor Slooff			11.800		149.563
7	Lieke Wevers			11.466		149.563
8	Sweden	38.432	40.032	33.832	36.300	148.596
8	Nathalie Westlund	12.933	13.833	10.233	11.700	148.596
8	Jennifer Williams	13.166	12.866	11.933	12.800	148.596
8	Elina Gravin	12.333		11.666		148.596
8	Tonya Paulsson		13.333			148.596
8	Maya Ståhl				11.800	148.596

=== Individual all-around ===
86 gymnasts took part in the individual all-around competition with no prior qualification round. The following is the top 10 of the all-around. Although multiple gymnasts per country were able to compete on all four apparatuses, only a max of two gymnasts per country were eligible for ranking. Therefore Angela Andreoli, who recorded the third highest score, was ineligible to receive the bronze medal because two of her compatriots ranked higher.

Position	Gymnast	Vault (gymnastics)	Uneven bars	Balance beam	Floor (gymnastics)	Total
1st place, gold medalist(s)	Manila Esposito (ITA)	13.566	14.066	14.200	13.600	55.432
2nd place, silver medalist(s)	Alice D'Amato (ITA)	13.966	14.633	13.766	12.466	54.831
–	Angela Andreoli (ITA)	13.633	13.033	13.700	13.400	53.766
3rd place, bronze medalist(s)	Alice Kinsella (GBR)	14.000	13.333	12.800	13.466	53.599
4	Sabrina Voinea (ROU)	13.600	11.300	14.100	13.700	52.700
5	Alba Petisco (ESP)	13.400	13.000	13.133	13.166	52.699
6	Georgia-Mae Fenton (GBR)	13.633	13.733	12.466	12.833	52.665
7	Morgane Osyssek (FRA)	13.166	13.000	12.866	13.400	52.432
8	Lilia Cosman (ROU)	13.400	13.100	13.266	12.600	52.366
9	Zója Székely (HUN)	13.000	13.666	12.833	12.533	52.032

=== Vault ===
Oldest and youngest competitors

	Name	Country	Date of birth	Age
Youngest	Marlene Gotthardt	Germany	30 July 2008	15 years, 9 months and 4 days
Oldest	Coline Devillard	France	9 October 2000	23 years, 6 months and 25 days

Position	Gymnast	Vault 1				Vault 2				Total
Position	Gymnast	D Score	E Score	Pen.	Score 1	D Score	E Score	Pen.	Score 2	Total
1st place, gold medalist(s)	(France) Coline Devillard	5.4	8.966		14.366	4.4	8.966		13.366	13.866
2nd place, silver medalist(s)	(Bulgaria) Valentina Georgieva	5.0	9.066		14.066	4.4	9.133		13.533	13.799
3rd place, bronze medalist(s)	(France) Ming Van Eijken	5.4	8.833	0.100	14.133	4.4	8.866		13.266	13.699
4	(Romania) Ana Bărbosu	5.0	8.700		13.700	4.8	8.833		13.633	13.666
5	(Germany) Karina Schönmaier	4.8	8.866	0.100	13.566	4.2	9.166		13.366	13.466
6	(Denmark) Camille Rasmussen	5.0	8.633	0.300	13.333	4.4	8.666		13.066	13.199
7	(Germany) Marlene Gotthardt	4.6	8.800		13.400	4.2	8.733		12.933	13.166
8	(Hungary) Sára Péter	4.2	9.066		13.266	4.4	8.800		12.800	13.033

=== Uneven bars ===
Oldest and youngest competitors

	Name	Country	Date of birth	Age
Youngest	Helen Kevric	Germany	21 March 2008	16 years, 1 month and 13 days
Oldest	Becky Downie	Great Britain	24 January 1992	32 years, 3 months and 10 days

Position	Gymnast	D Score	E Score	Penalty	Total
1st place, gold medalist(s)	(Italy) Alice D'Amato	6.3	8.300		14.600
2nd place, silver medalist(s)	(Italy) Elisa Iorio	6.3	8.066		14.366
3rd place, bronze medalist(s)	(United Kingdom) Georgia-Mae Fenton	5.8	8.100		13.900
4	(Germany) Helen Kevric	6.2	7.666		13.866
5	(Portugal) Ana Filipa Martins	5.4	8.300		13.700
6	(Sweden) Nathalie Westlund	5.6	8.100		13.700
7	(United Kingdom) Rebecca Downie	6.6	7.033		13.633
8	(Hungary) Zója Székely	6.1	6.600		12.700

=== Balance beam ===
Oldest and youngest competitors

	Name	Country	Date of birth	Age
Youngest	Polina Diachenko	Ukraine	25 July 2008	15 years, 9 months and 9 days
Oldest	Ana Pérez	Spain	14 December 1997	26 years, 4 months and 20 days

Position	Gymnast	D Score	E Score	Penalty	Total
1st place, gold medalist(s)	(Italy) Manila Esposito	6.1	8.300		14.400
2nd place, silver medalist(s)	(Romania) Sabrina Voinea	6.5	7.666		14.166
3rd place, bronze medalist(s)	(France) Marine Boyer	6.0	8.033		14.033
4	(Romania) Lilia Cosman	5.9	7.600		13.500
5	(Italy) Alice D'Amato	5.4	7.866		13.266
6	(Spain) Alba Petisco	5.6	7.433		13.033
7	(Spain) Ana Pérez	5.2	7.733		12.933
8	(Ukraine) Polina Diachenko	5.1	7.400		12.500

=== Floor ===
Oldest and youngest competitors

	Name	Country	Date of birth	Age
Youngest	Abigail Martin	Great Britain	19 April 2008	16 years and 15 days
Oldest	Alice Kinsella	Great Britain	13 March 2001	23 years, 1 month and 21 days

Position	Gymnast	D Score	E Score	Penalty	Total
1st place, gold medalist(s)	(Italy) Manila Esposito	5.7	8.133		13.833
2nd place, silver medalist(s)	(Romania) Sabrina Voinea	5.9	7.900	0.100	13.700
3rd place, bronze medalist(s)	(Italy) Angela Andreoli	5.9	7.766		13.666
4	(United Kingdom) Alice Kinsella	5.6	8.033		13.633
5	(France) Morgane Osyssek-Reimer	5.5	7.800		13.300
6	(Spain) Alba Petisco	5.3	7.933		13.233
7	(United Kingdom) Abigail Martin	5.8	7.500	0.100	13.200
8	(France) Ming van Eijken	5.2	7.600	0.100	12.700

== Junior results ==
=== Team competition ===
There were 26 teams in the team competition with no prior qualification round. The following displays the top eight teams.
Oldest and youngest competitors

	Name	Country	Date of birth	Age
Youngest				
Oldest				

Rank	Team	Vault (gymnastics)	Uneven bars	Balance beam	Floor (gymnastics)	Total
1st place, gold medalist(s)	France	39.865	38.933	38.099	38.866	155.763
1st place, gold medalist(s)	Noélie Ayuso			12.566		155.763
1st place, gold medalist(s)	Lola Chassat		12.900			155.763
1st place, gold medalist(s)	Elena Colas	13.866	13.900		13.033	155.763
1st place, gold medalist(s)	Perla Denéchère	12.966		12.700	12.933	155.763
1st place, gold medalist(s)	Maïana Prat	13.033	12.133	12.833	12.900	155.763
2nd place, silver medalist(s)	Italy	40.665	38.165	35.432	39.265	153.527
2nd place, silver medalist(s)	Emma Fioravanti	13.366	12.066	11.166	13.266	153.527
2nd place, silver medalist(s)	Benedetta Gava	13.866		11.833	12.833	153.527
2nd place, silver medalist(s)	Giulia Perotti		13.733	12.433	13.166	153.527
2nd place, silver medalist(s)	Emma Puato	13.433	12.366			153.527
3rd place, bronze medalist(s)	Belgium	38.466	36.132	37.899	36.165	148.662
3rd place, bronze medalist(s)	Katie Baert	12.966	11.800			148.662
3rd place, bronze medalist(s)	Louise Dupont	12.800	11.766	12.700	11.833	148.662
3rd place, bronze medalist(s)	Sien Ghekiere	12.700	12.566	12.533		148.662
3rd place, bronze medalist(s)	Silke Hoste				11.866	148.662
3rd place, bronze medalist(s)	Liese Vieuxtemps			12.666	12.466	148.662
4	Germany	37.866	36.799	37.366	36.032	148.063
4	Anni Bantel		12.300	12.000	12.133	148.063
4	Jesenia Schäfer	12.466			11.966	148.063
4	Michaela Mühlhofer	12.500	12.366	12.300		148.063
4	Charleen Pach		12.133			148.063
4	Madita Mayr	12.900		13.066	11.933	148.063
5	United Kingdom	38.633	36.832	35.466	36.600	147.531
5	Shantae-Eve Amankwaah	12.800	12.800	11.700	12.400	147.531
5	Ellie Lewis		12.366			147.531
5	Isabelle Priestley	12.833				147.531
5	Jemima Taylor	13.000		11.900	12.200	147.531
5	Tahlia Wyatt		11.666	11.866	12.000	147.531
6	Switzerland	38.033	32.399	36.366	36.332	143.130
6	Lia Schumacher	12.300	11.733	12.366	11.966	143.130
6	Kea Walser	13.033	11.233	12.200	12.233	143.130
6	Lyris Azhan			11.800		143.130
6	Matilda Pohl		9.433			143.130
6	Joya Dübi	12.700			12.133	143.130
7	Ukraine	36.366	36.598	34.899	35.199	143.062
7	Maryna Klishchevska			12.166	11.800	143.062
7	Bohdana Kovalova	11.966	11.566			143.062
7	Kristina Hrudetska		12.566		11.666	143.062
7	Anastasiia Lev	12.100	12.466	10.800		143.062
7	Daria Chorna	12.300		11.933	11.733	143.062
8	Romania	38.799	30.733	36.566	35.965	142.063
8	Alexia Blănaru	13.066		12.400	12.166	142.063
8	Adelina Ionescu	12.933	9.533			142.063
8	Anamaria Mihăescu	12.800	10.700	12.400	12.066	142.063
8	Evelina Papana			11.766	11.733	142.063
8	Ariana Cotu		10.500			142.063

=== Individual all-around ===
84 gymnasts took part in the individual all-around competition with no prior qualification round. The following is the top 10 of the all-around. Although multiple gymnasts per country were able to compete on all four apparatuses, only a max of two gymnasts per country were eligible for ranking. Therefore Benedetta Gava and Emma Puato, who recorded the fifth and tenth highest scores respectively, were ineligible to be ranked because two of their compatriots ranked higher.

Position	Gymnast	Vault (gymnastics)	Uneven bars	Balance beam	Floor (gymnastics)	Total
1st place, gold medalist(s)	Elena Colas (FRA)	13.866	13.900	12.466	13.033	53.265
2nd place, silver medalist(s)	Giulia Perotti (ITA)	13.166	13.733	12.433	13.166	52.498
3rd place, bronze medalist(s)	Maïana Prat (FRA)	13.033	12.133	12.833	12.900	50.899
4	Emma Fioravanti (ITA)	13.366	12.066	11.166	13.266	49.864
–	Benedetta Gava (ITA)	13.866	11.266	11.833	12.833	49.798
5	Shantae-Eve Amankwaah (GBR)	12.800	12.800	11.700	12.400	49.700
6	Madita Mayr (GER)	12.900	11.766	13.066	11.933	49.665
7	Sien Ghekiere (BEL)	12.700	12.566	12.533	11.733	49.532
8	Louise Dupont (BEL)	12.800	11.766	12.700	11.833	49.099
–	Emma Puato (ITA)	13.433	12.366	10.333	12.700	48.832

=== Vault ===
Oldest and youngest competitors

	Name	Country	Date of birth	Age
Youngest				
Oldest				

Position	Gymnast	Vault 1				Vault 2				Total
Position	Gymnast	D Score	E Score	Pen.	Score 1	D Score	E Score	Pen.	Score 2	Total
1st place, gold medalist(s)	(Italy) Benedetta Gava	5.0	9.033		14.033	4.2	9.100		13.300	13.666
2nd place, silver medalist(s)	(Italy) Emma Puato	4.6	8.900		13.500	4.2	9.100		13.300	13.400
3rd place, bronze medalist(s)	(France) Elena Colas	5.0	8.833	0.300	13.533	4.2	8.900		13.100	13.316
4	(Germany) Madita Mayr	4.2	8.700		12.900	3.8	8.933		12.733	12.816
5	(Switzerland) Kea Walser	4.2	8.900		13.100	3.6	8.866		12.466	12.783
6	(United Kingdom) Isabelle Priestley	4.2	8.733		12.933	4.0	8.600	0.100	12.500	12.716
7	(Netherlands) Alij de Wijze	4.2	8.833		13.033	3.6	8.766		12.366	12.699
8	(Romania) Anamaria Mihăescu	4.2	8.600		12.800	3.8	8.633	0.100	12.333	12.566

=== Uneven bars ===
Oldest and youngest competitors

	Name	Country	Date of birth	Age
Youngest				
Oldest				

Position	Gymnast	D Score	E Score	Penalty	Total
1st place, gold medalist(s)	(France) Elena Colas	6.0	7.866		13.866
1st place, gold medalist(s)	(Italy) Giulia Perotti	5.7	8.166		13.866
3rd place, bronze medalist(s)	(France) Lola Chassat	4.8	7.933		12.733
3rd place, bronze medalist(s)	(Belgium) Sien Ghekiere	5.1	7.633		12.733
5	(United Kingdom) Shantae-Eve Amankwaah	4.9	7.700		12.600
5	(Ukraine) Kristina Hrudetska	4.9	7.700		12.600
7	(Ukraine) Anastasiia Lev	4.8	7.533		12.333
8	(United Kingdom) Ellie Lewis	4.3	7.433		11.733

=== Balance beam ===
Oldest and youngest competitors

	Name	Country	Date of birth	Age
Youngest				
Oldest				

Position	Gymnast	D Score	E Score	Penalty	Total
1st place, gold medalist(s)	(France) Maïana Prat	5.3	8.000		13.300
2nd place, silver medalist(s)	(Germany) Madita Mayr	4.8	8.066		12.866
3rd place, bronze medalist(s)	(Italy) Giulia Perotti	5.2	7.400		12.600
4	(Belgium) Louise Dupont	4.5	7.666		12.166
5	(Belgium) Liese Vieuxtemps	4.3	7.600		11.900
6	(Romania) Anamaria Mihăescu	4.8	6.766		11.566
7	(France) Perla Denéchère	4.7	6.666		11.366
8	(Romania) Alexia Blănaru	4.8	5.766		10.566

=== Floor ===
Oldest and youngest competitors

	Name	Country	Date of birth	Age
Youngest				
Oldest				

Position	Gymnast	D Score	E Score	Penalty	Total
1st place, gold medalist(s)	(Italy) Giulia Perotti	5.1	8.300		13.400
2nd place, silver medalist(s)	(Italy) Emma Fioravanti	5.4	7.700		13.100
3rd place, bronze medalist(s)	(France) Perla Denéchère	5.1	7.833		12.933
4	(France) Elena Colas	5.1	7.633	0.100	12.633
5	(Belgium) Liese Vieuxtemps	4.5	8.000		12.500
6	(United Kingdom) Shantae-Eve Amankwaah	4.7	7.700		12.400
7	(Switzerland) Kea Walser	4.3	7.666		11.966
8	(Netherlands) Jaylee Chukwu	4.8	6.400		11.200
