= Alexia Blănaru =

Romanian artistic gymnast (born 2010)

- Full name: Alexia Elena Blănaru
- Born: May 22, 2010 (age 16) Bacău, Romania

Gymnastics career
- Discipline: Women's artistic gymnastics
- Country represented: Romania
- Club: SCM Bacău
- Head coaches: Vasilica Agop; Cornel Agop
- Assistant coach: Adela Popa
Medal record
Women's artistic gymnastics
Representing Romania
Junior World Championships
Bronze medal – third place	2025 Manila	Vault
FIG World Cup
Event	1st	2nd	3rd
World Challenge Cup	1	0	0
Total	1	0	0

Alexia Elena Blănaru (born May 22, 2010) is a Romanian artistic gymnast. She is the 2025 Junior World bronze medalist on vault. She is also the 2026 Romanian National Champion.

== Junior career ==
=== 2024 ===
Blănaru made her international debut at the 2024 DTB Pokal Team Challenge, winning the gold medal on vault and contributing to Romania's sixth-place finish as a team. At the Rising Stars Trophy in April, she once again won gold on vault, in addition to silver on floor exercise.

In May 2024, Blănaru competed at the 2024 European Championships, where the Romanian team finished eighth. She also recorded the seventh-highest single-vault score of the qualification round. After qualifying for the balance beam final, she ultimately finished eighth.

Blănaru won the gold medal in the all-around at the 2024 Gymnasiade. During event finals, she earned two additional silver medals on vault and floor exercise.

At the Romanian Individual Championships, Blănaru placed fifth in the all-around, which featured both senior and junior athletes. During junior event finals, she finished sixth on vault and floor and eighth on uneven bars.

=== 2025 ===
Blănaru began 2025 by competing at the International Gymnix in March. The Romanian junior team finished fourth, and individually, Blanaru finished 17th in the all-around.

In June, Blănaru won a medal on every event at the Romanian Junior Championships, including gold in the all-around, on vault, and on balance beam. She achieved similar results at the Romanian National Championships, winning all-around silver in the combined junior and senior all-around, as well as uneven bars and balance beam gold in the junior division.

Blănaru was named to the Romanian team for the European Youth Olympic Festival. She won the bronze medal in the all-around and silver on vault.

Alongside teammates Iris Iordache and Aniela Tudor, Blănaru represented Romania at the 2025 Junior World Championships. Romania finished fifth as a team, and Blanaru qualified for the all-around final, where she finished 13th. During event finals, she won the bronze medal on vault behind Lavi Crain of the United States and Misa Nishiyama of Japan. She also qualified for the balance beam final, placing seventh.

== Senior career ==
=== 2026 ===
Blănaru made her senior debut at the 2026 City of Jesolo Trophy, placing 18th in the all-around and sixth in the floor final. In May, she attended the Koper World Challenge Cup. She won the gold medal on balance beam ahead of Tina Zelčić of Croatia and Alia Leat of Great Britain. Additionally, she qualified for the vault final and placed eighth.

After being named the Romanian team for the 2026 European Championships, Blănaru placed 18th in the all-around. Romania's performance at the competition qualified the nation to send a full team to the 2026 World Championships in Rotterdam.

In September, Blănaru became the 2026 Romanian Senior National All-Around Champion. The following month, she was named to the Romanian team for the World Championships, along with teammates Daria Tănasă, Ariana Coțu, Iris Iordache, Anamaria Mihăescu, and Sabrina Voinea.

== Competitive history ==
Competitive history of Alexia Blănaru at the junior level
Year	Event	Team	AA	VT	UB	BB	FX
2023	Romanian Junior Championships			1st place, gold medalist(s)		4	5
2024	DTB Pokal Team Challenge	6		1st place, gold medalist(s)			
2024	Rising Stars Trophy			1st place, gold medalist(s)			2nd place, silver medalist(s)
2024	European Championships	8				8	
2024	Gymnasiade		1st place, gold medalist(s)	2nd place, silver medalist(s)		5	2nd place, silver medalist(s)
2024	Romanian Individual Championships		5	6	8		6
2025	International Gymnix	4	17				
2025	Romanian Junior Championships		1st place, gold medalist(s)	1st place, gold medalist(s)	3rd place, bronze medalist(s)	1st place, gold medalist(s)	3rd place, bronze medalist(s)
2025	European Youth Olympic Festival		3rd place, bronze medalist(s)	2nd place, silver medalist(s)		4	5
2025	Romanian Championships		2nd place, silver medalist(s)		1st place, gold medalist(s)	1st place, gold medalist(s)	6
2025	Junior World Championships	5	13	3rd place, bronze medalist(s)		7	

Competitive history of Alexia Blănaru at the senior level
Year	Event	Team	AA	VT	UB	BB	FX
2026	City of Jesolo Trophy	8	18				6
2026	Koper World Challenge Cup			8		1st place, gold medalist(s)	
2026	Rising Stars Trophy		1st place, gold medalist(s)	1st place, gold medalist(s)	3rd place, bronze medalist(s)	2nd place, silver medalist(s)	2nd place, silver medalist(s)
2026	European Championships	11	18				
2026	Romanian Championships		1st place, gold medalist(s)				
2026	World Championships						
