= Manila Esposito =

Italian artistic gymnast (born 2006)

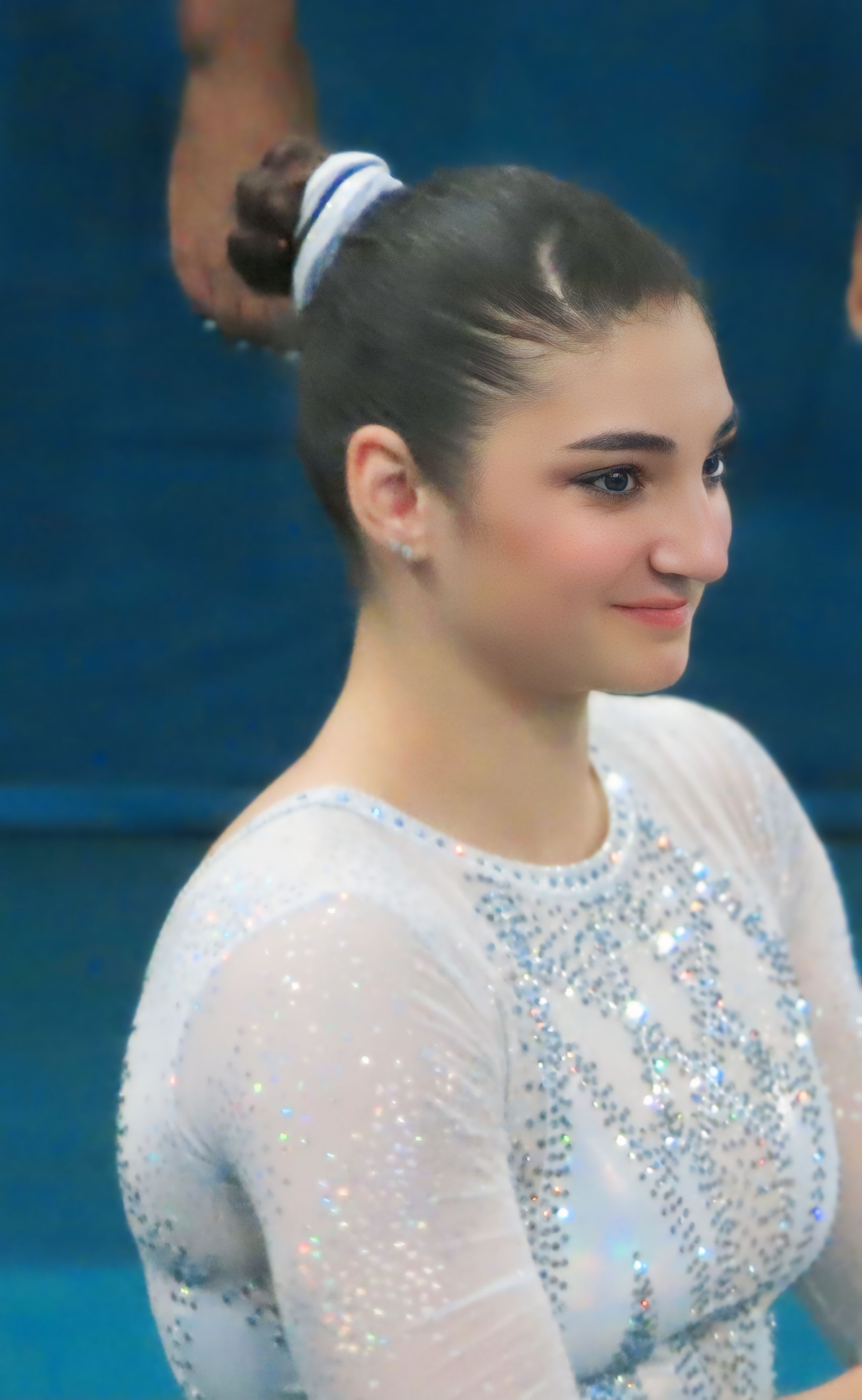
- Esposito at the 2024 Olympic Games

Personal information
- Born: 2 November 2006 (age 19) Boscotrecase, Campania, Italy

Gymnastics career
- Discipline: Women's artistic gymnastics
- Country represented: Italy; (2019–present)
- Club: Fiamme Oro
- Gym: Ginnastica Civitavecchia
Medal record
Representing Italy
Olympic Games
Silver medal – second place	2024 Paris	Team
Bronze medal – third place	2024 Paris	Balance beam
European Championships
Gold medal – first place	2024 Rimini	Team
Gold medal – first place	2024 Rimini	All-around
Gold medal – first place	2024 Rimini	Balance beam
Gold medal – first place	2024 Rimini	Floor exercise
Gold medal – first place	2025 Leipzig	Team
Gold medal – first place	2025 Leipzig	All-around
Gold medal – first place	2026 Zagreb	Floor exercise
Silver medal – second place	2023 Antalya	Team
Silver medal – second place	2023 Antalya	Balance beam
Silver medal – second place	2025 Leipzig	Floor exercise
Silver medal – second place	2026 Zagreb	Team
Silver medal – second place	2026 Zagreb	Balance beam
Bronze medal – third place	2025 Leipzig	Mixed team
FIG World Cup
Event / 1st / 2nd / 3rd; Apparatus World Cup / 2 / 1 / 0

Manila Esposito (born 2 November 2006) is an Italian artistic gymnast. She was a member of the silver medal-winning team at the 2024 Olympic Games where she also won a bronze medal on the balance beam. She is a two-time European all-around champion (2024, 2025), and has won European gold on beam (2024), floor (2024 and 2026), and with the team (2024 and 2025).

== Early life ==
Esposito was born in Boscotrecase to Luciano and Margherita Esposito. She began gymnastics at age four when her mother began noticing her athletic abilities. When she was five years old, her family moved to Civitavecchia.

== Gymnastics career ==
=== 2022 ===
Esposito competed at the DTB Pokal Mixed Cup and won the bronze medal with the Italian team behind the United States and Germany. She then competed at the City of Jesolo Trophy where she finished tenth in the all-around with a total score of 51.200. She won the all-around title at the Joaquim Blume Memorial with a total score of 53.300. She won the all-around bronze medal at the Italian Championships behind Martina Maggio and Alice D'Amato. In the event finals, she won the gold medal on the vault, the silver medal on the balance beam, the bronze medal on the uneven bars, and she placed fourth on the floor exercise. She was then selected to compete at the World Championships alongside Maggio, D'Amato, Giorgia Villa, and Veronica Mandriota. The team qualified for the team final, where they finished fifth.

=== 2023 ===
Esposito competed at the Cottbus World Cup on the vault and floor exercise. In the vault final, she won the gold medal by completing a Yurchenko 1.5 and a Podkopayeva for a 13.233 average. She won a silver medal in the floor final behind Japan's Kokufugata Azuki.

At the 2023 European Championships in Antalya, she won the silver medal on the beam. Additionally, she was a member of the team to win the silver medal in the team final alongside Alice D'Amato, Asia D'Amato, Angela Andreoli, and Giorgia Villa.

At the World Championships in Antwerp, she finished fifth with the Italian team consisting of Angela Andreoli, Arianna Belardelli, Alice D’Amato, and Elisa Iorio. Individually, she was ninth in the all round final.

=== 2024 ===
Esposito competed at the 2024 European Championships alongside Alice D'Amato, Asia D'Amato, Angela Andreoli, and Elisa Iorio. On the first day of competition, Esposito won the all-around competition and became the third Italian woman to achieve this feat. During event finals, she picked up another two gold medals, winning on both balance beam and floor exercise. On the final day of competition, the team final, Esposito contributed scores on all four apparatuses, helping Italy win their third European team title.

In July, Esposito competed at the Italian Championships, where she placed second in the all-around. At the conclusion of the competition, she was named to the team to represent Italy at the 2024 Summer Olympics alongside Alice D'Amato, Andreoli, Iorio, and Giorgia Villa.

At the 2024 Olympic Games, Esposito helped Italy qualify to the team final in second place. Individually, she qualified for the all-around, balance beam, and floor exercise finals. During the team final, Esposito contributed scores on vault, balance beam, and floor exercise towards Italy's second-place finish, tying Italy's highest Olympic team placement. The last time Italy won this medal was 96 years prior at the 1928 Olympic Games. During the all-around final, Esposito placed fourteenth. On the final day of competition, Esposito competed in the balance beam final, earning a score of 14.000 and winning the bronze medal behind compatriot D'Amato and Zhou Yaqin of China. Additionally, Esposito placed ninth on floor exercise.

=== 2025 ===
Esposito returned to competition at the 2025 City of Jesolo Trophy where she helped Italy win gold as a team. Individually, she won gold in the all-around and on balance beam and placed fourth on floor exercise.

She was selected for the team to compete at the 2025 European Championships alongside Alice D'Amato, Giulia Perotti, Emma Fioravanti, and Sofia Tonelli. They went on to win the gold medal in the team final, successfully defending Italy's title from the previous year. She competed in the mixed team event, winning the bronze medal with Lorenzo Minh Casali. Individually, she won the all-around competition, again retaining her title from 2024. She also qualified to the uneven bars, balance beam, and floor event finals, winning the silver medal on floor exercise behind Romania's Ana Bărbosu.

=== 2026 ===
Esposito competed at the European Championships alongside Elisa Iorio, July Marano, Giulia Perotti, and Anthea Sisio; she only competed on floor exercise and balance beam and qualified to both event finals. In the balance beam final she won the silver medal behind Elena Colas and won gold on floor exercise. On the final day of the competition, the team final, she contributed scores on floor exercise and balance beam, helping the Italian team win the silver medal behind Russia.

== Competitive history ==
Competitive history of Manila Esposito at the junior level
Year	Event	Team	AA	VT	UB	BB	FX
2018	1st Italian Serie A	11					
2018	2nd Italian Serie A	5					
2018	3rd Italian Serie A	7					
2019	2nd Italian Serie A	3rd place, bronze medalist(s)					
2019	3rd Italian Serie A	3rd place, bronze medalist(s)					
2019	Sainté Gym Cup	2nd place, silver medalist(s)	10				
2019	Mediterranean Championships	1st place, gold medalist(s)	5			3rd place, bronze medalist(s)	
2020	1st Italian Serie A	6					
2020	2nd Italian Serie A	2nd place, silver medalist(s)					
2020	3rd Italian Serie A	2nd place, silver medalist(s)					
2020	Italian Championships		9	2nd place, silver medalist(s)	7		
2021	1st Italian Serie A	2nd place, silver medalist(s)					
2021	2nd Italian Serie A	1st place, gold medalist(s)					
2021	3rd Italian Serie A	3rd place, bronze medalist(s)					
2021	FIT Challenge	1st place, gold medalist(s)	1st place, gold medalist(s)	1st place, gold medalist(s)	2nd place, silver medalist(s)		1st place, gold medalist(s)
2021	Italian Championships		6	2nd place, silver medalist(s)		2nd place, silver medalist(s)	
2021	Élite Gym Massilia	1st place, gold medalist(s)	6				

Competitive history of Manila Esposito at the senior level
Year	Event	Team	AA	VT	UB	BB	FX
2022	1st Italian Serie A	2nd place, silver medalist(s)					
2022	2nd Italian Serie A	2nd place, silver medalist(s)					
2022	DTB Pokal Stuttgart	3rd place, bronze medalist(s)					
2022	City of Jesolo Trophy		10				
2022	3rd Italian Serie A	2nd place, silver medalist(s)					
2022	World Championships	5					
2023	1st Italian Serie A	2nd place, silver medalist(s)					
2023	Cottbus World Cup			1st place, gold medalist(s)			2nd place, silver medalist(s)
2023	2nd Italian Serie A	2nd place, silver medalist(s)					
2023	City of Jesolo Trophy	1st place, gold medalist(s)	1st place, gold medalist(s)	3rd place, bronze medalist(s)			
2023	European Championships	2nd place, silver medalist(s)	12			2nd place, silver medalist(s)	
2023	National Championships		2nd place, silver medalist(s)		4	1st place, gold medalist(s)	
2023	World Championships	5	9				
2023	Swiss Cup	4					
2024	City of Jesolo Trophy	1st place, gold medalist(s)	5				3rd place, bronze medalist(s)
2024	European Championships	1st place, gold medalist(s)	1st place, gold medalist(s)			1st place, gold medalist(s)	1st place, gold medalist(s)
2024	Italian Championships		2nd place, silver medalist(s)			3rd place, bronze medalist(s)	2nd place, silver medalist(s)
2024	Olympic Games	2nd place, silver medalist(s)	14			3rd place, bronze medalist(s)	9
2025	City of Jesolo Trophy	1st place, gold medalist(s)	1st place, gold medalist(s)			1st place, gold medalist(s)	4
2025	European Championships	1st place, gold medalist(s)	1st place, gold medalist(s)		9	7	2nd place, silver medalist(s)
2025	European Championships Mixed Team	3rd place, bronze medalist(s)	—N/a				
2026	Osijek World Cup					1st place, gold medalist(s)	
2026	European Championships	2nd place, silver medalist(s)				2nd place, silver medalist(s)	1st place, gold medalist(s)
2026	World Championships	7				5	R1
