= Elena Colas =

French artistic gymnast (born 2010)

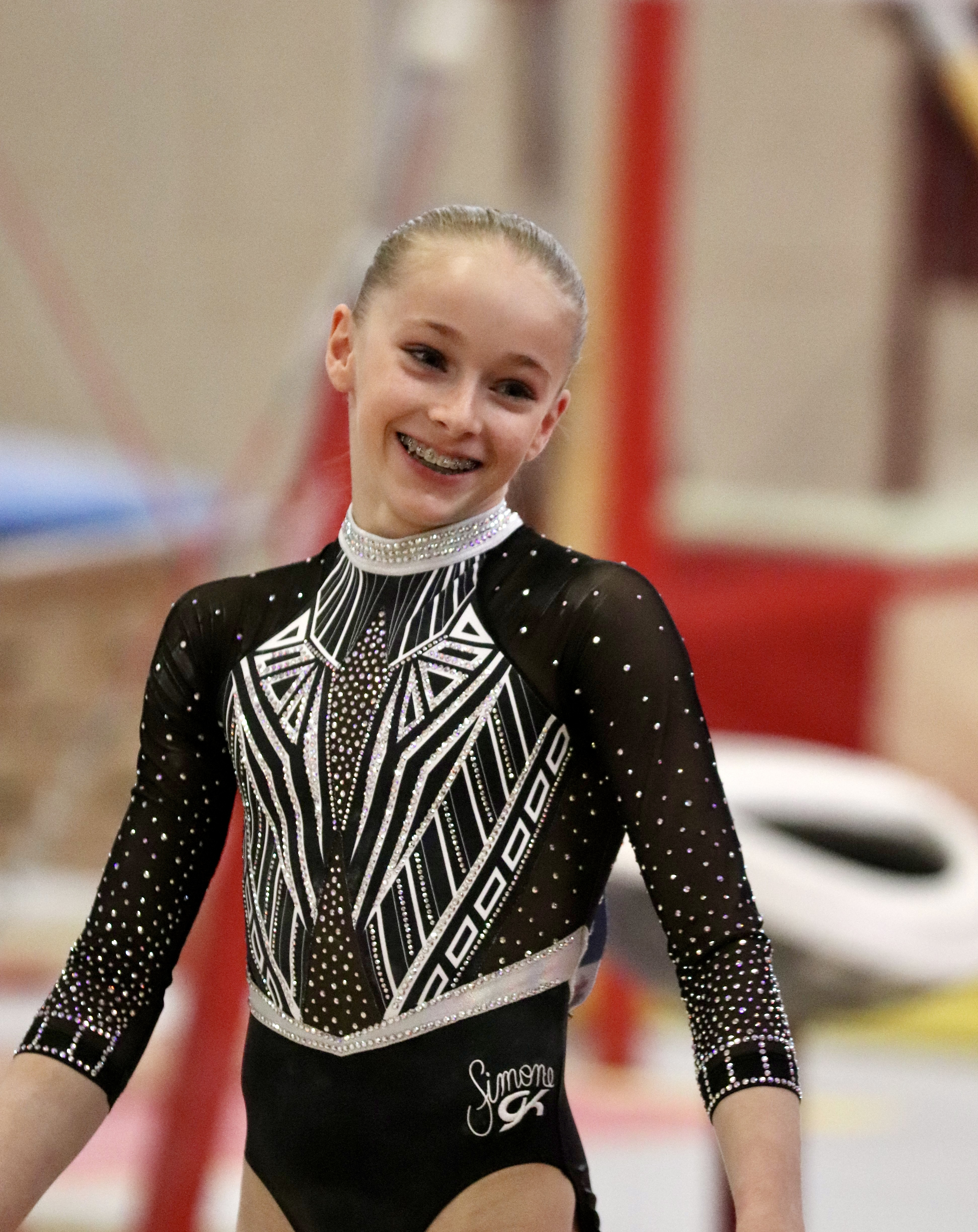
- Colas in 2023

Personal information
- Born: 1 May 2010 (age 16) Chambray-lès-Tours, France

Gymnastics career
- Discipline: Women's artistic gymnastics
- Country represented: France; (2021–present)
- Club: Avoine-Beaumont
- Head coaches: Marc and Gina Chirilcenco
Medal record
Representing France
European Championships
Gold medal – first place	2026 Zagreb	Balance beam
Silver medal – second place	2026 Zagreb	Floor exercise
Bronze medal – third place	2026 Zagreb	Team
Bronze medal – third place	2026 Zagreb	All-around
Junior World Championships
Gold medal – first place	2025 Manila	Team
Silver medal – second place	2025 Manila	All-around
Silver medal – second place	2025 Manila	Floor exercise
FIG World Cup
Event	1st	2nd	3rd
World Cup	1	2	0
World Challenge Cup	1	0	0
Total	2	2	0

Elena Colas (born 1 May 2010) is a French artistic gymnast. She was part of the gold medal winning team at the 2025 Junior World Championships where she also won silver in the all-around and on floor exercise. She is the 2024 Junior European all-around, uneven bars, and team champion, as well as the 2026 European balance beam champion.

== Junior gymnastics career ==
Colas began gymnastics at three years old at the club Avoine-Beaumont because her mother was a coach there.

=== 2021–2023: Espoir ===
Colas won the all-around title at the 2021 French Championships in the 11-year-old category, standing out for her high level of difficulty for her age. She made her international debut at the 2021 Swiss Cup Juniors. She placed fifth in the all-around and helped the French team win the bronze medal behind Germany and Belgium. She won the all-around in the espoir division at the 2021 Tournoi International and the Avoine club won the team title. In the event finals, she won the gold medal on the balance beam, the silver medal on the uneven bars, and the bronze medals on the vault and floor exercise.

Colas won the all-around title in the espoir division at the 2022 Elek Matolay Memorial. She then won gold medals on the vault and balance beam in the event finals. She helped Avoine-Beaumont win the Top 12 Finals by winning all four events. Then at the French Championships, she won the all-around title in the 12-year-old division by more than 13 points. At the 2022 Tournoi International, she won six medals- gold in the all-around, vault, uneven bars, and balance beam, and silver in the team and floor exercise.

At the 2023 Top 12 Finals, Colas helped Avoine-Beaumont win its third consecutive title. She then won her third consecutive French national all-around title, this time in the 13-year-old division.

=== 2024–2025: Junior ===
Colas had the highest all-around score in the European Championships selection meet, and she was named to the French junior team. Before the European Championships, she competed at the Magglingen Junior Friendly where she won the all-around gold medal and helped the French team win the gold medal by nearly 10 points.

Two days after her 14th birthday, Colas led the French team to a gold medal at the 2024 Junior European Championships, and she won the individual all-around title. Then in the event finals, she tied with Italy's Giulia Perotti for the gold medal on the uneven bars, and she won the bronze medal on the vault.

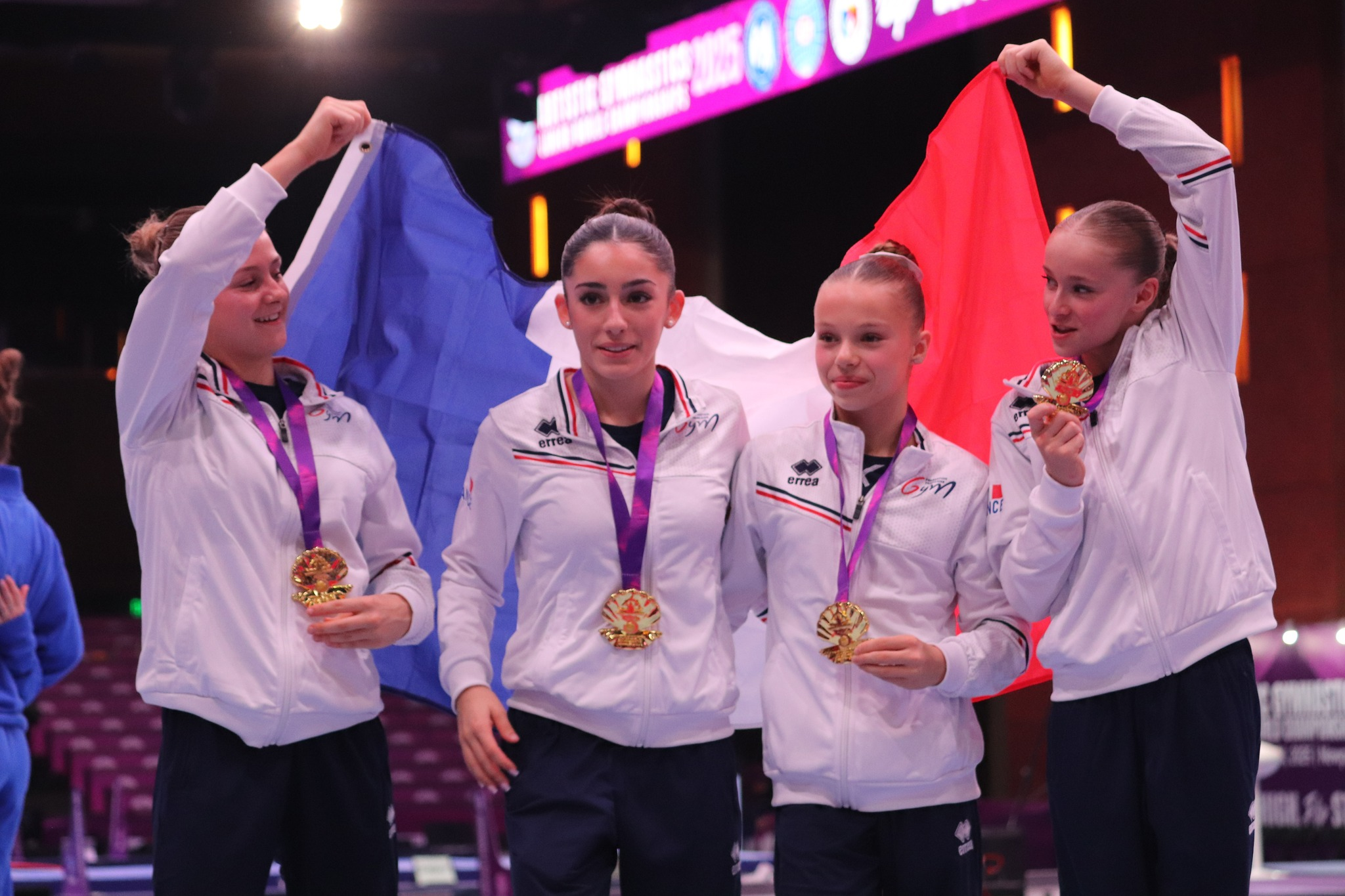
Colas (right) and Team France at the 2025 Junior World Championships

At the 2025 European Youth Olympic Festival, Colas helped France win gold as a team. Additionally she won gold in the all-around and on the uneven bars and balance beam and won silver on floor exercise behind teammate Maïana Prat.

Colas competed at the 2025 Junior World Championships alongside Lola Chassat and Prat. As a team they won gold, earning France its first Junior World Championships team medal. Individually Colas qualified to all five individual finals, leading the all-around qualification with a score of 55.766, which was 0.7 higher than what the 2025 Senior World Champion, Angelina Melnikova, scored to win the title. Despite this huge score, during the all-around final Colas suffered numerous mishaps and scored 53.298 to win the silver medal behind Yume Minamino of Japan. During apparatus finals Colas finished fifth on vault, fourth on uneven bars, and eighth on balance beam before ending the competition winning silver on floor exercise behind Misa Nishiyama of Japan. In winning one gold and two silver medals, Colas tied Minamino as the second most decorated female athlete at the competition, behind Nishiyama who won one gold, two silvers, and one bronze.

== Senior gymnastics career ==
=== 2026 ===
Colas became age-eligible for senior level competition in 2026. She competed at the 2026 Osijek World Cup where she won gold on floor exercise and silver on uneven bars and balance beam. At the 2026 French National Championships, Colas won her first senior all-around title.

"I feel good in France and with the French national team in general. I am French, I have no other nationality, so why would I change my nationality when everything is going well for me? [...] after discussing it with my family, I've made my decision. I've always been transparent and said that I would stay in France."

— Colas via L'Équipe

In late June, Colas's coaches, Marc and Gina Chirilcenco, announced that they would be leaving France in order to create a high performance gymnastics team in Qatar. As these negotiations had been going on since October 2025, there had been considerable interest leading up to the announcement in whether Colas would follow them to Qatar or remain representing France. However, Colas asserted her decision to remain a part of the French national team and continue representing France, despite numerous of her club teammates, such as fellow 2025 Junior World Championships teammate Perla Denéchère, choosing to follow their coaches to Qatar.

Colas was selected to compete at the 2026 European Championships alongside Lorette Charpy, Lola Chassat, Morgane Osyssek, and Maïana Prat. On the first day of competition, Colas won bronze in the all-around behind Angelina Melnikova and Anna Kalmykova. During event finals, Colas won gold on balance beam and silver on floor exercise behind Manila Esposito. On the final day of competition, she helped France win team bronze.

In September, Colas competed on uneven bars at the Paris World Challenge Cup. She won the gold medal on the event ahead of Emelie Westlund of Sweden and neutral athlete Sofia Shtykhetskaya. The following month she competed at the 2026 World Championships where she helped the French team finish fourth. Individually she placed sixth in the all-around and fourth on the uneven bars and balance beam.

== Competitive history ==
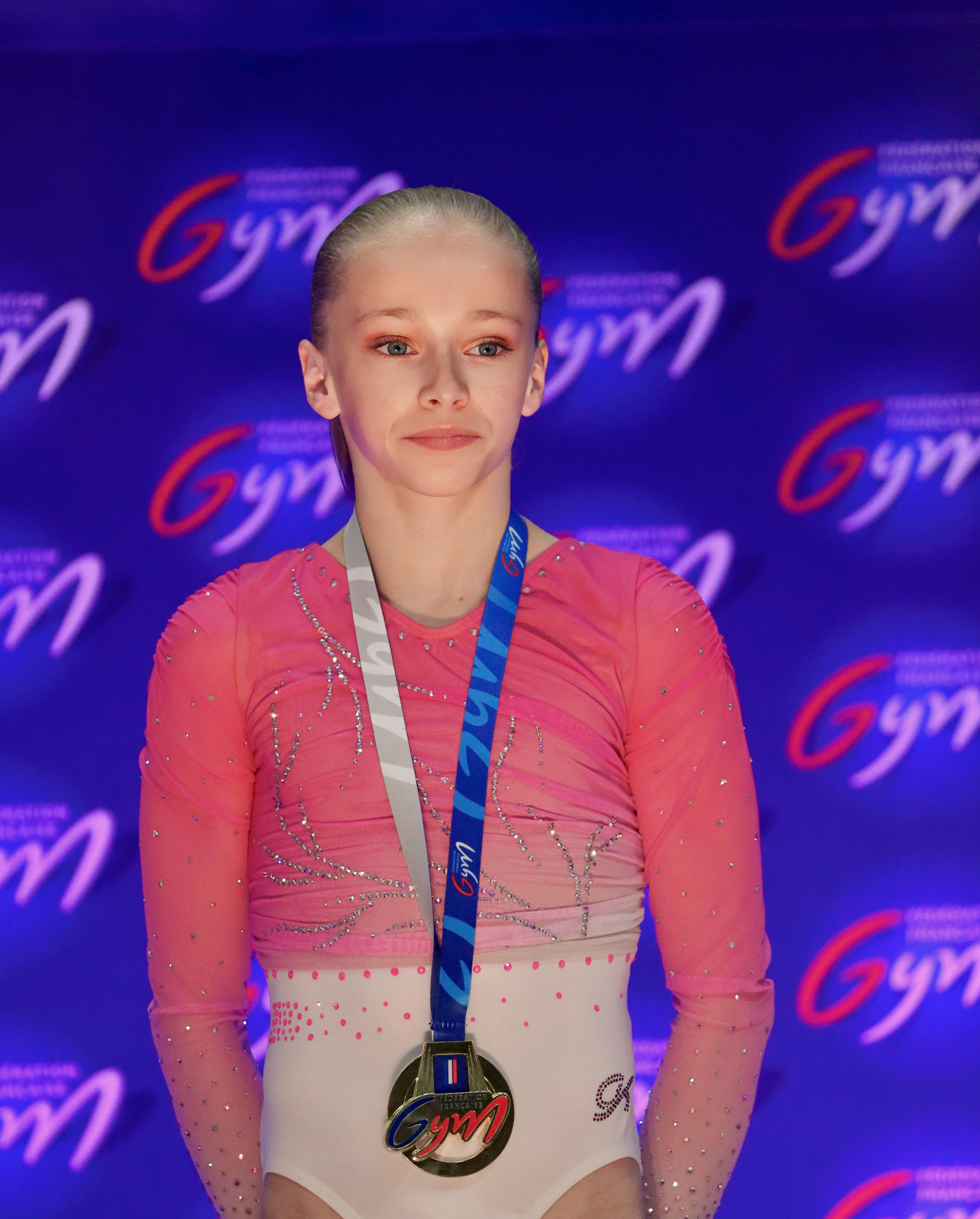
Colas at the 2023 French Championships

=== Junior ===
Competitive history of Elena Colas at the espoir level
Year	Event	Team	AA	VT	UB	BB	FX
2021	Swiss Cup Juniors	3rd place, bronze medalist(s)	5				
2021	Tournoi International	1st place, gold medalist(s)	1st place, gold medalist(s)	3rd place, bronze medalist(s)	2nd place, silver medalist(s)	1st place, gold medalist(s)	3rd place, bronze medalist(s)
2022	Elek Matolay Memorial		1st place, gold medalist(s)	1st place, gold medalist(s)		1st place, gold medalist(s)	
2022	French National Championships		1st place, gold medalist(s)	1st place, gold medalist(s)	1st place, gold medalist(s)	1st place, gold medalist(s)	1st place, gold medalist(s)
2022	Tournoi International	2nd place, silver medalist(s)	1st place, gold medalist(s)	1st place, gold medalist(s)	1st place, gold medalist(s)	1st place, gold medalist(s)	2nd place, silver medalist(s)
2023	French National Championships		1st place, gold medalist(s)	1st place, gold medalist(s)	1st place, gold medalist(s)	1st place, gold medalist(s)	1st place, gold medalist(s)
2023	French National Team Review				1st place, gold medalist(s)		2nd place, silver medalist(s)

Competitive history of Elena Colas at the junior level
Year	Event	Team	AA	VT	UB	BB	FX
2024	Magglingen Junior Friendly	1st place, gold medalist(s)	1st place, gold medalist(s)				
2024	Junior European Championships	1st place, gold medalist(s)	1st place, gold medalist(s)	3rd place, bronze medalist(s)	1st place, gold medalist(s)		4
2024	French National Championships		1st place, gold medalist(s)	2nd place, silver medalist(s)	1st place, gold medalist(s)	4	1st place, gold medalist(s)
2024	French National Team Review		1st place, gold medalist(s)	1st place, gold medalist(s)	1st place, gold medalist(s)	1st place, gold medalist(s)	2nd place, silver medalist(s)
2024	Tournoi International	1st place, gold medalist(s)	1st place, gold medalist(s)		4	1st place, gold medalist(s)	
2025	International Gymnix	1st place, gold medalist(s)	1st place, gold medalist(s)	3rd place, bronze medalist(s)	1st place, gold medalist(s)	1st place, gold medalist(s)	1st place, gold medalist(s)
2025	French National Championships		1st place, gold medalist(s)	1st place, gold medalist(s)	1st place, gold medalist(s)	2nd place, silver medalist(s)	1st place, gold medalist(s)
2025	Sens Junior Friendly	1st place, gold medalist(s)	1st place, gold medalist(s)	1st place, gold medalist(s)	1st place, gold medalist(s)	2nd place, silver medalist(s)	1st place, gold medalist(s)
2025	European Youth Olympic Festival	1st place, gold medalist(s)	1st place, gold medalist(s)		1st place, gold medalist(s)	1st place, gold medalist(s)	2nd place, silver medalist(s)
2025	Junior World Championships	1st place, gold medalist(s)	2nd place, silver medalist(s)	5	4	8	2nd place, silver medalist(s)

=== Senior ===
Competitive history of Elena Colas at the senior level
Year	Event	Team	AA	VT	UB	BB	FX
2026	City of Jesolo Trophy	2nd place, silver medalist(s)	1st place, gold medalist(s)		1st place, gold medalist(s)	6	
2026	Osijek World Cup				2nd place, silver medalist(s)	2nd place, silver medalist(s)	1st place, gold medalist(s)
2026	French National Championships		1st place, gold medalist(s)		1st place, gold medalist(s)	5	1st place, gold medalist(s)
2026	European Championships	3rd place, bronze medalist(s)	3rd place, bronze medalist(s)			1st place, gold medalist(s)	2nd place, silver medalist(s)
2026	Paris World Challenge Cup				1st place, gold medalist(s)		
2026	World Championships	4	6		4	4	
