= Maïana Prat =

French artistic gymnast

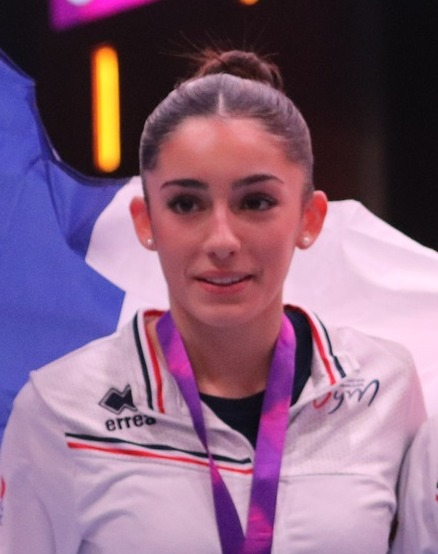
- Prat at the 2025 Junior World Championships

Personal information
- Born: 11 April 2010 (age 16) Bordeaux, France

Gymnastics career
- Discipline: Women's artistic gymnastics
- Country represented: France; (2023–present)
- Club: SA Mérignac Gymnastique
- Head coach: Mickael Pallares
Medal record
Representing France
World Championships
Bronze medal – third place	2026 Rotterdam	Floor exercise
European Championships
Bronze medal – third place	2026 Zagreb	Team
Junior World Championships
Gold medal – first place	2025 Manila	Team
Bronze medal – third place	2025 Manila	Floor exercise
FIG World Cup
Event	1st	2nd	3rd
World Championship	0	0	1
Apparatus World Cup	0	1	0
World Challenge Cup	1	0	0
Total	1	1	1

Maïana Prat (born April 11, 2010) is a French artistic gymnast. She is the 2026 World bronze medalist on floor exercise. She was also the bronze medalist on floor at the 2025 Junior World Championships, in addition to winning gold with the French team.

== Career ==
=== 2022–2023 ===
Prat made her international debut at the 2023 Swiss Cup Juniors where she placed first in the all-around and helped the French team place second. In November 2023, Prat won the all-around gold medal at the Tournoi International in Combs-la-Ville. She also won the balance beam and the floor exercise gold medals and the uneven bars bronze medal. She competed at the Top Gym in Charleroi where she won the floor exercise gold medal.

=== 2024–2025 ===
In early 2024, Prat competed with the French Team at the Magglingen Junior Friendly where she won the all-around bronze medal behind her teammates Elena Colas and Perla Denéchère. She also won gold on floor exercise and bronze on balance beam at the 2024 DTB Pokal Team Challenge, after winning the team gold medal with her teammates. At the 2024 Junior European Championships, Prat helped France win the junior team title. Individually she won bronze in the all-around behind teammate Colas and Giulia Perotti of Italy and she won gold on balance beam.

At the 2025 European Youth Olympic Festival, Prat helped France win gold as a team. Individually she won gold on floor exercise.

Prat competed at the 2025 Junior World Championships alongside Lola Chassat and Elena Colas. As a team they won gold, earning France its first Junior World Championships team medal. Individually Prat qualified to the all-around and floor exercise finals. She finished seventh in the all-around and won bronze on floor exercise behind Misa Nishiyama of Japan and teammate Colas.

=== 2026 ===
Prat became age-eligible for senior level competition in 2026. She made her international debut at the 2026 City of Jesolo Trophy where she helped the French team win silver and individually she won gold on balance beam and silver on floor exercise behind Reese Esponda. She next competed at the Osijek World Cup where she won silver on floor exercise.

Prat was selected to compete at the 2026 European Championships alongside Lorette Charpy, Lola Chassat, Elena Colas, and Morgane Osyssek. Prat finished fourteenth in the all-around and sixth on floor exercise. During the team final, she helped France win bronze.

At the 2026 World Championships, Prat helped France finish fourth as a team. Individually she finished seventeenth in the all-around before going on to win bronze on floor exercise behind Claire Pease and Reese Esponda. In doing so, she became the third French female artistic gymnast to win a World medal on floor exercise after Ludivine Furnon and Cassy Vericel, both of whom also won bronze.

== Eponymous skill ==
Prat has one skill named after her in the Code of Points.

Apparatus	Name	Description	Difficulty (Note: Valid for the 2025–2028 Code of Points)	Added to the Code of Points
Floor exercise	Prat	Split ring leap with 360 degree turn	E (0.5)	2025 European Youth Olympic Festival

== Competitive history ==
Competitive history of Maïana Prat at the junior level
Year	Event	Team	AA	VT	UB	BB	FX
2022	French Championships		4	3rd place, bronze medalist(s)		3rd place, bronze medalist(s)	
2023	French Championships		3rd place, bronze medalist(s)			3rd place, bronze medalist(s)	3rd place, bronze medalist(s)
2023	French National Team Review		2nd place, silver medalist(s)			2nd place, silver medalist(s)	1st place, gold medalist(s)
2023	Swiss Cup Juniors	1st place, gold medalist(s)	1st place, gold medalist(s)				
2023	Tournoi International	4	1st place, gold medalist(s)		3rd place, bronze medalist(s)	1st place, gold medalist(s)	1st place, gold medalist(s)
2023	Top Gym Tournament		8		10		1st place, gold medalist(s)
2024	DTB Pokal Team Challenge	1st place, gold medalist(s)				3rd place, bronze medalist(s)	1st place, gold medalist(s)
2024	Magglingen Junior Friendly	1st place, gold medalist(s)	3rd place, bronze medalist(s)				
2024	Junior European Championships	1st place, gold medalist(s)	3rd place, bronze medalist(s)			1st place, gold medalist(s)	
2024	French Championships		2nd place, silver medalist(s)	5	4	1st place, gold medalist(s)	2nd place, silver medalist(s)
2024	French National Team Review		2nd place, silver medalist(s)				
2024	Tournoi International	1st place, gold medalist(s)	9	4			5
2025	International Gymnix	1st place, gold medalist(s)	4	4		2nd place, silver medalist(s)	2nd place, silver medalist(s)
2025	French Championships		2nd place, silver medalist(s)	4	3rd place, bronze medalist(s)	1st place, gold medalist(s)	2nd place, silver medalist(s)
2025	Sens Junior Friendly	1st place, gold medalist(s)	3rd place, bronze medalist(s)				
2025	European Youth Olympic Festival	1st place, gold medalist(s)					1st place, gold medalist(s)
2025	French National Team Review		3rd place, bronze medalist(s)				
2025	Tournoi International	1st place, gold medalist(s)	2nd place, silver medalist(s)			1st place, gold medalist(s)	2nd place, silver medalist(s)
2025	Junior World Championships	1st place, gold medalist(s)	7				3rd place, bronze medalist(s)

Prat at the 2026 Paris World Challenge Cup

Competitive history of Maïana Prat at the senior level
Year	Event	Team	AA	VT	UB	BB	FX
2026	French National Test		2nd place, silver medalist(s)				
2026	City of Jesolo Trophy	2nd place, silver medalist(s)	7			1st place, gold medalist(s)	2nd place, silver medalist(s)
2026	Osijek World Cup						2nd place, silver medalist(s)
2026	French National Championships		2nd place, silver medalist(s)	4	5	1st place, gold medalist(s)	2nd place, silver medalist(s)
2026	European Championships	3rd place, bronze medalist(s)	14				6
2026	Paris World Challenge Cup						1st place, gold medalist(s)
2026	World Championships	4	17			R2	3rd place, bronze medalist(s)
