= Lola Chassat =

French artistic gymnast

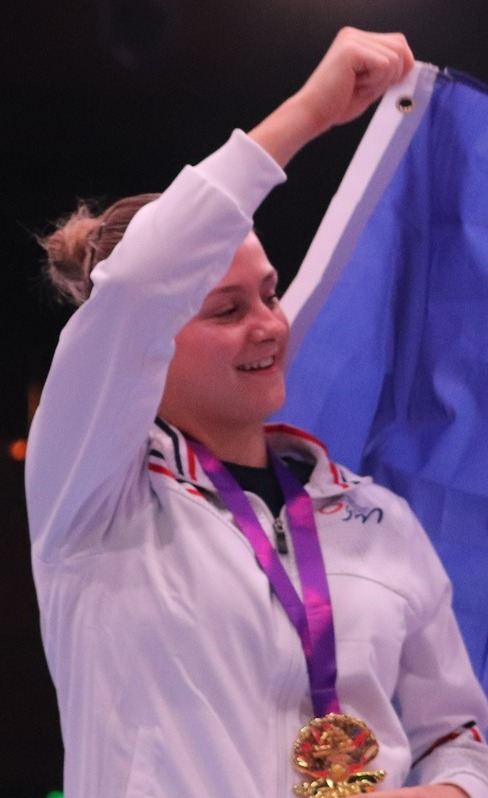
- Chassat at the 2025 Junior World Championships

Personal information
- Born: 12 April 2010 (age 16) Beaumont, Puy-de-Dôme, France

Gymnastics career
- Discipline: Women's artistic gymnastics
- Country represented: France (2022–present)
- Club: Cournon d’Auvergne
- Gym: Pôle Gym St-Etienne
- Head coaches: Monique Hagard, Julien Kerninon, Marie Angeline Colson
- Former coaches: Vincent Guerillon; Eleonora Ratti
Medal record
Representing France
European Championships
Bronze medal – third place	2026 Zagreb	Team
Junior World Championships
Gold medal – first place	2025 Manila	Team

Lola Chassat (born April 12, 2010) is a French artistic gymnast. She was part of gold medal winning teams at the 2025 Junior World Championships and the 2024 Junior European Championships. At the latter she also won bronze on the uneven bars.

== Early life ==
Chassat was born in Beaumont, France in 2010.

== Gymnastics career ==
=== 2022–2023: Espoir ===
Chassat competed at the 2022 Elek Matolay Memorial where she placed third in the all-around and won gold on the uneven bars and floor exercise. At the 2022 French National Championships, she placed second in the espoir division. At the Essen Junior Friendly, she helped France win team gold and individually she placed second in the all-around.

At the 2023 French National Championships, Chassat once again won silver in the espoir division.

=== 2024–2025: Junior ===
In early 2024, Chassat competed at the DTB Pokal Team Challenge where she helped France win team gold. Individually she won gold on the uneven bars. She next competed at the Magglingen Junior Friendly where she placed twelfth in the all-around and helped the French team win the gold medal by nearly 10 points. At the 2024 Junior European Championships, Chassat helped France win team gold. Individually she won bronze on the uneven bars co-winners Giulia Perotti and Elena Colas. At the 2024 French National Championships, she placed seventh in the all-around, second on balance beam, and fifth on floor exercise.

Chassat began 2025 competing at International Gymnix where she helped the French team win gold. At the French National Championships she won bronze in the all-around behind Colas and Maïana Prat. Together that trio competed at the 2025 European Youth Olympic Festival where they won team gold. Individually Chassat won bronze on the uneven bars and silver on balance beam. Chassat was selected to represent France at the 2025 Junior World Championships alongside Colas and Prat. As a team they won gold, earning France its first Junior World Championships team medal. Individually Chassat qualified to the uneven bars final where she finished fifth.

=== Senior: 2026–present ===
Chassat became age-eligible for senior level competition in 2026. She made her international debut at the 2026 City of Jesolo Trophy where she helped the French team win silver. At the 2026 French National Championships, she placed third in the all-around behind Colas and Prat.

Chassat was selected to compete at the 2026 European Championships alongside Lorette Charpy, Colas, Morgane Osyssek, and Prat. Together they won bronze as a team.

== Competitive history ==
Competitive history of Lola Chassat at the junior level
Year	Event	Team	AA	VT	UB	BB	FX
2021	Tournoi International	7	6		6	5	6
2022	French Test Meet		3rd place, bronze medalist(s)				
2022	Elek Matolay Memorial		3rd place, bronze medalist(s)		1st place, gold medalist(s)		1st place, gold medalist(s)
2022	French National Championships		2nd place, silver medalist(s)				
2022	Essen Junior Friendly	1st place, gold medalist(s)	2nd place, silver medalist(s)				
2022	Tournoi International	3rd place, bronze medalist(s)			3rd place, bronze medalist(s)	6	
2023	French National Championships		2nd place, silver medalist(s)				
2023	Tournoi International	6	7		1st place, gold medalist(s)		2nd place, silver medalist(s)
2024	DTB Pokal Team Challenge	1st place, gold medalist(s)			1st place, gold medalist(s)		
2024	Magglingen Junior Friendly	1st place, gold medalist(s)	12				
2024	Junior European Championships	1st place, gold medalist(s)			3rd place, bronze medalist(s)		
2024	French National Championships		7			2nd place, silver medalist(s)	5
2024	French National Team Review		3rd place, bronze medalist(s)				
2024	Tournoi International	1st place, gold medalist(s)	6				
2025	International Gymnix	1st place, gold medalist(s)			6		
2025	French National Championships		3rd place, bronze medalist(s)	3rd place, bronze medalist(s)	2nd place, silver medalist(s)	3rd place, bronze medalist(s)	3rd place, bronze medalist(s)
2025	Sens Junior Friendly	1st place, gold medalist(s)	2nd place, silver medalist(s)				
2025	European Youth Olympic Festival	1st place, gold medalist(s)			3rd place, bronze medalist(s)	2nd place, silver medalist(s)	
2025	French National Team Review		3rd place, bronze medalist(s)				
2025	Tournoi International	1st place, gold medalist(s)	3rd place, bronze medalist(s)		2nd place, silver medalist(s)	2nd place, silver medalist(s)	
2025	Junior World Championships	1st place, gold medalist(s)			5		

Competitive history of Lola Chassat at the senior level
Year	Event	Team	AA	VT	UB	BB	FX
2026	City of Jesolo Trophy	2nd place, silver medalist(s)					
2026	French National Championships		3rd place, bronze medalist(s)		2nd place, silver medalist(s)	6	5
2026	European Championships	3rd place, bronze medalist(s)					
