= Giulia Perotti =

Italian artistic gymnast

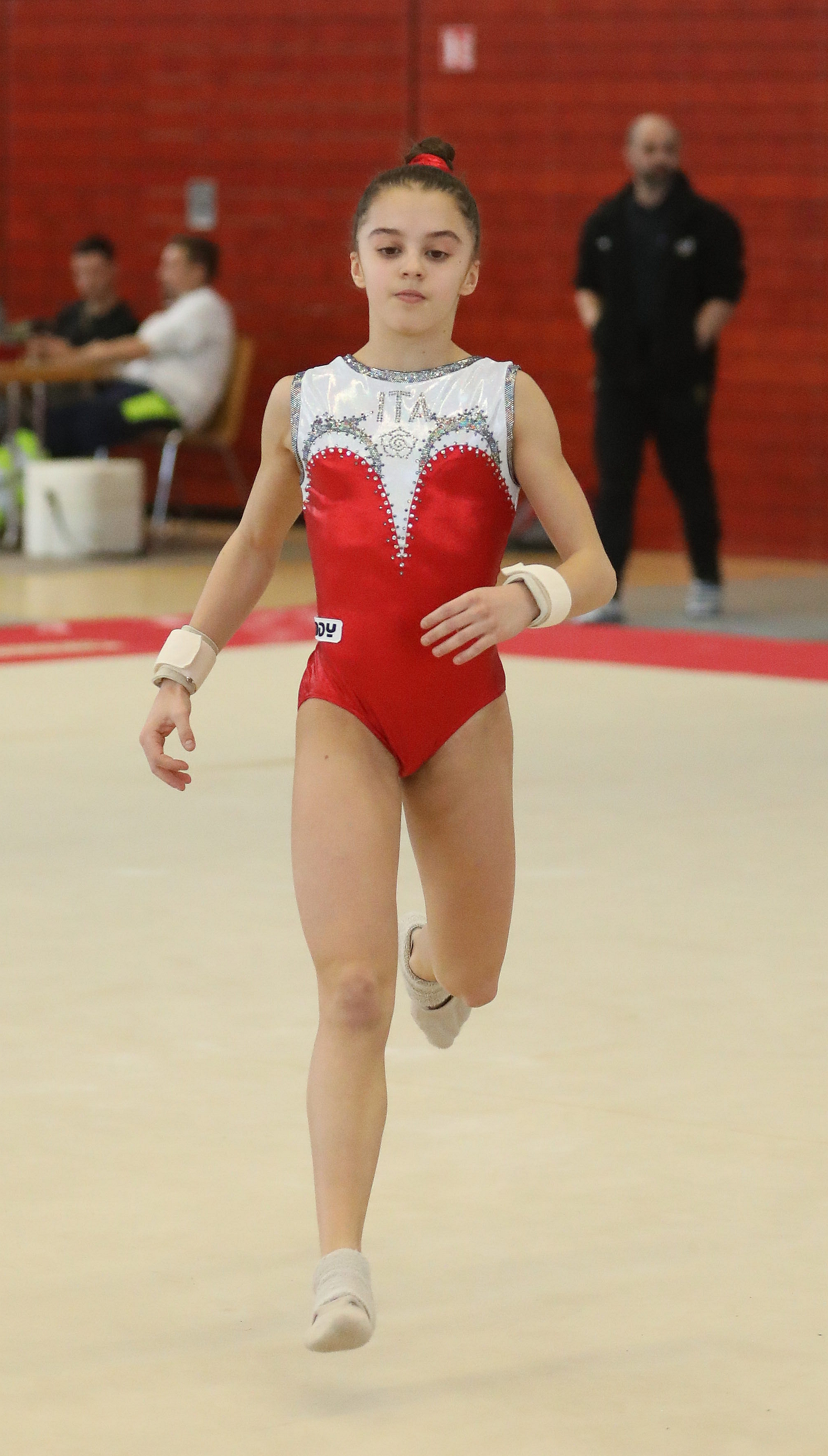
- Perotti at the 2023 Luxembourg Open

Personal information
- Born: 29 August 2009 (age 17) Vercelli, Italy

Gymnastics career
- Discipline: Women's artistic gymnastics
- Country represented: Italy; (2022–present)
- Club: Libertas Ginnastica Vercelli
- Head coaches: Federica Gatti, Enrico Pozzo
Medal record
Representing Italy
European Championships
Gold medal – first place	2025 Leipzig	Team
Silver medal – second place	2026 Zagreb	Team
Bronze medal – third place	2026 Zagreb	Uneven bars
Junior World Championships
Gold medal – first place	2023 Antalya	Floor exercise
Bronze medal – third place	2023 Antalya	Team
Bronze medal – third place	2023 Antalya	Uneven bars
FIG World Cup
Event / 1st / 2nd / 3rd; Apparatus World Cup / 0 / 0 / 1

Giulia Perotti (born 29 August 2009) is an Italian artistic gymnast. She is the 2023 Junior World floor exercise champion and uneven bars and team bronze medalist. She is the 2024 Junior European uneven bars and floor exercise champion.

== Junior gymnastics career ==
Perotti began gymnastics when she was five years old.

=== 2022 ===
Perotti made her international debut at the 2022 Tournoi International in Combs-la-Ville, France. She won the gold medal in the all-around by over a point ahead of the silver medalist. In the event finals, she won the gold medals on the uneven bars and balance beam, and she finished fifth on the floor exercise. Additionally, the Italian team won the gold medal. Then at the 2022 Italian Gold Championships, she won the gold medal in the all-around and the bronze medals on the balance beam and floor exercise.

=== 2023 ===
Perotti began the 2023 season at the 1st Italian Serie A, winning the gold medal in the all-around and the silver medal with the team in the A2 division. She then competed at the Luxembourg Open and won the all-around and team gold medals. In the event finals, she won the gold medal on the balance beam and placed fourth on the floor exercise. Giulia was then selected to compete at the 2023 Junior World Championships alongside Caterina Gaddi and July Marano. The team won the bronze medal and finished only two-tenths of a point behind the silver medalists from the United States. In the all-around final, she finished in seventh place with a total score of 49.932. She then won the bronze medal in the uneven bars final behind teammate Gaddi and Germany's Helen Kevric. In the balance beam final, she finished eighth. Then in the floor exercise, she won the gold medal ahead of Hezly Rivera and Haruka Nakamura with a score of 12.900.

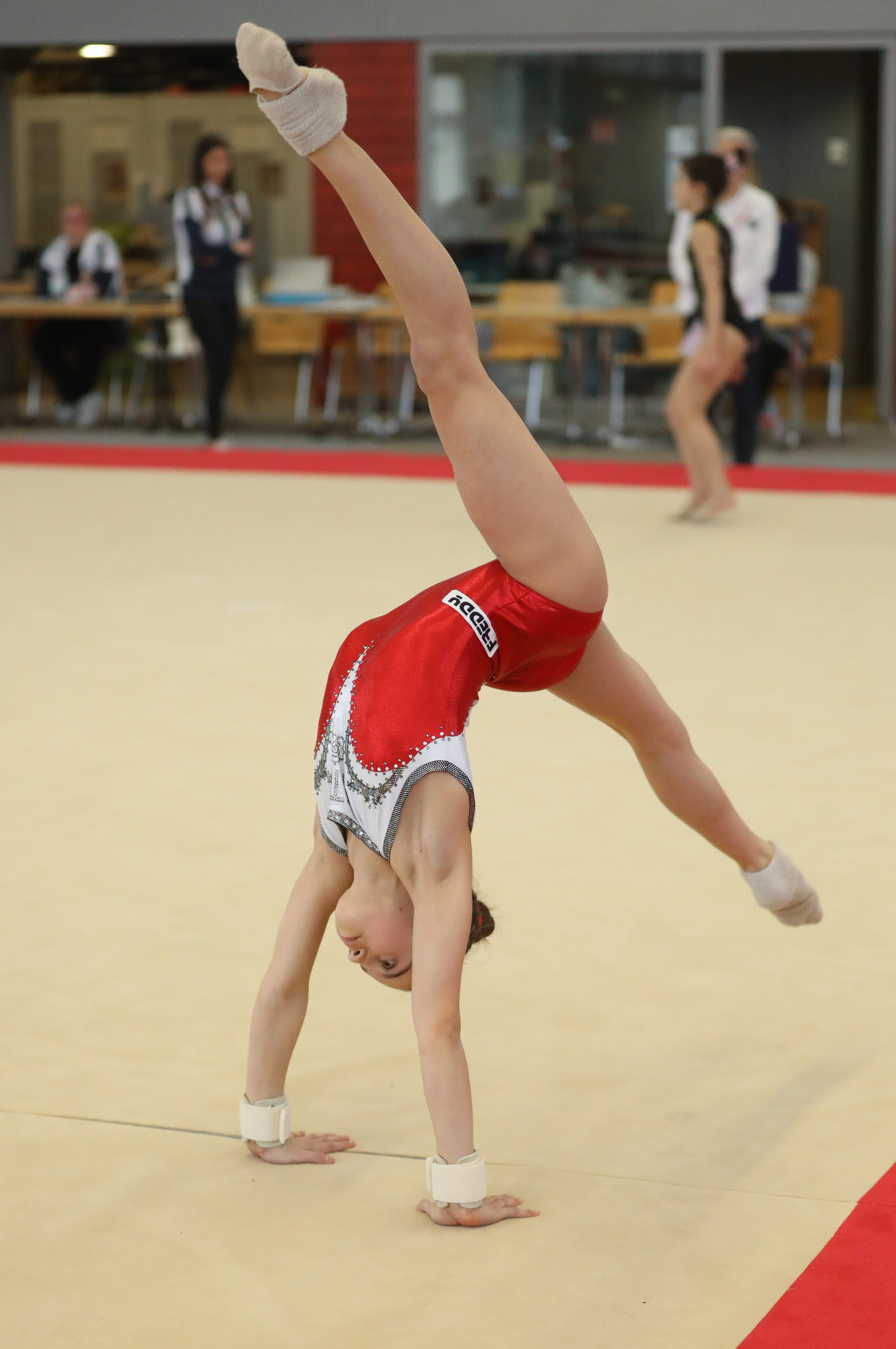
Training

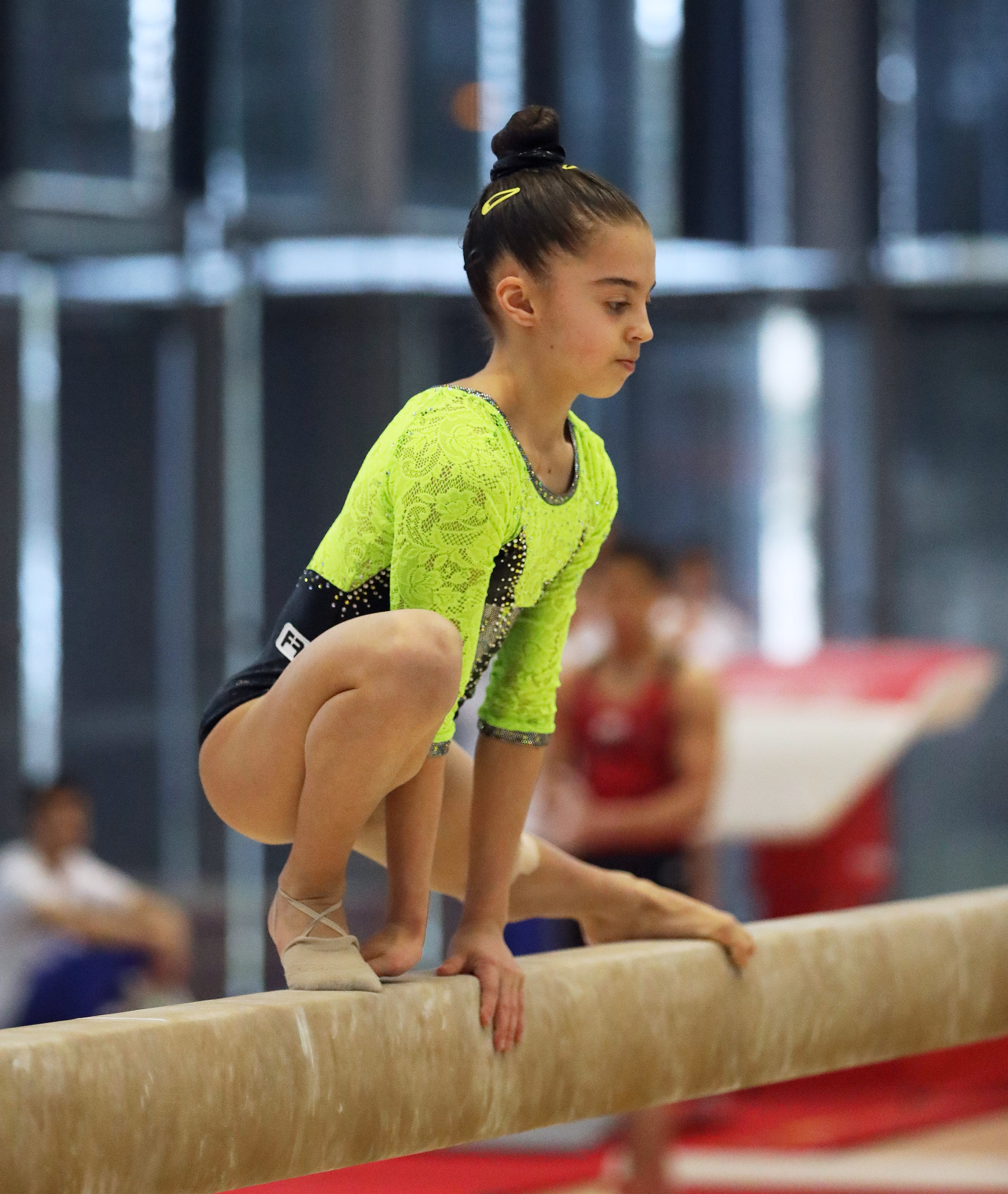
Balance beam

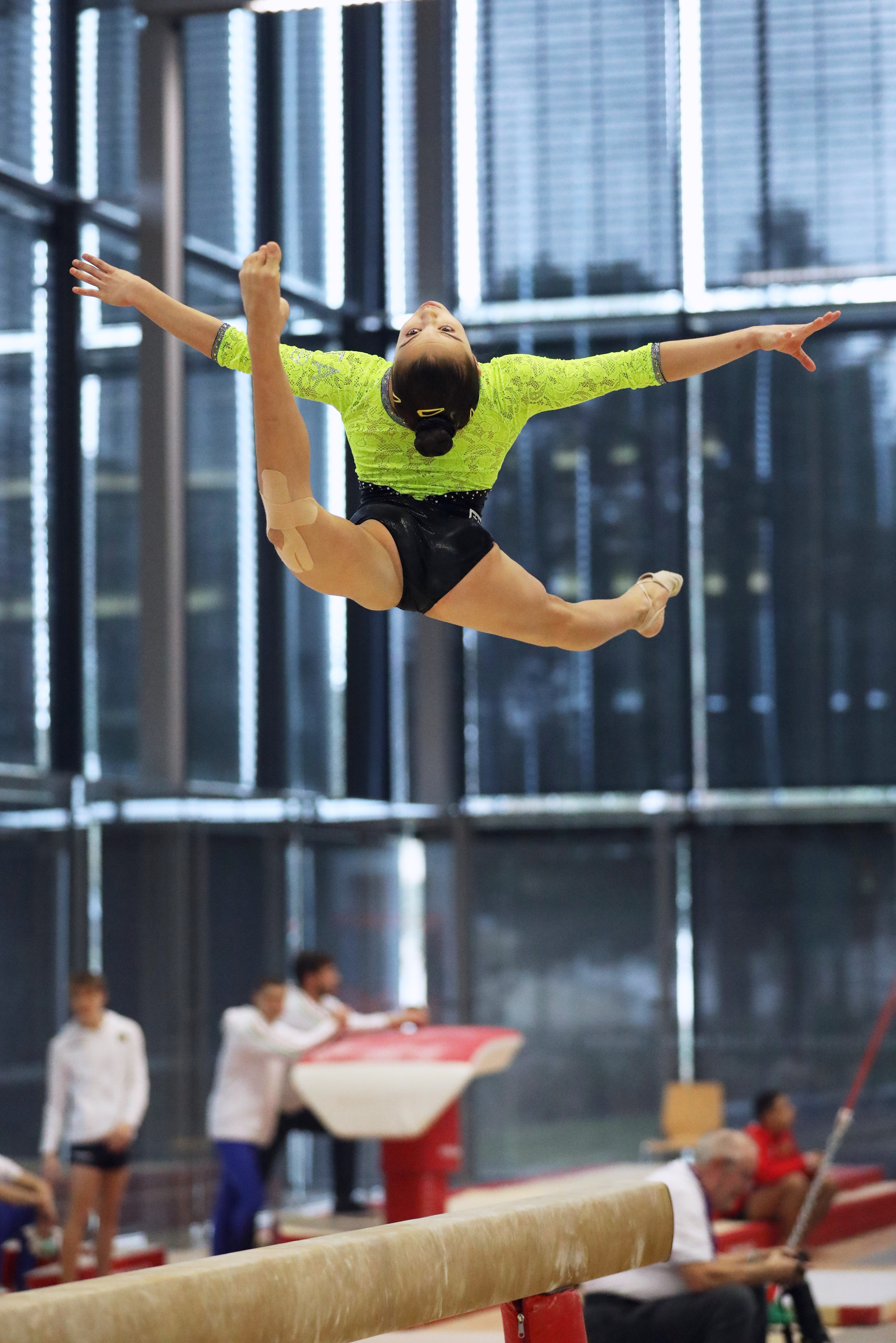
Balance beam

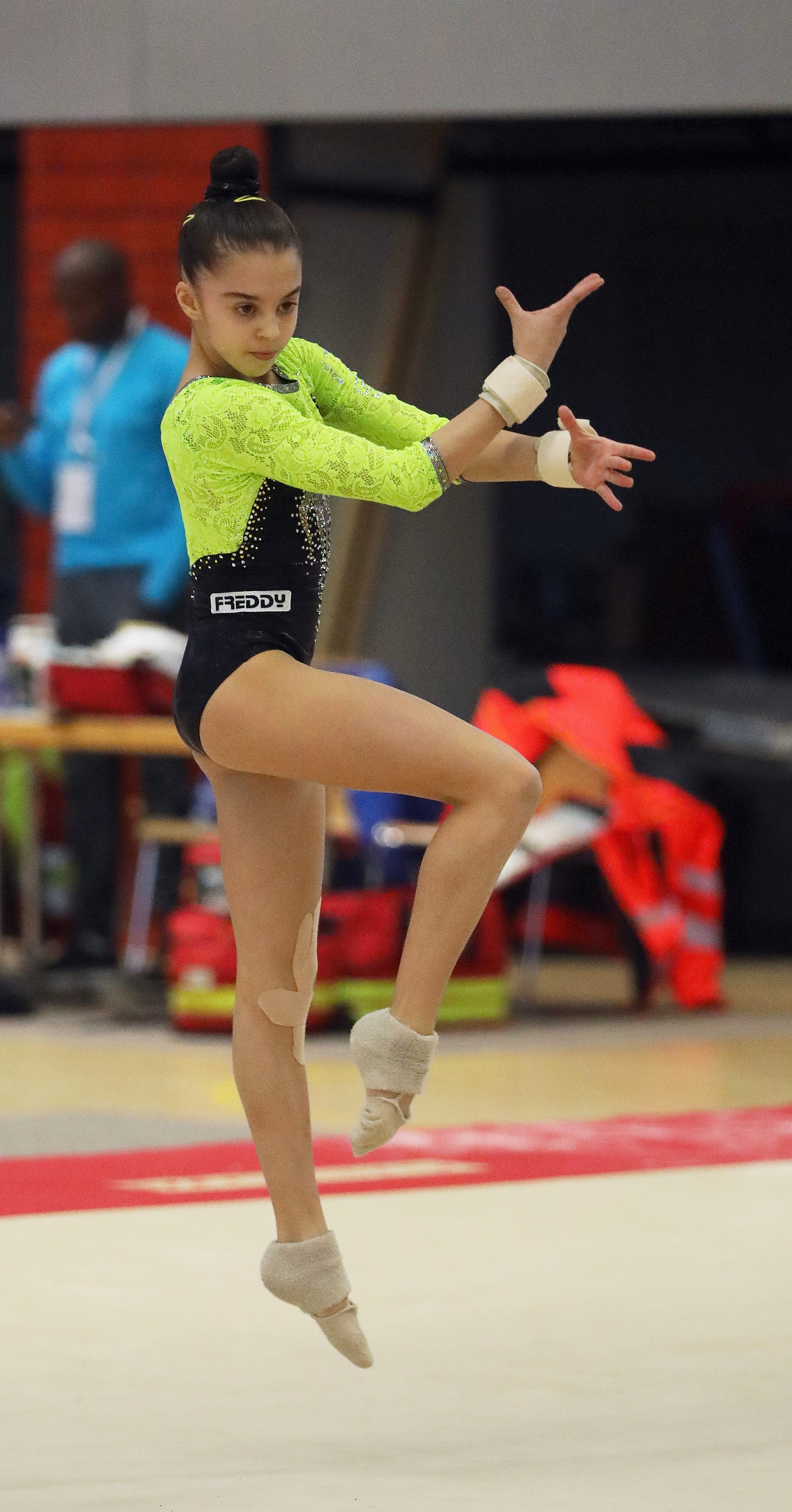
Floor exercise

Perotti at the 2023 Luxembourg Open

== Senior gymnastics career ==
=== 2025 ===
Perotti became age-eligible for senior level competition in 2025. She was selected to compete at the 2025 European Championships alongside Manila Esposito, Alice D'Amato, Emma Fioravanti, and Sofia Tonelli. While there she helped Italy win gold as a team.

In October, Perotti represented Italy at the 2025 World Gymnastics Championships with teammates Emma Fioravanti, Asia D'Amato, and Chiara Barsazi. She was a reserve for the all-around final. She also qualified for the floor exercise final, where she ultimately finished in eighth place.

== Competitive history ==
Competitive history of Giulia Perotti at the junior level
Year	Event	Team	AA	VT	UB	BB	FX
2022	Tournoi International	1st place, gold medalist(s)	1st place, gold medalist(s)		1st place, gold medalist(s)	1st place, gold medalist(s)	5
2022	Italian Gold Championships		1st place, gold medalist(s)		6	3rd place, bronze medalist(s)	3rd place, bronze medalist(s)
2023	Luxembourg Open	1st place, gold medalist(s)	1st place, gold medalist(s)			1st place, gold medalist(s)	4
2023	Junior World Championships	3rd place, bronze medalist(s)	7		3rd place, bronze medalist(s)	8	1st place, gold medalist(s)
2024	City of Jesolo Trophy	2nd place, silver medalist(s)	1st place, gold medalist(s)		3rd place, bronze medalist(s)	1st place, gold medalist(s)	2nd place, silver medalist(s)
2024	European Championships	2nd place, silver medalist(s)	2nd place, silver medalist(s)		1st place, gold medalist(s)	3rd place, bronze medalist(s)	1st place, gold medalist(s)

Competitive history of Giulia Perotti at the senior level
Year	Event	Team	AA	VT	UB	BB	FX
2025
2025	European Championships	1st place, gold medalist(s)					
2025	National Championships		1st place, gold medalist(s)		2nd place, silver medalist(s)	1st place, gold medalist(s)	1st place, gold medalist(s)
2025	World Championships	—N/a	R4				8
2026	Cottbus World Cup				3rd place, bronze medalist(s)		
2026	City of Jesolo Trophy	5			5		
2026	European Championships	2nd place, silver medalist(s)	9		3rd place, bronze medalist(s)		
2026	World Championships	7	10		7		
