= Junior World Artistic Gymnastics Championships – Girls' balance beam =

The Junior World Championships in artistic gymnastics were first held in 2019. Originally meant to be held every two years, the second edition of the event was not held until 2023 due to the COVID-19 pandemic.

Three medals are awarded: gold for first place, silver for second place, and bronze for third place. Tie breakers were used in the first year of the event but were not used subsequently.

== Medalists ==
| Year | Location | Gold | Silver | Bronze | Ref |
|---|---|---|---|---|---|
| 2019 | (Hungary) Győr | (Russia) Elena Gerasimova | (China) Wei Xiaoyuan | (United States) Kayla DiCello | |
| 2023 | (Turkey) Antalya | (China) Yu Hanyue | (Romania) Gabriela Vanoaga | (Canada) Cristella Brunetti-Burns | |
| 2025 | (Philippines) Manila | (China) Xiang Yina | (Japan) Yume Minamino | (United States) Caroline Moreau | |

== All-time medal count ==
Last updated after the 2025 Junior World Championships.

| Rank | Nation | Gold | Silver | Bronze | Total |
|---|---|---|---|---|---|
| 1 | China | 2 | 1 | 0 | 3 |
| 2 | Russia | 1 | 0 | 0 | 1 |
| 3 | Japan | 0 | 1 | 0 | 1 |
| 3 | Romania | 0 | 1 | 0 | 1 |
| 5 | United States | 0 | 0 | 2 | 2 |
| 6 | Canada | 0 | 0 | 1 | 1 |
| Totals (6 entries) | | 3 | 3 | 3 | 9 |
