= Junior World Artistic Gymnastics Championships – Girls' uneven bars =

The Junior World Championships in artistic gymnastics were first held in 2019. Originally meant to be held every two years, the second edition of the event was not held until 2023 due to the COVID-19 pandemic.

Three medals are awarded: gold for first place, silver for second place, and bronze for third place. Tie breakers were used in the first year of the event but were not used subsequently.

== Medalists ==
Year	Location	Gold	Silver	Bronze	Ref
2019	(Hungary) Győr	(Russia) Vladislava Urazova	(Russia) Viktoria Listunova	(China) Wei Xiaoyuan	
2023	(Turkey) Antalya	(Italy) Caterina Gaddi	(Germany) Helen Kevric	(Italy) Giulia Perotti	
2025	(Philippines) Manila	(Individual Neutral Athletes) Milana Kaiumova	(Slovakia) Lucia Piliarova	(United States) Caroline Moreau	

== All-time medal count ==
Last updated after the 2025 Junior World Championships.

Rank	Nation	Gold	Silver	Bronze	Total
1	Russia	1	1	0	2
2	Italy	1	0	1	2
–	Individual Neutral Athletes	1	0	0	1
3	Germany	0	1	0	1
3	Slovakia	0	1	0	1
5	China	0	0	1	1
5	United States	0	0	1	1
Totals (6 entries)		3	3	3	9
