= Cristella Brunetti-Burns =

Canadian artistic gymnast

- Born: March 7, 2008 (age 18) Montreal, Quebec

Gymnastics career
- Discipline: Women's artistic gymnastics
- Country represented: Canada (2022–present)
- Gym: West Island Montreal Gymnastics
- Head coach: Claude Pelletier
Medal record
Representing Canada
Junior World Championships
| Bronze medal – third place | 2023 Antalya | Balance beam |

Cristella Brunetti-Burns (born March 7, 2008) is a Canadian artistic gymnast. She is the 2023 Junior World bronze medalist on balance beam.

== Early life ==
Brunetti-Burns was born in Montreal in 2008.

== Junior gymnastics career ==
=== 2022 ===
Brunetti-Burns competed at Elite Canada where she finished fourth in the junior division. She was selected to compete at the Pan American Championships alongside Victoriane Charron, Tegan Shaver, and Evandra Zlobec. As a team they won the silver medal behind the United States. Individually Brunetti-Burns won silver on balance beam behind Tiana Sumanasekera.

=== 2023 ===
Brunetti-Burns competed at Elite Canada where she once again finished fourth. At a USA-Canada friendly competition Brunetti-Burns finished seventh. In late March Brunetti-Burns competed at the Junior World Championships alongside Victoriane Charron and Zoe Tsaprailis; together they finished fourth. Individually Brunetti-Burns won bronze on balance beam behind Yu Hanyue and Gabriela Vănoagă.

== Competitive history ==
| Year | Event | Team | AA | VT | UB | BB | FX |
Junior
| 2022 | Elite Canada | | 4 | | | | |
| 2022 | City of Jesolo Trophy | | 35 | | | 5 | |
| 2022 | Canadian Championships | | 4 | | | | |
| 2022 | Pan American Championships | | 2nd place, silver medalist(s) | | | 2nd place, silver medalist(s) | |
| 2022 | Gymnova Cup | | 3rd place, bronze medalist(s) | | | 5 | |
| 2023 | Elite Canada | | 4 | | | | |
| 2023 | USA-CAN Friendly | | 7 | | | | |
| 2023 | Junior World Championships | 4 | | | | 3rd place, bronze medalist(s) | |
Senior
| 2024 | International Gymnix (Challenge) | | | | | 1st place, gold medalist(s) | 3rd place, bronze medalist(s) |
| 2024 | Canadian Championships | | 21 | | 25 | 19 | 20 |
