= Kieryn Finnell =

American artistic gymnast

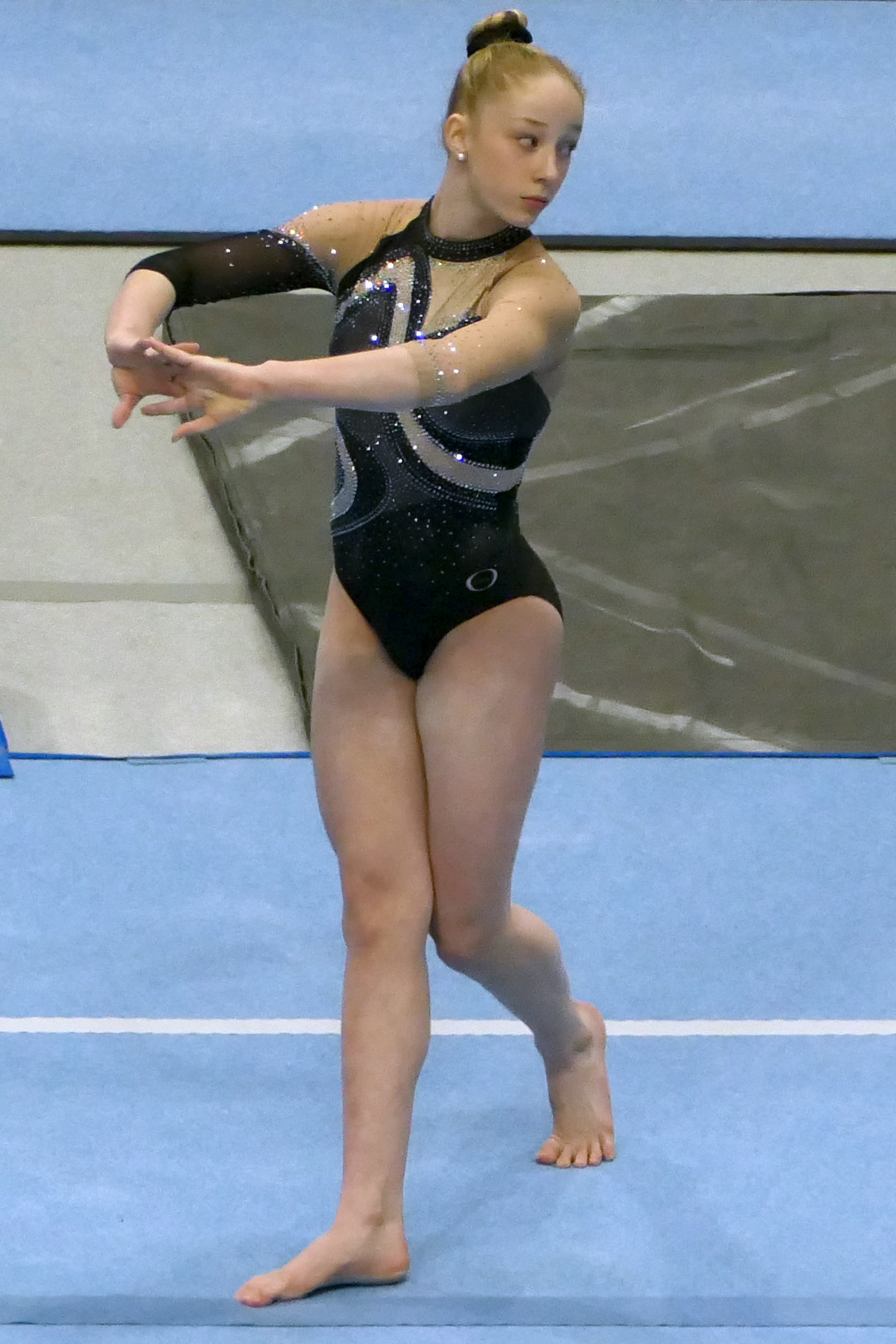
- Finnell at the 2024 U.S. Classic

Personal information
- Born: April 9, 2008 (age 18) Rochester, New York, U.S.
- Height: 5 ft 4 in (163 cm)

Gymnastics career
- Country represented: United States; (2022–2024)
- College team: Florida Gators (2027–2030)
- Club: RGA
- Head coaches: Barry Coss; Youlia Coss
Medal record
Women's artistic gymnastics
Representing United States
Pacific Rim Championships
Gold medal – first place	2024 Cali	Team
Gold medal – first place	2024 Cali	Balance beam
Junior World Championships
Silver medal – second place	2023 Antalya	Team

Kieryn Finnell (born April 9, 2008) is an American artistic gymnast. She was a member of the silver medal-winning team at the 2023 Junior World Championships and is the 2024 Pacific Rim Gymnastics Championships balance beam champion.

== Junior gymnastics career ==
=== 2022 ===
Finnell suffered a hamstring injury two days prior to the 2022 Winter Cup, and missed the competition as a result.

In July she competed at the U.S. Classic where she won gold on uneven bars and placed fourth in the all-around. The following month she competed at the National Championships where she placed eighteenth in the all-around.

=== 2023 ===
Finnell competed at the 2023 Winter Cup where she won silver on balance beam and bronze in the all-around. As a result, she was named to the team to compete at the 2023 Junior World Championships as an alternate. She helped the USA finish second behind Japan.

In August she competed at the 2023 U.S. Classic where she won gold in the all-around and on balance beam, and silver on uneven bars and floor exercise. She then competed at the 2023 National Championships where she won silver in the all-around and on balance beam, bronze on uneven bars, placed sixth on floor exercise, and seventh on vault.

== Senior gymnastics career ==
=== 2024 ===
In April, she made her senior international debut at the 2024 Pacific Rim Gymnastics Championships, alongside Jayla Hang, Madray Johnson and Simone Rose. During the event she won gold in the team event and on balance beam, and placed fourth in the all-around.

In May, she competed at the Core Hydration Classic where she placed twenty-fifth in the all-around. She then competed at the National Championships, and placed nineteenth in the all-around.

=== 2025 ===
On November 12, 2025, she signed with Florida.

== Competitive history ==
Year	Event	Team	AA	VT	UB	BB	FX
Junior
2022	U.S. Classic		4		1st place, gold medalist(s)		
2022	U.S. National Championships		18	13	18	16	18
2023	Winter Cup		3rd place, bronze medalist(s)	6	5	2nd place, silver medalist(s)	12
2023	Junior World Championships	2nd place, silver medalist(s)					
2023	U.S. Classic		1st place, gold medalist(s)	6	2nd place, silver medalist(s)	1st place, gold medalist(s)	2nd place, silver medalist(s)
2023	U.S. National Championships		2nd place, silver medalist(s)	7	3rd place, bronze medalist(s)	2nd place, silver medalist(s)	6
Senior
2024	Pacific Rim Championships	1st place, gold medalist(s)				1st place, gold medalist(s)	
2024	U.S. Classic		25		15	25	25
2024	U.S. National Championships		19		17	12	28
2025	Winter Cup				12		
