= 2022 U.S. Classic =

- Venue: Maverik Center
- Location: West Valley City, Utah
- Dates: July 28–31, 2022

The 2022 U.S. Classic was the 38th edition of the U.S. Classic gymnastics tournament and was held on July 28–31, 2022, at the Maverik Center in West Valley City, Utah. For the first time there was a men's competition in addition to the women's competition.

== Schedule ==
All times are in Mountain Time Zone.

- Hopes Championship – July 28, 2022 at 6:40 PM
- Junior Women's Gymnastics (1) – July 29, 2022 at 7:00 PM
- Junior Women's Gymnastics (2) – July 30, 2022 at 12:30 PM
- Senior Women's Gymnastics – July 30, 2022 at 5:00 PM
- Junior Men's Gymnastics – July 31, 2022 at 12:30 PM
- Senior Men's Gymnastics – July 31, 2022 at 6:30 PM

== Medalists ==
Event	Gold	Silver	Bronze
Senior Women
All-around	Leanne Wong	Shilese Jones	Katelyn Rosen
Vault	Leanne Wong	Joscelyn Roberson	—N/a
Uneven bars	Shilese Jones	Nola Matthews	Charlotte Booth
Balance beam	Leanne Wong	Marissa Neal	Brooke Pierson
Floor	Katelyn Rosen	Shilese Jones	Leanne Wong
Junior Women
All-around	Jayla Hang	Hezly Rivera	Audrey Snyder
Vault	Jayla Hang	Madray Johnson	Christiane Popovich
Uneven bars	Kieryn Finnell Madray Johnson	—N/a	Simone Rose
Balance beam	Hezly Rivera	Audrey Snyder	Simone Rose
Floor	Annalisa Milton	Hezly Rivera	Jayla Hang
Senior Men
All-around	Brody Malone	Colt Walker	Donnell Whittenburg
Floor	Matt Cormier	Donnell Whittenburg	Taylor Burkhart
Pommel horse	Stephen Nedoroscik	Michael Jaroh	Brody Malone
Rings	Donnell Whittenburg	Brody Malone	Riley Loos
Vault	Donnell Whittenburg	Colt Walker	Riley Loos
Parallel bars	Colt Walker	Blake Sun	Brody Malone
Horizontal bar	Brody Malone	Fred Richard	Shane Wiskus

== Participants ==
=== Women ===
==== Senior ====
- Ciena Alipio (Midwest Gymnastics Center)
- Charlotte Booth (Brandy Johnson's Global Gymnastics)
- ~~Adriana Consoli (Pearland Elite)~~
- ~~Kayla DiCello (Hill's Gymnastics)~~
- Amelia Disidore (Great American Gymnastics Express)
- Addison Fatta (Prestige Gymnastics)
- Shilese Jones (Ascend Gymnastics Center)
- ~~Katelyn Jong (Metroplex Gymnastics)~~
- Levi Jung-Ruivivar (Twin City Twisters)
- Lauren Little (Everest Gymnastics)
- Nola Matthews (Airborne Gymnastics Training Center)
- ~~Konnor McClain (WOGA Gymnastics)~~
- Marissa Neal (Great American Gymnastics Express)
- Brooke Pierson (WOGA Gymnastics)
- ~~Camryn Richardson (Pearland Elite)~~
- Joscelyn Roberson (North East Texas Elite Gymnastics)
- Katelyn Rosen (Twin City Twisters)
- Leanne Wong (Great American Gymnastics Express)

==== Junior ====
- ~~Sage Bradford (WOGA Gymnastics)~~
- Payton Chandler (Metroplex Gymnastics)
- Norah Christian (Cascade Elite West)
- Nicole Desmond (First State Gymnastics)
- Anabelle Dewey (E.T.C. Gymnastics)
- Kieryn Finnell (Rochester Gymnastics Academy)
- Jayla Hang (Pacific Reign Gymnastics)
- Gabby Hardie (Twin City Twisters)
- Jazmyn Jimenez (Gymnastics Olympica USA)
- Madray Johnson (WOGA Gymnastics)
- Avery King (WOGA Gymnastics)
- Eveylynn Lowe (Great American Gymnastics Express)
- Taylor McMahon (Texas Dreams Gymnastics)
- Annalisa Milton (Great American Gymnastics Express)
- Malea Milton (Great American Gymnastics Express)
- ~~Ella Kate Parker (Cincinnati Gymnastics)~~
- Claire Pease (WOGA Gymnastics)
- Michelle Pineda (Metroplex Gymnastics)
- Christiane Popovich (Midwest Gymnastics Center)
- Hezly Rivera (WOGA Gymnastics)
- Simone Rose (Pacific Reign Gymnastics)
- Lacie Saltzmann (Texas Dreams Gymnastics)
- Christina Shelton (Top Notch Training Center)
- Audrey Snyder (First State Gymnastics)
- Sydney Snyder (First State Gymnastics)
- Izzy Stassi (Gym X-Treme)
- ~~Tiana Sumanasekera (West Valley Gymnastics School)~~
- Tyler Turner (Airborne Gymnastics Training Center)
- ~~Gabby Van Frayen (Gym X-Treme)~~
- Carly Weinberg (Buckeye Gymnastics)
- Finley Weldon (WOGA Gymnastics)
- Paige Wills (Parkettes National Gymnastics Center)
- Kelise Woolford (Buckeye Gymnastics)

=== Men ===
==== Senior ====
- Justin Ah Chow (Ohio State University)
- Javier Alfonso (University of Michigan)
- Michael Artlip (Penn State University)
- Jeremy Bischoff (Stanford University)
- Landen Blixt (University of Michigan)
- Cameron Bock (University of Michigan)
- Taylor Burkhart (Stanford University)
- Taylor Christopulos (University of Nebraska)
- Zachary Cipra (Northern Illinois University)
- Matt Cormier (Penn State University)
- ~~Tate Costa (University of Illinois)~~
- Aidan Cuy (William and Mary)
- Isaiah Drake (U.S. Naval Academy)
- ~~Zach English (Palmetto Gymnastics Academy)~~
- Will Fleck (Penn State University)
- Colin Flores (West Coast Olympic Gymnastics Academy)
- Tyler Flores (West Coast Olympic Gymnastics Academy)
- Patrick Hoopes (U.S. Air Force Academy)
- Evan Hymanson (Stanford Boys Gymnastics)
- Michael Jaroh (Penn State University)
- Paul Juda (University of Michigan)
- Joshua Karnes (Penn State University)
- Ian Lasic-Ellis (Stanford University)
- Troy Lipis (Gymnastics World)
- Riley Loos (Stanford University)
- Brody Malone (Stanford University)
- Connor McCool (University of Illinois)
- Caleb Melton (Penn State University)
- Izaiha Mlay (West Coast Olympic Gymnastics Academy)
- Yul Moldauer (5280 Gymnastics)
- ~~Logan Myers (University of Illinois)~~
- Stephen Nedoroscik (Penn State University)
- Kameron Nelson (Ohio State University)
- Jared Noyman (Stanford Boys Gymnastics)
- Austin Padgett (Pride Gymnastics Academy)
- ~~Eddie Penev (U.S. Olympic and Paralympic Training Center)~~
- ~~Curran Phillips (Stanford University)~~
- Samuel Phillips (University of Nebraska)
- Rithik Puri (University of Michigan)
- Fred Richard (Massachusetts Elite Gymnastics Academy)
- Caleb Rickard (University of California - Berkeley)
- Noah Sano (University of California - Berkeley)
- Daniel Simmons (University of Oklahoma)
- Ian Skirkey (University of Illinois)
- Blake Sun (Stanford University)
- Ryan Swatscheno (Arizona Men's Gymnastics senior)
- Logan Teal (Troy Gymnastics)
- Erich Upton (U.S. Air Force Academy)
- Favian Valdez (GymTek Academy)
- Colin Van Wicklen (University of Oklahoma)
- Colt Walker (Stanford University)
- Donnell Whittenburg (Salto Gymnastics Center)
- Shane Wiskus (U.S. Olympic and Paralympic Training Center)
- Khoi Young (Stanford University)
- ~~Oliver Zavel (U.S. Air Force Academy)~~
