= Gabriela Vănoagă =

Romanian artistic gymnast

- Full name: Alexia Gabriela Vănoagă
- Born: 21 October 2008 (age 17) Constanța, Romania

Gymnastics career
- Discipline: Women's artistic gymnastics
- Country represented: Romania (2021–present)
- Club: Farul Constanta
- Head coach: Ciprian Cretu
Medal record
Representing Romania
Junior World Championships
Silver medal – second place	2023 Antalya	Balance beam

Alexia Gabriela Vănoagă (born 21 October 2008) is a Romanian artistic gymnast. She is the 2023 Junior World and 2023 European Youth Olympic Festival balance beam silver medalist.

== Gymnastics career ==
=== 2021 ===
Vănoagă won the all-around silver medal in the level 5 division at the 2021 Romanian Junior Championships. She then made her international debut at the FIT Challenge and won the bronze medal with the Romanian junior team. Individually, she finished 19th in the all-around, eighth in the uneven bars final, and seventh in the floor exercise final. Then at the senior-level Romanian Championships, she finished ninth all-around.

=== 2022 ===
Vănoagă began the 2022 season at a friendly meet against Hungary in Tata. The Romanian team won, and Vănoagă won the all-around gold medal. She then finished seventh all-around at the Romanian Junior Championships due to mistakes on the uneven bars. She once again finished seventh in the all-around at the Petrom Cup. At the senior-level Romanian Championships, she finished eighth in the all-around and in the vault final and sixth in the balance beam final. In the floor exercise final, she won the silver medal behind Amalia Ghigoarță. She then competed at the Tournoi International in Combs-la-Ville, France. After only scoring 8.366 on the uneven bars, she finished 20th in the all-around and sixth with her team. She won the all-around title at the Romanian Junior Individual Championships.

=== 2023 ===
Vănoagă began the 2023 season at the DTB Pokal Team Challenge and helped the Romanian junior team place sixth. Individually, she finished sixth in the all-around and fourth in the balance beam final. She was selected to compete at the 2023 Junior World Championships alongside Crina Tudor and Anamaria Mihăescu, and the team finished in eighth place. Individually, she qualified for the balance beam final in fourth place. In the event final, she won the silver medal behind Yu Hanyue with a score of 12.833. She also qualified for the all-around final where she finished 17th. She won Romania's only medal at the Junior World Championships.

Vănoagă won the all-around silver medal at the Rising Stars Trophy in Bucharest behind Croatian Mila Prpic. She was then selected to compete at the European Youth Olympic Festival, and she was selected as one of Romania's flag bearers for the opening ceremony. She qualified for the all-around final where she finished seventh. She then won the silver medal in the balance beam final behind Germany's Helen Kevric with a score of 12.866. She finished sixth in the floor exercise final with a score of 12.366.

== Competitive history ==
Competitive history of Gabriela Vănoagă at the junior level
Year	Event	Team	AA	VT	UB	BB	FX
2021	Romanian Junior Championships		2nd place, silver medalist(s)				
2021	FIT Challenge	3rd place, bronze medalist(s)	19			8	7
2021	Romanian Championships		9				
2022	Tata Junior Friendly	1st place, gold medalist(s)	1st place, gold medalist(s)				
2022	Romanian Junior Championships		7				
2022	Petrom Cup		7				
2022	Romanian Championships		8	8		6	2nd place, silver medalist(s)
2022	Tournoi International	6	20				
2022	Romanian Junior Individual Championships		1st place, gold medalist(s)				
2023	DTB Pokal Stuttgart	6	6			4	
2023	Junior World Championships	8	17			2nd place, silver medalist(s)	
2023	Rising Stars Trophy		2nd place, silver medalist(s)				
2023	European Youth Olympic Festival	6	7			2nd place, silver medalist(s)	6
2023	Romanian Championships		9	2nd place, silver medalist(s)	6	1st place, gold medalist(s)	1st place, gold medalist(s)
2023	Romanian Junior Championships		1st place, gold medalist(s)	3rd place, bronze medalist(s)	2nd place, silver medalist(s)	1st place, gold medalist(s)	1st place, gold medalist(s)
2023	Top Gym Tournament	1st place, gold medalist(s)	2nd place, silver medalist(s)		8	2nd place, silver medalist(s)	10

Competitive history of Gabriela Vănoagă at the senior level
Year	Event	Team	AA	VT	UB	BB	FX
2024	DTB Pokal Team Challenge	9	22				
2024	RomGym Trophy		12			3rd place, bronze medalist(s)	
2024	Gymnova Cup		18				
2024	Romanian Individual Championships		15		6	8	7
2025	Romanian Championships				4		
