= Ming van Eijken =

French artistic gymnast

Ming Gherardi van Eijken
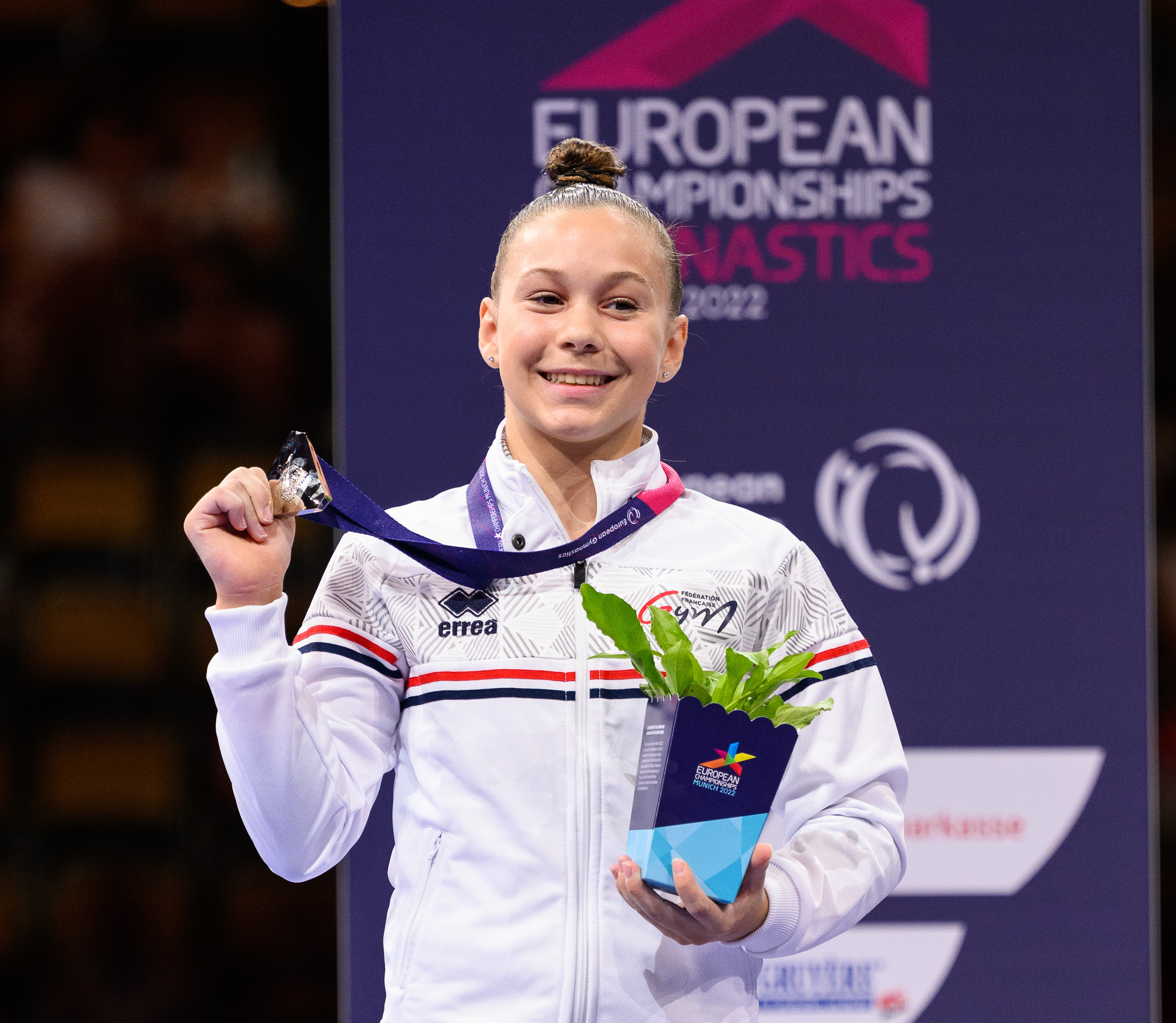
- van Eijken at the 2022 European Championships

Personal information
- Full name: Ming Gherardi van Eijken
- Nickname: Mingou
- Born: 3 April 2008 (age 18) Hong Kong

Gymnastics career
- Discipline: Women's artistic gymnastics
- Country represented: France; (2021–present)
- College team: Florida Gators (2027–30)
- Club: Gym'Dans' Francheville
- Gym: Pole France Saint-Etienne
- Head coaches: Monique Hagard, Marie Angélique Colson, Julien Kerninon
- Former coach: Eric Hagard
- Choreographer: Monique Hagard
Medal record
Representing France
European Championships
| Bronze medal – third place | 2024 Rimini | Team |
| Bronze medal – third place | 2024 Rimini | Vault |
| Bronze medal – third place | 2025 Leipzig | Team |
Junior World Championships
| Bronze medal – third place | 2023 Antalya | Vault |

Ming Gherardi van Eijken (born 3 April 2008) is a French artistic gymnast. She is the 2023 Junior World Championships and 2024 European bronze medalist on vault. She represented France at the 2024 Summer Olympics.

== Personal life ==
Van Eijken was born in 2008 in Hong Kong. She began gymnastics when she was three years old in France. She was born to a Dutch father, French mother, and has an Italian grandfather.

== Junior gymnastics career ==
=== 2022 ===
Van Eijken competed at the 2022 City of Jesolo Trophy where she helped France finish sixth as a team. In August she competed at the European Championships where she helped France finish fifth as a team. During event finals van Eijken won silver on vault behind Sabrina Voinea.

=== 2023 ===
In March van Eijken competed at the DTB Pokal Team Challenge where she helped France place fourth as a team. Individually she won gold on vault and placed fifth on floor exercise. Van Eijken was selected to compete at the 2023 Junior World Championships in Antalya, Turkey alongside Lana Pondart and Lilou Viallat; the team finished in eleventh place. Individually van Eijken qualified for the vault final. During the final van Eijken performed two clean vaults and won the bronze medal behind Mia Mainardi and July Marano, earning France its first ever Junior World Championship medal.

== Senior gymnastics career ==
=== 2024 ===
Van Eijken was selected to make her senior international debut at the 2024 Trophy of Jesolo where she won gold on vault. In May, she competed at the European Championships alongside Marine Boyer, Lorette Charpy, Coline Devillard, and Morgane Osyssek. During event finals, she won bronze on vault behind teammate Devillard and Valentina Georgieva of Bulgaria. During the team final, van Eijken helped France win the bronze medal behind Italy and Great Britain.

In July, van Eijken was officially selected to represent France at the 2024 Olympic Games alongside Boyer, Mélanie de Jesus dos Santos, Devillard, and Osyssek. They finished eleventh in qualifications and did not advance to the team final.

== Competitive history ==
Competitive history of Ming van Eijken at the junior level
| Year | Event | Team | AA | VT | UB | BB | FX |
|---|---|---|---|---|---|---|---|
| 2021 | French Championships | | 3rd place, bronze medalist(s) | | | | |
| 2021 | Swiss Cup Juniors | 3rd place, bronze medalist(s) | 13 | | | | |
| 2021 | Elite Gym Massilia | 4 | | 5 | | | |
| 2021 | French National Team Review | | 4 | | | | |
| 2022 | French Test Meet | | 4 | | | | |
| 2022 | City of Jesolo Trophy | 6 | 28 | | | | |
| 2022 | Haguenau Friendly | 1st place, gold medalist(s) | 11 | | | | |
| 2022 | French Championships | | 6 | 3rd place, bronze medalist(s) | | | |
| 2022 | European Championships | 5 | | 2nd place, silver medalist(s) | | | |
| 2023 | DTB Pokal Team Challenge | 4 | | 1st place, gold medalist(s) | | | 5 |
| 2023 | Junior World Championships | 11 | | 3rd place, bronze medalist(s) | | | |
| 2023 | French Championships | | 10 | 1st place, gold medalist(s) | | | 4 |
| 2023 | Épernay Friendly | 2nd place, silver medalist(s) | 13 | 1st place, gold medalist(s) | | | |
| 2023 | Tournoi International | 3rd place, bronze medalist(s) | | 1st place, gold medalist(s) | 4 | | |

Competitive history of Ming van Eijken at the senior level
| Year | Event | Team | AA | VT | UB | BB | FX |
|---|---|---|---|---|---|---|---|
| 2024 | City of Jesolo Trophy | 5 | | 1st place, gold medalist(s) | | | |
| 2024 | European Championships | 3rd place, bronze medalist(s) | | 3rd place, bronze medalist(s) | | | 8 |
| 2024 | Olympic Games | 11 | | R2 | | | |
| 2024 | Christmas Cup | | | | 2nd place, silver medalist(s) | | |
| 2025 | French Championships | | | 1st place, gold medalist(s) | 1st place, gold medalist(s) | | 1st place, gold medalist(s) |
| 2025 | European Championships | 3rd place, bronze medalist(s) | | 7 | | | 7 |
| 2025 | Paris World Challenge Cup | | | | | | 5 |
| 2025 | World Championships | | | 17 | | | 15 |
| 2026 | City of Jesolo Trophy | 2nd place, silver medalist(s) | | 2nd place, silver medalist(s) | | | |
