= July Marano =

Italian artistic gymnast (born 2008)

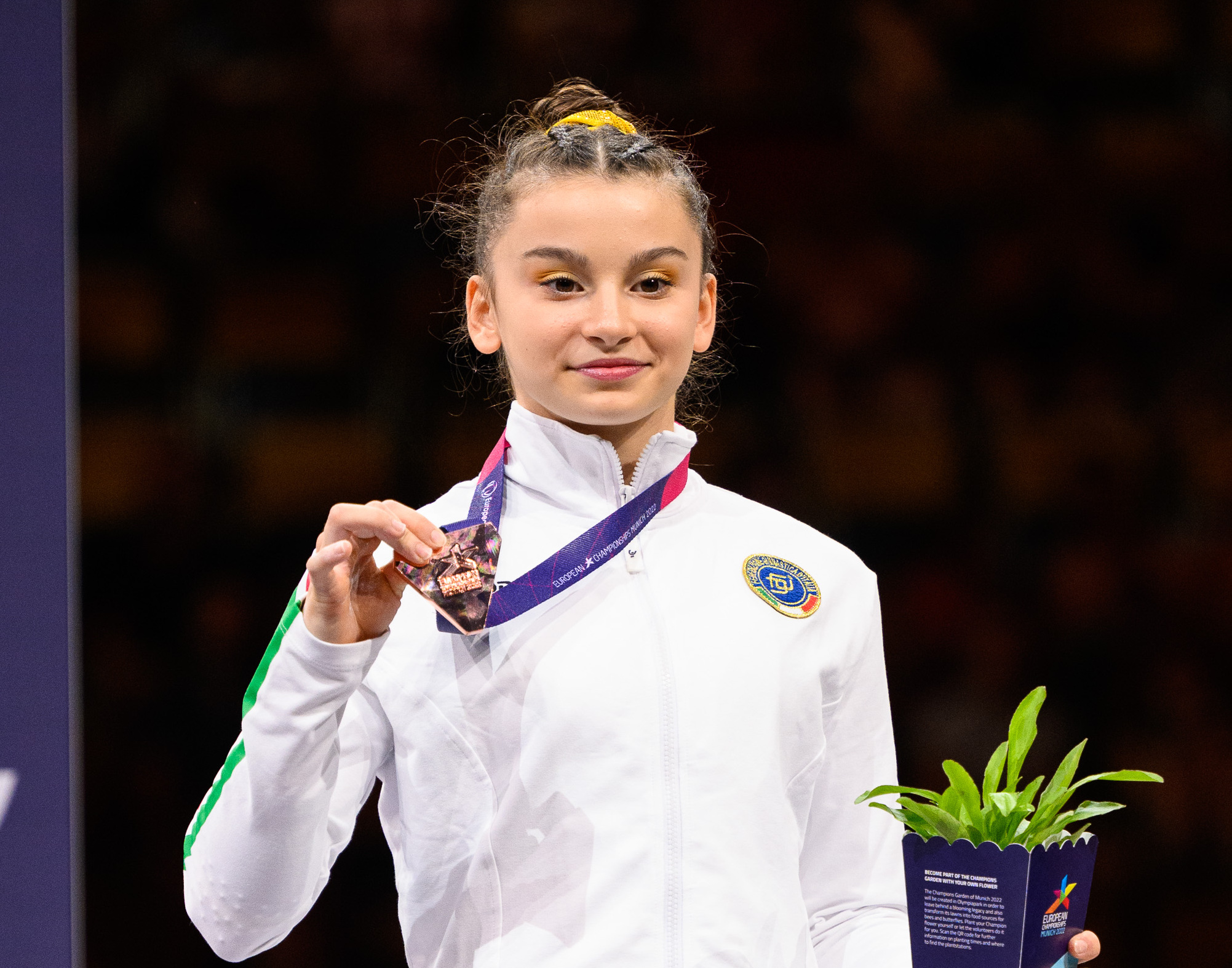
- Marano at the 2022 European Championships

Personal information
- Born: 23 September 2008 (age 18) Capo d'Orlando, Messina, Sicily

Gymnastics career
- Discipline: Women's artistic gymnastics
- Country represented: Italy; (2022–present)
- Club: Ginnastica Civitavecchia
Medal record
Representing Italy
European Championships
Silver medal – second place	2026 Zagreb	Team
Junior World Championships
Silver medal – second place	2023 Antalya	Vault
Bronze medal – third place	2023 Antalya	Team
EYOF
Silver medal – second place	2022 Banskà Bystrica	Floor exercise
Bronze medal – third place	2022 Banskà Bystrica	Team

July Marano (born 23 September 2008) is an Italian artistic gymnast. She is the 2023 Junior World vault silver medalist and team bronze medalist.

== Early life ==
Marano was born in Capo d'Orlando, Messina in 2008. She began gymnastics when she was seven years old.

== Junior gymnastics career ==
=== 2021–2022 ===
Marano finished sixth in the all-around at the 2021 Italian Gold Championships.

Marano made her international debut at the 2022 DTB Team Challenge in Stuttgart. While there she helped Italy finish third as a team and individually she placed fifth on vault. She next competed at the City of Jesolo Trophy where she helped Italy finish second.

In July, Marano competed at the European Youth Olympic Festival alongside Arianna Grillo and Martina Pieratti; they finished third as a team. Individually Marano won silver on floor exercise behind Amalia Puflea and tied with Helen Kevric. The following month Marano competed at the European Championships. She helped Italy win gold as team. Individually she won bronze on vault behind Sabrina Voinea and Ming van Eijken.

=== 2023 ===
Marano began the 2023 season competing at the Luxembourg Open. She won gold on vault, silver on floor exercise, and helped Italy place first as a team. Marano was then selected to compete at the 2023 Junior World Championships alongside Caterina Gaddi and Giulia Perotti. The team won the bronze medal and finished only two-tenths of a point behind the silver medalists from the United States. During event finals Marano won silver on vault behind Mia Mainardi.

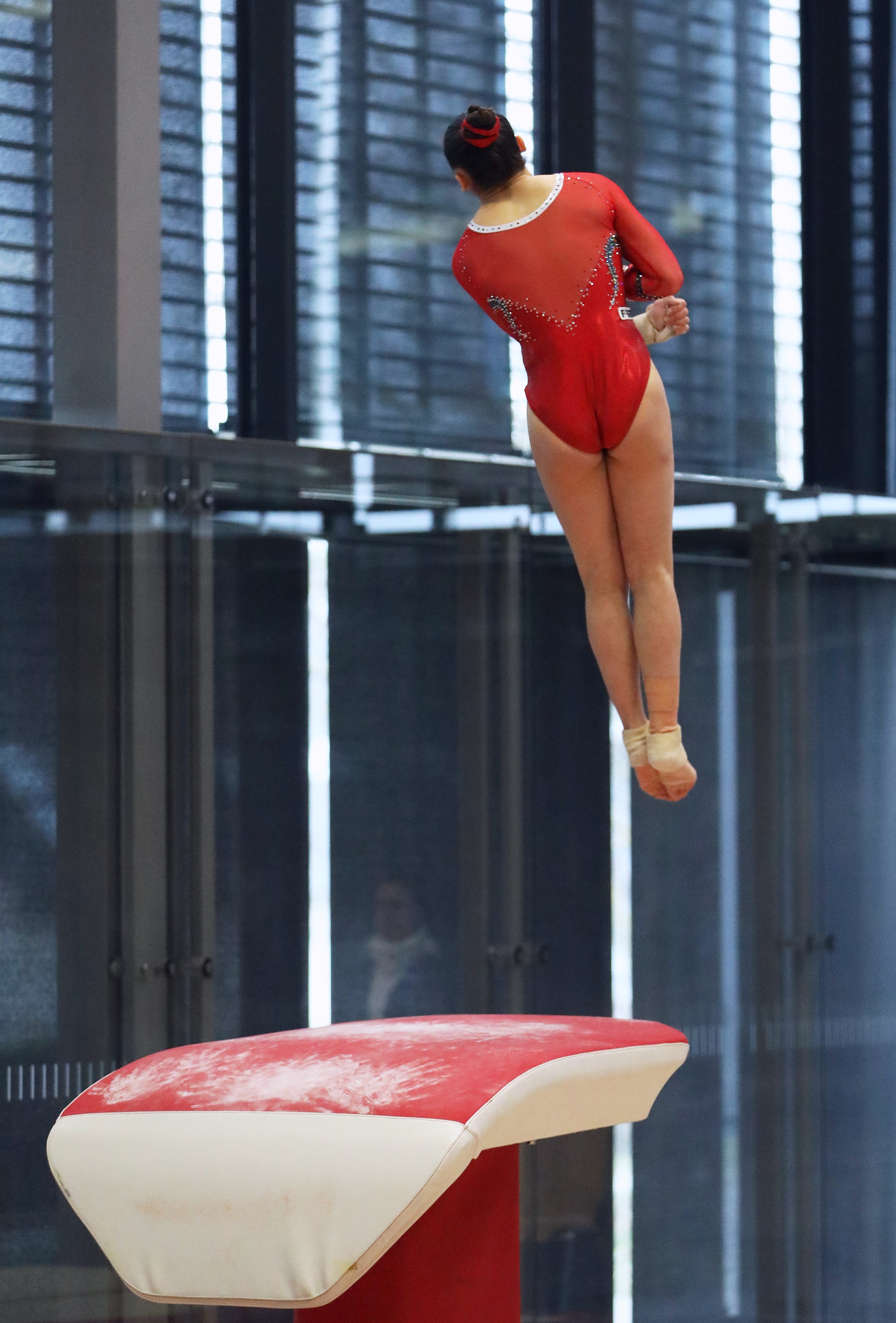
Vault

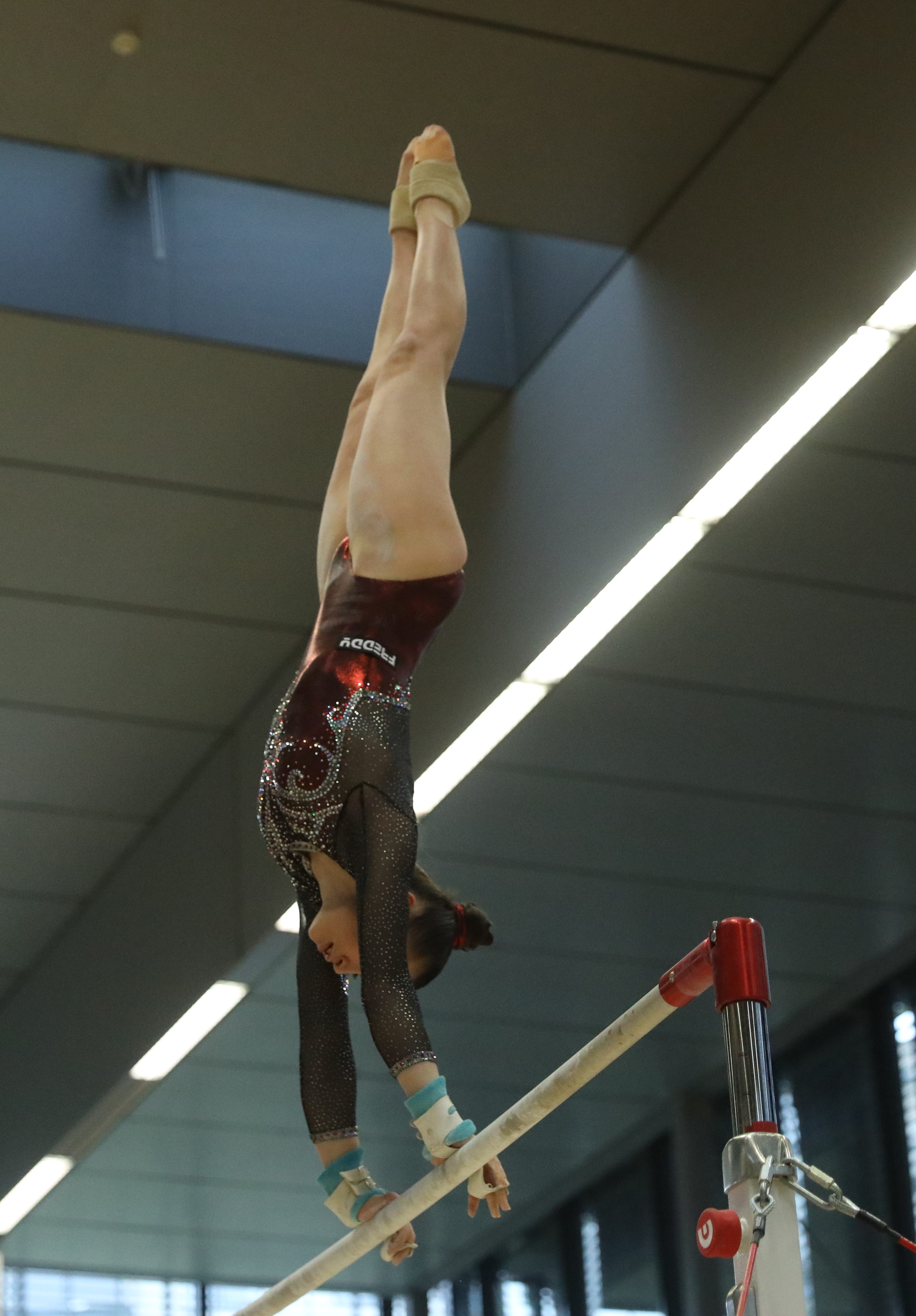
Uneven bars

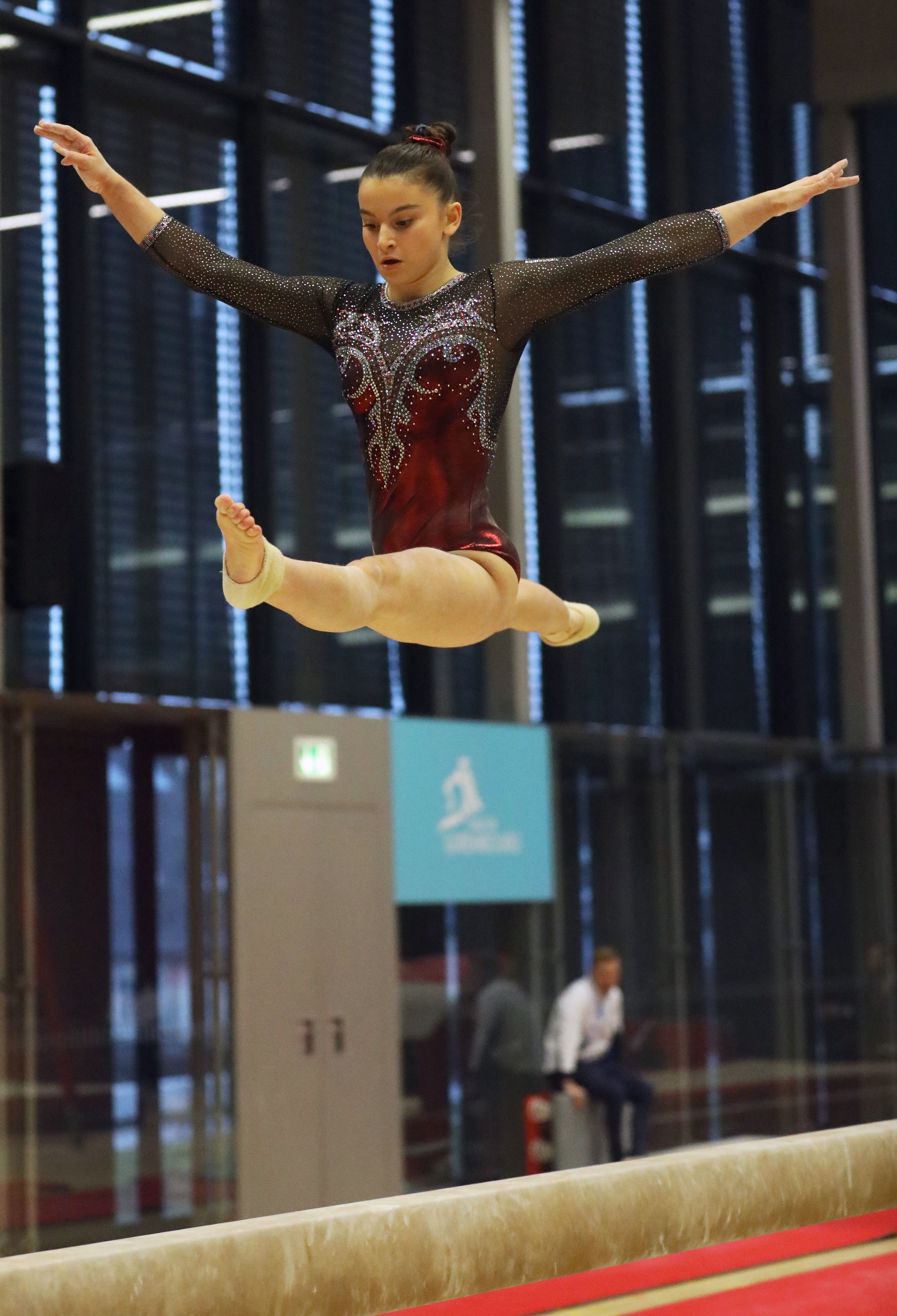
Balance beam

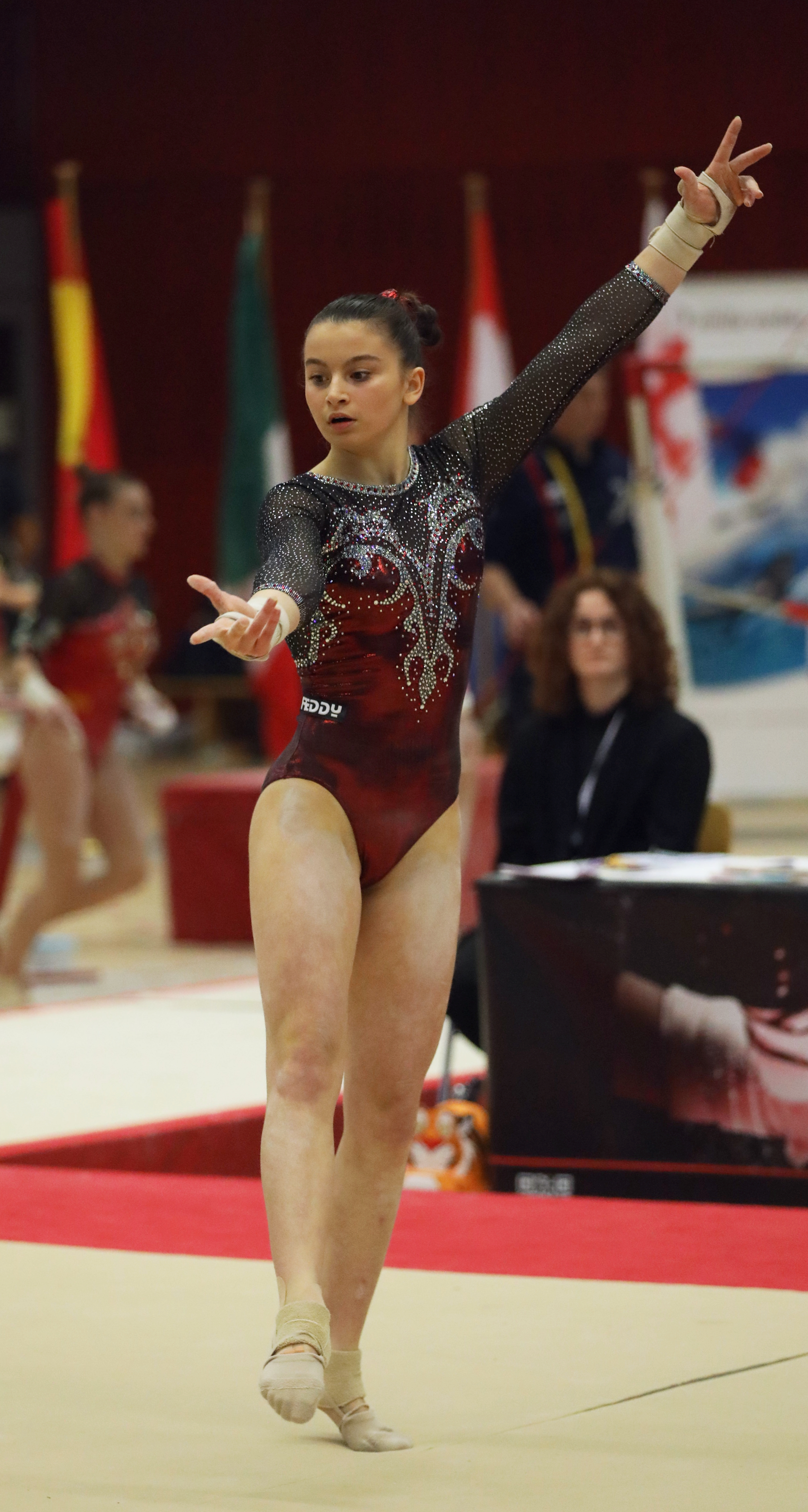
Floor exercise

Marano at the 2023 Luxembourg Open

== Senior gymnastics career ==
=== 2024 ===
Marano became age-eligible for senior competition in 2024. She made her senior debut at the Cairo World Cup where she finished fifth on uneven bars and seventh on floor exercise.

== Competitive history ==
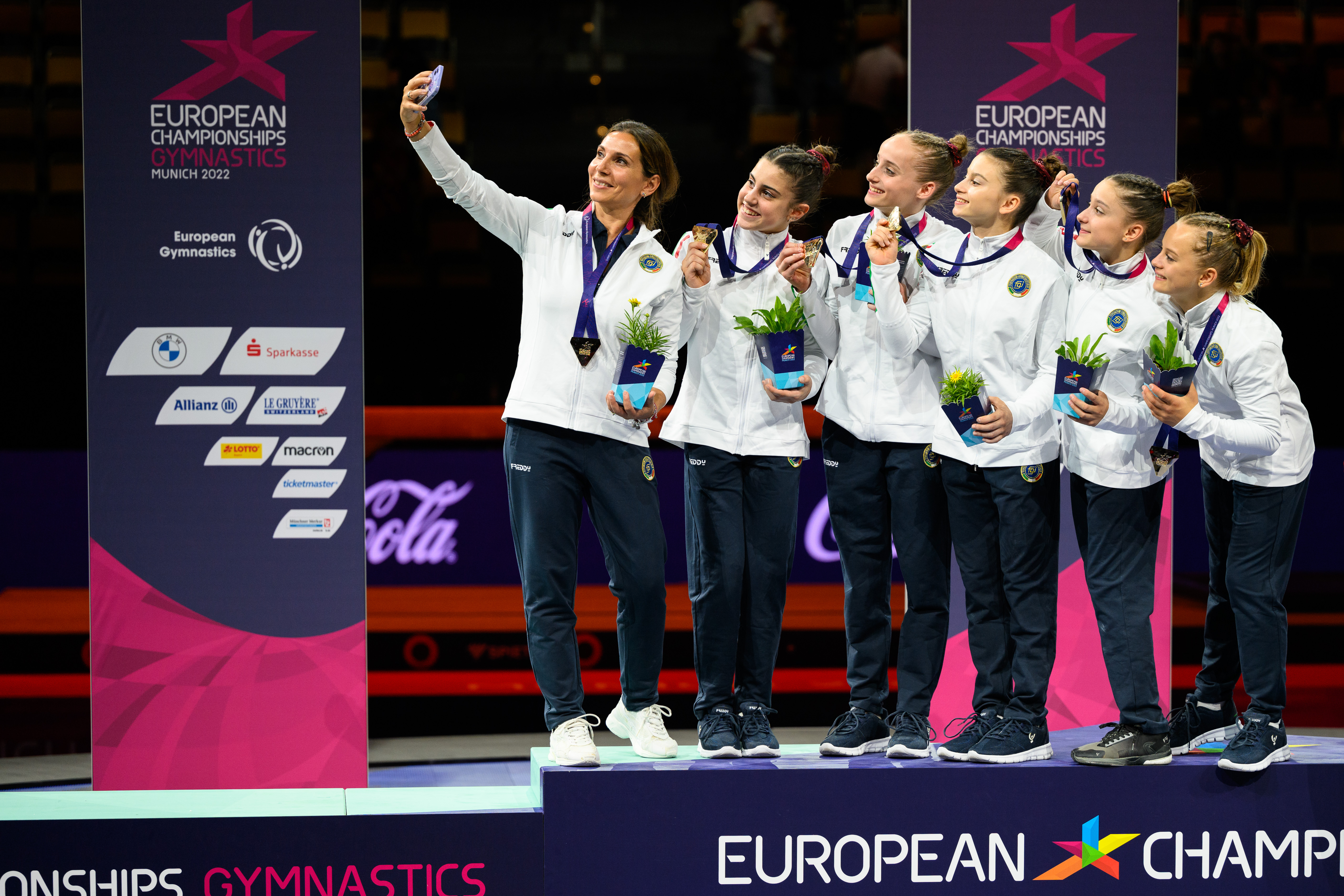
Marano and team Italy at the 2022 European Championships

Competitive history of July Marano at the junior level
Year	Event	Team	AA	VT	UB	BB	FX
2021	Italian Gold Championships		6	5	5		7
2022	DTB Team Challenge	3rd place, bronze medalist(s)		5			
2022	City of Jesolo Trophy	2nd place, silver medalist(s)	14				
2022	European Youth Olympic Festival	3rd place, bronze medalist(s)	8	8			2nd place, silver medalist(s)
2022	European Championships	1st place, gold medalist(s)		3rd place, bronze medalist(s)			
2023	Luxembourg Open	1st place, gold medalist(s)		1st place, gold medalist(s)			2nd place, silver medalist(s)
2023	Junior World Championships	3rd place, bronze medalist(s)		2nd place, silver medalist(s)			

Competitive history of July Marano at the senior level
Year	Event	Team	AA	VT	UB	BB	FX
2024	Cairo World Cup				5		7
2024	City of Jesolo Trophy	6	13				
2025	City of Jesolo Trophy	1st place, gold medalist(s)	10		7		
2025	National Championships		9				
2026	City of Jesolo Trophy	3rd place, bronze medalist(s)	8				3rd place, bronze medalist(s)
2026	Osijek World Cup						4
2026	European Championships	2nd place, silver medalist(s)	6				
2026	World Championships	7					
