= Caterina Gaddi =

Italian artistic gymnast

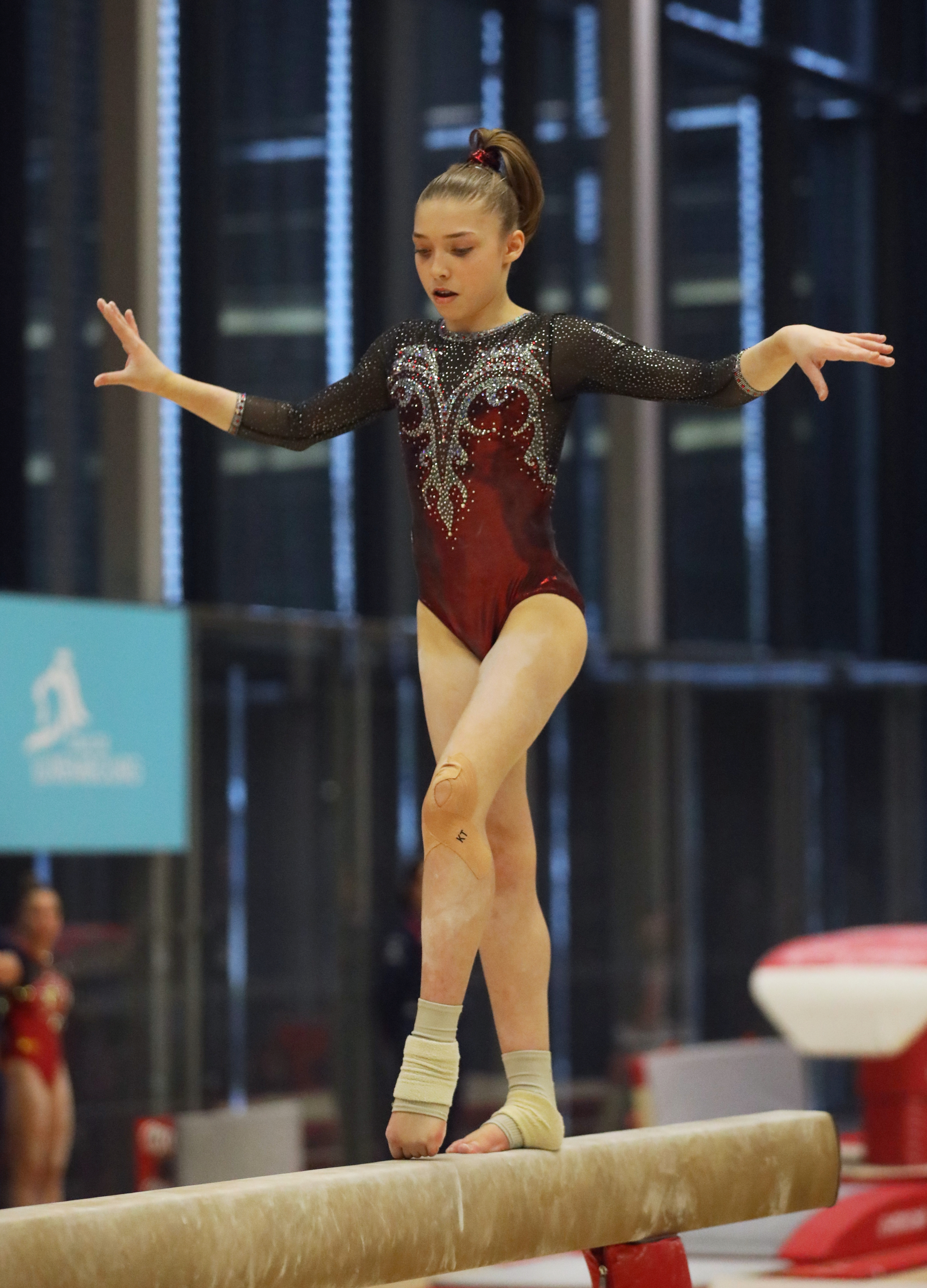
- Gaddi at the 2023 Luxembourg Open

Personal information
- Nickname: Cate
- Born: 10 July 2008 (age 18) Modena, Italy

Gymnastics career
- Discipline: Women's artistic gymnastics
- Country represented: Italy; (2022–present)
- Club: Vis Academy
- Gym: Brixia
- Head coaches: Marco Campodonico, Monica Bergamelli
Medal record
Representing Italy
Junior World Championships
Gold medal – first place	2023 Antalya	Uneven bars
Bronze medal – third place	2023 Antalya	Team
Bronze medal – third place	2023 Antalya	All-around

Caterina Gaddi (born 10 July 2008) is an Italian artistic gymnast. She is the 2023 Junior World uneven bars champion and all-around and team bronze medalist.

== Early life ==
Gaddi was born on 2008 in Modena. Her father Andrea Gaddi played football for the Italy national team.

== Gymnastics career ==
=== Junior ===
==== 2021–2022 ====
Gaddi finished ninth in the all-around at the 2021 Italian Gold Championships. She made her international debut at the 2022 City of Jesolo Trophy and finished third with her club team and fifteenth in the all-around.

==== 2023 ====
Gaddi began the 2023 season at the Luxembourg Open, winning the silver medal in the all-around behind teammate Giulia Perotti, and the Italian team won the gold medal. In the event finals, she won the silver medal on the uneven bars behind teammate Matilde Ferrari and placed fourth on the floor exercise. Gaddi was then selected to compete at the 2023 Junior World Championships alongside Perotti and July Marano. The team won the bronze medal and finished only two-tenths of a point behind the silver medalists from the United States. In the all-around final, Gaddi won the bronze medal behind Japanese gymnasts Haruka Nakamura and Sara Yamaguchi with a total score of 50.899. She then won the gold medal in the uneven bars final ahead of Germany's Helen Kevric and teammate Perotti with a score of 13.600.

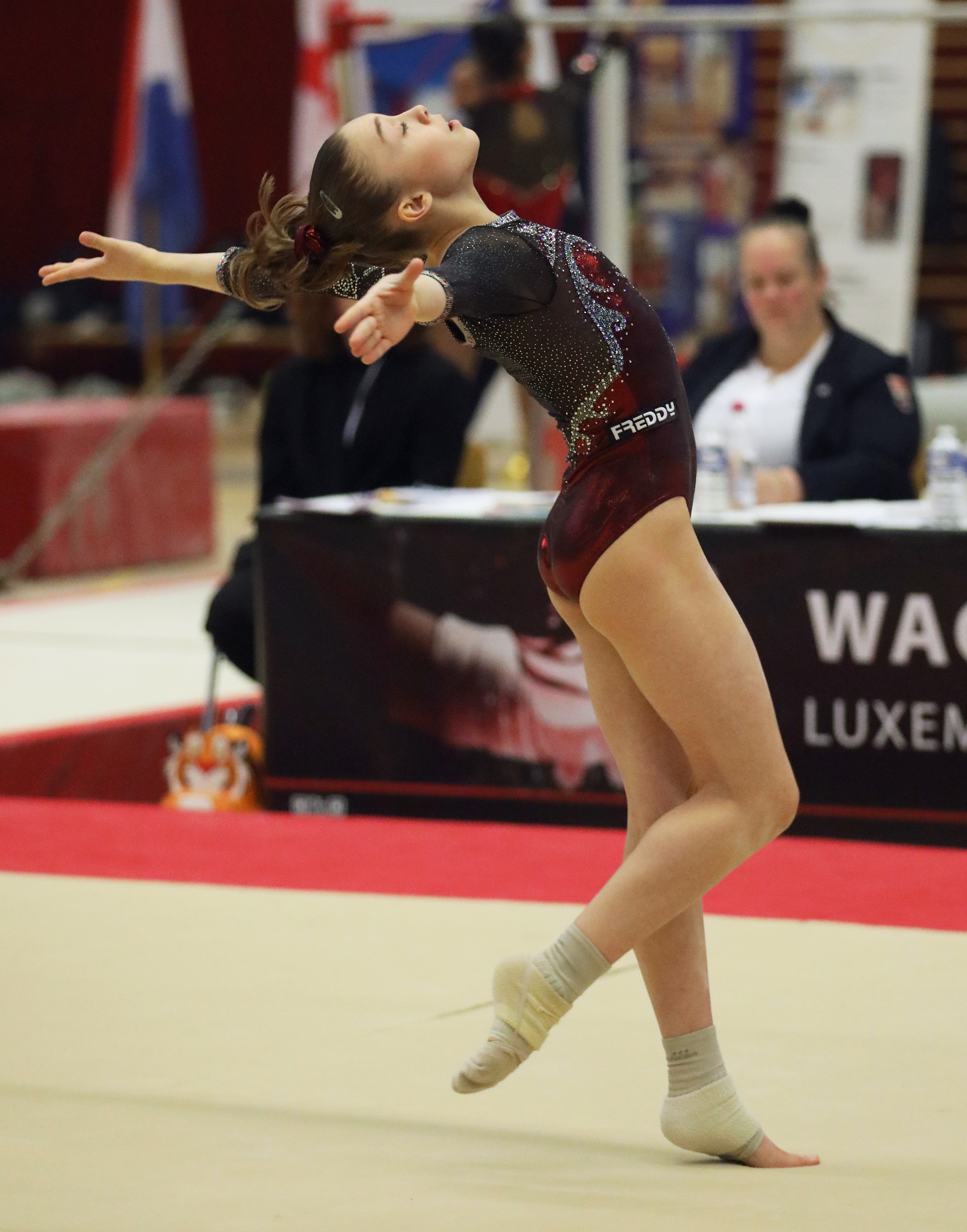
Floor exercise

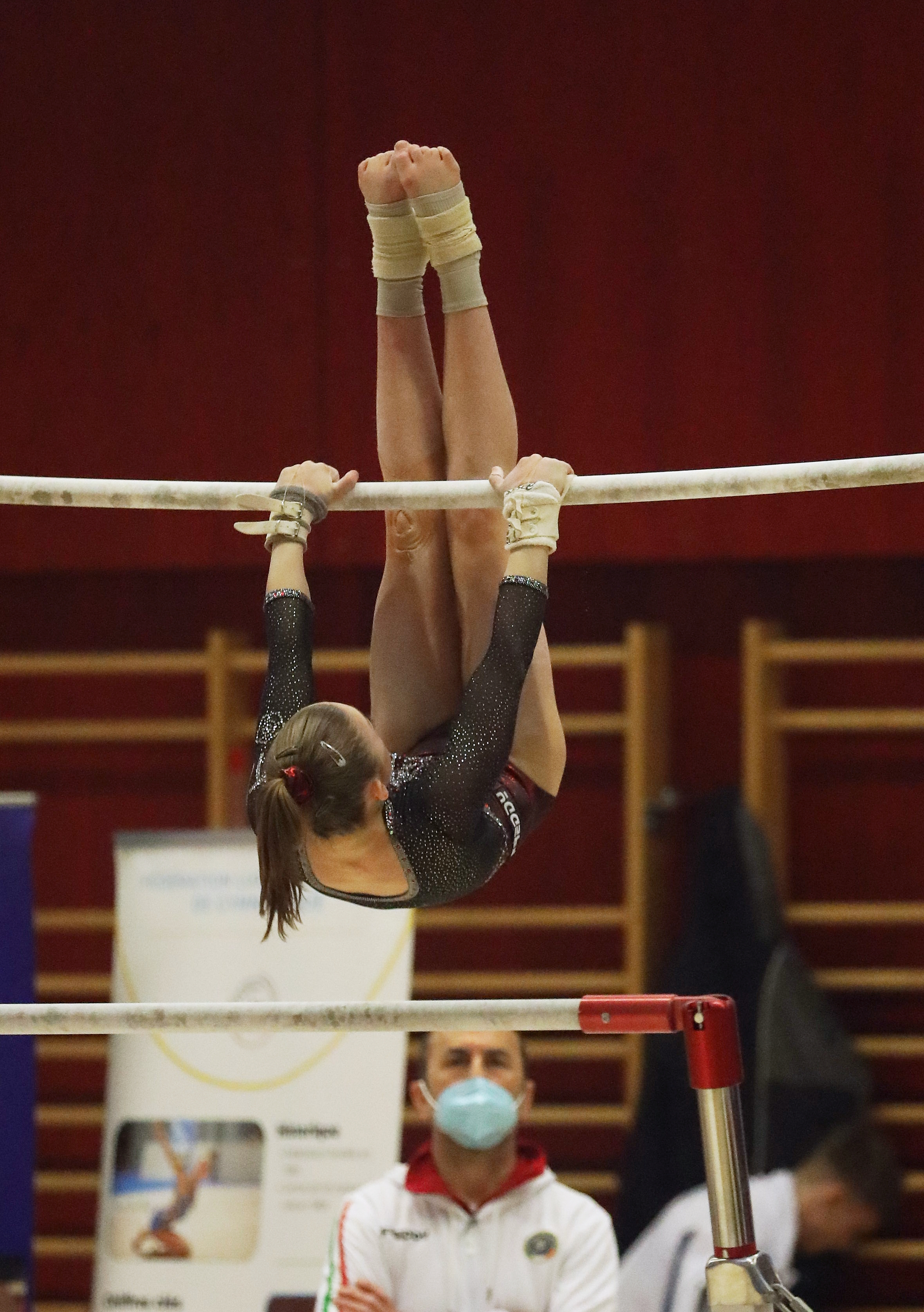
Uneven bars

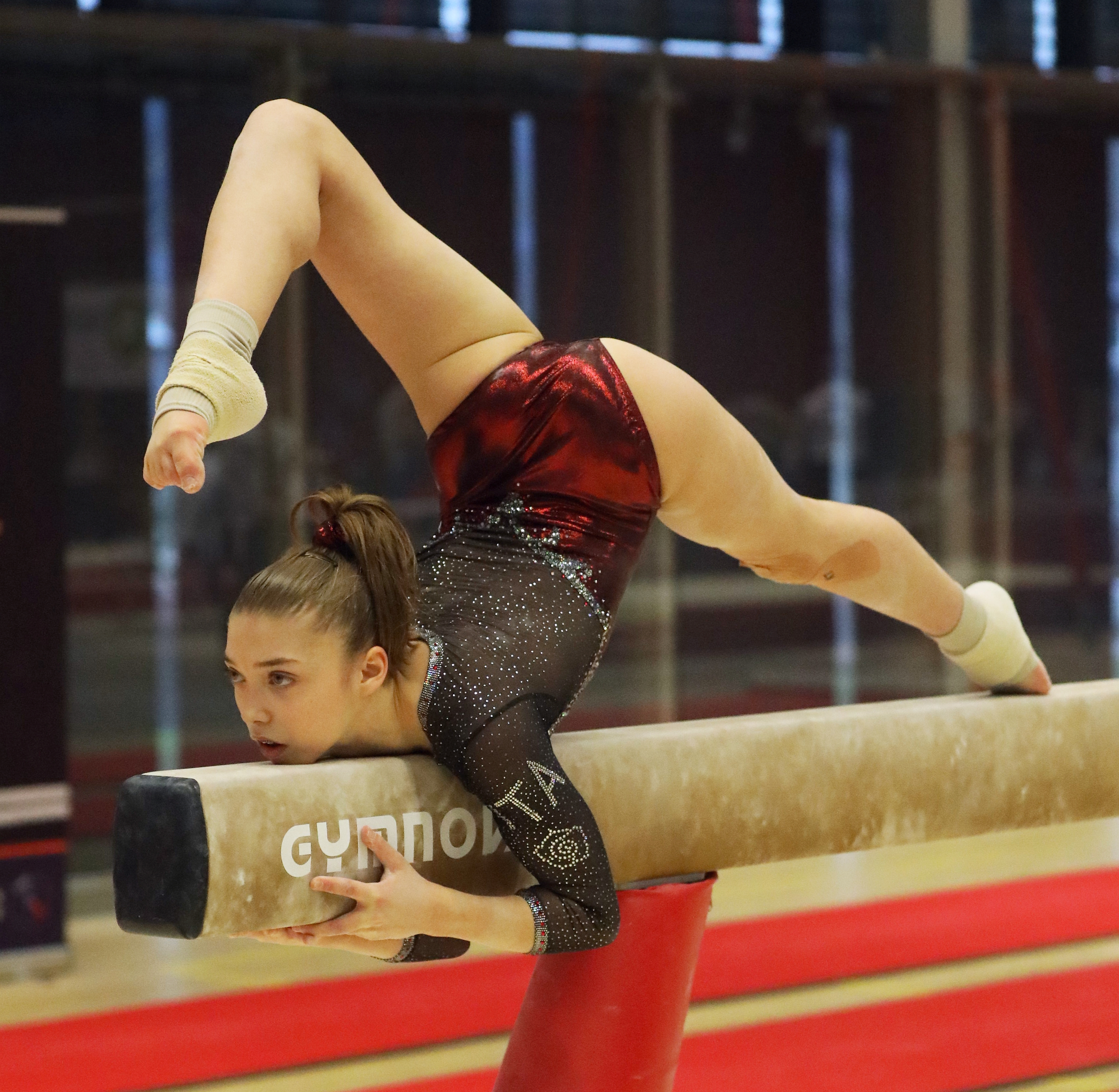
Balance beam

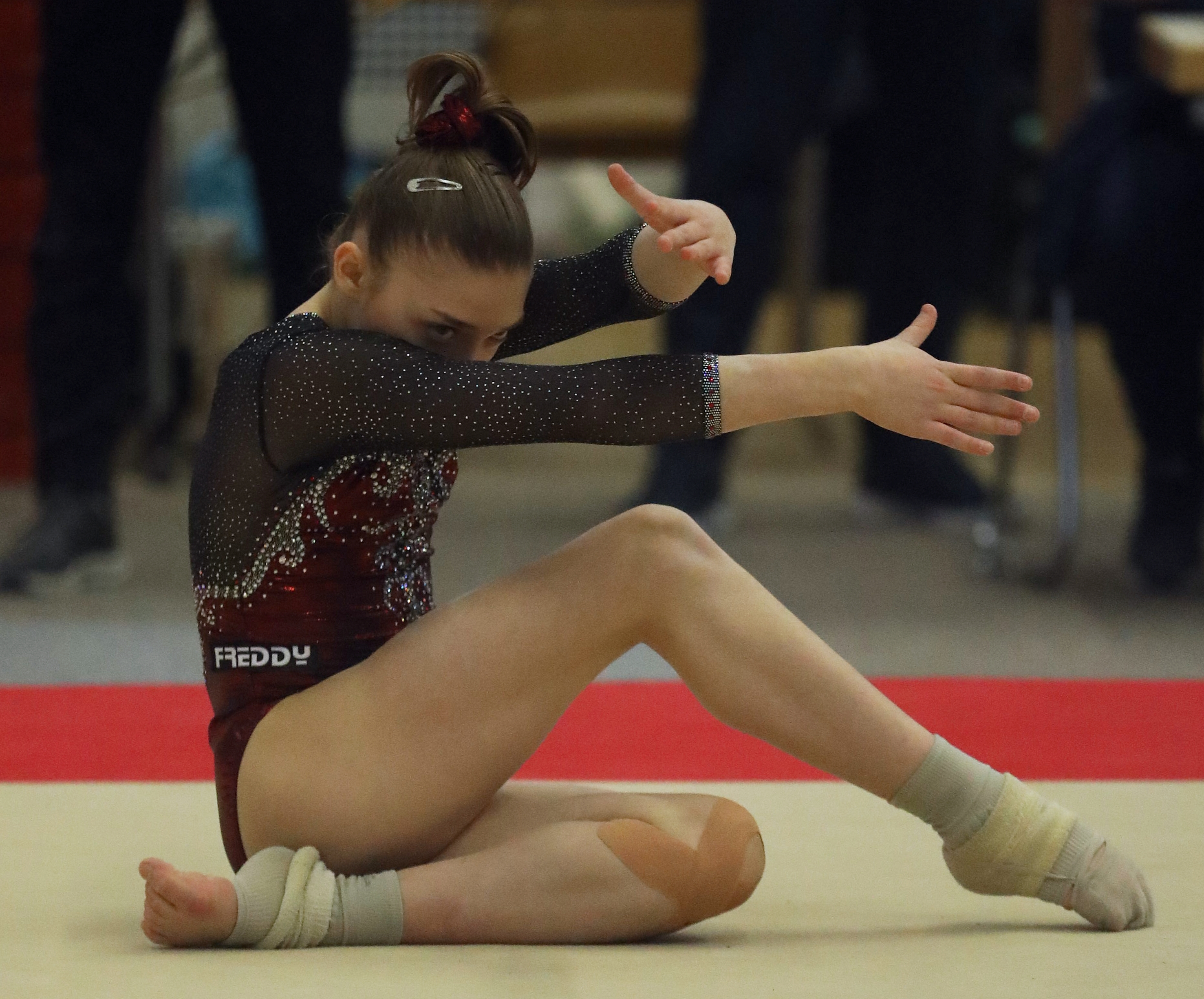
Floor exercise

Gaddi at the 2023 Luxembourg Open

== Competitive history ==
Competitive history of Caterina Gaddi at the junior level
Year	Event	Team	AA	VT	UB	BB	FX
2021	Italian Gold Championships		9		1st place, gold medalist(s)		
2022	City of Jesolo Trophy	3rd place, bronze medalist(s)	15				
2023	Luxembourg Open	1st place, gold medalist(s)	2nd place, silver medalist(s)		2nd place, silver medalist(s)		
2023	Junior World Championships	3rd place, bronze medalist(s)	3rd place, bronze medalist(s)		1st place, gold medalist(s)		

Competitive history of Caterina Gaddi at the senior level
Year	Event	Team	AA	VT	UB	BB	FX
2024	Italian Championships		14				
