= Yu Hanyue =

Chinese artistic gymnast

- Born: 12 September 2008 (age 17) Hunan, China

Gymnastics career
- Discipline: Women's artistic gymnastics
- Country represented: China
- Club: Shanxi Province
Medal record
Representing China
Junior World Championships
Gold medal – first place	2023 Antalya	Balance beam
Junior Asian Championships
Silver medal – second place	2023 Singapore	Team

Yu Hanyue (Chinese: 俞涵悦;born 12 September 2008) is a Chinese artistic gymnast. She is the 2023 Junior World balance beam champion and the 2023 Junior Asian team silver medalist.

== Gymnastics career ==
Yu competed at the 2021 Chinese Youth Games, finishing ninth with the Shanxi provincial team. At the 2022 Chinese Youth Championships, she finished fourteenth in the all-around in the under-14 group. She qualified for the floor exercise final where she finished seventh. Then at the 2022 Chinese Championships, she finished fourteenth with the Shanxi provincial team and thirty-second in the all-around qualification round.

Yu was selected to compete at the 2023 Junior World Championships alongside Jiang Shuxuan and Qin Xinyi, and the team finished in sixth place. Individually, Yu qualified for the balance beam final in second place behind Japan's Sara Yamaguchi with a score of 13.100. In the event final, she won the gold medal with a score of 13.133. Then at the 2023 Junior Asian Championships in Singapore, Yu helped the Chinese team win the silver medal behind Japan. Individually, she finished ninth in the all-around and seventh in the balance beam event final.
