= Sara Yamaguchi =

Japanese artistic gymnast (born 2008)

- Born: 28 April 2008 (age 18)

Gymnastics career
- Discipline: Women's artistic gymnastics
- Country represented: Japan
- Club: Isao Yoneda Gymnastics Club
- Head coach: Mami Yoneda
Medal record
Representing Japan
World Championships
Bronze medal – third place	2026 Rotterdam	Team
Junior World Championships
Gold medal – first place	2023 Antalya	Team
Silver medal – second place	2023 Antalya	All-around

Sara Yamaguchi (born 28 April 2008) is a Japanese artistic gymnast. She is the 2023 Junior World all-around silver medalist and team champion, and she was the alternate for the bronze medal-winning team at the 2026 World Championships. Yamaguchi is the 2022 Japanese balance beam and floor exercise champion.

== Gymnastics career ==
Yamaguchi qualified for the floor exercise final at the 2021 All-Japan Event Championships and finished in seventh place. Then at the 2021 All-Japan Team Championships, she helped her club, Cartwheel Gymnastics, finish in eighth place, and she finished seventh in the all-around.

Yamaguchi finished tenth in the all-around at the 2022 All-Japan Championships. She then finished eighth all-around at the 2022 NHK Cup, and she had the highest scores of the event on both the balance beam and floor exercise. Then at the 2022 All-Japan Event Championships, she won the gold medal on both the balance beam and floor exercise. She helped her club finish in fourth place at the 2022 All-Japan Team Championships, and she won the all-around bronze medal behind Shoko Miyata and Mana Okamura.

Yamaguchi made her international debut at the 2023 Junior World Championships in Antalya, Turkey. The Japanese team of Yamaguchi, Mika Mizuno, and Haruka Nakamura won the gold medal by over two points ahead of the United States. The team competition also served as the qualification round, and she qualified in first place for the all-around final and also qualified for the uneven bars and balance beam finals. In the all-around final, she fell on her Yurchenko 1.5 vault and finished second behind her teammate Nakamura. She then finished fifth in the uneven bars final and fourth in the balance beam final.

Yamaguchi was in the lead after the first day of the 2023 All-Japan Championships with a total score of 54.566, almost a full point ahead of World champion Watanabe Hazuki. However, on the second day of competition, she tore her ACL on her balance beam dismount. She tore the same ACL for a second time in podium training at the 2024 All-Japan Championships, which took her out of contention for the 2024 Olympic team.
