= 2023 Junior World Artistic Gymnastics Championships =

Gymnastics competition in Turkey

2nd Junior World Artistic Gymnastics Championships
- Venue: Antalya Gymnastics Hall
- Location: Antalya, Turkey
- Dates: 29 March – 2 April 2023
- Competitors: 283 from 64 nations

The 2023 Junior World Artistic Gymnastics Championships was the second iteration of the Artistic Gymnastics Junior World Championships. They were held in Antalya, Turkey from 29 March to 2 April 2023.

== Competition schedule ==
| Date | Session | Time | Subdivisions |
|---|---|---|---|
| Wednesday, 29 March | Boy's Individual Qualification & Team Final | 10:00 AM | MAG: Subdivision 1 MxG 2, Germany, Chinese Taipei, China, Mexico, Korea, Great Britain, United States, Bulgaria, Azerbaijan, Italy |
| Wednesday, 29 March | Boy's Individual Qualification & Team Final | 1:15 PM | MAG: Subdivision 2 Spain, Sweden, Uzbekistan, Hungary, Armenia, Romania, MxG 1, MxG 5, France, Iran |
| Wednesday, 29 March | Boy's Individual Qualification & Team Final | 4:00 PM | MAG: Subdivision 3 Greece, Brazil, Belgium, Japan, Vietnam, Lithuania, Ukraine, Australia, MxG 3, Norway, Turkey |
| Wednesday, 29 March | Boy's Individual Qualification & Team Final | 7:15 PM | MAG: Subdivision 4 MxG 6, Finland, Egypt, Kazakhstan, New Zealand, Canada, Argentina, Latvia, South Africa, MxG4 |
| Thursday, 30 March | Girls Individual Qualification & Team Final | 10:00 AM | WAG: Subdivision 1 MxG 3, Panama, Brazil, United States, Hungary, France, Denmark |
| Thursday, 30 March | Girls Individual Qualification & Team Final | 12:00 PM | WAG: Subdivision 2 MxG 1, Guatemala, Spain, Chinese Taipei, Norway, Italy, Argentina |
| Thursday, 30 March | Girls Individual Qualification & Team Final | 2:15 PM | WAG: Subdivision 3 MxG 2, Greece, Romania, Finland, Cyprus, Czech Republic, Ecuador |
| Thursday, 30 March | Girls Individual Qualification & Team Final | 4:15 PM | WAG: Subdivision 4 MxG 6, Germany, Turkey, Bulgaria, Egypt, Slovenia, Azerbaijan |
| Thursday, 30 March | Girls Individual Qualification & Team Final | 6:30 PM | WAG: Subdivision 5 Japan, Ukraine, Korea, Uzbekistan, Mexico, Belgium, MxG 4 |
| Thursday, 30 March | Girls Individual Qualification & Team Final | 8:30 PM | WAG: Subdivision 6 Canada, Portugal, MxG 5, China, Great Britain, Kazakhstan, Portugal |
| Friday, 31 March | Boy's Individual All-Around Final | 2:30 PM | Top 24 from qualification |
| Friday, 31 March | Girl's Individual All-Around Final | 7:00 PM | Top 24 from qualification |
| Saturday, 1 April | Apparatus Finals | 2:00 PM | MAG: Floor, Pommel horse, Rings |
| Saturday, 1 April | Apparatus Finals | 2:00 PM | WAG: Vault, Uneven bars |
| Sunday, 2 April | Apparatus Finals | 2:00 PM | MAG: Vault, Parallel bars, Horizontal bar |
| Sunday, 2 April | Apparatus Finals | 2:00 PM | WAG: Balance beam, Floor |
Listed in local time (UTC+03:00).

== Medals summary ==
=== Medalists ===
| Event | Gold | Silver | Bronze |
|---|---|---|---|
Boys
| Team | Japan; Haruto Kamiyama; Masaharu Tanida; Tomoharu Tsunogai; Renato Noda | China; He Xiang; Qin Guohuan; Yang Chunjie; Zhang Yangyu | Italy; Manuel Berettera; Tommaso Brugnami; Riccardo Villa; Lorenzo Tomei |
| All-around | (China) Qin Guohuan | (Colombia) Ángel Barajas | (Italy) Riccardo Villa |
| Floor | (Colombia) Ángel Barajas | (Germany) Timo Eder | (Italy) Tommaso Brugnami |
| Pommel horse | (Armenia) Hamlet Manukyan | (Armenia) Mamikon Khachatryan | (Kazakhstan) Zeinolla Idrissov |
| Rings | (Armenia) Hamlet Manukyan | (Japan) Masaharu Tanida | (Italy) Riccardo Villa |
| Vault | (Italy) Tommaso Brugnami | (Canada) Victor Canuel | (Hungary) Szilárd Závory |
| Parallel bars | (Colombia) Ángel Barajas (Japan) Tomoharu Tsunogai | Not awarded | (Egypt) Yahia Zakaria |
| Horizontal bar | (Japan) Tomoharu Tsunogai | (China) He Xiang | (Colombia) Ángel Barajas |
Girls
| Team | Japan; Mika Mizuno; Haruka Nakamura; Sara Yamaguchi; Saki Kawakami | United States; Jayla Hang; Hezly Rivera; Izzy Stassi; Kieryn Finnell | Italy; Caterina Gaddi; July Marano; Giulia Perotti; Matilde Ferrari |
| All-around | (Japan) Haruka Nakamura | (Japan) Sara Yamaguchi | (Italy) Caterina Gaddi |
| Vault | (Argentina) Mia Mainardi | (Italy) July Marano | (France) Ming van Eijken |
| Uneven bars | (Italy) Caterina Gaddi | (Germany) Helen Kevric | (Italy) Giulia Perotti |
| Balance beam | (China) Yu Hanyue | (Romania) Gabriela Vănoagă | (Canada) Cristella Brunetti-Burns |
| Floor | (Italy) Giulia Perotti | (United States) Hezly Rivera | (Japan) Haruka Nakamura |

=== Medal standings ===
==== Overall ====
* Host nation (Turkey)

| Rank | Nation | Gold | Silver | Bronze | Total |
|---|---|---|---|---|---|
| 1 | Japan (JPN) | 5 | 2 | 1 | 8 |
| 2 | Italy (ITA) | 3 | 1 | 7 | 11 |
| 3 | China (CHN) | 2 | 2 | 0 | 4 |
| 4 | Colombia (COL) | 2 | 1 | 1 | 4 |
| 5 | Armenia (ARM) | 2 | 1 | 0 | 3 |
| 6 | Argentina (ARG) | 1 | 0 | 0 | 1 |
| 7 | Germany (GER) | 0 | 2 | 0 | 2 |
| 7 | United States (USA) | 0 | 2 | 0 | 2 |
| 9 | Canada (CAN) | 0 | 1 | 1 | 2 |
| 10 | Romania (ROU) | 0 | 1 | 0 | 1 |
| 11 | Egypt (EGY) | 0 | 0 | 1 | 1 |
| 11 | France (FRA) | 0 | 0 | 1 | 1 |
| 11 | Hungary (HUN) | 0 | 0 | 1 | 1 |
| 11 | Kazakhstan (KAZ) | 0 | 0 | 1 | 1 |
| 15 | Turkey (TUR)* | 0 | 0 | 0 | 0 |
| Totals (15 entries) | | 15 | 13 | 14 | 42 |

==== Boys ====
* Host nation (Turkey)

| Rank | Nation | Gold | Silver | Bronze | Total |
|---|---|---|---|---|---|
| 1 | Japan (JPN) | 3 | 1 | 0 | 4 |
| 2 | Colombia (COL) | 2 | 1 | 1 | 4 |
| 3 | Armenia (ARM) | 2 | 1 | 0 | 3 |
| 4 | China (CHN) | 1 | 2 | 0 | 3 |
| 5 | Italy (ITA) | 1 | 0 | 4 | 5 |
| 6 | Canada (CAN) | 0 | 1 | 0 | 1 |
| 6 | Germany (GER) | 0 | 1 | 0 | 1 |
| 8 | Egypt (EGY) | 0 | 0 | 1 | 1 |
| 8 | Hungary (HUN) | 0 | 0 | 1 | 1 |
| 8 | Kazakhstan (KAZ) | 0 | 0 | 1 | 1 |
| 11 | Turkey (TUR)* | 0 | 0 | 0 | 0 |
| Totals (11 entries) | | 9 | 7 | 8 | 24 |

==== Girls ====
* Host nation (Turkey)

| Rank | Nation | Gold | Silver | Bronze | Total |
|---|---|---|---|---|---|
| 1 | Italy (ITA) | 2 | 1 | 3 | 6 |
| 2 | Japan (JPN) | 2 | 1 | 1 | 4 |
| 3 | Argentina (ARG) | 1 | 0 | 0 | 1 |
| 3 | China (CHN) | 1 | 0 | 0 | 1 |
| 5 | United States (USA) | 0 | 2 | 0 | 2 |
| 6 | Germany (GER) | 0 | 1 | 0 | 1 |
| 6 | Romania (ROU) | 0 | 1 | 0 | 1 |
| 8 | Canada (CAN) | 0 | 0 | 1 | 1 |
| 8 | France (FRA) | 0 | 0 | 1 | 1 |
| 10 | Turkey (TUR)* | 0 | 0 | 0 | 0 |
| Totals (10 entries) | | 6 | 6 | 6 | 18 |

== Men's results ==
=== Team ===
| Rank | Team | Floor (gymnastics) | Pommel horse | Rings (gymnastics) | Vault (gymnastics) | Parallel bars | Horizontal bar | Total |
|---|---|---|---|---|---|---|---|---|
| 1st place, gold medalist(s) | Japan | 27.533 (1) | 26.433 (4) | 26.733 (2) | 28.666 (1) | 28.233 (1) | 27.233 (1) | 164.831 |
| 1st place, gold medalist(s) | Haruto Kamiyama | 13.733 | 13.333 | 13.166 | 14.166 | 13.766 | 11.666 | 164.831 |
| 1st place, gold medalist(s) | Masaharu Tanida | 13.800 | 9.633 | 13.400 | 14.500 | 14.333 | 13.633 | 164.831 |
| 1st place, gold medalist(s) | Tomoharu Tsunogai | 13.733 | 13.100 | 13.333 | 13.700 | 13.900 | 13.600 | 164.831 |
| 2nd place, silver medalist(s) | China | 26.466 (4) | 27.332 (2) | 26.366 (4) | 27.099 (12) | 27.800 (2) | 26.166 (2) | 161.229 |
| 2nd place, silver medalist(s) | He Xiang | 13.166 | 13.466 | 13.133 | 13.066 | 13.400 | 13.200 | 161.229 |
| 2nd place, silver medalist(s) | Qin Guohuan | 12.500 | 13.066 | 13.133 | 14.033 | 14.000 | 12.966 | 161.229 |
| 2nd place, silver medalist(s) | Yang Chunjie | 13.300 | 13.866 | 13.233 | 13.033 | 13.800 | 12.733 | 161.229 |
| 3rd place, bronze medalist(s) | Italy | 26.799 (3) | 25.100 (10) | 26.700 (3) | 28.633 (2) | 26.200 (8) | 26.166 (2) | 159.598 |
| 3rd place, bronze medalist(s) | Manuel Berettera | 13.166 | 11.566 | 13.000 | 13.600 | 12.900 | 12.933 | 159.598 |
| 3rd place, bronze medalist(s) | Tommaso Brugnami | 13.633 | 12.700 | 13.100 | 14.400 | 13.200 | 12.866 | 159.598 |
| 3rd place, bronze medalist(s) | Riccardo Villa | 12.933 | 12.400 | 13.600 | 14.233 | 13.000 | 13.233 | 159.598 |
| 4 | Armenia | 25.666 (10) | 28.133 (1) | 27.032 (1) | 26.699 (18) | 26.699 (3) | 24.932 (11) | 159.161 |
| 4 | Erik Baghdasaryan | 12.966 | 12.266 | 13.366 | 13.566 | 13.533 | 12.866 | 159.161 |
| 4 | Mamikon Khachatryan | 12.700 | 14.000 | 13.000 | 13.133 | 12.800 | 11.866 | 159.161 |
| 4 | Hamlet Manukyan | 12.533 | 14.133 | 13.666 | 12.866 | 13.166 | 12.066 | 159.161 |
| 5 | France | 25.766 (8) | 26.066 (6) | 25.966 (7) | 27.866 (3) | 25.966 (10) | 26.066 (4) | 157.696 |
| 5 | Romain Cavallaro | 12.366 | 12.666 | 12.966 | 13.866 | 13.166 | 12.866 | 157.696 |
| 5 | Manoah Felicite | 11.766 | 13.400 | 10.400 | 13.700 | 11.633 | 12.366 | 157.696 |
| 5 | Anthony Mansard | 13.400 | 12.566 | 13.000 | 14.000 | 12.800 | 13.200 | 157.696 |
| 6 | United States | 26.166 (5) | 25.199 (8) | 26.333 (5) | 27.400 (8) | 26.499 (5) | 25.933 (5) | 157.530 |
| 6 | Kiran Mandava | 10.766 | 12.766 | 13.133 | 13.700 | 13.000 | 12.400 | 157.530 |
| 6 | David Shamah | 13.200 | 11.933 | 13.066 | 13.333 | 13.366 | 12.933 | 157.530 |
| 6 | Kai Uemura | 12.966 | 12.433 | 13.200 | 13.700 | 13.133 | 13.000 | 157.530 |
| 7 | Great Britain | 26.033 (6) | 26.533 (3) | 25.799 (10) | 26.833 (16) | 26.300 (6) | 25.833 (6) | 157.331 |
| 7 | George Atkins | 12.166 | 9.566 | 12.966 | 13.000 | 12.800 | 12.666 | 157.331 |
| 7 | Winston Powell | 13.100 | 13.100 | 12.766 | 13.833 | 13.500 | 13.133 | 157.331 |
| 7 | Alexander Yolshin-Cash | 12.933 | 13.433 | 12.833 | 12.633 | 11.933 | 12.700 | 157.331 |
| 8 | Germany | 26.999 (2) | 24.599 (14) | 25.799 (10) | 27.500 (4) | 25.433 (16) | 25.666 (7) | 155.996 |
| 8 | Timo Eder | 13.333 | 11.100 | 12.733 | 13.700 | 13.300 | 12.966 | 155.996 |
| 8 | Alexander Kirchner | 12.000 | 12.766 | 12.866 | 12.766 | 12.133 | 12.466 | 155.996 |
| 8 | Maxim Kovalenko | 13.666 | 11.833 | 12.933 | 13.800 | 12.100 | 12.700 | 155.996 |

=== Individual all-around ===
| Rank | Gymnast | Floor (gymnastics) | Pommel horse | Rings (gymnastics) | Vault (gymnastics) | Parallel bars | Horizontal bar | Total |
|---|---|---|---|---|---|---|---|---|
| 1st place, gold medalist(s) | (China) Qin Guohuan | 12.700 | 13.233 | 13.000 | 14.400 | 13.733 | 13.133 | 80.199 |
| 2nd place, silver medalist(s) | (Colombia) Ángel Barajas | 13.866 | 12.233 | 12.933 | 13.366 | 13.733 | 14.000 | 80.131 |
| 3rd place, bronze medalist(s) | (Italy) Riccardo Villa | 13.266 | 13.300 | 13.300 | 14.033 | 12.866 | 12.900 | 79.665 |
| 4 | (Japan) Tomoharu Tsunogai | 13.533 | 12.266 | 13.033 | 13.166 | 14.066 | 13.600 | 79.664 |
| 5 | (Germany) Timo Eder | 13.566 | 13.633 | 12.666 | 13.733 | 12.866 | 12.833 | 79.297 |
| 6 | (Armenia) Hamlet Manukyan | 12.900 | 14.533 | 13.500 | 12.633 | 12.900 | 12.200 | 78.666 |
| 7 | (Japan) Haruto Kamiyama | 13.900 | 11.533 | 12.866 | 14.666 | 13.066 | 12.633 | 78.664 |
| 8 | (France) Anthony Mansard | 13.233 | 12.333 | 12.400 | 14.000 | 13.000 | 13.300 | 78.266 |
| 9 | (China) Yang Chunjie | 11.733 | 14.166 | 13.033 | 13.000 | 13.166 | 13.133 | 78.231 |
| 10 | (United Kingdom) Alexander Yolshin-Cash | 12.600 | 13.433 | 12.566 | 13.566 | 13.333 | 12.466 | 77.964 |
| 11 | (Egypt) Mohamed Attia | 13.066 | 13.033 | 12.433 | 13.100 | 12.900 | 12.933 | 77.465 |
| 12 | (Armenia) Erik Baghdasaryan | 12.866 | 12.400 | 13.233 | 12.666 | 13.166 | 13.133 | 77.464 |
| 13 | (Italy) Tommaso Brugnami | 13.633 | 11.433 | 12.733 | 13.866 | 12.900 | 12.800 | 77.365 |
| 14 | (Germany) Maxim Kovalenko | 13.500 | 11.666 | 12.966 | 14.066 | 11.900 | 12.666 | 77.764 |
| 15 | (France) Romain Cavallaro | 12.266 | 12.300 | 13.066 | 13.666 | 12.966 | 12.466 | 76.730 |
| 16 | (United Kingdom) Winston Powell | 13.100 | 13.033 | 12.600 | 13.800 | 11.066 | 12.000 | 75.599 |
| 17 | (Austria) Alfred Schwaiger | 12.100 | 13.633 | 12.466 | 12.933 | 12.100 | 12.366 | 75.598 |
| 18 | (Finland) Marcus Pietarinen | 13.200 | 13.166 | 12.833 | 12.066 | 11.600 | 12.100 | 74.965 |
| 19 | (United States) Kai Uemura | 12.866 | 11.633 | 12.633 | 13.633 | 12.133 | 11.933 | 74.831 |
| 20 | (Turkey) Volkan Arda Hamarat | 12.600 | 10.433 | 12.900 | 13.300 | 13.166 | 12.300 | 74.699 |
| 21 | (Canada) Xavier Olasz | 11.466 | 12.633 | 12.233 | 13.300 | 12.766 | 12.266 | 74.664 |
| 22 | (Hungary) Zala Samu Zambori | 12.333 | 11.400 | 12.633 | 12.966 | 12.400 | 12.666 | 74.398 |
| 23 | (Egypt) Mostafa Ahmed | 11.833 | 11.766 | 12.700 | 12.500 | 12.633 | 12.500 | 73.932 |
| 24 | (Brazil) João Victor Perdigão | 12.933 | 10.100 | 12.333 | 13.566 | 10.166 | 8.833 | 67.931 |

=== Floor exercise ===
| Rank | Gymnast | D Score | E Score | Pen. | Total |
|---|---|---|---|---|---|
| 1st place, gold medalist(s) | (Colombia) Ángel Barajas | 5.100 | 8.800 | | 13.900 |
| 2nd place, silver medalist(s) | (Germany) Timo Eder | 4.800 | 8.700 | | 13.500 |
| 3rd place, bronze medalist(s) | (Italy) Tommaso Brugnami | 5.100 | 8.233 | | 13.333 |
| 4 | (France) Anthony Mansard | 4.900 | 8.300 | | 13.200 |
| 5 | (Japan) Masaharu Tanida | 5.000 | 8.400 | 0.300 | 13.100 |
| 6 | (China) Yang Chunjie | 4.300 | 8.633 | | 12.933 |
| 7 | (Japan) Tomoharu Tsunogai | 4.900 | 8.200 | 0.300 | 12.800 |
| 8 | (Germany) Maxim Kovalenko | 5.000 | 7.333 | | 12.333 |

=== Pommel horse ===
| Rank | Gymnast | D Score | E Score | Pen. | Total |
|---|---|---|---|---|---|
| 1st place, gold medalist(s) | (Armenia) Hamlet Manukyan | 5.500 | 9.133 | | 14.633 |
| 2nd place, silver medalist(s) | (Armenia) Mamikon Khachatryan | 5.400 | 8.700 | | 14.100 |
| 3rd place, bronze medalist(s) | (Kazakhstan) Zeinolla Idrissov | 5.500 | 8.566 | | 14.066 |
| 4 | (United Kingdom) Alexander Yolshin-Cash | 5.100 | 8.500 | | 13.600 |
| 5 | (Egypt) Mostafa Ahmed | 4.400 | 8.900 | | 13.300 |
| 6 | (China) He Xiang | 4.900 | 7.866 | | 12.766 |
| 7 | (China) Yang Chunjie | 4.900 | 7.766 | | 12.666 |
| 8 | (France) Manoah Felicite | 5.000 | 5.000 | | 10.000 |

=== Still rings ===
| Rank | Gymnast | D Score | E Score | Pen. | Total |
|---|---|---|---|---|---|
| 1st place, gold medalist(s) | (Armenia) Hamlet Manukyan | 4.400 | 9.231 | | 13.633 |
| 2nd place, silver medalist(s) | (Japan) Masaharu Tanida | 4.700 | 8.766 | | 13.466 |
| 3rd place, bronze medalist(s) | (Italy) Riccardo Villa | 4.400 | 9.033 | | 13.433 |
| 4 | (Armenia) Erik Baghdasaryan | 4.200 | 9.200 | | 13.400 |
| 5 | (Japan) Tomoharu Tsunogai | 4.200 | 8.900 | | 13.100 |
| 6 | (China) Yang Chunjie | 4.400 | 8.566 | | 12.966 |
| 7 | (Finland) Marcus Pietarinen | 4.100 | 8.833 | | 12.933 |
| 8 | (United States) Kai Uemura | 4.400 | 8.033 | | 12.433 |

=== Vault ===
| Rank | Gymnast | Vault 1 | | | | Vault 2 | | | | Total |
| Rank | Gymnast | D Score | E Score | Pen. | Score 1 | D Score | E Score | Pen. | Score 2 | Total |
|---|---|---|---|---|---|---|---|---|---|---|
| 1st place, gold medalist(s) | (Italy) Tommaso Brugnami | 5.200 | 9.300 | 0.100 | 14.400 | 4.800 | 9.066 | | 13.866 | 14.133 |
| 2nd place, silver medalist(s) | (Canada) Victor Canuel | 4.800 | 9.233 | | 14.033 | 4.800 | 9.200 | | 14.000 | 14.016 |
| 3rd place, bronze medalist(s) | (Hungary) Szilard Zavory | 5.200 | 8.900 | 0.100 | 14.000 | 4.800 | 8.966 | | 13.766 | 13.883 |
| 4 | (Germany) Maxim Kovalenko | 4.800 | 9.166 | | 13.966 | 4.800 | 8.900 | | 13.700 | 13.833 |
| 5 | (Turkey) Alperen Ege Avci | 4.800 | 9.100 | | 13.900 | 4.000 | 9.266 | | 13.266 | 13.583 |
| 6 | (Bulgaria) Daniel Trifonov | 4.800 | 7.900 | 0.100 | 12.600 | 4.800 | 9.033 | 0.100 | 13.733 | 13.166 |
| 7 | (Norway) Jakob Kvamsøe | 4.800 | 8.700 | | 13.500 | 4.000 | 8.800 | | 12.800 | 13.150 |
| 8 | (Japan) Haruto Kamiyama | 5.600 | 8.733 | | 14.333 | 2.400 | 7.366 | | 9.766 | 12.049 |

=== Parallel bars ===
| Rank | Gymnast | D Score | E Score | Pen. | Total |
|---|---|---|---|---|---|
| 1st place, gold medalist(s) | (Colombia) Ángel Barajas | 5.300 | 8.433 | | 13.733 |
| 1st place, gold medalist(s) | (Japan) Tomoharu Tsunogai | 4.900 | 8.833 | | 13.733 |
| 3rd place, bronze medalist(s) | (Egypt) Yahia Zakaria | 4.700 | 9.000 | | 13.700 |
| 4 | (Armenia) Erik Baghdasaryan | 4.600 | 9.033 | | 13.633 |
| 4 | (Japan) Masaharu Tanida | 5.100 | 8.533 | | 13.633 |
| 6 | (United Kingdom) Winston Powell | 4.500 | 9.100 | | 13.600 |
| 7 | (China) Qin Guohuan | 4.800 | 8.100 | | 12.900 |
| 8 | (China) Yang Chunjie | 4.500 | 7.733 | | 12.233 |

=== Horizontal bar ===
| Rank | Gymnast | D Score | E Score | Pen. | Total |
|---|---|---|---|---|---|
| 1st place, gold medalist(s) | (Japan) Tomoharu Tsunogai | 5.100 | 8.566 | | 13.666 |
| 2nd place, silver medalist(s) | (China) He Xiang | 5.100 | 8.533 | | 13.633 |
| 3rd place, bronze medalist(s) | (Colombia) Ángel Barajas | 5.700 | 7.733 | | 13.433 |
| 4 | (France) Anthony Mansard | 4.700 | 8.500 | | 13.200 |
| 5 | (Italy) Riccardo Villa | 4.700 | 8.266 | | 12.966 |
| 6 | (United Kingdom) Winston Powell | 4.400 | 8.500 | | 12.900 |
| 7 | (Hungary) Zala Samu Zambori | 4.500 | 8.366 | | 12.866 |
| 8 | (Japan) Masaharu Tanida | 3.800 | 6.400 | | 10.200 |

== Women's results ==
=== Team ===
| Rank | Team | Vault (gymnastics) | Uneven bars | Balance beam | Floor (gymnastics) | Total |
|---|---|---|---|---|---|---|
| 1st place, gold medalist(s) | Japan | 27.432 (2) | 25.666 (2) | 25.133 (2) | 25.999 (1) | 104.230 |
| 1st place, gold medalist(s) | Mika Mizuno | 13.766 | 9.433 | 10.200 | 13.166 | 104.230 |
| 1st place, gold medalist(s) | Haruka Nakamura | 12.966 | 12.800 | 11.800 | 12.833 | 104.230 |
| 1st place, gold medalist(s) | Sara Yamaguchi | 13.666 | 12.866 | 13.333 | 12.200 | 104.230 |
| 2nd place, silver medalist(s) | United States | 27.600 (1) | 25.299 (3) | 23.400 (13) | 25.899 (2) | 102.198 |
| 2nd place, silver medalist(s) | Jayla Hang | 13.800 | 12.266 | 8.733 | 12.766 | 102.198 |
| 2nd place, silver medalist(s) | Hezly Rivera | 0.000 | 13.033 | 12.000 | 13.133 | 102.198 |
| 2nd place, silver medalist(s) | Izzy Stassi | 13.800 | 11.966 | 11.400 | 12.666 | 102.198 |
| 3rd place, bronze medalist(s) | Italy | 26.832 (3) | 26.399 (1) | 23.599 (10) | 25.166 (4) | 101.996 |
| 3rd place, bronze medalist(s) | Caterina Gaddi | 13.166 | 13.366 | 10.833 | 12.433 | 101.996 |
| 3rd place, bronze medalist(s) | July Marano | 13.666 | 12.600 | 10.333 | 12.433 | 101.996 |
| 3rd place, bronze medalist(s) | Giulia Perotti | 13.066 | 13.033 | 12.766 | 12.733 | 101.996 |
| 4 | Canada | 26.733 (5) | 23.599 (12) | 25.033 (3) | 24.966 (5) | 100.331 |
| 4 | Cristella Brunetti-Burns | 13.200 | 10.200 | 12.700 | 11.666 | 100.331 |
| 4 | Victoriane Charron | 13.500 | 12.333 | 9.800 | 12.566 | 100.331 |
| 4 | Zoe Tsaprailis | 13.233 | 11.266 | 12.333 | 12.400 | 100.331 |
| 5 | Argentina | 26.799 (4) | 24.699 (5) | 23.432 (12) | 24.433 (9) | 99.363 |
| 5 | Emilia Acosta | 12.266 | 10.833 | 12.266 | 12.000 | 99.363 |
| 5 | Isabella Ajalla | 13.133 | 12.266 | 11.166 | 10.900 | 99.363 |
| 5 | Mia Mainardi | 13.666 | 12.433 | 10.366 | 12.433 | 99.363 |
| 6 | China | 25.766 (7) | 23.966 (8) | 24.766 (4) | 23.733 (15) | 98.231 |
| 6 | Jiang Shuxuan | 12.966 | 11.500 | 11.666 | 12.400 | 98.231 |
| 6 | Qin Xinyi | 12.800 | 12.100 | 11.066 | 10.566 | 98.231 |
| 6 | Yu Hanyue | 0.000 | 11.866 | 13.100 | 11.333 | 98.231 |
| 7 | Germany | 24.432 (20) | 25.299 (3) | 24.599 (5) | 23.699 (18) | 98.029 |
| 7 | Marlene Gotthardt | 12.266 | 12.233 | 13.033 | 11.966 | 98.029 |
| 7 | Helen Kevric | 10.600 | 13.066 | 9.966 | 11.733 | 98.029 |
| 7 | Silja Stöhr | 12.166 | 12.200 | 11.566 | 10.566 | 98.029 |
| 8 | Romania | 25.400 (10) | 22.766 (15) | 25.232 (1) | 24.566 (8) | 97.964 |
| 8 | Crina Tudor | 12.700 | 11.466 | 11.600 | 12.266 | 97.964 |
| 8 | Gabriela Vănoagă | 12.700 | 11.300 | 12.866 | 12.300 | 97.964 |
| 8 | Anamaria Mihaescu | 11.933 | 11.133 | 12.366 | 12.066 | 97.964 |

=== Individual all-around ===
| Rank | Gymnast | Vault (gymnastics) | Uneven bars | Balance beam | Floor (gymnastics) | Total |
|---|---|---|---|---|---|---|
| 1st place, gold medalist(s) | (Japan) Haruka Nakamura | 12.800 | 12.833 | 13.266 | 12.866 | 51.765 |
| 2nd place, silver medalist(s) | (Japan) Sara Yamaguchi | 12.233 | 12.900 | 13.333 | 13.066 | 51.532 |
| 3rd place, bronze medalist(s) | (Italy) Caterina Gaddi | 13.000 | 13.366 | 11.900 | 12.633 | 50.899 |
| 4 | (United States) Jayla Hang | 13.966 | 13.133 | 12.300 | 11.433 | 50.832 |
| 5 | (United Kingdom) Abigail Martin | 13.133 | 12.233 | 12.600 | 12.300 | 50.266 |
| 6 | (Germany) Marlene Gotthardt | 12.833 | 12.366 | 12.933 | 12.000 | 50.132 |
| 7 | (Italy) Giulia Perotti | 13.166 | 11.100 | 12.766 | 12.900 | 49.932 |
| 8 | (Canada) Victoriane Charron | 12.866 | 12.300 | 11.700 | 12.233 | 49.099 |
| 9 | (Spain) Leire Escauriaza | 12.600 | 12.566 | 11.733 | 12.133 | 49.032 |
| 10 | (France) Lilou Viallat | 12.900 | 11.933 | 11.733 | 12.133 | 48.965 |
| 11 | (Belgium) Yelena Devreker | 12.766 | 12.300 | 12.233 | 11.366 | 48.665 |
| 12 | (Argentina) Mia Mainardi | 13.600 | 12.133 | 11.033 | 11.766 | 48.532 |
| 13 | (China) Jiang Shuxuan | 13.066 | 11.566 | 10.633 | 13.166 | 48.431 |
| 14 | (France) Lana Pondart | 12.700 | 11.233 | 11.966 | 12.366 | 48.265 |
| 15 | (Argentina) Isabella Ajalla | 12.866 | 12.300 | 10.900 | 12.033 | 48.099 |
| 16 | (Canada) Zoe Tsaprailis | 12.866 | 11.600 | 11.233 | 12.300 | 47.999 |
| 17 | (Romania) Gabriela Vănoagă | 12.600 | 11.466 | 11.366 | 12.433 | 47.865 |
| 18 | (Ukraine) Anastasiia Zubkova | 12.366 | 12.666 | 11.266 | 11.100 | 47.398 |
| 19 | (Czech Republic) Vanesa Masova | 13.166 | 12.666 | 11.266 | 11.100 | 47.331 |
| 20 | (Brazil) Luiza Abel | 12.766 | 11.500 | 10.500 | 10.866 | 45.632 |
| 21 | (Romania) Crina Tudor | 12.666 | 9.000 | 11.966 | 11.833 | 45.465 |
| 22 | (United Kingdom) Jemima Taylor | 11.533 | 9.933 | 10.200 | 11.933 | 43.599 |
| 23 | (Belgium) Hanne Degryse | 11.566 | 9.233 | 10.666 | 12.100 | 42.932 |
| 24 | (Chinese Taipei) Yang Ko-wen | 12.033 | 7.833 | 11.633 | 10.700 | 42.199 |

=== Vault ===
| Rank | Gymnast | Vault 1 | | | | Vault 2 | | | | Total |
| Rank | Gymnast | D Score | E Score | Pen. | Score 1 | D Score | E Score | Pen. | Score 2 | Total |
|---|---|---|---|---|---|---|---|---|---|---|
| 1st place, gold medalist(s) | (Argentina) Mia Mainardi | 4.600 | 9.033 | | 13.633 | 4.200 | 8.933 | | 13.133 | 13.383 |
| 2nd place, silver medalist(s) | (Italy) July Marano | 4.600 | 8.900 | 0.100 | 13.400 | 4.200 | 8.933 | | 13.133 | 13.266 |
| 3rd place, bronze medalist(s) | (France) Ming van Eijken | 4.400 | 8.700 | | 13.100 | 4.000 | 8.900 | | 12.900 | 13.000 |
| 4 | (Canada) Zoe Tsaprailis | 4.200 | 9.066 | | 13.266 | 3.600 | 9.066 | | 12.666 | 12.966 |
| 5 | (United Kingdom) Abigail Martin | 4.600 | 8.466 | 0.300 | 12.766 | 4.200 | 8.733 | | 12.933 | 12.849 |
| 6 | (United States) Jayla Hang | 4.200 | 7.600 | 0.100 | 11.700 | 5.000 | 8.966 | | 13.966 | 12.833 |
| 7 | (Canada) Victoriane Charron | 4.200 | 8.866 | 0.100 | 12.816 | 3.600 | 9.066 | | 12.666 | 12.816 |
| 8 | (Japan) Mika Mizuno | 4.600 | 7.366 | 0.300 | 11.666 | | | | DNS | DNF |

=== Uneven bars ===
| Rank | Gymnast | D Score | E Score | Pen. | Total |
|---|---|---|---|---|---|
| 1st place, gold medalist(s) | (Italy) Caterina Gaddi | 5.700 | 7.900 | | 13.600 |
| 2nd place, silver medalist(s) | (Germany) Helen Kevric | 5.600 | 7.666 | | 13.266 |
| 3rd place, bronze medalist(s) | (Italy) Giulia Perotti | 5.100 | 8.000 | | 13.100 |
| 4 | (Japan) Haruka Nakamura | 5.700 | 6.833 | | 12.533 |
| 5 | (Japan) Sara Yamaguchi | 4.600 | 7.900 | | 12.500 |
| 6 | (Argentina) Mia Mainardi | 4.500 | 7.866 | | 12.366 |
| 7 | (Spain) Leire Escauriaza | 4.700 | 6.733 | | 11.333 |
| 8 | (United States) Hezly Rivera | 3.200 | 6.700 | | 9.900 |

=== Balance beam ===
| Rank | Gymnast | D Score | E Score | Pen. | Total |
|---|---|---|---|---|---|
| 1st place, gold medalist(s) | (China) Yu Hanyue | 5.400 | 7.733 | | 13.133 |
| 2nd place, silver medalist(s) | (Romania) Gabriela Vănoagă | 4.600 | 8.233 | | 12.833 |
| 3rd place, bronze medalist(s) | (Canada) Cristella Brunetti-Burns | 5.200 | 7.400 | | 12.600 |
| 4 | (Japan) Sara Yamaguchi | 5.600 | 6.800 | | 12.400 |
| 5 | (Chinese Taipei) Yang Ko-wen | 4.700 | 7.033 | | 11.733 |
| 6 | (Czech Republic) Vanesa Masova | 5.000 | 6.366 | | 11.366 |
| 7 | (Germany) Marlene Gotthardt | 4.800 | 6.533 | | 11.333 |
| 8 | (Italy) Giulia Perotti | 5.100 | 5.833 | | 10.933 |

=== Floor exercise ===
| Rank | Gymnast | D Score | E Score | Pen. | Total |
|---|---|---|---|---|---|
| 1st place, gold medalist(s) | (Italy) Giulia Perotti | 4.800 | 8.100 | | 12.900 |
| 2nd place, silver medalist(s) | (United States) Hezly Rivera | 5.100 | 7.833 | 0.100 | 12.833 |
| 3rd place, bronze medalist(s) | (Japan) Haruka Nakamura | 5.100 | 7.700 | | 12.800 |
| 4 | (United Kingdom) Abigail Martin | 4.900 | 7.633 | | 12.533 |
| 5 | (United States) Jayla Hang | 4.700 | 7.800 | | 12.500 |
| 6 | (Canada) Victoriane Charron | 4.800 | 7.666 | | 12.466 |
| 7 | (South Korea) Hwang Seo-hyun | 4.700 | 7.700 | | 12.400 |
| 8 | (United Kingdom) Jemima Taylor | 4.600 | 7.000 | | 11.600 |

== Qualification ==
=== Men's results ===
==== All-around ====
| Rank | Gymnast | Floor (gymnastics) | Pommel horse | Rings (gymnastics) | Vault (gymnastics) | Parallel bars | Horizontal bar | Total | Qual. |
|---|---|---|---|---|---|---|---|---|---|
| 1 | (Colombia) Ángel Barajas | 13.633 | 12.933 | 13.066 | 14.400 | 13.966 | 13.466 | 81.464 | Q |
| 2 | (Japan) Tomoharu Tsunogai | 13.733 | 13.100 | 13.333 | 13.700 | 13.900 | 13.600 | 81.366 | Q |
| 3 | (China) Yang Chunjie | 13.300 | 13.866 | 13.233 | 13.033 | 13.800 | 12.733 | 79.965 | Q |
| 4 | (Italy) Tommaso Brugnami | 13.633 | 12.700 | 13.100 | 14.400 | 13.200 | 12.866 | 79.899 | Q |
| 5 | (Japan) Haruto Kamiyama | 13.733 | 13.333 | 13.166 | 14.166 | 13.766 | 11.666 | 79.830 | Q |
| 6 | (China) Qin Guohuan | 12.500 | 13.066 | 13.133 | 14.033 | 14.000 | 12.966 | 79.698 | Q |
| 7 | (United Kingdom) Winston Powell | 13.100 | 13.100 | 12.766 | 13.833 | 13.500 | 13.133 | 79.432 | Q |
| 8 | (China) He Xiang | 13.166 | 13.466 | 13.133 | 13.066 | 13.400 | 13.200 | 79.431 | – |
| 9 | (Italy) Riccardo Villa | 12.933 | 12.400 | 13.600 | 14.233 | 13.000 | 13.233 | 79.399 | Q |
| 10 | (Japan) Masaharu Tanida | 13.800 | 9.633 | 13.400 | 14.500 | 14.333 | 13.633 | 79.299 | – |
| 11 | (France) Anthony Mansard | 13.400 | 12.566 | 13.000 | 14.000 | 12.800 | 13.200 | 78.966 | Q |
| 12 | (Armenia) Erik Baghdasaryan | 12.966 | 12.266 | 13.366 | 13.566 | 13.533 | 12.866 | 78.563 | Q |
| 13 | (United States) Kai Uemura | 12.966 | 12.433 | 13.200 | 13.700 | 13.133 | 13.000 | 78.432 | Q |
| 14 | (Armenia) Hamlet Manukyan | 12.533 | 14.133 | 13.666 | 12.866 | 13.166 | 12.066 | 78.430 | Q |
| 15 | (France) Romain Cavallaro | 12.366 | 12.666 | 12.966 | 13.866 | 13.166 | 12.866 | 77.896 | Q |
| 16 | (United States) David Shamah | 13.200 | 11.933 | 13.066 | 13.333 | 13.366 | 12.933 | 77.831 | Q |
| 17 | (Armenia) Mamikon Khachatryan | 12.700 | 14.000 | 13.000 | 13.133 | 12.800 | 11.866 | 77.499 | – |
| 18 | (Italy) Manuel Berettera | 13.166 | 11.566 | 13.000 | 13.600 | 12.900 | 12.933 | 77.165 | – |
| 19 | (Egypt) Mohamed Attia | 12.833 | 12.933 | 12.666 | 13.066 | 12.800 | 12.800 | 77.098 | Q |
| 20 | (Germany) Timo Eder | 13.333 | 11.000 | 12.733 | 13.700 | 13.300 | 12.966 | 77.032 | Q |
| 21 | (Germany) Maxim Kovalenko | 13.666 | 11.833 | 12.933 | 13.800 | 12.100 | 12.700 | 77.032 | Q |
| 22 | (Austria) Alfred Schwaiger | 12.400 | 13.133 | 12.566 | 13.033 | 12.966 | 12.600 | 76.698 | Q |
| 23 | (Turkey) Volkan Arda Hamarat | 12.900 | 12.100 | 13.100 | 13.166 | 13.133 | 12.266 | 76.665 | Q |
| 24 | (United Kingdom) Alexander Yolshin-Cash | 12.933 | 13.433 | 12.833 | 12.633 | 11.933 | 12.700 | 76.465 | Q |
| 25 | (Brazil) Joao da Silva Perdigao | 13.133 | 12.133 | 12.933 | 13.833 | 12.066 | 12.300 | 76.398 | Q |
| 26 | (Hungary) Zala Samu Zambori | 12.000 | 12.700 | 13.033 | 13.100 | 12.466 | 13.066 | 76.365 | Q |
| 27 | (Finland) Marcus Pietarinen | 12.866 | 13.100 | 13.166 | 12.300 | 13.033 | 11.833 | 76.298 | Q |
| 28 | (Egypt) Mostafa Ahmed | 11.766 | 13.333 | 13.000 | 12.833 | 13.066 | 12.166 | 76.164 | Q |
| 29 | (United States) Kiran Mandava | 10.766 | 12.766 | 13.133 | 13.700 | 13.000 | 12.400 | 75.765 | – |
| 30 | (Canada) Xavier Olasz | 12.700 | 11.600 | 12.700 | 13.400 | 12.833 | 12.433 | 75.666 | R1 |
| 31 | (Mexico) Juan Porras | 13.066 | 11.833 | 12.333 | 13.433 | 12.666 | 12.300 | 75.631 | R2 |
| 32 | (Turkey) Alperen Ege Avci | 12.300 | 11.433 | 12.600 | 14.066 | 12.666 | 12.533 | 75.598 | R3 |
| 33 | (Norway) Jakob Kvamsoee | 12.166 | 11.700 | 12.466 | 14.000 | 12.666 | 12.466 | 75.464 | R4 |

==== Floor exercise ====
| Rank | Gymnast | D Score | E Score | Pen. | Total | Qual. |
|---|---|---|---|---|---|---|
| 1 | (Japan) Masaharu Tanida | 5.200 | 8.600 | | 13.800 | Q |
| 2 | (Japan) Tomoharu Tsunogai | 4.900 | 8.833 | | 13.733 | Q |
| 3 | (Japan) Haruto Kamiyama | 5.100 | 8.633 | | 13.733 | – |
| 4 | (Germany) Maxim Kovalenko | 4.900 | 8.766 | | 13.666 | Q |
| 5 | (Colombia) Ángel Barajas | 5.100 | 8.533 | | 13.633 | Q |
| 5 | (Italy) Tommaso Brugnami | 5.100 | 8.533 | | 13.633 | Q |
| 7 | (France) Anthony Mansard | 4.900 | 8.500 | | 13.400 | Q |
| 8 | (Germany) Timo Eder | 4.800 | 8.533 | | 13.333 | Q |
| 9 | (China) Yang Chunjie | 4.300 | 9.000 | | 13.300 | Q |
| 10 | (Canada) Victor Canuel | 4.700 | 8.600 | | 13.300 | R1 |
| 11 | (United States) David Shamah | 4.900 | 8.300 | | 13.200 | R2 |
| 11 | (China) He Xiang | 4.300 | 8.866 | | 13.166 | R3 |

==== Pommel horse ====
| Rank | Gymnast | D Score | E Score | Pen. | Total | Qual. |
|---|---|---|---|---|---|---|
| 1 | (Armenia) Hamlet Manukyan | 5.400 | 8.733 | | 14.133 | Q |
| 2 | (Lithuania) Kristijonas Padegimas | 5.300 | 8.800 | | 14.100 | – |
| 3 | (Armenia) Mamikon Khachatryan | 5.300 | 8.700 | | 14.000 | Q |
| 4 | (China) Yang Chunjie | 4.700 | 9.166 | | 13.866 | Q |
| 5 | (Kazakhstan) Zeinolla Idrissov | 5.500 | 8.333 | | 13.833 | Q |
| 6 | (China) He Xiang | 4.600 | 8.866 | | 13.466 | Q |
| 7 | (United Kingdom) Alexander Yolshin-Cash | 4.600 | 8.833 | | 13.433 | Q |
| 8 | (France) Manoah Felicite | 4.900 | 8.500 | | 13.400 | Q |
| 9 | (Egypt) Mostafa Ahmed | 4.400 | 8.933 | | 13.333 | Q |
| 10 | (Japan) Haruto Kamiyama | 5.200 | 8.133 | | 13.333 | R1 |
| 11 | (Iran) Ali Asadihafez | 4.300 | 8.833 | | 13.133 | R2 |
| 12 | (Austria) Alfred Schwaiger | 5.000 | 8.133 | | 13.133 | R3 |

==== Still rings ====
| Rank | Gymnast | D Score | E Score | Pen. | Total | Qual. |
|---|---|---|---|---|---|---|
| 1 | (Armenia) Hamlet Manukyan | 4.400 | 9.266 | | 13.666 | Q |
| 2 | (Italy) Riccardo Villa | 4.400 | 9.200 | | 13.600 | Q |
| 3 | (Japan) Masaharu Tanida | 5.000 | 8.400 | | 13.400 | Q |
| 4 | (Armenia) Erik Baghdasaryan | 4.200 | 9.166 | | 13.366 | Q |
| 5 | (Japan) Tomoharu Tsunogai | 4.200 | 9.133 | | 13.333 | Q |
| 6 | (China) Yang Chunjie | 4.400 | 8.833 | | 13.233 | Q |
| 7 | (United States) Kai Uemura | 4.400 | 8.800 | | 13.200 | Q |
| 8 | (Finland) Marcus Pietarinen | 4.100 | 9.066 | | 13.166 | Q |
| 9 | (Spain) Aitor Gómez | 4.400 | 8.766 | | 13.166 | R1 |
| 10 | (Japan) Haruto Kamiyama | 5.100 | 8.066 | | 13.166 | – |
| 11 | (United States) Kiran Mandava | 4.100 | 9.033 | | 13.133 | R2 |
| 12 | (China) Qin Guohuan | 4.200 | 8.933 | | 13.133 | R3 |

==== Vault ====
| Rank | Gymnast | Vault 1 | | | | Vault 2 | | | | Total | Qual. |
| Rank | Gymnast | D Score | E Score | Pen. | Score 1 | D Score | E Score | Pen. | Score 2 | Total | Qual. |
|---|---|---|---|---|---|---|---|---|---|---|---|
| 1 | (Bulgaria) Daniel Trifonov | 4.800 | 9.133 | | 13.933 | 4.800 | 9.200 | | 14.000 | 13.966 | Q |
| 2 | (Italy) Tommaso Brugnami | 5.200 | 9.300 | 0.100 | 14.400 | 4.800 | 8.933 | 0.300 | 13.433 | 13.916 | Q |
| 3 | (Japan) Haruto Kamiyama | 5.600 | 8.866 | 0.300 | 14.166 | 5.600 | 7.600 | | 13.200 | 13.683 | Q |
| 4 | (Hungary) Szilard Zavory | 5.200 | 8.533 | | 13.733 | 4.800 | 9.033 | 0.300 | 13.533 | 13.633 | Q |
| 5 | (Turkey) Alperen Ege Avci | 4.800 | 9.266 | | 14.066 | 4.000 | 9.166 | | 13.166 | 13.616 | Q |
| 6 | (Canada) Victor Canuel | 4.800 | 9.133 | | 13.933 | 4.800 | 8.800 | | 13.300 | 13.616 | Q |
| 7 | (Germany) Maxim Kovalenko | 4.800 | 9.000 | | 13.800 | 4.800 | 8.833 | | 13.333 | 13.566 | Q |
| 8 | (Norway) Jakob Kvamsøe | 4.800 | 9.200 | | 14.000 | 4.000 | 9.066 | | 13.066 | 13.533 | Q |
| 9 | (Romania) Iustin Mihai | 4.800 | 9.000 | | 13.800 | 4.000 | 9.233 | | 13.233 | 13.516 | R1 |
| 10 | (United Kingdom) Winston Powell | 4.800 | 9.033 | | 13.833 | 4.000 | 9.100 | | 13.100 | 13.466 | R2 |
| 11 | (Brazil) João Victor Perdigão | 4.800 | 9.033 | | 13.833 | 5.200 | 7.700 | | 12.900 | 13.366 | R3 |

==== Parallel bars ====
| Rank | Gymnast | D Score | E Score | Pen. | Total | Qual. |
|---|---|---|---|---|---|---|
| 1 | (Japan) Masaharu Tanida | 5.100 | 9.233 | | 14.333 | Q |
| 2 | (China) Qin Guohuan | 4.800 | 9.200 | | 14.000 | Q |
| 3 | (Colombia) Ángel Barajas | 5.300 | 8.666 | | 13.966 | Q |
| 4 | (Japan) Tomoharu Tsunogai | 4.900 | 9.000 | | 13.900 | Q |
| 5 | (China) Yang Chunjie | 4.900 | 8.900 | | 13.800 | Q |
| 6 | (Japan) Haruto Kamiyama | 5.100 | 8.666 | | 13.766 | – |
| 7 | (Egypt) Yahia Zakaria | 4.700 | 8.866 | | 13.566 | Q |
| 8 | (Armenia) Erik Baghdasaryan | 4.300 | 9.233 | | 13.533 | Q |
| 9 | (United Kingdom) Winston Powell | 4.500 | 9.000 | | 13.500 | Q |
| 10 | (China) He Xiang | 4.400 | 9.000 | | 13.400 | – |
| 11 | (United States) David Shamah | 5.200 | 8.166 | | 13.366 | R1 |
| 12 | (Germany) Timo Eder | 4.200 | 9.100 | | 13.300 | R2 |
| 13 | (Italy) Tommaso Brugnami | 4.100 | 9.100 | | 13.200 | R3 |

==== Horizontal bar ====
| Rank | Gymnast | D Score | E Score | Pen. | Total | Qual. |
|---|---|---|---|---|---|---|
| 1 | (Japan) Masaharu Tanida | 4.800 | 8.833 | | 13.633 | Q |
| 2 | (Japan) Tomoharu Tsunogai | 4.900 | 8.700 | | 13.600 | Q |
| 3 | (Colombia) Ángel Barajas | 5.900 | 7.866 | 0.300 | 13.466 | Q |
| 4 | (Italy) Riccardo Villa | 4.700 | 8.533 | | 13.233 | Q |
| 5 | (France) Anthony Mansard | 4.700 | 8.500 | | 13.200 | Q |
| 6 | (China) He Xiang | 4.800 | 8.400 | | 13.200 | Q |
| 7 | (United Kingdom) Winston Powell | 4.400 | 8.733 | | 13.133 | Q |
| 8 | (Hungary) Zala Samu Zambori | 4.600 | 8.466 | | 13.066 | Q |
| 9 | (United States) Kai Uemura | 4.600 | 8.400 | | 13.000 | R1 |
| 10 | (Germany) Timo Eder | 4.300 | 8.666 | | 12.966 | R2 |
| 11 | (China) Qin Guohuan | 4.400 | 8.566 | | 12.966 | R3 |

=== Women's results ===
==== All-around ====
| Rank | Gymnast | Vault (gymnastics) | Uneven bars | Balance beam | Floor (gymnastics) | Total | Qual. |
|---|---|---|---|---|---|---|---|
| 1 | (Japan) Sara Yamaguchi | 13.666 | 12.866 | 13.333 | 12.200 | 52.065 | Q |
| 2 | (Italy) Giulia Perotti | 13.066 | 13.033 | 12.766 | 12.733 | 51.598 | Q |
| 3 | (Japan) Haruka Nakamura | 12.966 | 12.800 | 11.800 | 12.833 | 50.399 | Q |
| 4 | (United States) Izzy Stassi | 13.800 | 11.966 | 11.400 | 12.666 | 49.832 | Q |
| 5 | (Italy) Caterina Gaddi | 13.166 | 13.366 | 10.833 | 12.433 | 49.798 | Q |
| 6 | (Germany) Marlene Gotthardt | 12.266 | 12.233 | 13.033 | 11.966 | 49.498 | Q |
| 7 | (Spain) Leire Escauriaza | 13.000 | 12.600 | 11.833 | 12.000 | 49.433 | Q |
| 8 | (Canada) Zoe Tsaprailis | 13.233 | 11.266 | 12.333 | 12.400 | 49.232 | Q |
| 9 | (Czech Republic) Vanesa Masova | 13.466 | 12.266 | 12.533 | 10.966 | 49.231 | Q |
| 10 | (Romania) Gabriela Vănoagă | 12.700 | 11.300 | 12.866 | 12.300 | 49.166 | Q |
| 11 | (United Kingdom) Abigail Martin | 12.666 | 12.233 | 11.666 | 12.566 | 49.131 | Q |
| 12 | (Italy) July Marano | 13.666 | 12.600 | 10.333 | 12.433 | 49.032 | – |
| 13 | (Argentina) Mia Mainardi | 13.666 | 12.433 | 10.366 | 12.433 | 48.898 | Q |
| 14 | (Belgium) Yelena Devreker | 12.933 | 11.966 | 11.933 | 11.900 | 48.732 | Q |
| 15 | (Brazil) Luiza Abel | 13.166 | 11.566 | 11.933 | 12.033 | 48.698 | Q |
| 16 | (China) Jiang Shuxuan | 12.966 | 11.500 | 11.666 | 12.400 | 48.532 | Q |
| 17 | (France) Lana Pondart | 12.700 | 11.300 | 12.300 | 12.133 | 48.433 | Q |
| 18 | (Canada) Victoriane Charron | 13.500 | 12.333 | 9.800 | 12.566 | 48.199 | Q |
| 19 | (United Kingdom) Jemima Taylor | 11.666 | 11.533 | 12.200 | 12.733 | 48.132 | Q |
| 20 | (Romania) Crina Tudor | 12.700 | 11.466 | 11.600 | 12.266 | 48.032 | Q |
| 21 | (France) Lilou Viallat | 12.866 | 10.766 | 11.700 | 12.500 | 47.832 | Q |
| 22 | (Canada) Cristella Brunetti-Burns | 13.200 | 10.200 | 12.700 | 11.666 | 47.766 | – |
| 23 | (Ukraine) Anastasiia Zubkova | 12.833 | 11.900 | 10.866 | 12.033 | 47.632 | Q |
| 24 | (United States) Jayla Hang | 13.800 | 12.266 | 8.733 | 12.766 | 47.565 | Q |
| 25 | (Romania) Anamaria Mihaescu | 11.933 | 11.133 | 12.366 | 12.066 | 47.498 | – |
| 26 | (Argentina) Isabella Ajalla | 13.133 | 12.266 | 11.166 | 10.900 | 47.465 | Q |
| 27 | (Belgium) Hanne Degryse | 12.300 | 12.066 | 10.466 | 12.533 | 47.365 | Q |
| 28 | (Argentina) Emilia Acosta | 12.266 | 10.833 | 12.266 | 12.000 | 47.365 | – |
| 29 | (Chinese Taipei) Yang Ko-wen | 12.200 | 11.633 | 12.600 | 10.866 | 47.299 | R1 |
| 30 | (Jamaica) Isabelle David | 13.233 | 10.500 | 11.733 | 11.800 | 47.266 | R2 |
| 31 | (South Korea) Hwang Seohyun | 11.933 | 10.500 | 11.766 | 12.700 | 46.899 | R3 |
| 32 | (Brazil) Gabriela Boucas | 11.933 | 10.866 | 11.900 | 12.133 | 46.832 | R4 |

==== Vault ====
| Rank | Gymnast | Vault 1 | | | | Vault 2 | | | | Total | Qual. |
| Rank | Gymnast | D Score | E Score | Pen. | Score 1 | D Score | E Score | Pen. | Score 2 | Total | Qual. |
|---|---|---|---|---|---|---|---|---|---|---|---|
| 1 | (United States) Izzy Stassi | 4.600 | 9.200 | | 13.800 | 4.200 | 9.133 | | 13.333 | 13.566 | Q |
| 2 | (United States) Jayla Hang | 5.000 | 8.900 | 0.100 | 13.800 | 4.200 | 9.066 | | 13.266 | 13.533 | Q |
| 3 | (Argentina) Mia Mainardi | 4.600 | 9.066 | | 13.666 | 4.200 | 9.033 | | 13.233 | 13.449 | Q |
| 3 | (Italy) July Marano | 4.600 | 9.066 | | 13.666 | 4.200 | 9.033 | | 13.233 | 13.449 | Q |
| 5 | (Japan) Mika Mizuno | 5.000 | 8.766 | | 13.766 | 4.400 | 8.700 | | 13.100 | 13.433 | Q |
| 6 | (France) Ming van Eijken | 4.400 | 8.666 | | 13.066 | 4.000 | 9.100 | | 13.100 | 13.083 | Q |
| 7 | (Canada) Victoriane Charron | 4.200 | 9.300 | | 13.500 | 3.600 | 8.966 | | 12.566 | 13.033 | Q |
| 8 | (Canada) Zoe Tsaprailis | 4.200 | 9.033 | | 13.233 | 3.600 | 9.200 | | 12.800 | 13.016 | Q |
| 9 | (United Kingdom) Abigail Martin | 4.200 | 8.566 | 0.100 | 12.666 | 4.600 | 8.700 | | 13.300 | 12.983 | R1 |
| 10 | (Jamaica) Isabelle David | 3.800 | 9.433 | | 13.233 | 3.600 | 9.166 | 0.100 | 12.666 | 12.949 | R2 |
| 11 | (Canada) Cristella Brunetti-Burns | 4.200 | 9.000 | | 13.200 | 3.600 | 9.000 | | 12.600 | 12.900 | – |
| 12 | (Brazil) Luiza Abel | 4.200 | 8.966 | | 13.166 | 3.600 | 8.666 | | 12.266 | 12.716 | R3 |

==== Uneven bars ====
| Rank | Gymnast | D Score | E Score | Pen. | Total | Qual. |
|---|---|---|---|---|---|---|
| 1 | (Italy) Caterina Gaddi | 5.600 | 7.766 | | 13.366 | Q |
| 2 | (Germany) Helen Kevric | 5.400 | 7.666 | | 13.066 | Q |
| 3 | (Italy) Giulia Perotti | 5.300 | 7.733 | | 13.033 | Q |
| 3 | (United States) Hezly Rivera | 5.300 | 7.733 | | 13.033 | Q |
| 5 | (Japan) Sara Yamaguchi | 4.700 | 8.166 | | 12.866 | Q |
| 6 | (Japan) Haruka Nakamura | 5.400 | 7.400 | | 12.800 | Q |
| 7 | (Spain) Leire Escauriaza | 4.800 | 7.800 | | 12.600 | Q |
| 8 | (Italy) July Marano | 5.000 | 7.600 | | 12.600 | – |
| 9 | (Argentina) Mia Mainardi | 4.500 | 7.933 | | 12.433 | Q |
| 10 | (Canada) Victoriane Charron | 4.500 | 7.833 | | 12.333 | R1 |
| 11 | (Argentina) Isabella Ajalla | 4.800 | 7.466 | | 12.266 | R2 |
| 11 | (United States) Jayla Hang | 5.100 | 7.166 | | 12.266 | R3 |

==== Balance beam ====
| Rank | Gymnast | D Score | E Score | Pen. | Total | Qual. |
|---|---|---|---|---|---|---|
| 1 | (Japan) Sara Yamaguchi | 5.200 | 8.133 | | 13.333 | Q |
| 2 | (China) Yu Hanyue | 5.400 | 7.700 | | 13.100 | Q |
| 3 | (Germany) Marlene Gotthardt | 4.800 | 8.233 | | 13.033 | Q |
| 4 | (Romania) Gabriela Vănoagă | 4.600 | 8.266 | | 12.866 | Q |
| 5 | (Italy) Giulia Perotti | 5.100 | 7.666 | | 12.766 | Q |
| 6 | (Canada) Cristella Brunetti-Burns | 5.100 | 7.600 | | 12.700 | Q |
| 7 | (Chinese Taipei) Yang Ko-wen | 4.800 | 7.800 | | 12.600 | Q |
| 8 | (Czech Republic) Vanesa Masova | 5.000 | 7.533 | | 12.533 | Q |
| 9 | (Romania) Anamaria Mihaescu | 4.800 | 7.566 | | 12.366 | R1 |
| 10 | (Canada) Zoe Tsaprailis | 4.600 | 7.733 | | 12.333 | R2 |
| 11 | (France) Lana Pondart | 4.600 | 7.700 | | 12.300 | R3 |

==== Floor exercise ====
| Rank | Gymnast | D Score | E Score | Pen. | Total | Qual. |
|---|---|---|---|---|---|---|
| 1 | (Japan) Mika Mizuno | 5.100 | 8.066 | | 13.166 | Q |
| 2 | (United States) Hezly Rivera | 5.200 | 7.933 | | 13.133 | Q |
| 3 | (Japan) Haruka Nakamura | 5.100 | 7.733 | | 12.833 | Q |
| 4 | (United States) Jayla Hang | 4.700 | 8.066 | | 12.766 | Q |
| 5 | (United Kingdom) Jemima Taylor | 4.500 | 8.233 | | 12.733 | Q |
| 6 | (Italy) Giulia Perotti | 4.800 | 7.933 | | 12.733 | Q |
| 7 | (South Korea) Hwang Seohyun | 4.900 | 7.800 | | 12.700 | Q |
| 8 | (United States) Izzy Stassi | 4.900 | 7.766 | | 12.666 | – |
| 9 | (Canada) Victoriane Charron | 4.800 | 7.766 | | 12.566 | Q |
| 10 | (United Kingdom) Abigail Martin | 4.900 | 7.666 | | 12.566 | R1 |
| 11 | (Belgium) Hanne Degryse | 4.300 | 8.233 | | 12.533 | R2 |
| 12 | (France) Lilou Viallat | 4.300 | 8.200 | | 12.500 | R3 |

== Qualifiers ==
The top 36 national federations based on the results of the All-Around qualification from the 1st Junior World Championships in 2019 have qualified a full team (2-3 competitors). All other federations were allowed to send one male and/or one female gymnast to compete.

=== MAG ===
- Algeria
- Argentina
- Armenia
- Australia
- Austria
- Azerbaijan
- Bangladesh
- Brazil
- Bulgaria
- Canada
- China
- Chinese Taipei
- Colombia
- Costa Rica
- Croatia
- Cyprus
- Czech Republic
- Denmark
- Ecuador
- Egypt
- El Salvador
- Finland
- France
- Georgia
- Germany
- Great Britain
- Greece
- Hungary
- Iran
- Israel
- Italy
- Jamaica
- Japan
- Jordan
- Kazakhstan
- Latvia
- Lithuania
- Luxembourg
- Mexico
- Netherlands
- New Zealand
- Nicaragua
- Norway
- Peru
- Poland
- Puerto Rico
- Romania
- Singapore
- Slovakia
- Slovenia
- South Africa
- South Korea
- Spain
- Sweden
- Syria
- Turkey
- Ukraine
- United States
- Uzbekistan
- Vietnam

=== WAG ===
- Argentina
- Armenia
- Azerbaijan
- Belgium
- Brazil
- Bulgaria
- Canada
- China
- Chinese Taipei
- Colombia
- Costa Rica
- Croatia
- Cyprus
- Czech Republic
- Denmark
- Ecuador
- Egypt
- Finland
- France
- Georgia
- Germany
- Great Britain
- Greece
- Guatemala
- Honduras
- Hong Kong
- Hungary
- Israel
- Italy
- Jamaica
- Japan
- Jordan
- Kazakhstan
- Latvia
- Mexico
- Mongolia
- Netherlands
- New Zealand
- Norway
- Panama
- Peru
- Poland
- Portugal
- Puerto Rico
- Romania
- Singapore
- Slovenia
- South Africa
- South Korea
- Spain
- Syria
- Turkey
- Ukraine
- United States
- Uzbekistan
- Venezuela
