= Anna Lashchevska =

Ukrainian artistic gymnast

Anna Lashchevska Анна Лащевська
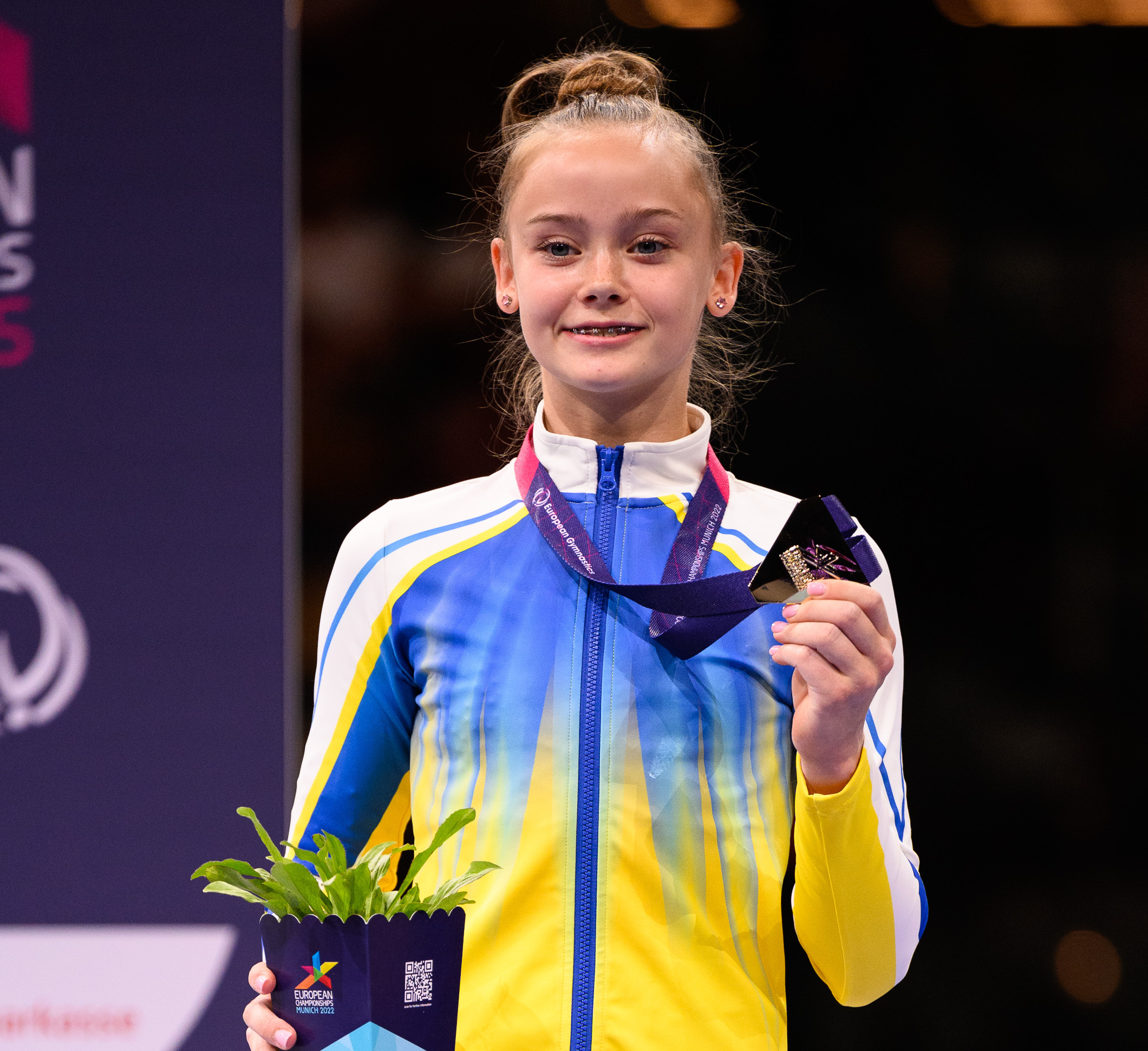
- Lashchevska at the 2022 European Championships

Personal information
- Full name: Anna Viktorivna Lashchevska
- Born: 20 November 2007 (age 18) Ivano-Frankivsk, Ukraine

Gymnastics career
- Discipline: Women's artistic gymnastics
- Country represented: Ukraine (2022–present)
- Club: Osvita
- Head coaches: Iryna Melnychuk, Iuliia Kaiukova
Medal record
Representing Ukraine
FIG World Cup
Event	1st	2nd	3rd
Apparatus World Cup	2	1	1
World Challenge Cup	4	1	0
Total	6	2	1

Anna Viktorivna Lashchevska (Ukrainian: Анна Вікторівна Лащевська; born 20 November 2007) is a Ukrainian artistic gymnast. She is the 2022 Junior European Champion on the balance beam. She represented Ukraine at the 2024 Summer Olympics.

== Early life ==
Lashchevska was born in Ivano-Frankivsk, Ukraine, on 20 November 2007.

== Gymnastics career ==
Lashchevska swept the gold medals at the 2020 Ukrainian Youth Championships in the espoir division.

=== 2022 ===
Lashchevska competed with the German club Lüneburg-Buchholz throughout the 2022 season as a guest. At the 1st Bundesliga, she helped the club finish sixth. She competed with Meaux Gymnastique at the Top 12 Finals in France, helping the club win the bronze medal. At the German Junior Championships, she won gold medals on the uneven bars, balance beam, and floor exercise. She helped Lüneburg-Buchholz repeat their sixth-place finish at the 2nd Bundesliga.

Lashchevska competed at the European Youth Olympic Festival where she helped Ukraine finish fifth as a team. Individually, she won the silver medal on the balance beam behind Romania's Amalia Puflea. Additionally, she competed in the mixed pairs event alongside Radomyr Stelmakh; they finished third behind the Italy pair of Riccardo Villa and Arianna Grillo and the German pair of Jukka Ole Nissinen and Helen Kevric. She then competed at the Junior European Championships where she won gold on balance beam ahead of Grillo and Puflea.

=== 2023 ===
Lashchevska became age-eligible for senior competition in 2023. At the Doha World Cup, she won gold on uneven bars and silver on the balance beam. Then at the Baku World Cup, she won the bronze medal on balance beam. At the European Championships, she finished 32nd in the all-around during the qualification round.

Lashchevska won gold medals on the uneven bars and balance beam at the Mersin World Challenge Cup. Then at the Szombathely World Challenge Cup, she won the balance beam gold medal. She then competed at the 2023 World Championships in Antwerp. She finished 38th all-around in qualifications. Although she did not qualify for the all-around final, she qualified as an individual to the 2024 Olympic Games.

=== 2024 ===
In early 2024 Lashchevska competed at the Osijek Challenge Cup and Doha World Cup, winning gold on balance beam at both. At the 2024 Olympic Games Lashchevska finished forty-ninth during qualifications and did not advance to any finals.

== Competitive history ==
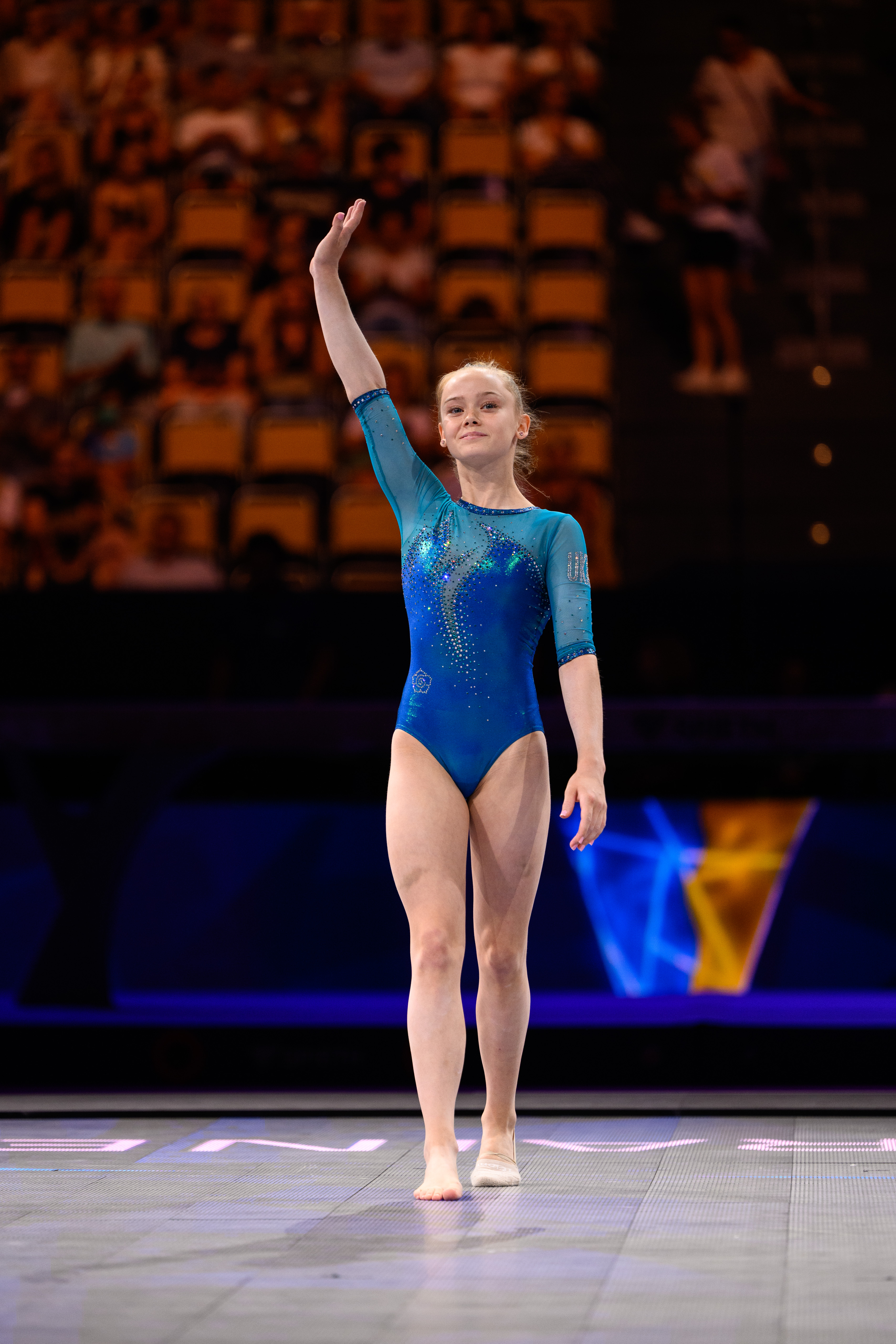
Lashchevska at the 2022 European Championships

Year	Event	Team	AA	VT	UB	BB	FX
Espoir
2020	Ukrainian Youth Championships		1st place, gold medalist(s)	1st place, gold medalist(s)	1st place, gold medalist(s)	1st place, gold medalist(s)	1st place, gold medalist(s)
Junior
2022	1st Bundesliga	6	5				
2022	Top 12 Finals	3rd place, bronze medalist(s)					
2022	2nd Bundesliga	7					
2022	German Junior Championships				1st place, gold medalist(s)	1st place, gold medalist(s)	1st place, gold medalist(s)
2022	European Youth Olympic Festival	5	4		4	2nd place, silver medalist(s)	
2022	EYOF Mixed Pairs	3rd place, bronze medalist(s)					
2022	European Championships		5			1st place, gold medalist(s)	8
Senior
2023	Doha World Cup				1st place, gold medalist(s)	2nd place, silver medalist(s)	
2023	Baku World Cup					3rd place, bronze medalist(s)	
2023	European Championships	16	32				
2023	Mersin World Challenge Cup				1st place, gold medalist(s)	1st place, gold medalist(s)	
2023	Szombathely World Challenge Cup				8	1st place, gold medalist(s)	
2023	World Championships		38				
2024	Osijek Challenge Cup				2nd place, silver medalist(s)	1st place, gold medalist(s)	
2024	Doha World Cup					1st place, gold medalist(s)	
2024	Olympic Games		49				
