= Achta Derib =

Chadian gymnast (born 2008)

- Born: 2008 (age 17–18)
- Citizenship: Chad
- Occupation: artistic gymnast

Achta Derib (born 2008) is a Chadian female artistic gymnast. She is a member of the Chad women's national artistic gymnastics team.

Derib became known as an inspiring gymnast from Chad who rose from limited opportunities to compete internationally, becoming a symbol of resilience and determination. Her journey, widely highlighted through photography by Antonio López Díaz, also represents how access to sport and education can transform lives and expand opportunities for girls in her country.

== Biography ==
Achta Derib was born in the year 2008. in the year 2016, Achta Derib was among the girls who joined the gymnastics class at the a school in Toukra outside the capital N'Djamena, that was organized by Chadian Jesuit priest and a Spanish club president, with support from Spain's Ramón Grosso Foundation. As being one of the best gymnasts of the class. Derib and three other girls moved to Spain to train ahead of the 2024 Paris Olympics.

With her team she finished fourth at the 2024 African Artistic Gymnastics Championships in Marrakesh. At the individual events Derib finished finishing ninth in the competition overall and reached the finals of the uneven bars.

The journey of Derib was documented by Antonio López Díaz since 2019. A photograph of Derib by Díaz reached the final in the professional sports category at the Sony World Photography Awards.
