= Artistic gymnastics at the 2022 European Youth Summer Olympic Festival =

- Venue: Stadium of Artistic Gymnastics
- Location: (Slovakia) Banská Bystrica
- Date: 26–30 July 2022

Artistic gymnastics at the 2022 European Youth Summer Olympic Festival was held at the Stadium of Artistic Gymnastics in Banská Bystrica, Slovakia from 26 to 30 July 2022.

== Medals summary ==
=== Medalists ===
==== Boys ====
Event	Gold	Silver	Bronze
Team all-around	Italy; Tommaso Brugnami; Davide Oppizzio; Riccardo Villa	Great Britain; Oakley Banks; Danny Crouch; Reuben Ward	Switzerland; Matteo Giubellini; Jan Imhof; Mirco Riva
Individual all-around	Radomyr Stelmakh; Ukraine	Riccardo Villa; Italy	Matteo Giubellini; Switzerland
Floor exercise	Danny Crouch; Great Britain	Radomyr Stelmakh; Ukraine	Amine Abaidi; Netherlands
Pommel horse	Kristijonas Padegimas; Lithuania	Radomyr Stelmakh; Ukraine	Alfred Schwaiger; Austria
Rings	Luis Il-Sung Melander; Sweden	Dmytro Prudko; Ukraine	Paco Fernandes Henriques; France
Vault	Joona Reiman; Finland	Bozhidar Zlatanov; Bulgaria	Tommaso Brugnami; Italy
Parallel bars	Jukka Ole Nissinen; Germany	Bozhidar Zlatanov; Bulgaria	Radomyr Stelmakh; Ukraine
Horizontal bar	Dmytro Dotsenko; Israel	Danny Crouch; Great Britain	Davide Oppizzio; Italy

==== Girls ====
Event	Gold	Silver	Bronze
Team all-around	Romania; Amalia Ghigoarță; Sabrina Voinea; Amalia Puflea	Germany; Marlene Gotthardt; Meolie Maria Jauch; Helen Kevric	Italy; Arianna Grillo; July Marano; Martina Pieratti
Individual all-around	Helen Kevric; Germany	Amalia Puflea; Romania	Lilou Viallat; France
Vault	Helen Kevric; Germany	Ruby Evans; Great Britain	Sara Bergmann Jacobsen; Denmark
Uneven bars	Martina Pieratti; Italy	Helen Kevric; Germany	Meolie Maria Jauch; Germany
Balance beam	Amalia Puflea; Romania	Anna Lashchevska; Ukraine	Arianna Grillo; Italy
Floor exercise	Amalia Puflea; Romania	Helen Kevric; Germany July Marano; Italy	None awarded

==== Mixed ====
Event	Gold	Silver	Bronze
Pairs	Italy; Riccardo Villa; Arianna Grillo	Germany; Jukka Ole Nissinen; Helen Kevric	Ukraine; Radomyr Stelmakh; Anna Lashchevska

=== Medal standings ===
==== Overall ====
Rank	Nation	Gold	Silver	Bronze	Total
1	Germany (GER)	3	4	1	8
2	Italy (ITA)	3	2	4	9
3	Romania (ROU)	3	1	0	4
4	Ukraine (UKR)	1	4	2	7
5	Great Britain (GBR)	1	3	0	4
6	Finland (FIN)	1	0	0	1
6	Israel (ISR)	1	0	0	1
6	Lithuania (LTU)	1	0	0	1
6	Sweden (SWE)	1	0	0	1
10	Bulgaria (BUL)	0	2	0	2
11	France (FRA)	0	0	2	2
11	Switzerland (SUI)	0	0	2	2
13	Austria (AUT)	0	0	1	1
13	Denmark (DEN)	0	0	1	1
13	Netherlands (NED)	0	0	1	1
Totals (15 entries)		15	16	14	45

==== Boys ====
Rank	Nation	Gold	Silver	Bronze	Total
1	Ukraine (UKR)	1	3	1	5
2	Great Britain (GBR)	1	2	0	3
3	Italy (ITA)	1	1	2	4
4	Finland (FIN)	1	0	0	1
4	Germany (GER)	1	0	0	1
4	Israel (ISR)	1	0	0	1
4	Lithuania (LTU)	1	0	0	1
4	Sweden (SWE)	1	0	0	1
9	Bulgaria (BUL)	0	2	0	2
10	Switzerland (SUI)	0	0	2	2
11	Austria (AUT)	0	0	1	1
11	France (FRA)	0	0	1	1
11	Netherlands (NED)	0	0	1	1
Totals (13 entries)		8	8	8	24

==== Girls ====
Rank	Nation	Gold	Silver	Bronze	Total
1	Romania (ROU)	3	1	0	4
2	Germany (GER)	2	3	1	6
3	Italy (ITA)	1	1	2	4
4	Great Britain (GBR)	0	1	0	1
4	Ukraine (UKR)	0	1	0	1
6	Denmark (DEN)	0	0	1	1
6	France (FRA)	0	0	1	1
Totals (7 entries)		6	7	5	18

==== Mixed ====
Rank	Nation	Gold	Silver	Bronze	Total
1	Italy (ITA)	1	0	0	1
2	Germany (GER)	0	1	0	1
3	Ukraine (UKR)	0	0	1	1
Totals (3 entries)		1	1	1	3

== Boys' results ==
=== Team ===
Rank	Team	Floor (gymnastics)	Pommel horse	Rings (gymnastics)	Vault (gymnastics)	Parallel bars	Horizontal bar	Total
1st place, gold medalist(s)	Italy	26.700	25.200	26.300	28.100	26.300	26.150	158.750
1st place, gold medalist(s)	Tommaso Brugnami	13.500	11.750		14.150			158.750
1st place, gold medalist(s)	Davide Oppizzio			13.200		13.100	13.200	158.750
1st place, gold medalist(s)	Riccardo Villa	13.200	13.450	13.100	13.950	13.200	12.950	158.750
2nd place, silver medalist(s)	United Kingdom	27.000	26.800	25.350	27.600	26.150	25.650	158.550
2nd place, silver medalist(s)	Oakley Banks	13.250		12.800				158.550
2nd place, silver medalist(s)	Danny Crouch	13.750	13.200	12.550	13.800	13.000	12.850	158.550
2nd place, silver medalist(s)	Reuben Ward		13.600		13.800	13.150	12.800	158.550
3rd place, bronze medalist(s)	Switzerland	27.000	25.600	26.050	28.150	26.800	24.600	158.200
3rd place, bronze medalist(s)	Matteo Giubellini	13.450	13.400	13.200	14.150	13.400		158.200
3rd place, bronze medalist(s)	Jan Imhof	13.550		12.850	14.000	13.400	12.550	158.200
3rd place, bronze medalist(s)	Mirco Riva		12.200				12.050	158.200
4	Spain	26.100	25.650	25.350	28.050	26.050	25.650	156.850
4	Daniel Carrion Caro	13.150	12.750	12.700	14.400	13.250	12.850	156.850
4	Alvaro Giraldez Perez				13.650	12.800	12.800	156.850
4	Pablo Ruiz Sanchez	12.950	12.900	12.650				156.850
5	Germany	26.000	25.200	25.800	27.300	26.050	25.850	156.200
5	Maxim Kovalenko			12.850	14.100	12.750		156.200
5	Danie Mousichidis	13.100	13.400				13.000	156.200
5	Jukka Ole Nissinen	12.900	11.800	12.950	13.200	13.300	12.850	156.200
6	Ukraine	26.450	23.750	26.100	26.950	27.000	24.750	155.000
6	Dmytro Prudko		10.400	13.100	13.000	13.400	12.300	155.000
6	Radomyr Stelmakh	13.550	13.350	13.000	13.950	13.600	12.450	155.000
6	Yulian Yuzyfyshyn	12.900						155.000
7	France	26.550	24.700	25.700	26.950	25.750	25.250	154.900
7	Manoah Felicite		12.750		13.700		12.300	154.900
7	Paco Fernandes Henriques	13.150		13.300	13.250	12.550		154.900
7	Anthony Mansard	13.400	11.950	12.400		13.200	12.950	154.900
8	Austria	25.950	26.300	25.000	28.000	25.550	24.450	154.250
8	Nicolas Ickic		12.800	12.600	13.900	12.150	12.250	154.250
8	Alfred Schwaiger	12.650	13.500					154.250
8	Gino Vetter	13.300		12.400	14.100	13.400	12.200	154.250

=== Individual all-around ===
Rank	Gymnast	Floor (gymnastics)	Pommel horse	Rings (gymnastics)	Vault (gymnastics)	Parallel bars	Horizontal bar	Total
1st place, gold medalist(s)	(Ukraine) Radomyr Stelmakh	13.550	13.350	13.000	13.950	13.600	12.450	79.900
2nd place, silver medalist(s)	(Italy) Riccardo Villa	13.200	13.450	13.100	13.950	13.200	12.950	79.850
3rd place, bronze medalist(s)	(Switzerland) Matteo Giubellini	13.450	13.400	13.200	14.150	13.400	11.900	79.500
4	(United Kingdom) Danny Crouch	13.750	13.200	12.550	13.800	13.000	12.850	79.150
5	(Spain) Daniel Carrion Caro	13.150	12.750	12.700	14.400	13.250	12.850	79.100
6	(Switzerland) Jan Imhof	13.550	12.100	12.850	14.000	13.400	12.550	78.450
7	(United Kingdom) Reuben Ward	12.900	13.600	12.200	13.800	13.150	12.800	78.450
8	(Norway) Sebastian Sponevik	13.400	12.700	12.700	14.050	13.100	12.400	78.350
9	(Bulgaria) Bozhidar Zlatanov	13.350	13.000	11.750	14.300	13.650	12.200	78.250
10	(Italy) Tommaso Brugnami	13.500	11.750	12.700	14.150	12.850	12.900	77.850
11	(Austria) Gino Vetter	13.300	12.400	12.400	14.100	13.400	12.200	77.800
12	(United Kingdom) Oakley Banks	13.250	12.900	12.800	13.600	12.900	12.250	77.700
13	(Netherlands) Amine Abaidi	13.550	12.000	12.650	14.400	12.250	12.500	77.350
14	(Germany) Danie Mousichidis	13.100	13.400	12.400	13.050	12.150	13.000	77.100
15	(Germany) Jukka Ole Nissinen	12.900	11.800	12.950	13.200	13.300	12.850	77.000
16	(France) Anthony Mansard	13.400	11.950	12.400	12.900	13.200	12.950	76.800
17	(Netherlands) Elijah Faverus	12.900	12.950	12.600	13.750	12.350	12.100	76.650
18	(Armenia) Erik Baghdasaryan	12.700	12.800	13.000	11.900	13.250	12.650	76.300
19	(Italy) Davide Oppizzio	13.000	10.950	13.200	12.750	13.100	13.200	76.200
20	(Spain) Pablo Ruiz Sanchez	12.950	12.900	12.650	13.600	11.800	12.250	76.150
21	(Spain) Alvaro Giraldez Perez	12.100	12.350	12.450	13.650	12.800	12.800	76.150
22	(Israel) Dmytro Dotsenko	12.450	11.850	12.900	12.750	12.600	13.550	76.100
23	(Austria) Nicolas Ivkic	12.150	12.800	12.600	13.900	12.150	12.250	75.850
24	(Sweden) Luis Il-Sung Melander	12.150	12.250	13.600	12.700	12.850	12.300	75.850

=== Floor ===
Rank	Gymnast	D Score	E Score	Pen.	Total
1st place, gold medalist(s)	(United Kingdom) Danny Crouch	5.0	8.900		13.900
2nd place, silver medalist(s)	(Ukraine) Radomyr Stelmakh	5.0	8.666		13.666
3rd place, bronze medalist(s)	(Netherlands) Amine Abaidi	4.5	9.100		13.600
4	(Switzerland) Matteo Giubellini	4.7	8.633		13.333
5	(Italy) Tommaso Brugnami	4.8	8.433		13.233
6	(Norway) Sebastian Sponevik	4.8	8.366		13.166
7	(France) Anthony Mansard	4.9	8.333	-0.3	12.933
8	(Bulgaria) Bozhidar Zlatanov	4.9	7.466		12.366

=== Pommel horse ===
Rank	Gymnast	D Score	E Score	Pen.	Total
1st place, gold medalist(s)	(Lithuania) Kristijonas Padegimas	5.3	9.166		14.466
2nd place, silver medalist(s)	(Ukraine) Radomyr Stelmakh	5.4	8.666		14.066
3rd place, bronze medalist(s)	(Austria) Alfred Schwaiger	4.8	8.766		13.566
4	(Italy) Riccardo Villa	5.5	7.966		13.466
5	(United Kingdom) Danny Crouch	4.6	8.700		13.300
6	(Germany) Danie Mousichidis	5.2	8.033		13.233
7	(Switzerland) Matteo Giubellini	4.7	7.633		12.333
8	(United Kingdom) Reuben Ward	4.6	7.633		12.233

=== Rings ===
Rank	Gymnast	D Score	E Score	Pen.	Total
1st place, gold medalist(s)	(Sweden) Luis Il-Sung Melander	5.0	8.633		13.633
2nd place, silver medalist(s)	(Ukraine) Dmytro Prudko	4.4	9.066		13.466
3rd place, bronze medalist(s)	(France) Paco Fernandes Henriques	4.7	8.633		13.333
4	(Switzerland) Matteo Giubellini	4.4	8.700		13.100
5	(Italy) Riccardo Villa	4.3	8.600		12.900
6	(Turkey) Volkan Arda Hmarat	4.1	8.500		12.600
7	(Italy) Davide Oppizzio	3.9	7.900		11.800
8	(Netherlands) Daniel Hasson	4.1	7.600		11.700

=== Vault ===
Rank	Gymnast	Vault 1				Vault 2				Total
Rank	Gymnast	D Score	E Score	Pen.	Score 1	D Score	E Score	Pen.	Score 2	Total
1st place, gold medalist(s)	(Finland) Joona Reiman	5.6	9.000		14.600	5.2	8.866		14.066	14.333
2nd place, silver medalist(s)	(Bulgaria) Bozhidar Zlatanov	5.2	9.000	-0.1	14.100	4.8	9.366		14.166	14.133
3rd place, bronze medalist(s)	(Italy) Tommaso Brugnami	4.8	9.500		14.300	4.8	9.100		13.900	14.100
4	(Netherlands) Amine Abaidi	5.2	9.266		14.466	4.0	9.266		13.266	13.866
5	(Germany) Maxim Kovalenko	4.8	9.200		14.000	4.8	8.566	-0.3	13.066	13.533
6	(Switzerland) Matteo Giubellini	4.8	8.966		13.766	4.0	9.033		13.033	13.399
7	(Spain) Daniel Carrion Caro	5.2	8.833	-0.3	13.733	5.2	7.700		12.900	13.316
8	(Italy) Riccardo Villa	1.6	8.133	-0.3	9.433	5.2	8.633		13.833	11.633

=== Parallel bars ===
Rank	Gymnast	D Score	E Score	Pen.	Total
1st place, gold medalist(s)	(Germany) Jukka Ole Nissinen	4.6	8.966		13.566
2nd place, silver medalist(s)	(Bulgaria) Bozhidar Zlatanov	4.8	8.666		13.466
3rd place, bronze medalist(s)	(Ukraine) Radomyr Stelmakh	4.9	8.400		13.300
4	(Armenia) Erik Baghdasaryan	4.4	8.666		13.066
5	(Austria) Gino Vetter	4.2	8.700		12.900
6	(Turkey) Mert Efe Kilicer	4.8	7.566		12.366
7	(Spain) Daniel Carrion Caro	4.5	7.633		12.133
8	(Switzerland) Matteo Giubellini	4.4	7.566		11.966

=== Horizontal bar ===
Rank	Gymnast	D Score	E Score	Pen.	Total
1st place, gold medalist(s)	(Israel) Dmytro Dotsenko	4.5	9.133		13.633
2nd place, silver medalist(s)	(United Kingdom) Danny Crouch	4.1	8.933		13.033
3rd place, bronze medalist(s)	(Italy) Davide Oppizzio	4.3	8.733		13.033
4	(Italy) Riccardo Villa	4.4	8.600		13.000
5	(France) Anthony Mansard	4.5	8.500		13.000
6	(Germany) Jukka Ole Nissinen	4.3	8.666		12.966
7	(Germany) Danie Mousichidis	4.4	8.466		12.866
8	(Spain) Daniel Carrion Caro	4.3	8.366		12.666

== Girls' results ==
=== Team ===
Rank	Team	Vault (gymnastics)	Uneven bars	Balance beam	Floor (gymnastics)	Total
1st place, gold medalist(s)	Romania	26.900	25.500	24.900	25.650	102.950
1st place, gold medalist(s)	Amalia Ghigoarță		13.000	12.000		102.950
1st place, gold medalist(s)	Sabrina Voinea	13.650			12.650	102.950
1st place, gold medalist(s)	Amalia Puflea	13.250	12.500	12.900	13.000	102.950
2nd place, silver medalist(s)	Germany	27.050	26.700	23.550	25.200	102.500
2nd place, silver medalist(s)	Marlene Gotthardt			12.000		102.500
2nd place, silver medalist(s)	Meolie Maria Jauch	13.050	13.350		12.350	102.500
2nd place, silver medalist(s)	Helen Kevric	14.000	13.350	11.550	12.850	102.500
3rd place, bronze medalist(s)	Italy	26.400	25.300	25.100	25.350	102.150
3rd place, bronze medalist(s)	Arianna Grillo	13.150		12.550	12.350	102.150
3rd place, bronze medalist(s)	July Marano	13.250	12.050		13.000	102.150
3rd place, bronze medalist(s)	Martina Pieratti		13.250	12.550		102.150
4	France	26.200	25.250	25.500	24.800	101.750
4	Ambre Frotte	13.000	12.400		12.200	101.750
4	Lana Pondart			12.500		101.750
4	Lilou Viallat	13.200	12.850	13.000	12.600	101.750
5	Ukraine	26.200	25.100	23.900	24.500	99.700
5	Polina Diachenko	13.050				99.700
5	Anna Lashchevska		13.050	12.900	12.100	99.700
5	Anastasiia Zubkova	13.150	12.050	11.000	12.400	99.700
6	United Kingdom	26.550	23.300	24.000	24.550	98.400
6	Ruby Evans	13.550			12.100	98.400
6	Evie Flage-Donovan		11.900	12.300		98.400
6	Abigail Martin	13.000	11.400	11.700	12.450	98.400
7	Czech Republic	25.200	24.200	25.000	23.850	98.250
7	Sona Artamonova	12.300		12.800	12.000	98.250
7	Vanesa Masova		12.650			98.250
7	Alice Vlkova	12.900	11.550	12.200	11.850	98.250
8	Switzerland	25.050	23.900	24.050	24.650	97.650
8	Lou-Anne Citherlet	12.200		12.100		97.650
8	Kiara Raffin		11.550	11.950	12.250	97.650
8	Samira Raffin	12.850	12.350		12.400	97.650

=== Individual all-around ===
Rank	Gymnast	Vault (gymnastics)	Uneven bars	Balance beam	Floor (gymnastics)	Total
1st place, gold medalist(s)	(Germany) Helen Kevric	14.000	13.350	11.550	12.850	51.750
2nd place, silver medalist(s)	(Romania) Amalia Puflea	13.250	12.500	12.900	13.000	51.650
3rd place, bronze medalist(s)	(France) Lilou Viallat	13.200	12.850	13.000	12.600	51.650
4	(Ukraine) Anna Lashchevska	12.750	13.050	12.900	12.100	50.800
5	(Romania) Amalia Ghigoarță	12.950	13.000	12.000	12.600	50.550
6	(Sweden) Elina Gravin	12.250	13.250	12.600	12.250	50.350
7	(Germany) Meolie Maria Jauch	13.050	13.350	11.300	12.350	50.050
8	(Italy) July Marano	13.250	12.050	11.550	13.000	49.850
9	(Slovakia) Lucia Dobrocka	12.900	12.600	12.350	11.700	49.550
10	(Italy) Arianna Grillo	13.150	11.350	12.550	12.350	49.400
11	(Switzerland) Samira Raffin	12.850	12.350	11.700	12.400	49.300
12	(Romania) Sabrina Voinea	13.650	11.200	11.450	12.650	48.950
13	(Italy) Martina Pieratti	11.100	13.250	12.550	12.000	48.900
14	(Hungary) Bettina Lili Czifra	12.650	11.900	12.400	11.900	48.850
15	(France) Ambre Frotte	13.000	12.400	11.200	12.200	48.800
16	(Germany) Marlene Gotthardt	13.000	11.850	12.000	11.800	48.650
17	(Ukraine) Anastasiia Zubkova	13.150	12.050	11.000	12.400	48.600
18	(United Kingdom) Abigail Martin	13.000	11.400	11.700	12.450	48.550
19	(Czech Republic) Alice Vlkova	12.900	11.550	12.200	11.850	48.500
20	(Czech Republic) Sona Artamonova	12.300	11.250	12.800	12.000	48.350
21	(United Kingdom) Evie Flage-Donovan	12.950	11.900	12.300	10.950	48.100
22	(Austria) Leni Bohle	13.300	10.400	12.450	11.750	47.900
23	(Switzerland) Kiara Raffin	12.000	11.550	11.950	12.250	47.750
24	(Azerbaijan) Nazanin Teymurova	13.150	10.950	12.000	11.500	47.600

=== Vault ===
Rank	Gymnast	Vault 1				Vault 2				Total
Rank	Gymnast	D Score	E Score	Pen.	Score 1	D Score	E Score	Pen.	Score 2	Total
1st place, gold medalist(s)	(Germany) Helen Kevric	5.0	8.666		13.666	4.2	9.166		13.366	13.516
2nd place, silver medalist(s)	(United Kingdom) Ruby Evans	5.0	8.833		13.833	4.2	8.933		13.133	13.483
3rd place, bronze medalist(s)	(Denmark) Sara Jacobsen	4.6	8.833		13.433	4.2	8.966		13.166	13.299
4	(Romania) Sabrina Voinea	4.2	8.766		12.966	5.0	8.566		13.566	13.266
5	(Azerbaijan) Nazanin Teymurova	4.4	8.533	-0.1	12.833	4.0	8.833		12.833	12.833
6	(Germany) Marlene Gotthardt	4.2	8.100		12.300	4.2	8.666		12.866	12.583
7	(Czech Republic) Alice Vlkova	4.2	8.633	-1.1	11.733	4.4	8.800		13.200	12.466
8	(Italy) July Marano	4.6	7.633	-0.3	11.933	4.2	8.800		13.000	12.466

=== Uneven bars ===
Rank	Gymnast	D Score	E Score	Pen.	Total
1st place, gold medalist(s)	(Italy) Martina Pieratti	5.8	7.766		13.566
2nd place, silver medalist(s)	(Germany) Helen Kevric	5.4	8.066		13.466
3rd place, bronze medalist(s)	(Germany) Meolie Maria Jauch	5.5	7.700		13.200
4	(Ukraine) Anna Lashchevska	5.3	7.733		13.033
5	(Romania) Amalia Ghigoarță	5.1	7.833		12.933
6	(France) Lilou Viallat	4.8	8.000		12.800
7	(Czech Republic) Vanesa Masova	4.9	7.733		12.633
8	(Sweden) Elina Gravin	4.1	6.466		10.566

=== Balance beam ===
Rank	Gymnast	D Score	E Score	Pen.	Total
1st place, gold medalist(s)	(Romania) Amalia Puflea	5.3	8.066		13.366
2nd place, silver medalist(s)	(Ukraine) Anna Lashchevska	5.3	7.700		13.000
3rd place, bronze medalist(s)	(Italy) Arianna Grillo	4.8	8.100		12.900
4	(Sweden) Elina Gravin	4.7	8.100		12.800
5	(France) Lilou Viallat	4.6	8.133		12.733
6	(Italy) Martina Pieratti	5.2	7.466		12.666
7	(Czech Republic) Sona Artamonova	4.8	7.600		12.400
8	(France) Lana Pondart	4.7	6.600		11.300

=== Floor ===
Rank	Gymnast	D Score	E Score	Pen.	Total
1st place, gold medalist(s)	(Romania) Amalia Puflea	5.1	8.100		13.200
2nd place, silver medalist(s)	(Germany) Helen Kevric	5.0	8.066		13.066
2nd place, silver medalist(s)	(Italy) July Marano	5.0	8.066		13.066
4	(United Kingdom) Abigail Martin	5.0	7.900		12.900
5	(Romania) Sabrina Voinea	4.9	7.800		12.700
6	(Switzerland) Samira Raffin	4.4	8.100		12.500
7	(Italy) Arianna Grillo	4.8	7.800	-0.3	12.300
8	(Ukraine) Anastasiia Zubkova	4.5	7.533	-0.1	11.933

== Mixed results ==
=== Pairs ===
==== Rounds 1&2 ====
Rank	Team	Gymnast	Apparatus 1	Scores 1	Apparatus 2	Scores 2	Total
1	Italy	Riccardo Villa	HB	13.033	FX	13.533	52.332
1	Italy	Arianna Grillo	FX	12.833	VT	12.933	52.332
2	Germany	Jukka Ole Nissinen	HB	12.866	PB	12.266	51.498
2	Germany	Helen Kevric	FX	13.000	VT	13.366	51.498
3	Romania	David Puicea	HB	12.100	FX	12.900	51.066
3	Romania	Amalia Puflea	VT	13.133	FX	12.933	51.066
4	Ukraine	Radomyr Stelmakh	FX	12.266	PB	13.733	50.999
4	Ukraine	Anna Lashchevska	VT	12.900	FX	12.100	50.999
5	United Kingdom	Danny Crouch	PB	12.866	HB	12.833	50.665
5	United Kingdom	Abigail Martin	BB	12.000	VT	12.966	50.665
6	Austria	Gino Vetter	PB	11.933	FX	13.300	50.499
6	Austria	Leni Bohle	FX	12.100	VT	13.166	50.499
7	Slovakia	Oliver Kasala	FX	12.233	PB	12.900	50.065
7	Slovakia	Lucia Dobrocka	VT	12.466	BB	12.466	50.065
8	France	Anthony Mansard	FX	13.166	PB	13.233	50.065
8	France	Lana Pondart	VT	11.733	FX	11.933	50.065
9	Sweden	Luis Il-Sung Melander	HB	12.200	PB	12.900	49.866
9	Sweden	Elina Gravin	BB	12.566	VT	12.200	49.866
10	Azerbaijan	Rasul Ahmadzada	PB	12.366	FX	12.233	49.765
10	Azerbaijan	Nazanin Teymurova	VT	13.133	FX	12.033	49.765
11	Spain	Daniel Carrion Caro	HB	12.800	PB	13.000	49.733
11	Spain	Sainza Garcia Tejada	VT	13.300	FX	10.633	49.733
12	Switzerland	Jan Imhof	FX	13.200	PB	12.533	49.699
12	Switzerland	Samira Raffin	FX	12.400	VT	11.566	49.699
13	Israel	Dmytro Dotsenko	PB	13.066	HB	13.266	49.565
13	Israel	Yali Shoshani	VT	12.133	FX	11.100	49.565
14	Norway	Sebastian Sponevik	PB	12.800	HB	12.366	49.332
14	Norway	Keisha Lockert	VT	12.533	FX	11.633	49.332
15	Turkey	Volkan Arda Hamarat	FX	12.233	PB	12.833	49.332
15	Turkey	Atiye Berra Karademir	VT	12.600	FX	11.666	49.332
16	Czech Republic	Daniel Bago	FX	12.100	PB	10.600	46.900
16	Czech Republic	Sona Artamonova	BB	12.400	FX	11.800	46.900

==== Round 3 ====
Bracket 1

Rank	Team	Gymnast	Apparatus	Scores	Total	Qual.
1	Italy	Riccardo Villa	PB	12.766	24.366	R5
1	Italy	Arianna Grillo	BB	11.600	24.366	R5
2	Ukraine	Radomyr Stelmakh	HB		24.300	R4
2	Ukraine	Anna Lashchevska	BB		24.300	R4

Bracket 2

Rank	Team	Gymnast	Apparatus	Scores	Total	Qual.
1	Germany	Jukka Ole Nissinen	FX	12.866	25.866	R5
1	Germany	Helen Kevric	BB	13.000	25.866	R5
2	Romania	David Puicea	PB	11.766	22.532	R4
2	Romania	Amalia Puflea	BB	10.766	22.532	R4

==== Round 4 ====
Rank	Team	Gymnast	Apparatus	Scores	Total
3rd place, bronze medalist(s)	Ukraine	Radomyr Stelmakh	FX	13.600	26.400
3rd place, bronze medalist(s)	Ukraine	Anna Lashchevska	BB	12.800	26.400
4	Romania	David Puicea	FX	13.033	25.849
4	Romania	Amalia Puflea	VT	12.816	25.849

==== Round 5 ====
Rank	Team	Gymnast	Apparatus	Scores	Total
1st place, gold medalist(s)	Italy	Riccardo Villa	FX	13.366	26.349
1st place, gold medalist(s)	Italy	Arianna Grillo	VT	12.983	26.349
2nd place, silver medalist(s)	Germany	Jukka Ole Nissinen	HB	13.033	26.033
2nd place, silver medalist(s)	Germany	Helen Kevric	VT	13.000	26.033

== Qualification ==
=== Boys' results ===
==== Floor ====
Rank	Gymnast	D Score	E Score	Pen.	Total	Qual.
1	(United Kingdom) Danny Crouch	5.0	8.750		13.750	Q
2	(Netherlands) Amine Abaidi	4.5	9.050		13.550	Q
3	(Switzerland) Jan Imhof	5.0	8.550		13.550	Q
3	(Ukraine) Radomyr Stelmakh	5.0	8.550		13.550	Q
5	(Italy) Tommaso Brugnami	4.8	8.700		13.500	Q
6	(Switzerland) Matteo Giubellini	4.6	8.850		13.450	Q
7	(Norway) Sebastian Sponevik	4.8	8.600		13.400	Q
8	(France) Anthony Mansard	4.9	8.500		13.400	Q
9	(Bulgaria) Bozhidar Zlatanov	4.9	8.450		13.350	R1
10	(Armenia) Robert Gyulumyan	4.1	9.200		13.300	R2
11	(Austria) Gino Vetter	4.6	8.700		13.300	R3

==== Pommel horse ====
Rank	Gymnast	D Score	E Score	Pen.	Total	Qual.
1	(Lithuania) Kristijonas Padegimas	5.3	9.200		14.500	Q
2	(United Kingdom) Reuben Ward	4.6	9.000		13.600	Q
3	(Austria) Alfred Schwaiger	4.8	8.700		13.500	Q
4	(Italy) Riccardo Villa	4.9	8.550		13.450	Q
5	(Switzerland) Matteo Giubellini	4.8	8.600		13.400	Q
6	(Germany) Danie Mousichidis	5.3	8.100		13.400	Q
7	(Ukraine) Radomyr Stelmakh	5.4	7.950		13.350	Q
8	(United Kingdom) Danny Crouch	4.6	8.600		13.200	Q
9	(Greece) Nikolaos Tsoulos	4.3	8.750		13.050	R1
10	(Slovenia) Kevin Buckley	4.4	8.600		13.000	R2
10	(Bulgaria) Bozhidar Zlatanov	4.4	8.600		13.000	R2

==== Rings ====
Rank	Gymnast	D Score	E Score	Pen.	Total	Qual.
1	(Sweden) Luis Il-Sung Melander	5.0	8.600		13.600	Q
2	(France) Paco Fernandes Henriques	4.7	8.600		13.300	Q
3	(Italy) Davide Oppizzio	4.1	9.100		13.200	Q
4	(Switzerland) Matteo Giubellini	4.4	8.800		13.200	Q
5	(Turkey) Volkan Arda Hmarat	4.1	9.050		13.150	Q
6	(Netherlands) Daniel Hasson	4.1	9.000		13.100	Q
7	(Italy) Riccardo Villa	4.3	8.800		13.100	Q
8	(Ukraine) Dmytro Prudko	4.4	8.700		13.100	Q
9	(Armenia) Erik Baghdasaryan	4.1	8.900		13.000	R1
10	(Ukraine) Radomyr Stelmakh	4.3	8.700		13.000	R2
11	(Germany) Jukka Ole Nissinen	4.2	8.750		12.950	R3

==== Vault ====
Rank	Gymnast	Vault 1				Vault 2				Total	Qual.
Rank	Gymnast	D Score	E Score	Pen.	Score 1	D Score	E Score	Pen.	Score 2	Total	Qual.
1	(Finland) Joona Reiman	5.6	8.850		14.450	5.2	8.650		13.850	14.150	Q
2	(Italy) Tommaso Brugnami	4.8	9.350		14.150	4.8	9.200		14.000	14.075	Q
3	(Netherlands) Amine Abaidi	5.2	9.200		14.400	4.0	9.550		13.550	13.975	Q
4	(Bulgaria) Bozhidar Zlatanov	5.2	9.200	-0.1	14.300	4.8	9.100	-0.3	13.600	13.950	Q
5	(Italy) Riccardo Villa	5.2	8.850	-0.1	13.950	4.8	9.100	-0.1	13.800	13.875	Q
6	(Germany) Maxim Kovalenko	4.8	9.300		14.100	4.8	8.900	-0.1	13.600	13.850	Q
7	(Spain) Daniel Carrion Caro	5.2	9.200		14.400	5.2	8.050		13.250	13.825	Q
8	(Switzerland) Matteo Giubellini	4.8	9.350		14.150	4.0	9.500		13.500	13.825	Q
9	(Spain) Pablo Ruiz Sanchez	4.8	8.900	-0.1	13.600	5.2	8.650		13.850	13.725	R1
10	(Switzerland) Jan Imhof	4.8	9.200		14.000	4.0	9.300		13.300	13.650	R2
11	(Norway) Sebastian Sponevik	5.2	8.950	-0.1	14.050	5.2	8.000		13.200	13.625	R3

==== Parallel bars ====
Rank	Gymnast	D Score	E Score	Pen.	Total	Qual.
1	(Bulgaria) Bozhidar Zlatanov	4.8	8.850		13.650	Q
2	(Ukraine) Radomyr Stelmakh	4.9	8.700		13.600	Q
3	(Austria) Gino Vetter	4.2	9.200		13.400	Q
4	(Switzerland) Jan Imhof	4.5	8.900		13.400	Q
4	(Turkey) Mert Efe Kilicer	4.5	8.900		13.400	Q
6	(Switzerland) Matteo Giubellini	4.6	8.800		13.400	Q
7	(Ukraine) Dmytro Prudko	5.0	8.400		13.400	Q
8	(Germany) Jukka Ole Nissinen	4.6	8.700		13.300	Q
9	(Armenia) Erik Baghdasaryan	4.4	8.850		13.250	R1
10	(Spain) Daniel Carrion Caro	4.5	8.750		13.250	R2
11	(France) Anthony Mansard	4.5	8.700		13.200	R3

==== Horizontal bar ====
Rank	Gymnast	D Score	E Score	Pen.	Total	Qual.
1	(Israel) Dmytro Dotsenko	4.5	9.050		13.550	Q
2	(Italy) Davide Oppizzio	4.3	8.900		13.200	Q
3	(Germany) Danie Mousichidisl	4.4	8.600		13.000	Q
4	(France) Anthony Mansard	4.5	8.450		12.950	Q
4	(Italy) Riccardo Villa	4.5	8.450		12.950	Q
6	(Italy) Tommaso Brugnami	4.2	8.700		12.900	–
7	(United Kingdom) Danny Crouch	4.1	8.750		12.850	Q
8	(Spain) Daniel Carrion Caro	4.3	8.550		12.850	Q
8	(Germany) Jukka Ole Nissinen	4.3	8.550		12.850	Q
10	(Spain) Alvaro Giraldez Perez	3.9	8.900		12.800	R1
10	(United Kingdom) Reuben Ward	3.9	8.900		12.800	R1
12	(Romania) David Puicea	3.9	8.750		12.650	R3

=== Girls' results ===
==== Vault ====
Rank	Gymnast	Vault 1				Vault 2				Total	Qual.
Rank	Gymnast	D Score	E Score	Pen.	Score 1	D Score	E Score	Pen.	Score 2	Total	Qual.
1	(Germany) Helen Kevric	5.0	9.000		14.000	4.2	9.250		13.450	13.725	Q
2	(United Kingdom) Ruby Evans	5.0	8.650	-0.1	13.550	4.2	9.100		13.300	13.425	Q
3	(Denmark) Sara Jacobsen	4.6	8.850		13.450	4.2	8.950		13.150	13.300	Q
4	(Romania) Sabrina Voinea	5.0	8.650		13.650	4.2	8.700		12.900	13.275	Q
5	(Italy) July Marano	4.6	8.750	-0.1	13.250	4.2	8.750		12.950	13.100	Q
6	(Azerbaijan) Nazanin Teymurova	4.4	8.750		13.150	4.0	9.000		13.000	13.075	Q
7	(Czech Republic) Alice Vlkova	4.2	8.700		12.900	4.4	8.800		13.200	13.050	Q
8	(Germany) Marlene Gotthardt	4.0	9.000		13.000	4.2	8.900		13.100	13.050	Q
9	(Italy) Arianna Grillo	4.2	8.950		13.150	3.6	9.150		12.750	12.950	R1
10	(Ukraine) Anastasiia Zubkova	4.2	8.950		13.150	3.8	8.900		12.700	12.925	R2
11	(Austria) Leni Bohle	4.2	9.100		13.300	3.6	8.900		12.500	12.900	R3

==== Uneven bars ====
Rank	Gymnast	D Score	E Score	Pen.	Total	Qual.
1	(Germany) Helen Kevric	5.4	7.950		13.350	Q
2	(Germany) Meolie Maria Jauch	5.5	7.850		13.350	Q
3	(Sweden) Elina Gravin	4.9	8.350		13.250	Q
4	(Italy) Martina Pieratti	5.6	7.650		13.250	Q
5	(Ukraine) Anna Lashchevska	5.3	7.750		13.050	Q
6	(Romania) Amalia Ghigoarță	5.0	8.000		13.000	Q
7	(France) Lilou Viallat	4.8	8.050		12.850	Q
8	(Czech Republic) Vanesa Masova	4.9	7.750		12.650	Q
9	(Slovakia) Lucia Dobrocka	4.7	7.900		12.600	R1
10	(Romania) Amalia Puflea	5.3	7.200		12.500	R2
11	(France) Ambre Frotte	4.2	8.200		12.400	R3

==== Balance beam ====
Rank	Gymnast	D Score	E Score	Pen.	Total	Qual.
1	(France) Lilou Viallat	4.6	8.400		13.000	Q
2	(Romania) Amalia Puflea	5.3	7.600		12.900	Q
3	(Ukraine) Anna Lashchevska	5.4	7.500		12.900	Q
4	(Czech Republic) Sona Artamonova	4.8	8.000		12.800	Q
5	(Sweden) Elina Gravin	4.7	7.900		12.600	Q
6	(Italy) Arianna Grillo	4.8	7.750		12.550	Q
7	(Italy) Martina Pieratti	4.9	7.650		12.550	Q
8	(France) Lana Pondart	4.7	7.800		12.500	Q
9	(Austria) Leni Bohle	4.6	7.850		12.450	R1
10	(Hungary) Bettina Lili Czifra	4.7	7.700		12.400	R2
11	(Slovakia) Lucia Dobrocka	4.8	7.550		12.350	R3

==== Floor ====
Rank	Gymnast	D Score	E Score	Pen.	Total	Qual.
1	(Italy) July Marano	5.0	8.000		13.000	Q
2	(Romania) Amalia Puflea	5.1	7.900		13.000	Q
3	(Germany) Helen Kevric	5.0	7.850		12.850	Q
4	(Romania) Sabrina Voinea	4.9	7.750		12.650	Q
5	(France) Lilou Viallat	4.4	8.200		12.600	Q
6	(Romania) Amalia Ghigoarță	4.7	7.900		12.600	–
7	(United Kingdom) Abigail Martin	5.0	7.450		12.450	Q
8	(Switzerland) Samira Raffin	4.4	8.000		12.400	Q
9	(Ukraine) Anastasiia Zubkova	4.6	7.800		12.400	Q
10	(Italy) Arianna Grillo	4.8	7.850	-0.3	12.350	R1
11	(Germany) Meolie Maria Jauch	4.6	7.750		12.350	R2
12	(Switzerland) Kiara Raffin	4.2	8.050		12.250	R3
