= Tommaso Brugnami =

Italian gymnast

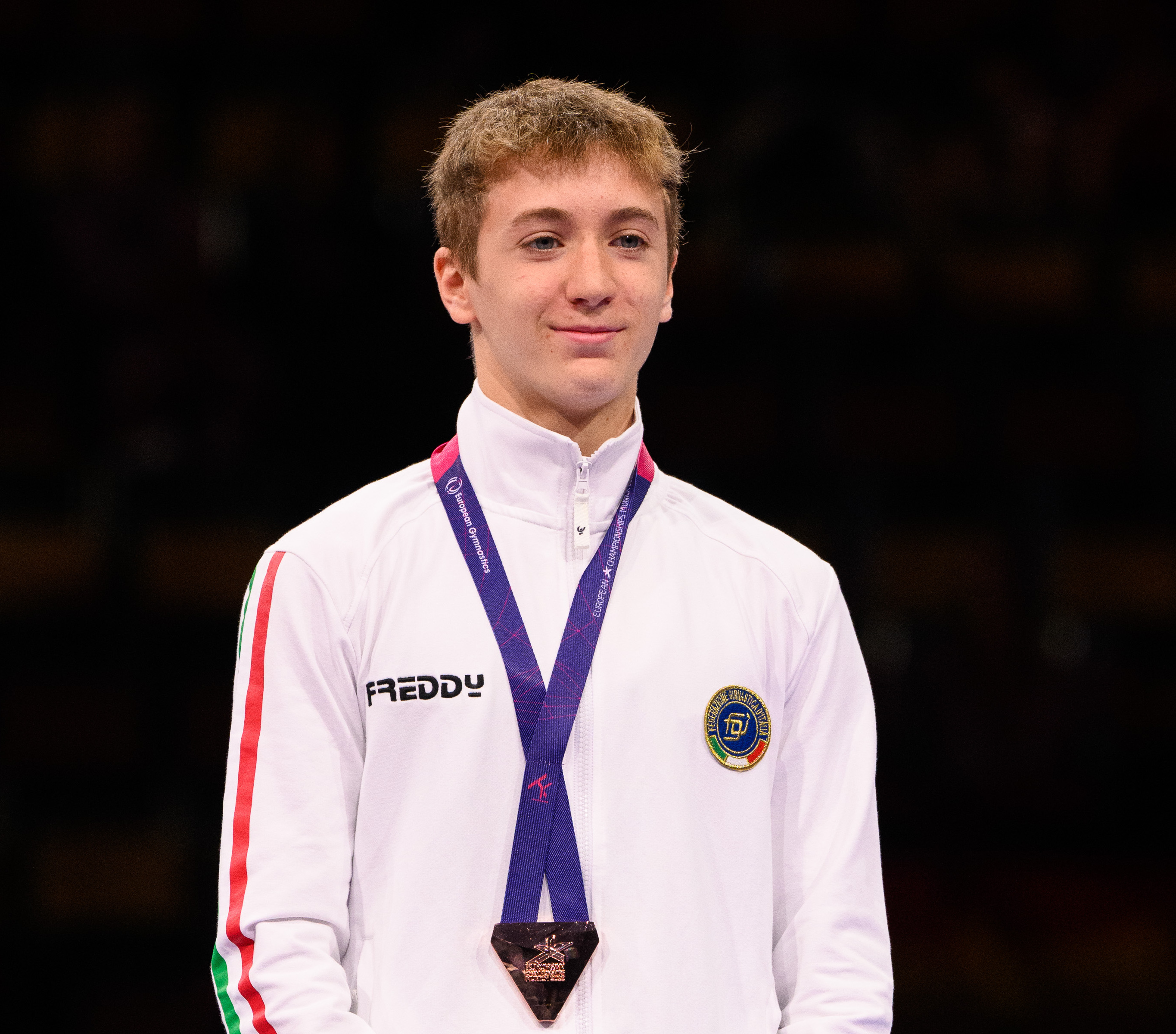
- Brugnami at the 2022 European Championships

Personal information
- Full name: Tommaso Brugmani
- Born: 19 September 2006 (age 20) Ascoli Piceno, Italy

Gymnastics career
- Discipline: Men's artistic gymnastics
- Country represented: Italy; (2022–present)
- Club: Associazione Ginnastica Giovanile Ancona ASD
- Head coach: Fabrizio Marcotullio
Medal record
Men's artistic gymnastics
Representing Italy
Mediterranean Games
Silver medal – second place	2026 Taranto	Team
Silver medal – second place	2026 Taranto	Vault
Junior World Championships
Gold medal – first place	2023 Antalya	Vault
Bronze medal – third place	2023 Antalya	Team
Bronze medal – third place	2023 Antalya	Floor exercise

Tommaso Brugnami (born 19 September 2006) is an Italian artistic gymnast. He is the 2023 Junior World Champion on vault.

== Personal life ==
Brugnami was born in Ascoli Piceno in 2006.

== Gymnastics career ==
=== 2022 ===
In late July, Brugnami competed at the European Youth Olympic Festival alongside Davide Oppizzio and Riccardo Villa, and they won gold as a team. Individually Brugnami won bronze on vault. In August, Brugnami competed at the European Championships where he helped Italy win gold as a team. Individually, he won bronze on floor exercise.

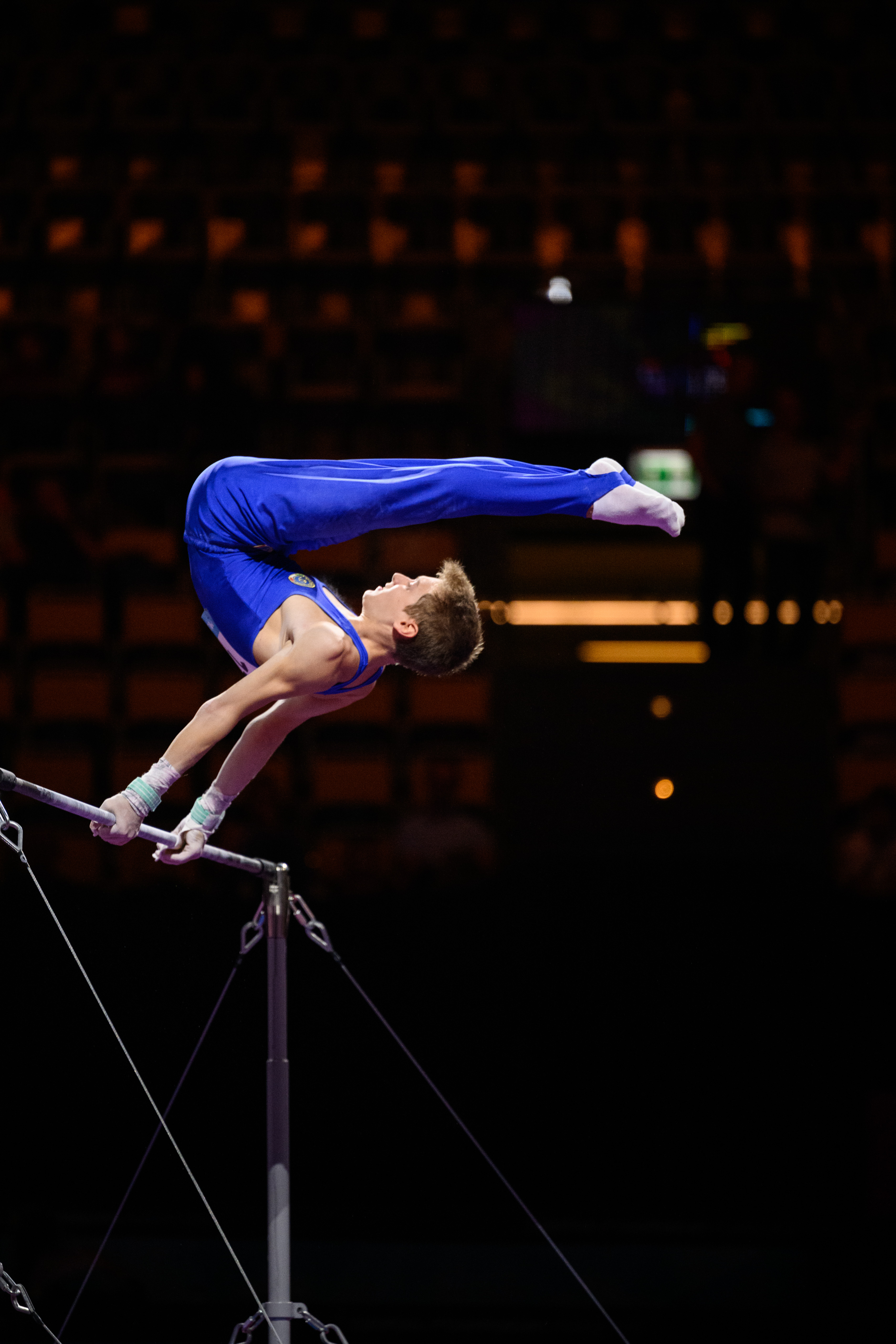
High bar

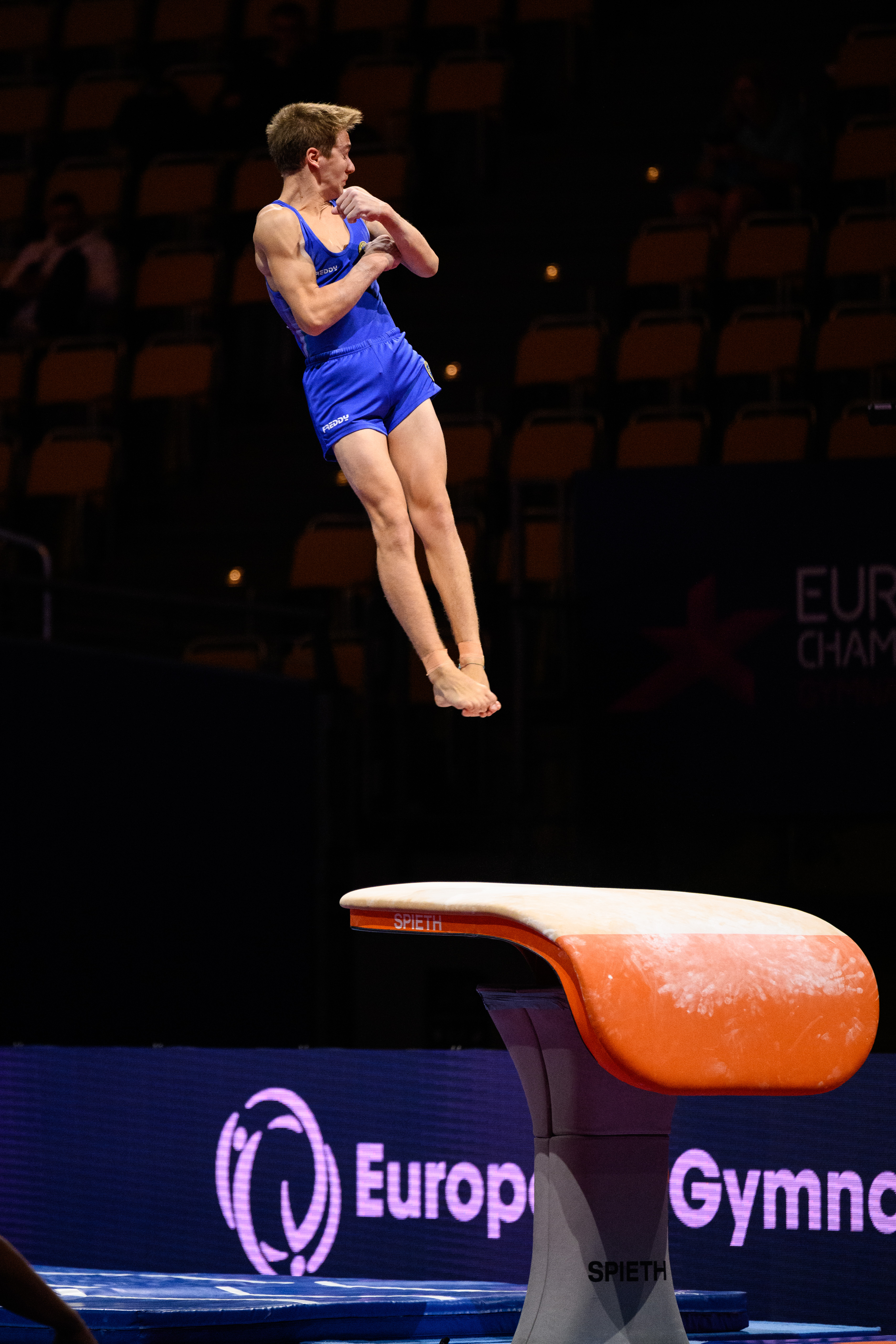
Vault

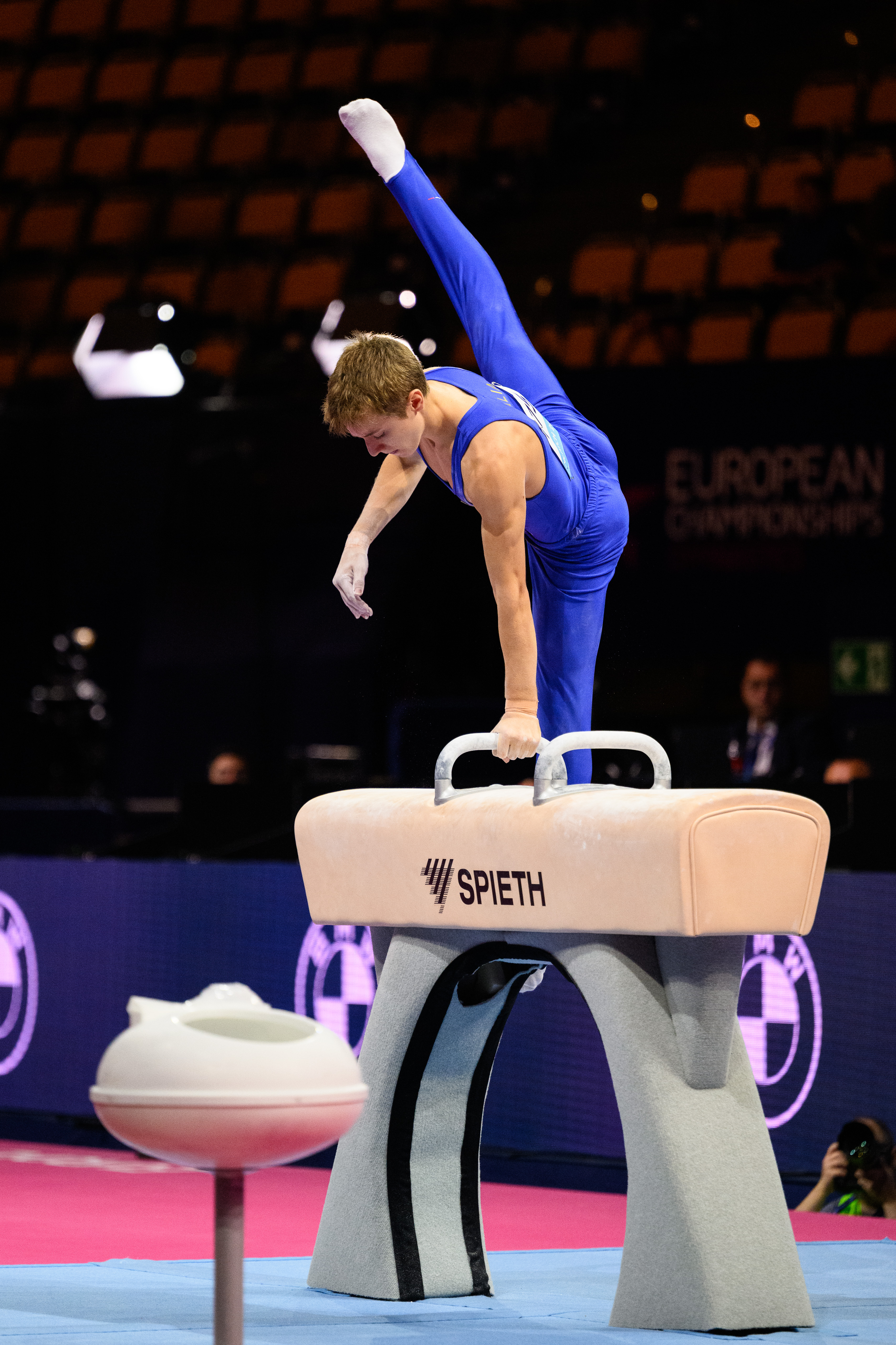
Pommel horse

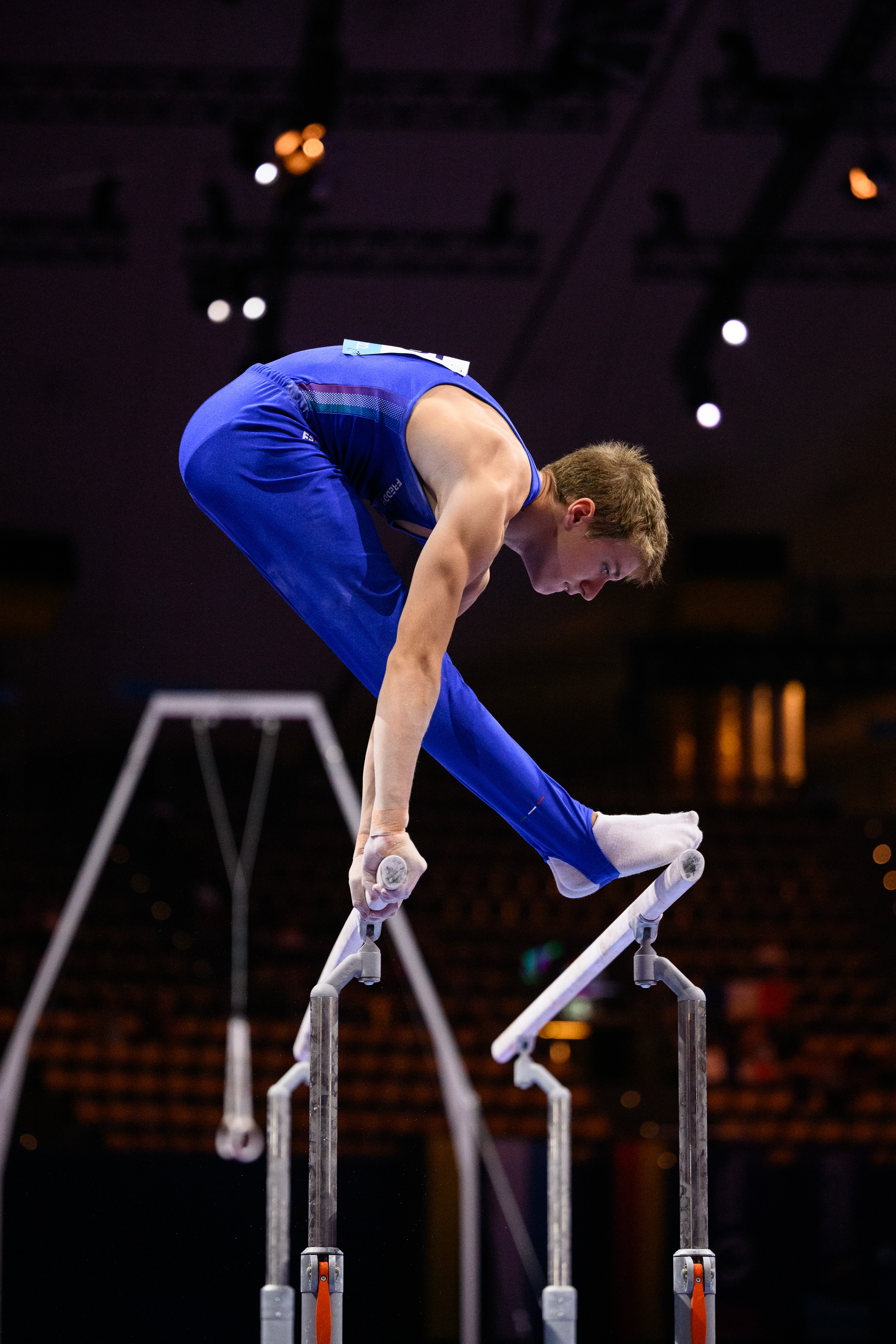
Parallel bars

Brugnami at the 2022 European Championships

=== 2023 ===
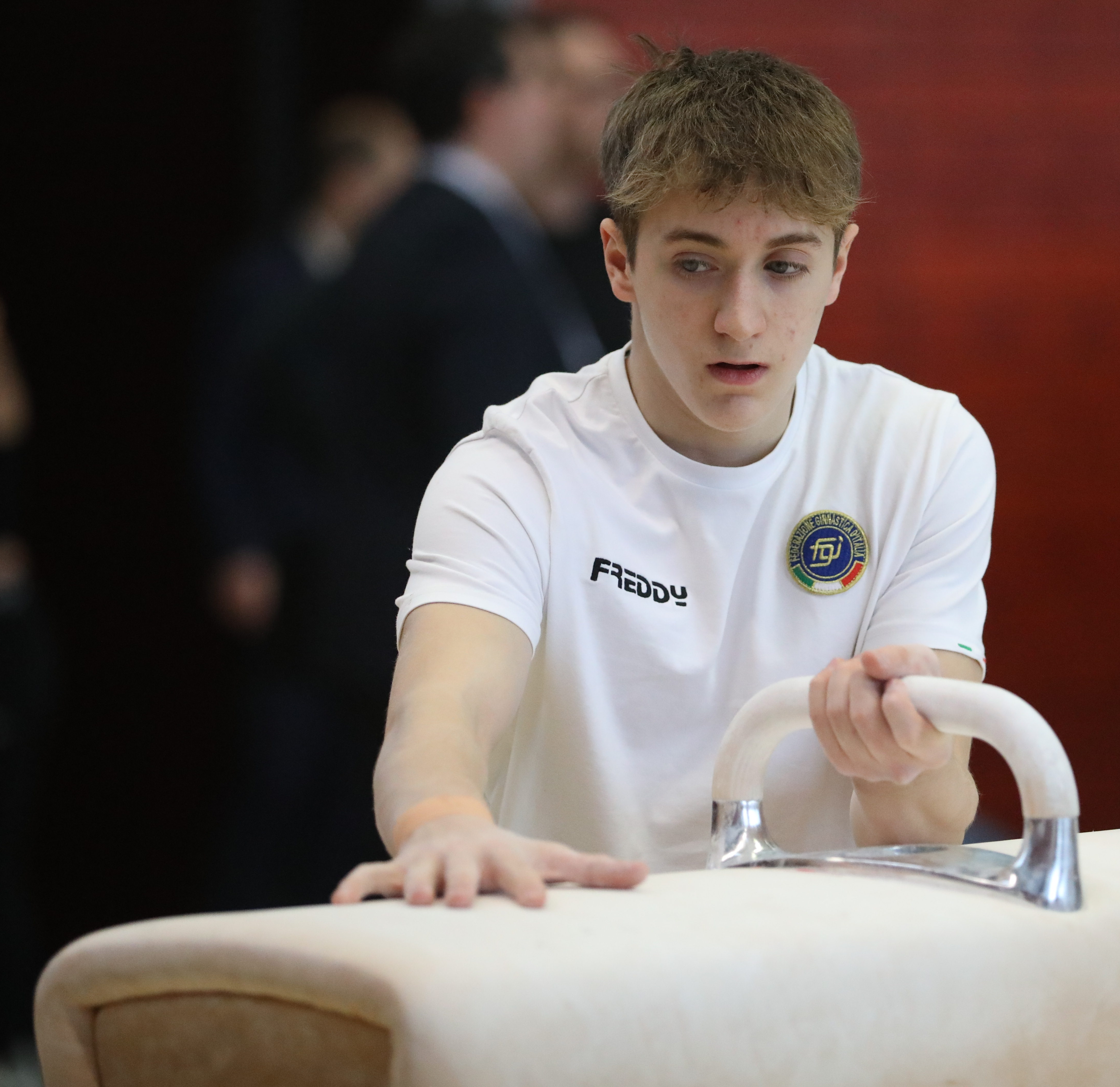
Brugnami at the Luxembourg Open 2023

In late March Brugnami, competed at the second Junior World Championships. On the first day of competition he helped Italy win the bronze medal behind Japan and China. During the all-around final Brugnami placed 13th. During the event finals, he won gold in the vault and bronze in the floor exercise.

In July, Brugnami competed at the European Youth Olympic Festival alongside Diego Vazzola and Manuel Berettera. Together, they won silver as a team behind Great Britain. Individually Brugnami won gold in the all-around. In the mixed pairs event, Brugnami was paired with Sara Caputo; they won gold ahead of the German team of Mert Öztürk and Helen Kevric. During individual event finals Brugnami won gold in floor exercise and vault and silver in rings.

=== 2024 ===
Brugnami competed at the 2024 DTB Pokal Team Challenge where he helped Italy place second behind the United States. Individually he won gold on floor exercise and vault. He next competed at the 2024 European Championships where he helped Italy win the silver medal behind France. Individually Brugnami placed second in the all-around behind Anthony Mansard. During event finals Brugnami won gold on floor exercise and rings and placed second on vault behind Sol Scott.

=== 2025 ===
Brugnami began competing at the senior level in 2025. He made his senior World debut at the 2025 World Championships where he placed fourth on vault, 0.017 points behind bronze medalist Nazar Chepurnyi.

== Competitive history ==
Competitive history of Tommaso Brugnami at the junior level
Year	Event	Team	AA	FX	PH	SR	VT	PB	HB
2022	DTB Pokal Team Challenge	3rd place, bronze medalist(s)		3rd place, bronze medalist(s)			3rd place, bronze medalist(s)		
2022	European Youth Olympic Festival	1st place, gold medalist(s)	10	5			3rd place, bronze medalist(s)		
2022	European Championships	1st place, gold medalist(s)	7	3rd place, bronze medalist(s)			4		
2022	Swiss Cup Juniors	1st place, gold medalist(s)	2nd place, silver medalist(s)						
2023	Luxembourg Open	1st place, gold medalist(s)	2nd place, silver medalist(s)	1st place, gold medalist(s)	4		1st place, gold medalist(s)		
2023	Junior World Championships	3rd place, bronze medalist(s)	13	3rd place, bronze medalist(s)			1st place, gold medalist(s)		
2023	European Youth Olympic Festival	2nd place, silver medalist(s)	1st place, gold medalist(s)	1st place, gold medalist(s)		2nd place, silver medalist(s)	1st place, gold medalist(s)		
2023	EYOF Mixed Pairs	1st place, gold medalist(s)							
2024	DTB Pokal Team Challenge	2nd place, silver medalist(s)		1st place, gold medalist(s)			1st place, gold medalist(s)		
2024	European Championships	2nd place, silver medalist(s)	2nd place, silver medalist(s)	1st place, gold medalist(s)		1st place, gold medalist(s)	2nd place, silver medalist(s)		

Competitive history of Tommaso Brugnami at the senior level
Year	Event	Team	AA	FX	PH	SR	VT	PB	HB
2025	Cairo World Cup						6		
2025	Givet Friendly	1st place, gold medalist(s)							
2025	Italian Championships			1st place, gold medalist(s)	4		1st place, gold medalist(s)		
2025	World Championships	—N/a					4		
2026	Cottbus World Cup						6		
2026	DTB Pokal Team Challenge	3rd place, bronze medalist(s)					2nd place, silver medalist(s)		
2026	Italian Championships		11	5			6		
2026	Mediterranean Games	2nd place, silver medalist(s)	6				2nd place, silver medalist(s)		
2026	Paris World Challenge Cup			3rd place, bronze medalist(s)			3rd place, bronze medalist(s)		
