= Helen Kevric =

German artistic gymnast

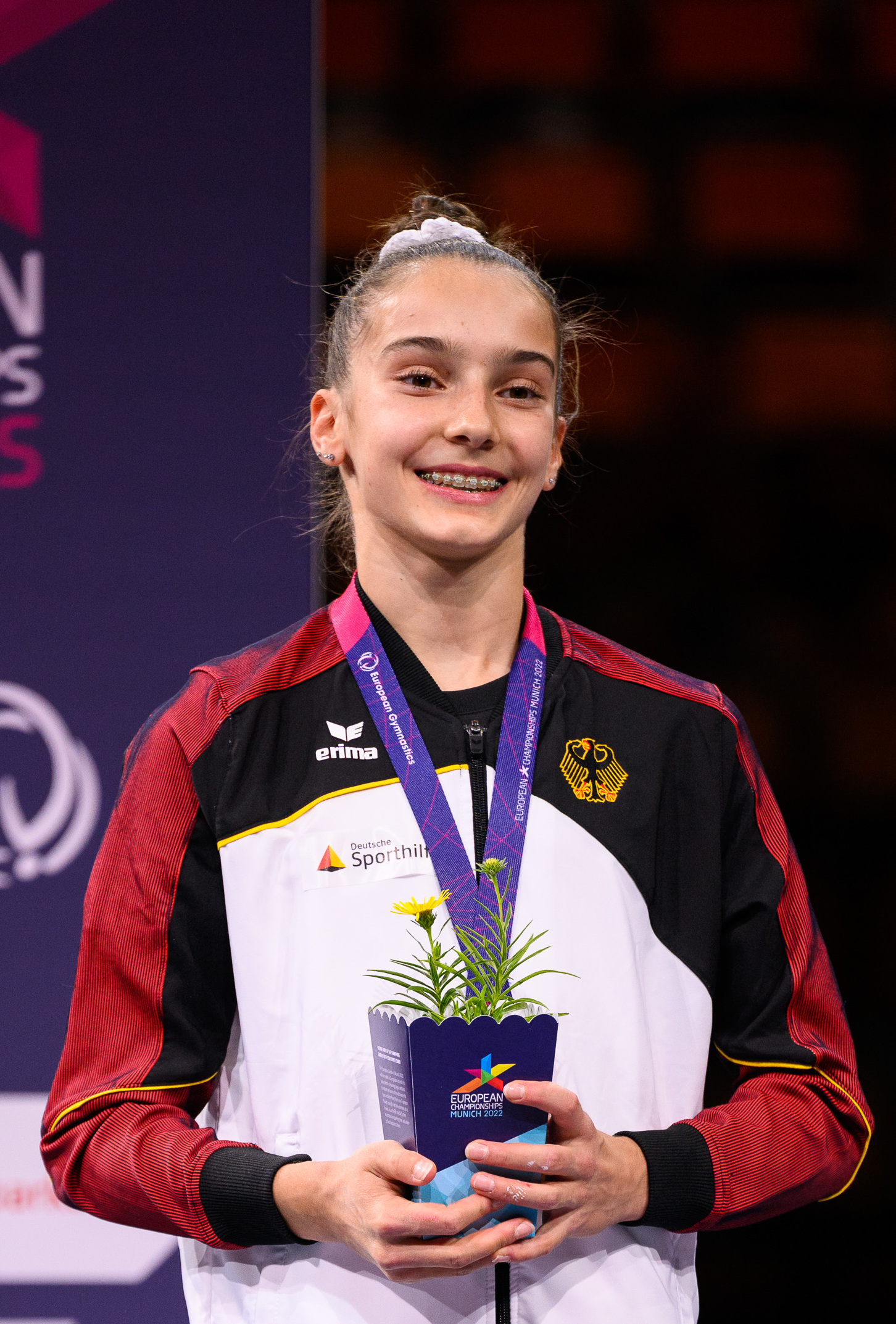
- Kevric at the 2022 European Championships

Personal information
- Full name: Helen Kevric
- Born: 21 March 2008 (age 18) Ruit, district of Ostfildern, Baden-Württemberg, Germany
- Relatives: Adnan Kevrić (father)

Gymnastics career
- Discipline: Women's artistic gymnastics
- Country represented: Germany; (2021–present)
- Club: MTV Stuttgart
- Gym: Kunst-Turn-Forum Stuttgart
- Head coach: Giacomo Camiciotti
- Assistant coach: Marie-Luise May
- Former coach: Janina Schumbera
- Choreographer: Elena Dolgopolova
Medal record
Artistic gymnastics
Representing Germany
World Championships
Silver medal – second place	2026 Rotterdam	Uneven bars
European Championships
Gold medal – first place	2026 Zagreb	Uneven bars
Silver medal – second place	2025 Leipzig	Team
Junior World Championships
Silver medal – second place	2023 Antalya	Uneven bars

Helen Kevric (born 21 March 2008) is a German artistic gymnast. She is the 2026 European uneven bars champion. Kevric also won silver medals on uneven bars at the 2026 World and 2023 Junior World Championships. She represented Germany at the 2024 Summer Olympics.

== Early life ==
Kevric is the daughter of a German mother Bettina and father Adnan Kevrić, a former Bosnian professional footballer. Her talent was recognized at the age of four at her home club TV Nellingen (division SV Ostfildern). With increased support and training demands, she moved to MTV Stuttgart, the training itself currently takes place at the Kunst-Turn-Forum Stuttgart.

== Junior gymnastics career ==
=== 2020–21 ===
In 2020 Kevric competed at the Pre-Olympic Youth Cup where she placed first in the espoir division. She next competed at the German National Championships where she placed first in the junior-2008 division. Additionally she placed first on all four apparatuses.

At the 2021 German National Championships Kevric repeated her results from the year prior, winning the all-around and all four apparatuses titles in the junior-2008 division. Kevric next competed at the Swiss Cup Juniors where she placed first in the all-around and helped the German team place first. She ended the year winning gold at the Tournoi International. Additionally she helped Germany place second as a team and won three additional apparatus medals.

=== 2022 ===
Kevric competed at the DTB Pokal Team Challenge where she recorded the highest all-around score. She helped Germany place fourth as a team and individually she won silver on uneven bars behind Miella Brown of Australia. She next competed at the City of Jesolo Trophy where she placed seventh in the all-around but won gold on uneven bars and bronze on floor exercise. At the German National Championships Kevric won the all-around in the junior-2008 division for the third consecutive year. She next competed at the European Youth Olympic Festival where she helped Germany win silver behind Romania. Individually she won gold in the all-around and on vault and won silver on uneven bars and floor exercise. Additionally she competed in the mixed pairs competition alongside Jukka Nissinen. They won silver behind the Italian pair of Riccardo Villa and Arianna Grillo.

At the 2022 European Championships in Munich, Kevric became the European junior all-around champion, and helped the German junior team win the bronze medal behind Italy and Romania. She also won the silver medal on the uneven bars; on the other three apparatuses, for which she was also qualified, she did not compete in order to save herself for the upcoming World Championships.

=== 2023 ===
Kevric competed at the 2023 Junior World Championships alongside Marlene Gotthardt and Silja Stöhr; they placed seventh as a team. Despite a foot injury sustained in training, Kevric still qualified for the final on uneven bars, where she won the silver medal behind Caterina Gaddi of Italy. At the German Championships Kevric won gold in the all-around and on uneven bars and floor exercise.

In July Kevric was selected to compete at the European Youth Olympic Festival alongside Gotthardt and Lisa Wötzel. During the team and all-around final Kevric helped Germany place second as a team and individually she defended her all-around title from the previous year. During the mixed pairs event she was teamed with Mert Öztürk; they finished second behind the Italian pair of Sara Caputo and Tommaso Brugnami. On vault Kevric won silver with a minimal gap of 0.016 points behind Italy's Sara Caputo; this was preceded by a questionable scoring to the disadvantage of Kevric (a protest note was waived), which even led the Italian team to apologize personally to the Germans. Kevric then performed to first place on each of the other three individual apparatuses — first on the uneven bars with competition top score, and the following day on the balance beam as well as the floor. With four gold and three silver medals, she advanced to the most successful multi-medal winner of the entire festival.

In October 2023 has been named the Junior Athlete of the year by the German Sports Aid Foundation (Sporthilfe). She received that award at Areal Böhler in Düsseldorf.

== Senior gymnastics career ==
=== 2024 ===
Kevric became age-eligible for senior level competition in 2024. She made her senior international debut at the European Championships in May. During the qualification round she only competed on the uneven bars and helped Germany qualify to the team final and individually she qualified to the uneven bars final where she ultimately finished fourth. In June Kevric competed at her first senior-level national championships. She won the all-around with a score of 55.500, just under four points ahead of second-place finisher Sarah Voss. During event finals Kevric won silver on uneven bars and balance beam behind Elisabeth Seitz and Voss respectively, and won gold on floor exercise. Later that month Kevric competed at the final Olympic qualification event; she won the all-around and upgraded her uneven bars routine to finish ahead of Seitz. At the conclusion of the event Kevric was awarded the non-nominative Olympic berth.

At the 2024 Olympic Games Kevric qualified to the all-around and uneven bars finals. During the all-around final Kevric finished eighth overall. In doing so she became the highest placing reunified-German gymnast in an Olympic all-around final, surpassing Oksana Chusovitina and Seitz's 9th-place finishes in 2008 and 2020 respectively. During the uneven bars final Kevric placed sixth.

=== 2025 ===
Kevric competed at the 2025 European Championships where she helped Germany win the team silver medal, their highest team placement at a European Championships. Individually Kevric qualified to the all-around final in third and the uneven bars final in first. During the all-around final Kevric injured her patellar tendon when landing her vault and had to withdraw from the competition as well as the uneven bars final. She immediately underwent surgery to reattach the ligament.

=== 2026 ===
Kevric at the 2026 World Championships

Kevric returned to competition at the 2026 German National Championships. She only competed on uneven bars and balance beam but won the national title on both. She was selected to compete at the 2026 European Championships alongside Karina Schönmaier, Pauline Schäfer-Betz, Silja Stöhr, and Lea Marie Quaas. During event finals Kevric won gold on the uneven bars, earning her first senior level European title. On the final day of the competition, Kevric helped Germany finish fifth as a team.

In October, Kevric was named to the German team for the 2026 World Championships in Rotterdam. She qualified to the uneven bars final where she won the silver medal behind Kaylia Nemour, earning the best World placement on the apparatus by a German athlete (post reunification).

== Competitive history ==
Competitive history of Helen Kevric at the junior level
Year	Event	Team	AA	VT	UB	BB	FX
2020	Pre-Olympic Youth Cup		1st place, gold medalist(s)				
2020	German Championships (espoir)		1st place, gold medalist(s)	1st place, gold medalist(s)	1st place, gold medalist(s)	1st place, gold medalist(s)	1st place, gold medalist(s)
2021	German Junior Meet		1st place, gold medalist(s)				
2021	German Championships		1st place, gold medalist(s)	1st place, gold medalist(s)	1st place, gold medalist(s)	1st place, gold medalist(s)	1st place, gold medalist(s)
2021	Swiss Cup Juniors	1st place, gold medalist(s)	1st place, gold medalist(s)				
2021	Tournoi International	2nd place, silver medalist(s)	1st place, gold medalist(s)	3rd place, bronze medalist(s)	1st place, gold medalist(s)	1st place, gold medalist(s)	6
2022	DTB Pokal Team Challenge	4			2nd place, silver medalist(s)		
2022	City of Jesolo Trophy	5	7		1st place, gold medalist(s)		3rd place, bronze medalist(s)
2022	German Championships		1st place, gold medalist(s)		1st place, gold medalist(s)	1st place, gold medalist(s)	
2022	European Youth Olympic Festival	2nd place, silver medalist(s)	1st place, gold medalist(s)	1st place, gold medalist(s)	2nd place, silver medalist(s)		2nd place, silver medalist(s)
2022	European Championships	3rd place, bronze medalist(s)	1st place, gold medalist(s)	WD	2nd place, silver medalist(s)	WD	WD
2023	DTB Pokal Team Challenge	1st place, gold medalist(s)					
2023	Junior World Championships	7			2nd place, silver medalist(s)		
2023	German Championships		1st place, gold medalist(s)		1st place, gold medalist(s)		1st place, gold medalist(s)
2023	Épernay Friendly	1st place, gold medalist(s)	1st place, gold medalist(s)				
2023	European Youth Olympic Festival	2nd place, silver medalist(s)	1st place, gold medalist(s)	2nd place, silver medalist(s)	1st place, gold medalist(s)	1st place, gold medalist(s)	1st place, gold medalist(s)

Competitive history of Helen Kevric at the senior level
Year	Event	Team	AA	VT	UB	BB	FX
2024
2024	European Championships	6			4		
2024	German Championships		1st place, gold medalist(s)		2nd place, silver medalist(s)	2nd place, silver medalist(s)	1st place, gold medalist(s)
2024	Olympic Games		8		6		
2025
2025	European Championships	2nd place, silver medalist(s)	DNF		WD		
2026	German Championships				1st place, gold medalist(s)	1st place, gold medalist(s)	
2026	European Championships	5			1st place, gold medalist(s)		
2026	World Championships	10			2nd place, silver medalist(s)		

=== Mixed events ===
Mixed events are not typically held at Artistic Gymnastics competitions. Some competitions, such as the European Youth Olympic Festival, have started including this event in addition to the other contested events.

Competitive history of Helen Kevric in mixed events
Year	Event	Teammate(s)	Result
2022	European Youth Olympic Festival Mixed Pairs	Jukka Ole Nissinen	2nd place, silver medalist(s)
2023	European Youth Olympic Festival Mixed Pairs	Mert Öztürk	2nd place, silver medalist(s)
