= Elina Gravin =

Swedish gymnast (born 2007)

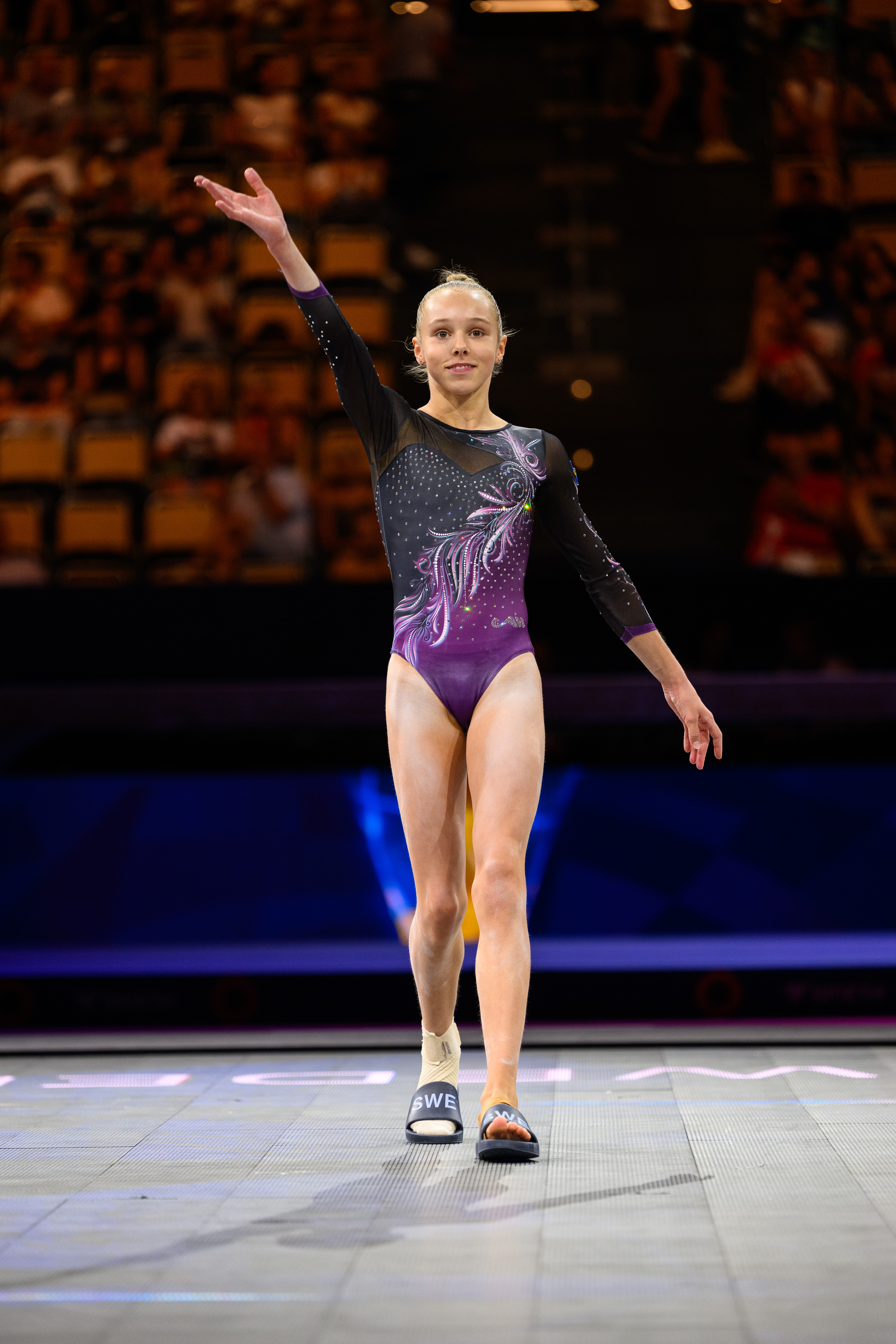
- Gravin at the 2022 Junior European Championships

Personal information
- Full name: Elina Elisabeth Gravin
- Alternative name: Elina Grawin
- Born: 25 January 2007 (age 19) Hässelby, Sweden

Gymnastics career
- Discipline: Women's artistic gymnastics
- Country represented: Sweden
- Club: Eskilstuna Gymnastics Association
- Head coach: Helena Andersson Melander

Elina Elisabeth Gravin (born 25 January 2007) is a Swedish artistic gymnast. She is the 2025 Swedish all-around champion.

== Gymnastic career ==
Gravin began gymnastics when she was five years old because her mother was a former gymnast. She moved from Stockholm to Eskilstuna in 2018 to improve her training.

=== Junior ===
Gravin made her international debut at the 2021 FIT Challenge in Ghent, Belgium. There, she finished seventh in the all-around, fourth on both the uneven bars and balance beam, and eighth on the floor exercise. She then won the junior all-around, uneven bars, and floor exercise titles at the 2021 Swedish Championships. She won the uneven bars title at the 2021 Nordic Junior Championships and also helped Sweden win the team bronze medal. Then at the 2021 Gymnova Cup in Keerbergen, Belgium, she won the junior all-around title.

Gravin successfully defended her Nordic junior uneven bars title in 2022. She placed sixth in the all-around at the 2022 European Youth Olympic Festival. She also qualified for the uneven bars and balance beam finals, finishing eighth and fourth, respectively. She then finished fourth on the uneven bars and sixth on the floor exercise at the 2022 Junior European Championships.

=== Senior ===
Gravin became age-eligible for senior competitions in 2023. She advanced to the floor exercise final at the 2023 Doha World Cup and finished sixth. She only competed on the uneven bars at the 2023 European Championships due to an illness and fell. The Swedish team still finished 10th and qualified for the 2023 World Championships. There, she helped the Swedish team finish 18th.

Gravin competed at the 2024 European Championships with the Swedish team that advanced to the team final for the first time and placed eighth. She only competed on the balance beam at the 2024 Swedish Championships, finishing fourth.

Gravin won her first senior national all-around title at the 2025 Swedish Championships. She then competed with the Swedish team that achieved a best-ever seventh-place finish at the 2025 European Championships.
