= Artistic gymnastics at the 2026 Mediterranean Games – Men's vault =

Men's vault at the 2026 Mediterranean Games
- Venue: Grottaglie Sports Hall
- Date: 2 September 2026
- Competitors: 8 from 7 nations
- Winning total: 14.025

Medalists
gold medal	(Morocco) Hamza Hossaini
silver medal	(Italy) Tommaso Brugnami
bronze medal	(Turkey) Alperen Ege Avcı

The Men's vault competition at the 2026 Mediterranean Games was held on 2 September 2026 at the Grottaglie Sports Hall.

== Qualification ==
Rank	Gymnast	Vault 1					Vault 2					Total	Notes
Rank	Gymnast	D Score	E Score	Pen.	Bon.	Score 1	D Score	E Score	Pen.	Bon.	Score 2	Total	Notes
1	Tommaso Brugnami (ITA)	4.4	9.100			13.500	4.8	8.850	-0.1		13.550	13.525	Q
2	Hamza Hossaini (MAR)	4.8	9.400			14.200	4.8	7.900			12.700	13.450	Q
3	Niccolò Vannucchi (ITA)	4.8	9.200		0.1	14.100	4.8	7.850			12.650	13.375	Q
4	Sergio Kovacs (ESP)	4.8	8.850	-0.3		13.350	4.4	8.800			13.200	13.275	Q
5	Neofytos Kyriakou (CYP)	4.8	8.200	-0.3		12.700	4.4	9.100			13.500	13.100	Q
6	Antonin Delaye (FRA)	4.8	8.900			13.700	2.8	9.400			12.200	12.950	Q
7	Moetamen Jelassi (TUN)	4.4	8.700			13.100	4.8	8.300	-0.3		12.800	12.950	Q
8	Alperen Ege Avcı (TUR)	4.4	9.200	-0.1		13.500	4.8	7.850	-0.3		12.350	12.925	Q
9	Lorenzo Aymes (FRA)	4.8	8.900			13.700	2.4	9.550			11.950	12.825	R1
10	Mhd Talal Blidy (SYR)	2.4	8.600			11.000	2.4	9.150			11.550	11.275	R2

== Final ==
Rank	Gymnast	Vault 1					Vault 2					Total
Rank	Gymnast	D Score	E Score	Pen.	Bon.	Score 1	D Score	E Score	Pen.	Bon.	Score 2	Total
1st place, gold medalist(s)	Hamza Hossaini (MAR)	5.2	8.900			14.100	4.8	9.150			13.950	14.025
2nd place, silver medalist(s)	Tommaso Brugnami (ITA)	4.8	9.250			14.050	4.8	8.950			13.750	13.900
3rd place, bronze medalist(s)	Alperen Ege Avcı (TUR)	4.8	9.150			13.950	4.4	9.350			13.750	13.850
4	Niccolò Vannucchi (ITA)	4.8	9.250			14.050	4.8	8.650			13.450	13.750
5	Neofytos Kyriakou (CYP)	4.8	9.150			13.950	4.4	8.950			13.350	13.650
6	Sergio Kovacs (ESP)	4.8	7.900	-0.3		12.400	4.4	9.200			13.600	13.000
7	Antonin Delaye (FRA)	4.8	9.050	-0.1		13.750	2.8	9.350			12.150	12.950
8	Moetamen Jelassi (TUN)	4.4	8.500			12.900	4.8	8.100			12.900	12.900
