= 2021 Nordic Junior Artistic Gymnastics Championships =

International gymnastics competition

2021 Junior Nordic Gymnastics Championships
- Location: Virtual
- Start date: 29 October 2021
- End date: 31 October 2021

The 2021 Nordic Junior Artistic Gymnastics Championships was an artistic gymnastics competition held virtually. The event was held between 29 and 31 October.

== Medalists ==
Event	Gold	Silver	Bronze
Men
Team all-around	Finland	Iceland	Denmark
Individual all-around	Joona Reiman (FIN)	Aaro Harju (FIN)	Dagur Ólafsson (ISL)
Floor	Kristian Danishevski (FIN)	Aaro Harju (FIN)	Sigurður Stefánsson (ISL)
Pommel horse	Dagur Ólafsson (ISL)	Akseli Kauma (FIN)	Aaro Harju (FIN)
Rings	Aaro Harju (FIN)	Joona Reiman (FIN)	Lukas Houser (SWE)
Vault	Joona Reiman (FIN)	Kristian Danishevski (FIN)	Sigurður Stefánsson (ISL)
Parallel bars	Joona Reiman (FIN)	Luis Melander (SWE)	Akseli Kauma (FIN)
Horizontal bar	Dagur Ólafsson (ISL)	Aleksi Vesala (FIN)	Filip Nielsen (DEN)
Women
Team all-around	Finland	Denmark	Sweden
Individual all-around	Olivia Vättö (FIN)	Anni Vuorikoski (FIN)	Natalie Jensen (DEN)
Vault	Olivia Vättö (FIN)	Sara Jacobsen (DEN)	Caroline Bertelsen (DEN)
Uneven bars	Elina Grawin (SWE)	Kiira Jokinen (FIN)	Jemina Phan (FIN)
Balance beam	Natalie Jensen (DEN)	Olivia Vättö (FIN)	Sara Laiho (FIN)
Floor	Anni Vuorikoski (FIN)	Ragnheiður Jóhannsdóttir (ISL)	Sara Jacobsen (DEN)
