= Chad women's national artistic gymnastics team =

National sports team

Chad women's gymnastics team
- Continental union: African Gymnastics Union

Olympic Games
- Appearances: 0

World Championships
- Appearances: 0

African Championships
- Appearances: 1

The Chad women's national artistic gymnastics team represents Chad in FIG international competitions.

== History ==
Chad gymnastics began when Ramón Grosso, son of Spanish footballer Ramón Grosso and president of the Fundación Ramón Grosso, introduced Father Camille, a Chadian Jesuit, to Sylvia García, president of Spanish gymnastics club CGA Pozuelo. Grosso, whose foundation was already supporting football and basketball in Chad, decided to began a program to support Chadian girls in gymnastics.

Chad officially became an affiliate member of the International Gymnastics Federation in May 2022. They fielded their first team at the 2024 African Championships where they placed fourth behind Egypt, South Africa, and Morocco.

== Team competition results ==
=== African Championships ===
- 2024 – 4th place
  Derib Achta, Cecilia Denemian, Grâce Fonai-Gna, Anne Marie Nodjilelmbaye

== Senior roster ==
Name	Birth date and age	Hometown
Derib Achta	2008	N'Djamena
Cecilia Denemian	2007	N'Djamena
Grâce Fonai-Gna	2007	N'Djamena
Anne Marie Nodjilelmbaye	2008	Moundou
