= Riccardo Villa =

Italian gymnast

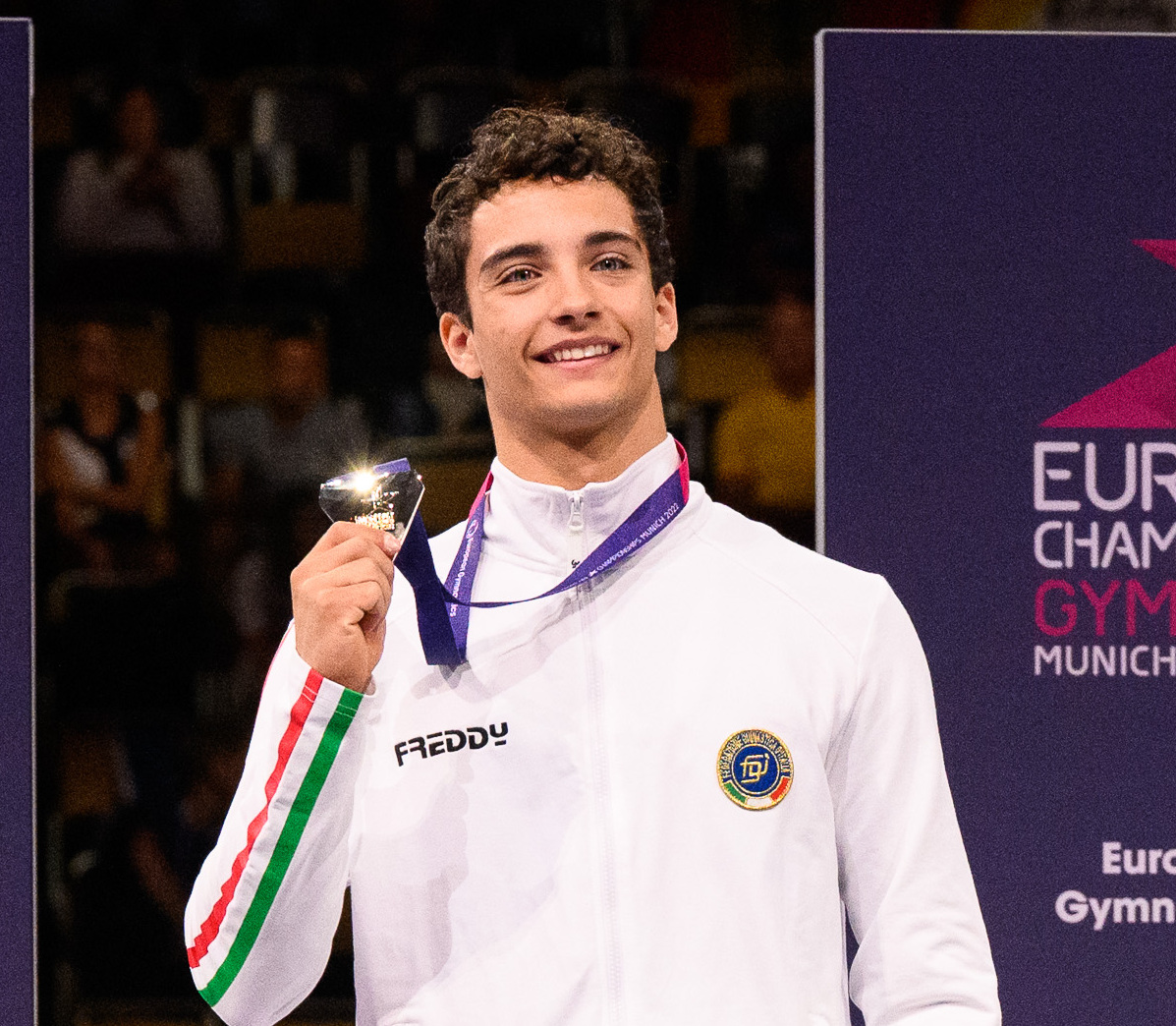
- Villa at the 2022 European Championships

Personal information
- Full name: Riccardo Villa
- Born: 5 January 2005 (age 21) Monza, Lombardy, Italy

Gymnastics career
- Discipline: Men's artistic gymnastics
- Country represented: Italy; (2019–present)
- Club: Ginnastica Pro Carate
- Head coach: Corrado Corti
Medal record
Men's artistic gymnastics
Representing Italy
Junior World Championships
Bronze medal – third place	2023 Antalya	Team
Bronze medal – third place	2023 Antalya	All-around
Bronze medal – third place	2023 Antalya	Rings
FIG World Cup
Event / 1st / 2nd / 3rd; World Challenge Cup / 1 / 0 / 0

Riccardo Villa (born 5 January 2005) is an Italian artistic gymnast. He is the 2023 Junior World all-around bronze medalist.

== Personal life ==
Villa was born in Monza in 2005.

== Gymnastics career ==
=== Junior: 2022–2023 ===
In late July 2022 Villa competed at the European Youth Olympic Festival where he helped Italy win gold as a team. Individually Villa won silver in the all-around behind Radomyr Stelmakh. Additionally he and teammate Arianna Grillo won gold in the mixed pairs portion of the competition. In August Villa competed at the European Championships where he helped Italy win gold as a team. Individually he won gold on pommel horse and placed sixth in the all-around.

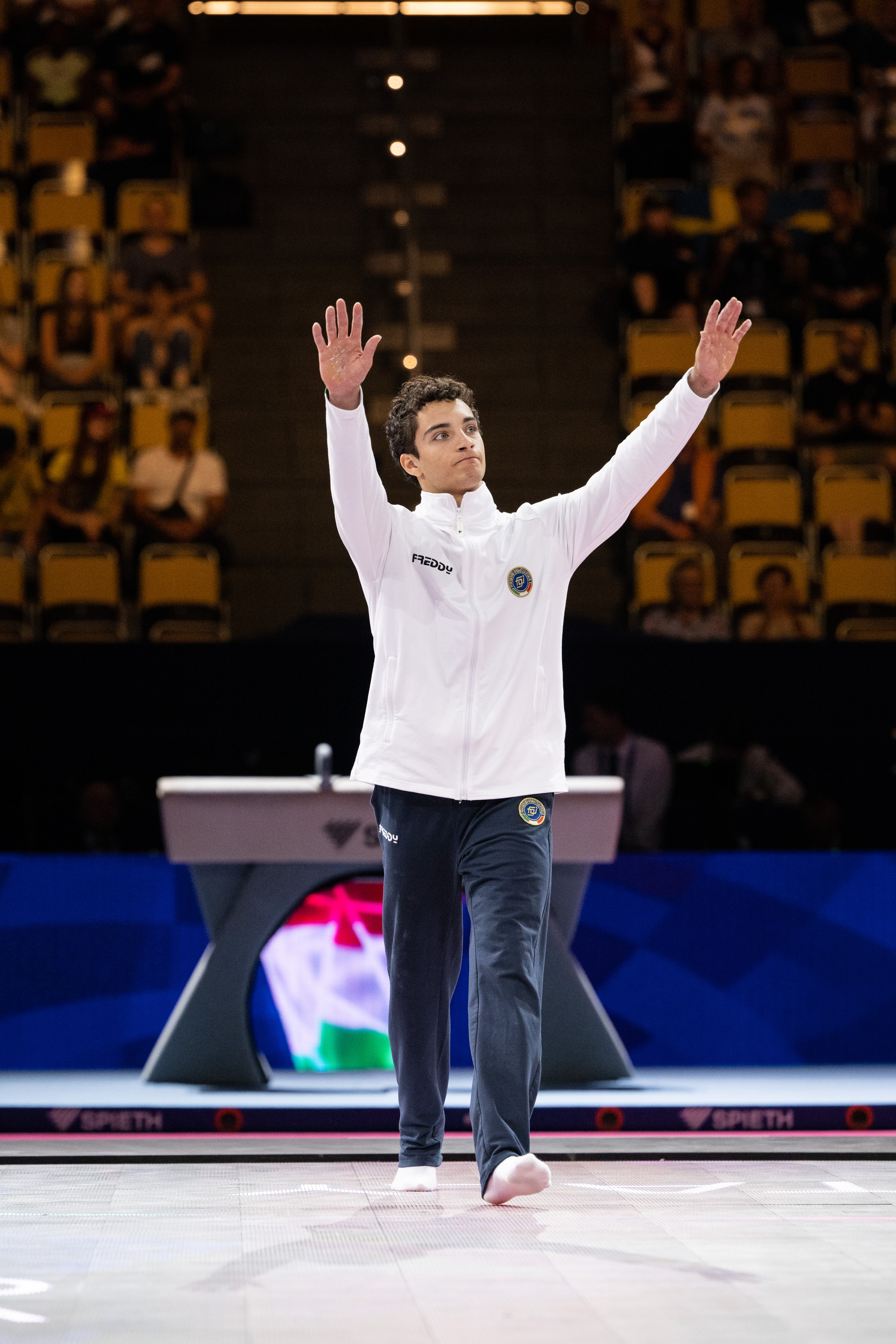
Introduction

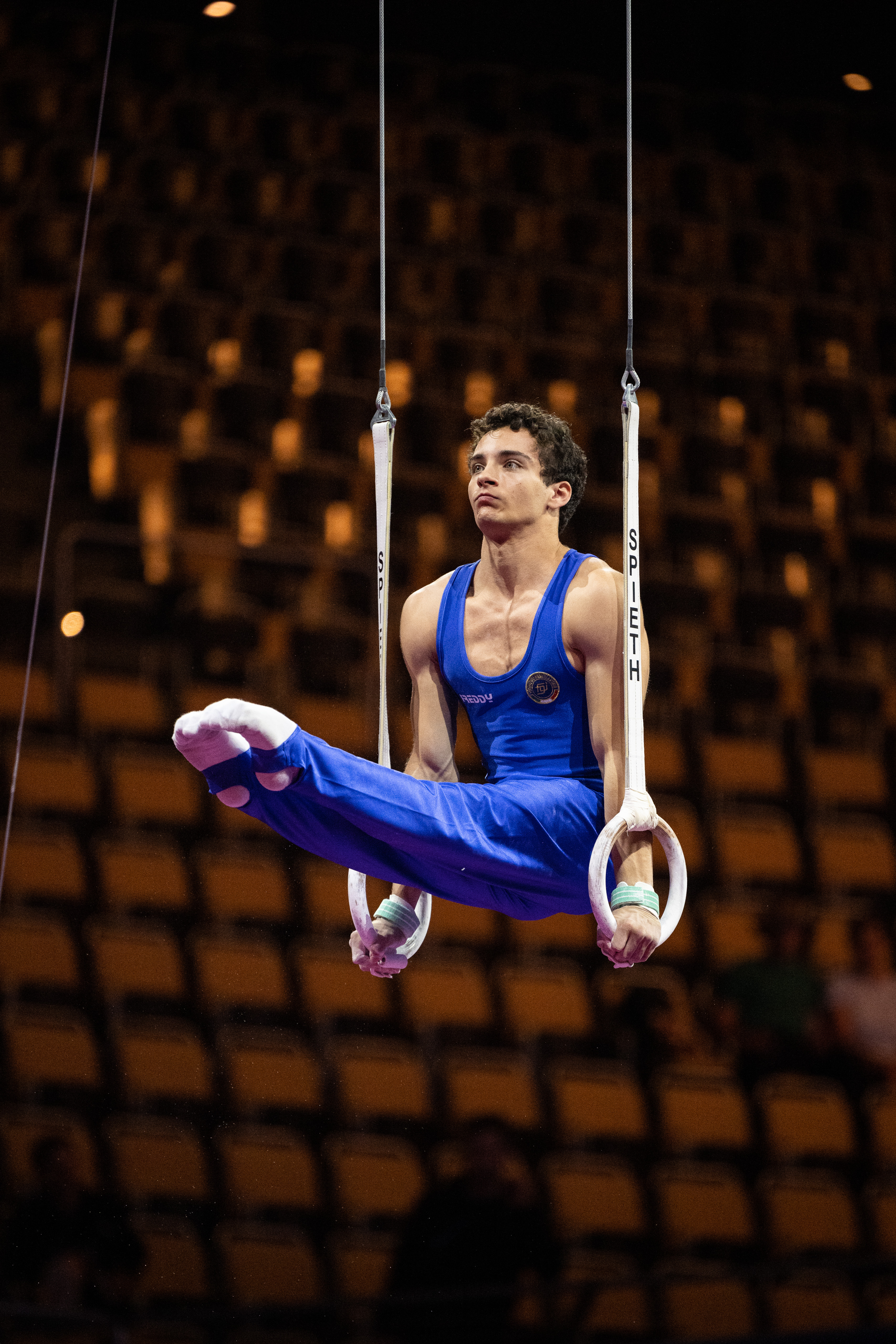
Rings

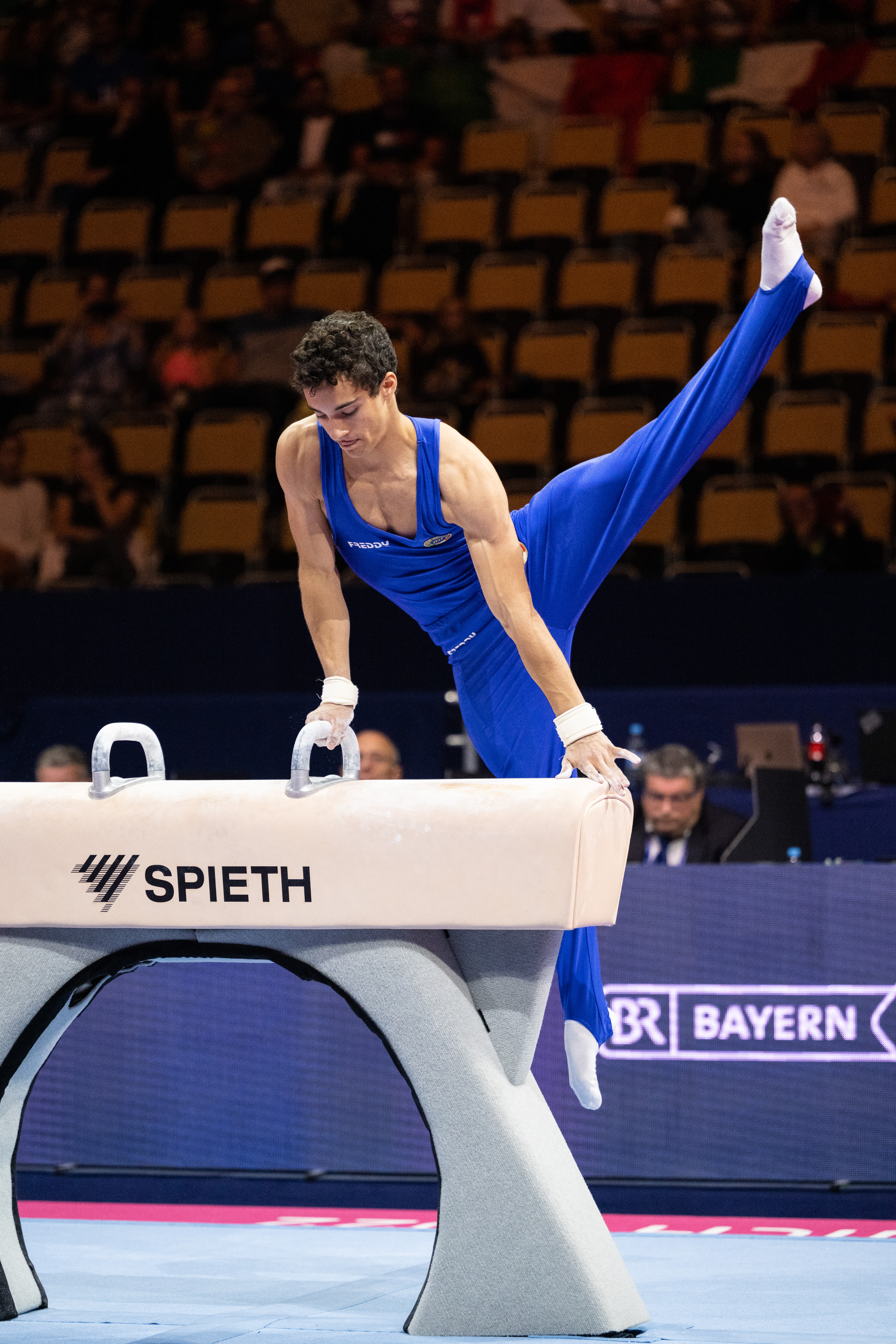
Pommel horse

Villa at the 2022 European Championships

In March 2023 Villa competed at the second Junior World Championships alongside Manuel Berettera and Tommaso Brugnami. On the first day of competition he helped Italy win the bronze medal behind Japan and China. During the all-around final Villa won bronze, 0.001 points ahead of Tomoharu Tsunogai and behind Qin Guohuan of China and Ángel Barajas of Colombia. Additionally Villa won bronze on rings and placed fifth on horizontal bar.

=== Senior: 2025–present ===
Villa made his senior international debut at the 2025 Koper World Challenge Cup where he placed fifth on rings and fourth on horizontal bar. He next competed at the 2025 World University Games alongside Lorenzo Bonicelli and Niccoló Vannucchi. They withdrew from the competition after Bonicelli suffered a serious neck injury when dismounting the rings.

Villa competed at the 2026 Koper World Challenge Cup where he won gold on horizontal bar.

== Competitive history ==
Year	Event	Team	AA	FX	PH	SR	VT	PB	HB
Junior
2019	International Junior Team Cup		3rd place, bronze medalist(s)		2nd place, silver medalist(s)	6	3rd place, bronze medalist(s)	2nd place, silver medalist(s)	2nd place, silver medalist(s)
2020	Mallorca Cup		5						
2021	Italian Championships		18						
2022	DTB Pokal Team Challenge	3rd place, bronze medalist(s)			1st place, gold medalist(s)	5			2nd place, silver medalist(s)
2022	European Youth Olympic Festival	1st place, gold medalist(s)	2nd place, silver medalist(s)		4	5	8		4
2022	EYOF Mixed Pairs	1st place, gold medalist(s)							
2022	European Championships	1st place, gold medalist(s)	6		1st place, gold medalist(s)	7			
2022	Italian Championships				8	6			5
2023	Luxembourg Open	1st place, gold medalist(s)	1st place, gold medalist(s)		3rd place, bronze medalist(s)	1st place, gold medalist(s)			1st place, gold medalist(s)
2023	Junior World Championships	3rd place, bronze medalist(s)	3rd place, bronze medalist(s)			3rd place, bronze medalist(s)			5
Senior
2025	Koper World Challenge Cup					5			4
2025	World University Games	DNF							
2026	DTB Pokal Team Challenge	3rd place, bronze medalist(s)		4					
2026	Koper World Challenge Cup								1st place, gold medalist(s)
2026	Italian Championships		10			7			
2026	European Championships	4	15						
2026	World Championships	9							
