= Soňa Artamonova =

Russian-born Czech artistic gymnast (born 2007)

- Alternative name: Soňa Artamonová
- Born: 9 October 2007 (age 18) Murmansk, Russia

Gymnastics career
- Discipline: Women's artistic gymnastics
- Country represented: Czech Republic; (2021 – present)
- Training location: Brno, Czech Republic
- Club: TJ Sokol Brno
- Head coach: Katerina Janeckova
Medal record
Artistic gymnastics
Representing Czech Republic
FIG World Cup
Event	1st	2nd	3rd
World Challenge Cup	1	0	0

Soňa Artamonova (born 9 October 2007) is a Russian-born Czech artistic gymnast. She competed at the 2023 World Artistic Gymnastics Championships where she qualified as an individual to the 2024 Summer Olympics, representing the Czech Republic. She won a gold medal on the floor exercise at the 2023 Szombathely World Challenge Cup.

== Early life ==
Artamonova was born in 2007 in Murmansk, Russia. She has lived in the Czech Republic since she was seven years old. She started training in ballet when she was five years old. Two years later, her ballet teacher encouraged her to build muscle, so her mother took her to gymnastics classes, and she eventually stopped ballet.

== Junior career ==
Artamonova finished 12th in the junior division at the 2021 Czech Championships. Later that year, she made her international debut at the Hanspeter Demetz Memorial in Innsbruck, Austria. She won the all-around silver medal. Then at the 2021 Olympic Hopes Cup in Liberec, she helped the Czech Republic B team win the bronze medal. She individually placed fifth in the all-around and sixth in the uneven bars event final.

At the 2022 Czech Championships, Artamonova won the silver medal in the all-around. Then in the event finals, she won silver on balance beam and floor exercise and bronze on uneven bars, and she placed fourth on the vault. She then won the junior all-around gold medal at the 2022 Austrian Team Challenge and helped the Czech team place second. At the European Youth Olympic Festival, she helped the Czech team place seventh. Individually, she placed 17th in the all-around and seventh in the balance beam final. Then at the European Championships, she contributed toward the Czech team's sixth-place finish, and she placed 18th in the individual all-around. The final event of her junior career was the 2022 Vera Caslavska Grand Prix where she won the all-around silver medal and the team gold medal.

== Senior career ==
Artamonova became age-eligible for senior competitions in 2023. She competed at the European Championships where the Czech team placed 13th. Then at her first senior Czech Championships, she won the bronze medal in the all-around. Then in the event finals, she won the titles on the balance beam and floor exercise and the bronze medal on the vault. She won the all-around bronze medal at the Linz Friendly and helped the Czech team place second behind Austria.

Artamonova made her FIG World Cup debut at the Szombathely World Challenge Cup and won the gold medal on the floor exercise. Then at the World Championships, she helped the Czech team place 21st. Individually, she finished 47th in the all-around with a total score of 50.032. This result earned an individual berth as the 12th highest-placing eligible gymnast. Her final event of the year was the Sokol Grand Prix where she won the mixed-pairs event with partner Ondrej Kalny. At the 2024 Summer Olympics, she finished 46th in the all-around, placing 61st on uneven bars, 38th on balance beam, and 62nd on floor exercise.

== Competitive history ==
Year	Event	Team	AA	VT	UB	BB	FX
Junior
2021	Czech Championships		12				
2021	Hanspeter Demetz Memorial		2nd place, silver medalist(s)				
2021	Olympic Hopes Cup	3rd place, bronze medalist(s)	5		6		
2022	Czech Championships		2nd place, silver medalist(s)				
2022	Austrian Team Challenge	2nd place, silver medalist(s)	1st place, gold medalist(s)				
2022	European Youth Olympic Festival	7	17			7	
2022	European Championships	6	18				
2022	Vera Caslavska Grand Prix	1st place, gold medalist(s)	2nd place, silver medalist(s)				
Senior
2023
2023	European Championships	13					
2023	Czech Championships		3rd place, bronze medalist(s)	3rd place, bronze medalist(s)		1st place, gold medalist(s)	1st place, gold medalist(s)
2023	Linz Friendly	2nd place, silver medalist(s)	3rd place, bronze medalist(s)				
2023	Szombathely World Challenge Cup						1st place, gold medalist(s)
2023	World Championships		47				
2023	Sokol Grand Prix	1st place, gold medalist(s)					
2024
2024	Olympic Games		46				
2025
2025	World Championships	—N/a	23			R3	
2026
2026	European Championships	15	20				
