= 2024 African Artistic Gymnastics Championships =

Artistic Gymnastics Championship

African Artistic Gymnastics Championships
- Venue: Salle M'hamid de Gymnastique Artistique
- Location: Marrakesh, Morocco
- Date: May 3–6, 2024

The 2024 African Artistic Gymnastics Championships was the 18th iteration of the event and took place on May 3–6 in Marrakesh, Morocco. Both senior and junior titles were contested.

The competition served as qualification for the 2024 Olympic Games.

== Medal winners ==
=== Senior ===
Event	Gold	Silver	Bronze
Men
Team	Egypt; Abdelrahman Abdelhaleem; Mohamed Afify; Omar Mohamed; Mustafa Ahmed; Ali Zahran	Morocco; Abdelaziz Essamyry; Achraf Quistas; Hamza Hossaini; Taha Kabouri; Zakariae Setti	Cameroon; Fidele Bello Mamoudou; David Manguele; Ledoux Ngorbo; Ruben Sodea
All-around	(Egypt) Omar Mohamed	(Egypt) Mohamed Afify	(South Africa) Luke James
Floor Exercise	(South Africa) Luke James	(Egypt) Omar Mohamed	(Morocco) Hamza Hossaini
Pommel Horse	(Egypt) Abdelrahman Abdelhaleem	(Egypt) Mohamed Afify	(Morocco) Taha Kabouri
Rings	(Egypt) Ali Zahran	(Egypt) Omar Mohamed	(Morocco) Hamza Hossaini
Vault	(South Africa) Luke James	(Egypt) Omar Mohamed	(Morocco) Hamza Hossaini
Parallel Bars	(Egypt) Mohamed Afify	(Egypt) Omar Mohamed	(Morocco) Hamza Hossaini
Horizontal Bar	(Egypt) Abdelrahman Abdelhaleem	(Egypt) Omar Mohamed	(South Africa) Luke James
Women
Team	Egypt; Judy Abdalla; Sirine Abouelhoda; Shams Ali; Sandra Elsadek; Jana Mahmoud	South Africa; Caleigh Anders; Naveen Daries; Zelmé Daries; Shante Koti; Karma Visagie	Morocco; Salina Bousmayo; Chorouk Elannabi; Nisrine Hassanaine; Ines Laabourri; Rihab Sobti
All-around	(Egypt) Jana Mahmoud	(Egypt) Judy Abdalla	(Morocco) Salina Bousmayo
Vault	(South Africa) Caleigh Anders	(Egypt) Judy Abdalla	(Egypt) Sandra Elsadek
Uneven Bars	(Egypt) Judy Abdalla	(Egypt) Shams Ali	(South Africa) Zelmé Daries
Balance Beam	(Morocco) Salina Bousmayo	(South Africa) Naveen Daries	(Egypt) Sandra Elsadek
Floor Exercise	(Egypt) Jana Mahmoud	(Egypt) Judy Abdalla	(Morocco) Salina Bousmayo

=== Junior ===
Event	Gold	Silver	Bronze
Boys
Team	Egypt; Mazen Aly; Mazen Baraka; Ziad Bekhit; Ahmed Hassan; Yahia Zakaria	South Africa; Cody Alexander; Kadin Chester; Keagan Klopper; Sibusiso Zulu	Morocco; Abdelkabir Elhiba; Abdelmalek Belhaj; Amine Es Salehy; Soufiane Laqhel; Zakaria Yaqouti
All-around	(Egypt) Yahia Zakaria	(Egypt) Ahmed Hassan	(South Africa) Kadin Chester
Floor Exercise	(South Africa) Kadin Chester	(Egypt) Ziad Bekhit	(Tunisia) Taha Akermi
Pommel Horse	(Egypt) Ahmed Hassan	(Egypt) Ziad Bekhit	(South Africa) Kadin Chester
Rings	(Egypt) Ziad Bekhit	(Egypt) Mazen Baraka	(South Africa) Kadin Chester
Vault	(South Africa) Sibusiso Zulu	(Egypt) Mazen Aly	(Egypt) Yahia Zakaria
Parallel Bars	(Egypt) Yahia Zakaria	(Egypt) Ziad Bekhit	(South Africa) Sibusiso Zulu
Horizontal Bar	(Egypt) Mazen Aly	(Egypt) Yahia Zakaria	(South Africa) Keegan Klopper
Girls
Team	Egypt; Jana Ahmed; Mayane Elbanna; Goudy Khalifa; Dana Khalil; Youmna Mohamed	South Africa; Syan du Preez; Lily Hayes; Jessica Rautenbach; Keira Sawry; Karmia van Jaarsveldt	Morocco; Houda Kabil; Lina Idzim; Marwa Ballil; Niama Faiz; Sara Hadouz
All-around	(Egypt) Dana Khalil	(Egypt) Goudy Khalifa	(South Africa) Syan du Preez
Vault	(Egypt) Dana Khalil	(South Africa) Syan du Preez	(South Africa) Lily Hayes
Uneven Bars	(Egypt) Goudy Khalifa	(South Africa) Syan du Preez	(Egypt) Dana Khalil
Balance Beam	(Egypt) Goudy Khalifa	(Egypt) Dana Khalil	(South Africa) Syan du Preez
Floor Exercise	(South Africa) Syan du Preez	(Egypt) Dana Khalil	(Egypt) Youmna Mohamed

== Medal table ==
=== Combined ===
Rank	Nation	Gold	Silver	Bronze	Total
1	Egypt (EGY)	21	21	5	47
2	South Africa (RSA)	6	6	11	23
3	Morocco (MAR)	1	1	10	12
4	Cameroon (CMR)	0	0	1	1
4	Tunisia (TUN)	0	0	1	1
Totals (5 entries)		28	28	28	84

=== Men ===
Rank	Nation	Gold	Silver	Bronze	Total
1	Egypt (EGY)	12	14	1	27
2	South Africa (RSA)	4	1	7	12
3	Morocco (MAR)	0	1	6	7
4	Cameroon (CMR)	0	0	1	1
4	Tunisia (TUN)	0	0	1	1
Totals (5 entries)		16	16	16	48

=== Women ===
Rank	Nation	Gold	Silver	Bronze	Total
1	Egypt (EGY)	9	7	4	20
2	South Africa (RSA)	2	5	4	11
3	Morocco (MAR)	1	0	4	5
Totals (3 entries)		12	12	12	36

== Olympic berths ==
The top eligible male and female gymnasts earned an Olympic berth to the 2024 Olympic Games. Omar Mohamed and Jana Mahmoud, both from Egypt, claimed these spots.

== Participating nations ==
- Cameroon
- Chad
- Egypt
- Morocco
- Namibia
- South Africa
- Tunisia
- Mauritius

Algeria did not send any athletes due to the Ministry of Youth and Sports not receiving approval to participate. This was due to the ongoing conflict of RS Berkane football club wearing jerseys that displayed the Moroccan map along with its disputed Southern Provinces.

This was the first time Chad's women's national gymnastics team competed at an international event.
