= Radomyr Stelmakh =

Ukrainian and German artistic gymnast

- Радомир Стельмах
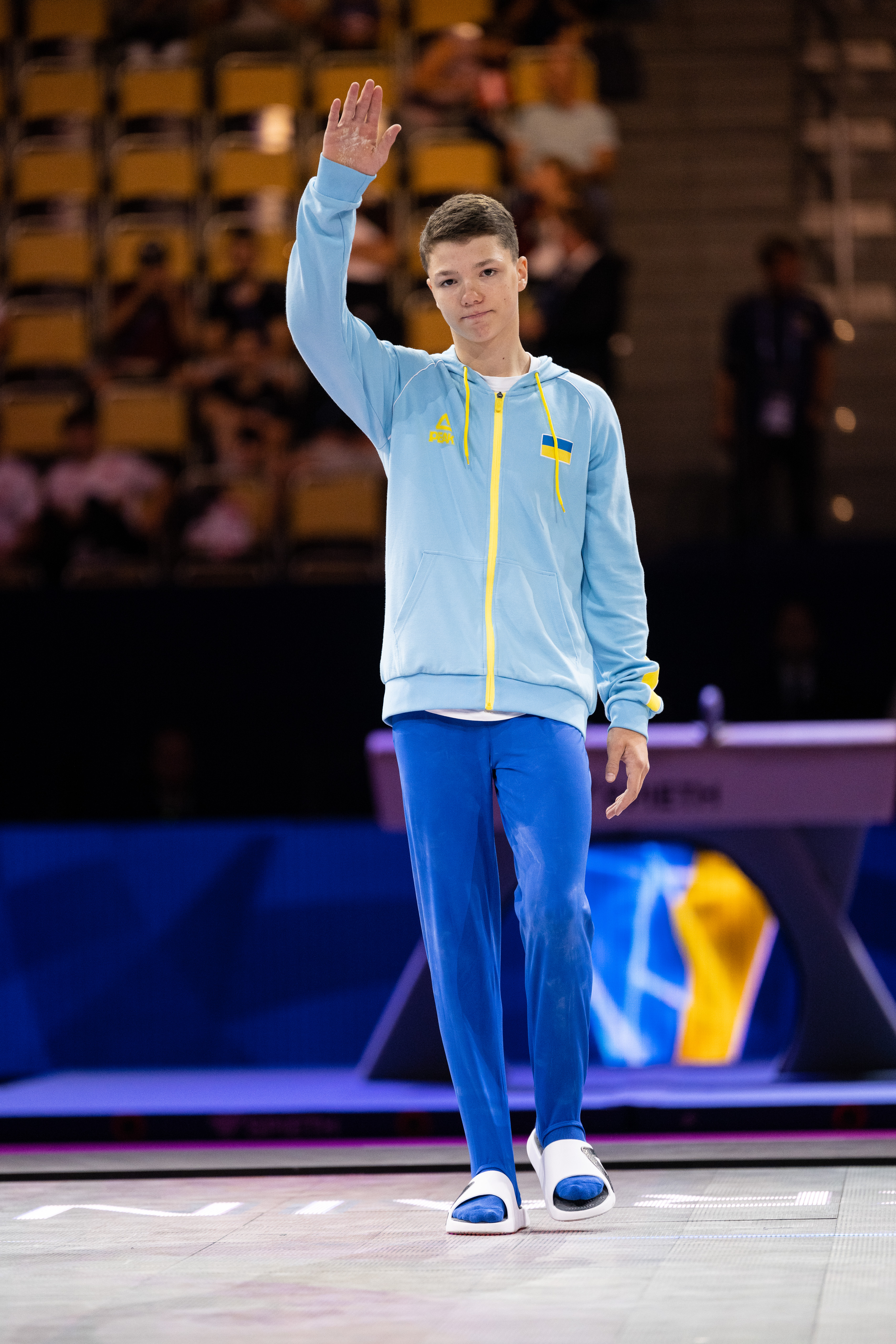
- Stelmakh at the 2022 Junior European Championships

Personal information
- Full name: Radomyr Ruslanovych Stelmakh
- Nickname: Radiik
- Born: 18 August 2005 (age 21) Zaporizhzhia, Ukraine

Gymnastics career
- Discipline: Men's artistic gymnastics
- Country represented: Germany; (2026–present)
- Former countries represented: Ukraine (2018–2024)
- Training location: Cottbus, Germany
- Club: SC Cottbus
- Head coach: Alexander Suprun
- Former coach: Eduard V. Yermakov
Medal record
Representing Ukraine
Men's artistic gymnastics
European Championships
Gold medal – first place	2024 Rimini	Team
FIG World Cup
Event / 1st / 2nd / 3rd; World Challenge Cup / 0 / 1 / 2

Radomyr Ruslanovych Stelmakh (Ukrainian: Радомир Русланович Стельмах; born 18 August 2005) is a Ukrainian and German artistic gymnast currently representing Germany in international competition. He previously represented Ukraine until 2026. He was part of the gold medal-winning team at the 2024 European Championships. He represented Ukraine at the 2024 Summer Olympics.

== Gymnastics career ==
Stelmakh took up gymnastics at six years old. He is a pupil of Zaporizhzhia Children's and Youth Sports School No. 1.

=== 2020–2022 ===
Stelmakh competed at the 2020 European Championships held in Mersin, Turkey. While there, he helped the Ukrainian junior team win gold. Individually, he also made the pommel horse final, where he took sixth place.

Stelmakh competed at the 2022 Euro Youth Olympic Festival, where he won the individual all-around. Additionally, he won the bronze in the mixed pair event together with Anna Lashchevska. He also won silver on floor exercise and pommel horse and bronze on parallel bars.

=== 2024 ===
Stelmakh competed at the 2024 European Championships alongside Nazar Chepurnyi, Illia Kovtun, Igor Radivilov, and Oleg Verniaiev where he helped the Ukrainian Team to Team gold. For his contribution, he was later awarded the title Merited Master of Sports of Ukraine. This same team competed at the 2024 Olympic Games where they placed fifth as a team.

=== 2026 ===
In March 2026, Stelmakh officially switched nationalities to represent Germany; however, Ukraine did not approve the request, so he could not compete at World Gymnastics sanctioned events until 2027. However, in July the German Gymnastics Federation announced that the Ukrainian Gymnastics Federation had released Stelmakh early, allowing him to begin representing Germany immediately.

Stelmakh competed at the German National Championships where he won his first official national title for Germany. He was selected to represent Germany at the 2026 European Championships.

== Competitive history ==
Competitive history of Radomyr Stelmakh representing Ukraine
Year	Event	Team	AA	FX	PH	SR	VT	PB	HB
2017	Daniel d'Amato Intl tournament	2nd place, silver medalist(s)	5						
2019	Daniel d'Amato Intl tournament	4	6		1st place, gold medalist(s)				
2019	Ukrainian Junior Championships		2nd place, silver medalist(s)						
2020	Kyiv Championships		1st place, gold medalist(s)						
2020	Ukraine International Cup				1st place, gold medalist(s)				
2020	Ukrainian Junior Championships		1st place, gold medalist(s)						
2020	AGF Junior Trophy	1st place, gold medalist(s)	2nd place, silver medalist(s)		1st place, gold medalist(s)	4	6	8	7
2020	Junior European Championships	1st place, gold medalist(s)			6				
2021	Ukraine International Cup	1st place, gold medalist(s)	1st place, gold medalist(s)	1st place, gold medalist(s)	3rd place, bronze medalist(s)	7	2nd place, silver medalist(s)	1st place, gold medalist(s)	2nd place, silver medalist(s)
2021	Ukrainian Youth Championships	2nd place, silver medalist(s)	1st place, gold medalist(s)						
2021	Kyiv Championship		1st place, gold medalist(s)						
2021	2021 Wohnen Juniors Trophy		3rd place, bronze medalist(s)	6	2nd place, silver medalist(s)	6		1st place, gold medalist(s)	6
2021	Olympic Hopes	2nd place, silver medalist(s)	1st place, gold medalist(s)						
2021	Sport School Championships	3rd place, bronze medalist(s)	2nd place, silver medalist(s)					2nd place, silver medalist(s)	1st place, gold medalist(s)
2022	Euro Youth Olympic Festival	6	1st place, gold medalist(s)	2nd place, silver medalist(s)	2nd place, silver medalist(s)			3rd place, bronze medalist(s)	
2022	EYOF Mixed Pairs	3rd place, bronze medalist(s)							
2022	Junior European Championships	7	5	R2	5				
2022	1st German Bundesliga	2nd place, silver medalist(s)							
2023	Ukrainian Championships	2nd place, silver medalist(s)	3rd place, bronze medalist(s)		2nd place, silver medalist(s)			2nd place, silver medalist(s)	3rd place, bronze medalist(s)
2023	European Championships	9							
2023	Osijek Challenge Cup			5	8				
2023	World Championships	12							
2024	Antalya Challenge Cup			3rd place, bronze medalist(s)			3rd place, bronze medalist(s)	2nd place, silver medalist(s)	5
2024	European Championships	1st place, gold medalist(s)							
2024	Koper Challenge Cup								5
2024	Olympic Games	5							

Competitive history of Radomyr Stelmakh representing Germany
Year	Event	Team	AA	FX	PH	SR	VT	PB	HB
2026	German Championships		1st place, gold medalist(s)	5	1st place, gold medalist(s)	6		1st place, gold medalist(s)	6
2026	European Championships	5	8						8
2026	World Championships	15							
