= Andreea Preda =

Romanian artistic gymnast

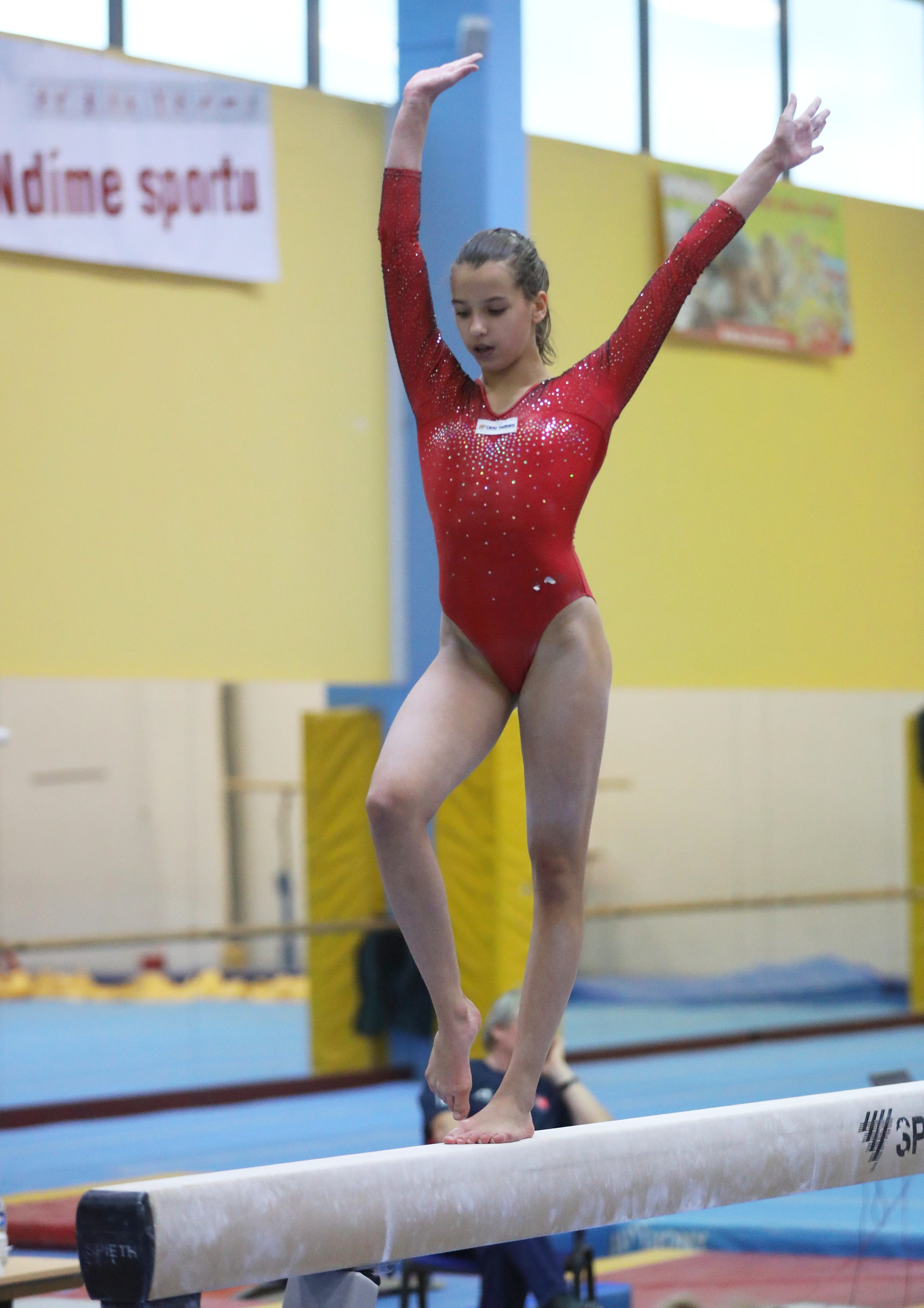
- Preda at the 2019 Olympic Hopes Cup

Personal information
- Born: 23 May 2006 (age 20) Constanța, Romania

Gymnastics career
- Discipline: Women's artistic gymnastics
- Country represented: Romania (2019–2024)
- Club: CSS 1 Constanta
Medal record
Representing Romania
FIG World Cup Series
Event	1st	2nd	3rd
World Challenge Cup	0	1	1

Andreea Preda (born 23 May 2006) is a retired Romanian artistic gymnast. She represented Romania at the 2024 Summer Olympics. She is the 2020 Junior European team champion and balance beam bronze medalist.

== Gymnastics career ==
=== Espoir ===
Preda competed at the 2017 Romanian Junior Championships, placing eighth in the all-around in her age group. In the event finals, she placed seventh on uneven bars and balance beam and eighth on floor exercise. She placed fifth in the all-around at the 2019 Romanian Junior Championships in the espoir division. She then placed 17th in the all-around while competing against seniors at the 2019 Romanian Championships. Then at the 2019 Romanian Individual Championships, Preda finished fourth in the all-around in the espoir division. In the event finals, she won bronze medals on the vault and uneven bars in addition to placing fourth on the balance beam and fifth on the floor exercise.

Preda made her international debut at the 2019 Salamunov Memorial, placing fourth in the all-around and winning the gold medal on the vault. She then competed at the Olympic Hopes Cup, where the Romanian team finished seventh.

=== Junior ===
Preda finished second in the all-around among juniors at the 2020 Romanian Championships behind Ana Bărbosu, and she won a bronze medal in the vault final. At the 2020 Junior European Championships, Preda won a gold medal with the Romanian team. Individually, she won a bronze medal on the balance beam behind Bărbosu and Hungary's Gréta Mayer.

Preda won the silver medal in the all-around at the 2021 Romanian Junior Championships behind Amalia Puflea. She then placed fifth in the all-around while competing against seniors at the 2021 Romanian Championships, and she placed seventh in the uneven bars final. She finished the season competing at the Tournoi International with Amalia Ghigoarță and Sabrina Voinea, and they won the team gold medal. Individually, Preda finished fourth in the all-around and sixth in the balance beam event final.

=== Senior ===
==== 2022 ====
Preda became age-eligible for senior international competitions in 2022. She began the season at the City of Jesolo Trophy, helping the Romanian team place fourth. Then at the Petrom Cup, she won the all-around bronze medal behind Ana Bărbosu and Ioana Stănciulescu. She competed at the Sedan Friendly where the Romanian team lost to France. At the European Championships, Preda and the Romanian team finished ninth in the qualification round, missing out on the team final. At the Romanian Championships, Preda won the all-around bronze medal behind Bărbosu and Amalia Ghigoarță. She won a silver medal on the balance beam and a bronze medal on the floor exercise at the Mersin World Challenge Cup. Despite qualifying a full team, Romania decided to only send two gymnasts to the World Championships– Bărbosu and Preda. Preda finished 58th in the all-around during the qualification round.

==== 2023 ====
Preda competed at the European Championships, helping the Romanian team finish fifth. She placed fourth in the all-around at the Romanian Championships, and she won the silver medal on the uneven bars behind Ana Bărbosu. She competed at the Heidelberg Friendly with the Romanian team that won a silver medal behind Germany. She was selected to compete at the World Championships alongside Bărbosu, Lilia Cosman, Amalia Ghigoarță, and Sabrina Voinea. The team finished in tenth place, earning Romania a team berth for the Olympic Games for the first time since 2012.

==== 2024 ====
Preda was selected to be the alternate for the European Championships team. She competed at the Varna World Challenge Cup, placing sixth on the uneven bars and seventh on the balance beam. At the RomGym Trophy, Preda placed sixth in both the all-around and the balance beam. She was then selected to compete at the 2024 Summer Olympics alongside Ana Bărbosu, Lilia Cosman, Amalia Ghigoarță, and Sabrina Voinea.

== Competitive history ==
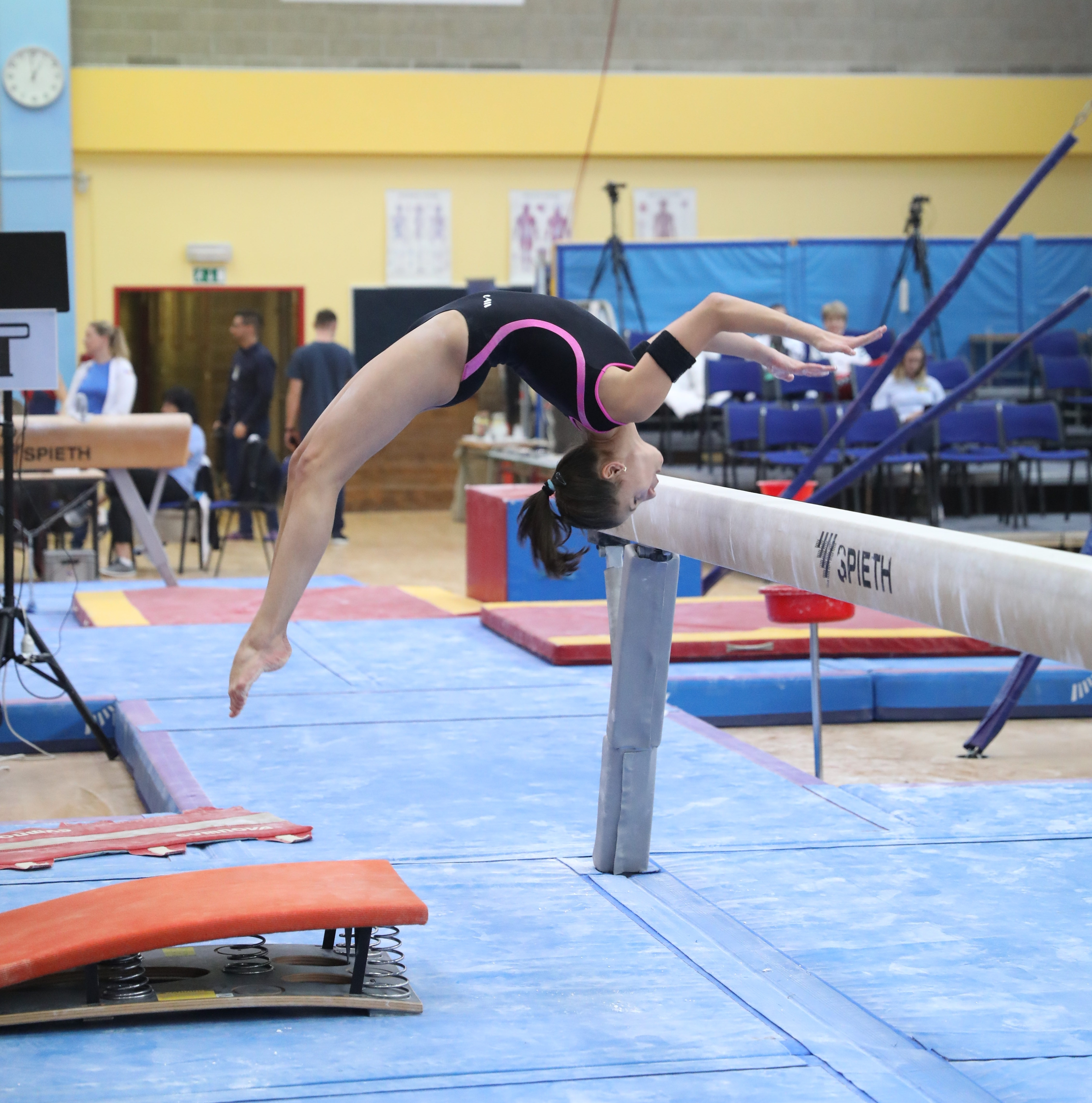
Preda training on the balance beam at the 2019 Olympic Hopes Cup

Competitive history of Andreea Preda at the espoir and junior level
Year	Event	Team	AA	VT	UB	BB	FX
2017	Romanian Junior Championships		8		7	7	8
2019	Romanian Junior Championships		5				
2019	Romanian Championships		17				
2019	Romanian Individual Championships		4	3rd place, bronze medalist(s)	3rd place, bronze medalist(s)	4	5
2019	Salamunov Memorial		4	1st place, gold medalist(s)			
2019	Olympic Hopes Cup	7	33				
2020	Romanian Championships		2nd place, silver medalist(s)	3rd place, bronze medalist(s)	8	7	4
2020	Junior European Championships	1st place, gold medalist(s)				3rd place, bronze medalist(s)	
2021	Romanian Junior Championships		2nd place, silver medalist(s)				
2021	Romanian Championships		5		7		
2021	Tournoi International	1st place, gold medalist(s)	4			6	

Competitive history of Andreea Preda at the senior level
Year	Event	Team	AA	VT	UB	BB	FX
2022	City of Jesolo Trophy	4	24				
2022	Petrom Cup		3rd place, bronze medalist(s)				
2022	Sedan Friendly	2nd place, silver medalist(s)	7				
2022	European Championships	9	19				
2022	World Championships		58				
2023
2023	European Championships	5					
2023	Romanian Championships		4		2nd place, silver medalist(s)	5	
2023	Heidelberg Friendly	2nd place, silver medalist(s)	14				
2023	World Championships	10					
2024	Varna World Challenge Cup				6	7	
2024	RomGym Trophy		6			6	
2024	Olympic Games	7					
