= Sabrina Voinea =

Romanian artistic gymnast

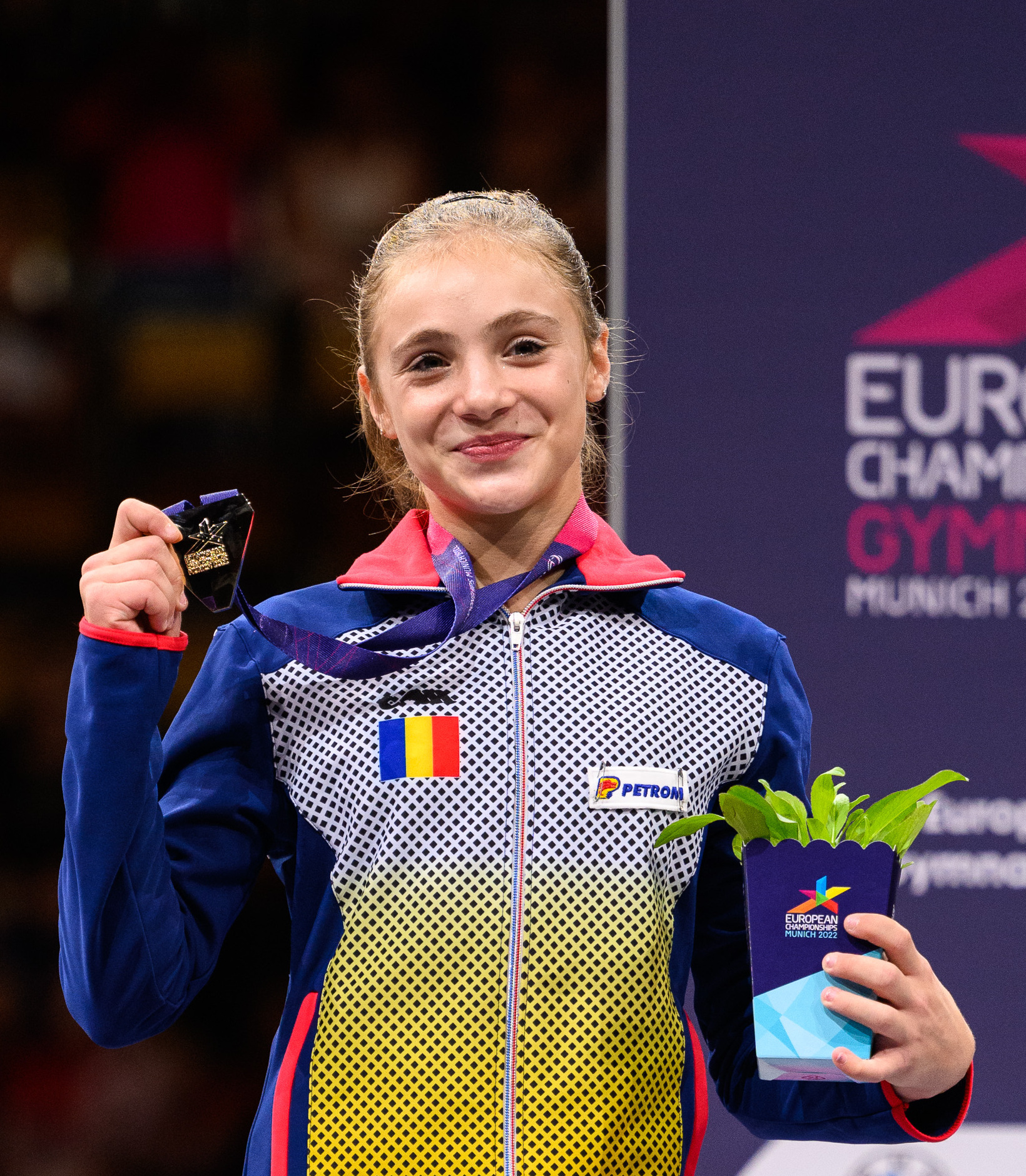
- Voinea at the 2022 Junior European Championships

Personal information
- Full name: Sabrina Maneca-Voinea
- Born: 4 June 2007 (age 19) Constanța, Romania

Gymnastics career
- Discipline: Women's artistic gymnastics
- Country represented: Romania; (2017–present)
- Head coach: Camelia Voinea
Medal record
Women's artistic gymnastics
Representing Romania
European Championships
Silver medal – second place	2024 Rimini	Balance beam
Silver medal – second place	2024 Rimini	Floor exercise
Bronze medal – third place	2023 Antalya	Floor exercise
FIG World Cup
Event	1st	2nd	3rd
Apparatus World Cup	3	0	0
World Challenge Cup	1	0	0
Total	4	0	0

Sabrina Maneca-Voinea (born 4 June 2007) is a Romanian artistic gymnast. She is the 2024 European balance beam and floor exercise silver medalist and the 2023 European floor exercise bronze medalist. She represented Romania at the 2024 Summer Olympics.

== Personal life ==
Voinea was born in Constanța in 2007. Her mother, Camelia Voinea, is a former artistic gymnast who competed at the 1988 Summer Olympics and won a silver medal with the Romanian team. When Sabrina was young, Camelia brought her to the gym where she worked as a coach, and Sabrina became interested in gymnastics herself. Sabrina is coached by her mother.

== Junior career ==
Voinea started competing for the Romanian national team in 2017. In April 2022, she competed at the Junior City of Jesolo Trophy. She helped Romania finish fourth in the team competition. She also won the bronze medal on vault and finished seventh on floor. In July, Voinea competed at the European Youth Summer Olympic Festival. She helped Romania win the gold medal. In the individual events, she finished 12th in the all-around, fourth on vault, and fifth on floor. In August, Voinea competed at the Junior European Championships. She helped Romania win the bronze medal in the team competition. She also finished fourth in the all-around, won the gold medal on vault, and won the bronze medal on floor.

== Senior career ==
=== 2023 ===
Voinea became age-eligible for senior-level competition in 2023. In March she competed at the Doha World Cup where she won gold on balance beam and floor exercise. The following month she competed at the 2023 European Championships. She helped Romania finish fifth in the team competition. She also finished fourth on vault and won the bronze medal on floor exercise.

In October Voinea competed at the 2023 World Championships alongside Ana Bărbosu, Lilia Cosman, Amalia Ghigoarță, and Andreea Preda. During qualifications they finished tenth. Although they did not qualify for the team final, they qualified a team to the 2024 Olympic Games, a feat last achieved in 2012. Individually Voinea qualified to the floor exercise final where she finished fourth.

=== 2024 ===
Voinea competed at the 2024 European Championships where she helped Romania finish fourth. Individually she won silver medals on balance beam and floor exercise, behind Manila Esposito on both.

==== 2024 Olympics ====
At the 2024 Olympic Games Voinea helped Romania finish seventh in the team competition. Individually she qualified to the balance beam and floor exercise event finals. During the balance beam final she fell off the apparatus twice and finished eighth. During the floor exercise final Voinea scored a 13.700 and initially finished in fourth place after losing an execution score tie-breaker with compatriot Ana Bărbosu. However, American Jordan Chiles submitted an inquiry on her score, initially a 13.666, which was accepted and raised her score by a tenth to 13.766. As a result Chiles was initially awarded the bronze medal, with Bărbosu in fourth, and Voinea in fifth.

===== 2024 Olympics controversy =====
During the NBC primetime replay of the event final, it showed that Voinea may not have gone out of bounds despite receiving a neutral deduction of 0.1 for going out of bounds. If the eduction was not taken, Voinea would have scored 13.800, which would have put her in the bronze medal position even after Chiles's score was increased. The Romanian Gymnastics Federation appealed this deduction simultaneously while appealing that Chiles' inquiry was submitted after the 1 minute deadline to the Court of Arbitration for Sport (CAS). Voinea's appeal was rejected as her coach did not submit an inquiry about the neutral deduction during the event final.

Bărbosu's appeal, however, was accepted as the CAS found that Chiles' inquiry was submitted four seconds past the one minute deadline. Therefore the FIG reinstated the original standings, which led to Bărbosu placing third, Voinea placing fourth, and Chiles placing fifth. The International Olympic Committee upheld the findings from the CAS.

=== 2025 ===
In May, Voinea was selected for the European Championships along with teammates Lilia Cosman, Ana Bărbosu, Denisa Golgotă, and Ella Oprea. Voinea competed on the balance beam and the floor, but after poor results on each, she did not compete on vault as she was entered to do. The team finished in 4th place.

In September, Voinea competed at the World Challenge Cup in Paris and won a gold medal on floor exercise.

She was selected for the 2025 World Championships, where she placed fourth in the floor exercise final and seventh in the balance beam final. She was also a reserve for the vault final. She competed with a fever and tendinitis.

== Controversies ==
After the 2025 World Championships, complaints were lodged against Voinea with the Romanian Gymnastics Federation by her teammates Denisa Golgotă and Anamaria Mihăescu for bullying and harassment. Golgotă alleged that other gymnasts said they heard another person, who media reported was Voinea, repeatedly threaten that they wanted to hit her until she was disfigured. Voinea's mother denied the allegations and said she intended to sue Golgotă.

In March 2026, at the restaurant of the Sport Hotel in the "Lia Manoliu" complex, Voinea got into a physical altercation with a member of Romanian weightlifting team after allegedly calling the weightlifter "fat". In June 2026, Voinea's boyfriend, Șerban Cotîrlan, alleged that she physically assaulted him at the same complex. Cotîrlean had his injuries documented at the National Institute of Forensic Medicine and then filed a complaint at a police station.

== Competitive history ==
Competitive history of Sabrina Voinea at the junior level
Year	Event	Team	AA	VT	UB	BB	FX
2021	Romanian Championships		13	2nd place, silver medalist(s)			
2021	Tournoi International	1st place, gold medalist(s)	21	1st place, gold medalist(s)			
2022	City of Jesolo Trophy	4		3rd place, bronze medalist(s)			7
2022	Romanian Junior Championships		2nd place, silver medalist(s)				
2022	European Youth Olympic Festival	1st place, gold medalist(s)	12	4			5
2022	Junior European Championships	2nd place, silver medalist(s)	4	1st place, gold medalist(s)			3rd place, bronze medalist(s)
2022	Turnoi International	3rd place, bronze medalist(s)	3rd place, bronze medalist(s)	1st place, gold medalist(s)		4	2nd place, silver medalist(s)
2022	Romanian Junior Championships	1st place, gold medalist(s)	1st place, gold medalist(s)	5	4	1st place, gold medalist(s)	

Competitive history of Sabrina Voinea at the senior level
Year	Event	Team	AA	VT	UB	BB	FX
2023	Doha World Cup			5		1st place, gold medalist(s)	1st place, gold medalist(s)
2023	ESP-ROU-SWE Friendly	1st place, gold medalist(s)					
2023	European Championships	5		4			3rd place, bronze medalist(s)
2023	RomGym Trophy	1st place, gold medalist(s)	2nd place, silver medalist(s)	4		6	1st place, gold medalist(s)
2023	Romanian Championships	1st place, gold medalist(s)	2nd place, silver medalist(s)			8	1st place, gold medalist(s)
2023	Heidelberg Friendly	2nd place, silver medalist(s)	13				
2023	World Championships	10				R3	4
2024
2024	European Championships	4	4			2nd place, silver medalist(s)	2nd place, silver medalist(s)
2024	Olympic Games	7				8	4
2025	City of Jesolo Trophy	6					
2025	Doha World Cup					5	1st place, gold medalist(s)
2025	European Championships	4					
2025	Paris World Challenge Cup						1st place, gold medalist(s)
2025	World Championships			R1		7	4
2026
2026	European Championships	11					
2026	World Championships	19					
