= Ana Bărbosu =

Romanian artistic gymnast

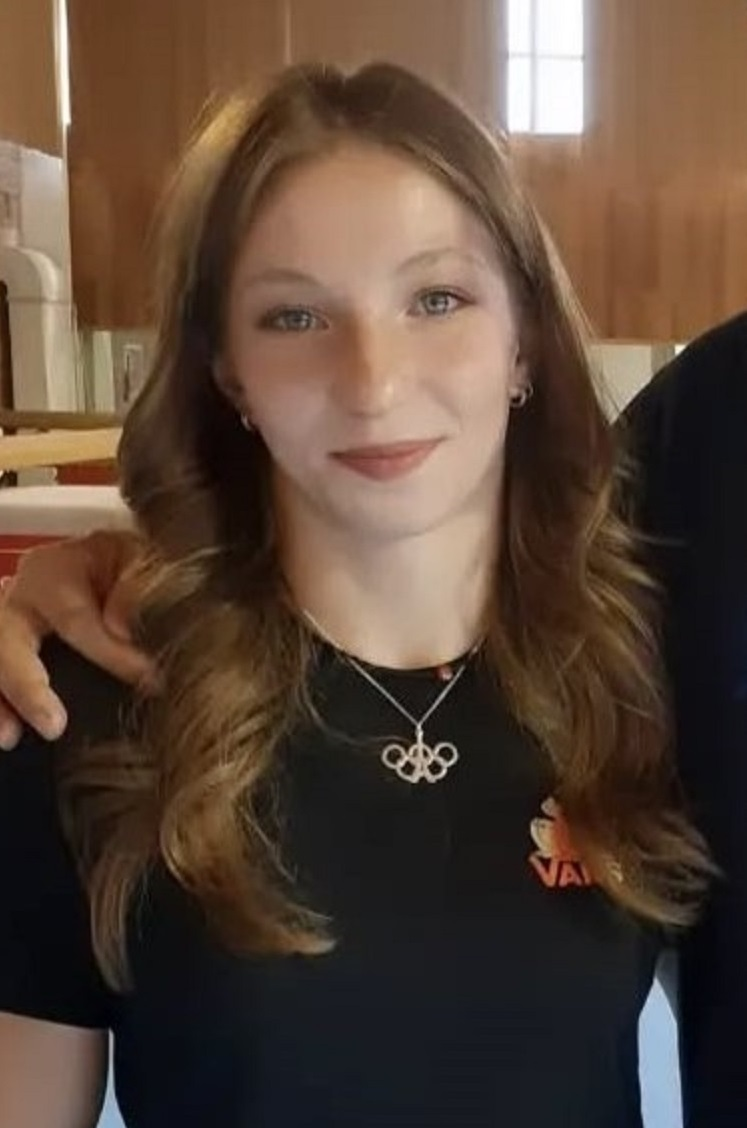
- Bărbosu in 2024

Personal information
- Full name: Ana Maria Bărbosu
- Born: 26 July 2006 (age 20) Focșani, Romania

Gymnastics career
- Discipline: Women's artistic gymnastics
- Country represented: Romania; (2019–present)
- College team: Stanford Cardinal
- Club: CSS Focșani
- Head coaches: Corina Morosan, Florin Cotutiu
- Assistant coach: Ramona Micu
- Former coaches: Daniela Trandafir, Patrick Kiens, Daymon Jones, Lucian Sandu, Gina Gogean
- Choreographer: Patrick Kiens, Daymon Jones
Medal record

Representing Romania
Olympic Games
Bronze medal – third place	2024 Paris	Floor exercise
European Championships
Gold medal – first place	2025 Leipzig	Floor exercise
Silver medal – second place	2025 Leipzig	Balance beam
Bronze medal – third place	2025 Leipzig	All-around
Bronze medal – third place	2025 Leipzig	Uneven bars
FIG World Cup
Event / 1st / 2nd / 3rd; World Challenge Cup / 4 / 0 / 1
Representing the Stanford Cardinal
NCAA Championships
Silver medal – second place	2026 Fort Worth	Balance Beam

Ana Maria Bărbosu (born 26 July 2006) is a Romanian artistic gymnast. She won the bronze medal in the floor exercise at the 2024 Summer Olympics in Paris. She is also the 2025 European floor exercise champion and all-around bronze medalist. She is a six-time European junior champion, having won all junior events at the 2020 European Championships, including the team event. Bărbosu is also a three-time Romanian national all-around champion.

== Early life ==
Bărbosu was born in Focșani in 2006. She took up gymnastics at age four.

In June 2025 Bărbosu took the Baccalaureate exam where she scored the highest out of her entire high school class.

== Junior gymnastics career ==
=== 2017 ===
Bărbosu competed in the Junior II Level 3 division at the 2017 Romanian Junior Championships, finishing fourth in the all-around. In event finals, she was fifth on vault and fourth on uneven bars, before she earned a silver medal on balance beam and a bronze medal on floor.

=== 2019 ===
Bărbosu opened her season at the domestic Petrom Cup in June, winning gold in the all-around ahead of Sabrina Voinea and Maria Ceplinschi. She then won gold in the Espoir division at the 2019 Romanian Junior Championships the following week, again ahead of Voinea and Amalia Petre in third. At the senior Championships in September, Bărbosu won bronze in the all-around and on floor, while also placing sixth on vault and balance beam and seventh on uneven bars. The following month, at the Romanian Individual Championships, she nearly swept the Espoir division, winning titles in the all-around and on every event but vault, where she won silver behind Voinea.

Bărbosu made her junior international debut in November at the Swiss Cup in Wallisellen, where she won gold with the Romanian team and individually in the all-around. She finished in the top two on every event. Bărbosu competed at the Horizon Cup in Thessaloniki, Greece the following week, where she won the Espoir 2006 all-around title after posting the top score on every event but uneven bars. She finished her international season at Top Gym in Charleroi, Belgium at the end of the month, where the combined Romanian/Singaporean team finished fourth. Individually, Bărbosu won the silver medal in the all-around between Russians Vladislava Urazova and Elena Gerasimova. In event finals, she won silver on floor, bronze on beam, and tied for bronze on bars with Lilou Besson of France.

=== 2020 ===
Due to the COVID-19 pandemic, gymnasts had limited international competitive opportunities. At the 2020 Romanian Championships, Bărbosu won the silver medal behind Silviana Sfiringu and ahead of Ioana Stănciulescu to finish as the highest-placing junior in the combined all-around final. In the junior division, she again won all-around gold and also swept the event titles. As a result, Bărbosu was named to the nominative team for the 2020 European Junior Championships alongside Iulia Trestianu, Maria Ceplinschi, Andreea Preda, and Luiza Popa.

At Junior Euros, Bărbosu led the Romanian team to a gold medal finish of more than 10 points ahead of Ukraine and Hungary. Individually, she won the all-around title by over 4 points ahead of teammate Ceplinschi and Daniela Batrona of Ukraine and qualified first into all four of the event finals. She then won gold in all four event finals.

=== 2021 ===
At the Romanian Championships in September, Bărbosu won the gold medal on the uneven bars, and took the silver on floor as well as in the all-around. In November, she competed at the Top Gym Tournament in Belgium, where she won the all-around, and also picked up the gold medals in the uneven bars and balance beam finals.

== Senior gymnastics career ==
=== 2022 ===
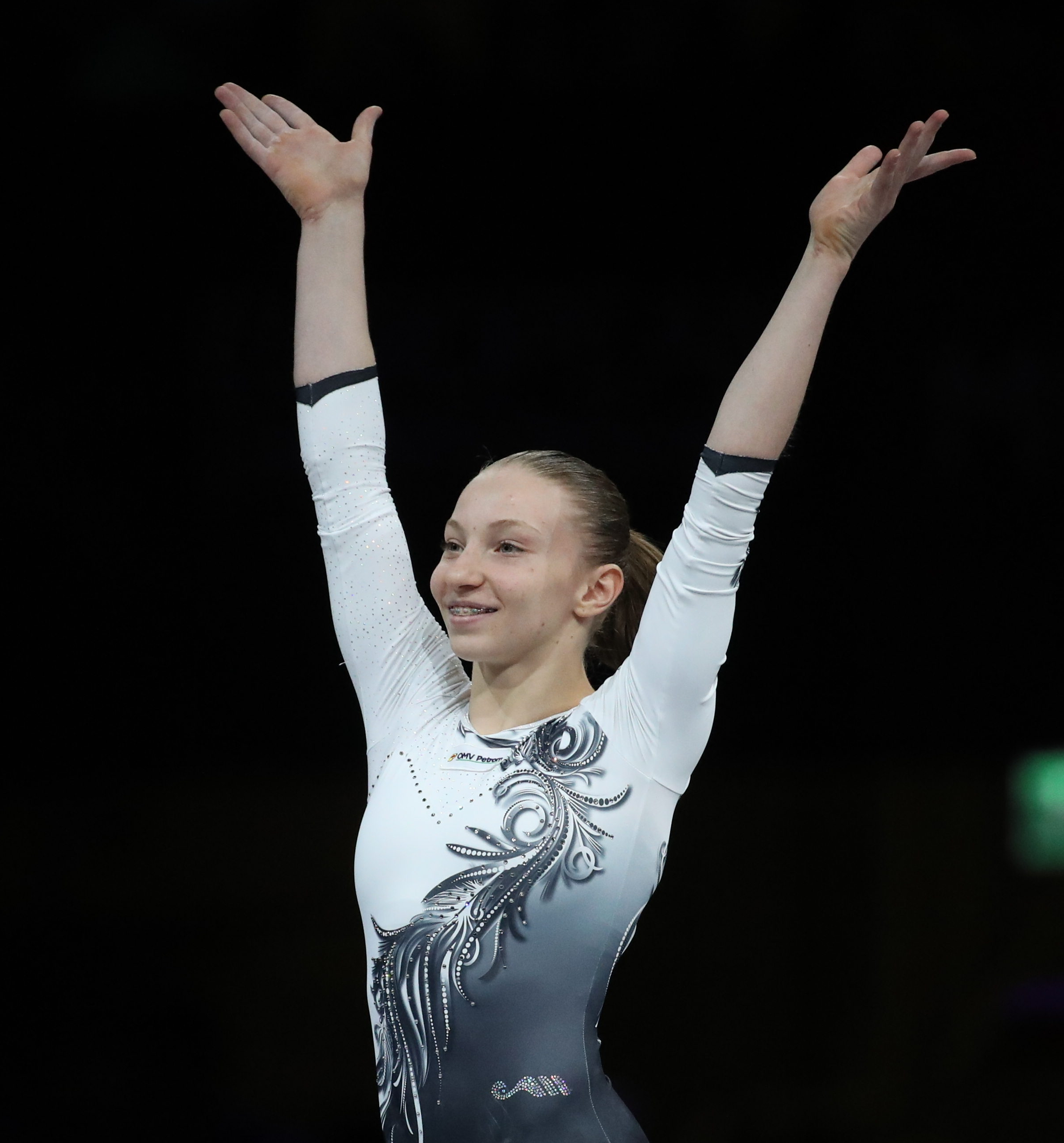
Bărbosu at the 2022 European Championships

Bărbosu became age-eligible for senior competition in 2022, and made her senior debut at the City of Jesolo Trophy, where she finished fourteenth in the all-around and eighth on the uneven bars. She then competed at the Osijek World Challenge Cup, where she won the gold medal on floor exercise, and took the bronze on balance beam behind Pauline Schäfer and Ana Đerek. At the European Championships in Munich, Bărbosu finished seventh in the all-around, fourth on floor, and eighth on the balance beam. She qualified to the beam final in first place. In the floor final she scored a 13.633. Additionally, she helped Romania qualify a full team for the 2022 World Championships in Liverpool. In October Bărbosu competed at the Mersin Challenge Cup where she won gold on uneven bars, balance beam, and floor exercise. At the 2022 World Championships in Liverpool Bărbosu finished 20th in the all around final.

=== 2023 ===
Bărbosu competed at the 2023 European Championships where she helped Romania finish fifth as a team. Individually she finished ninth in the all-around and seventh on floor exercise.

At the RomGym Trophy she placed first with her team, in the all-around and on the uneven bars. She also won a silver medal on balance beam.

Later in the year, Bărbosu won her second Romanian national title in the all-around as well as a gold medal on the uneven bars and a fourth-place finish on the balance beam.

She finished the year at the 2023 World Championships alongside Lilia Cosman, Amalia Ghigoarță, Sabrina Voinea, and Andreea Preda. During qualifications they finished tenth. Although they did not qualify for the team final, they qualified a team to the 2024 Olympic Games, a feat last achieved in 2012. Individually Bărbosu qualified to the all-around final where she finished twenty-third.

=== 2024 ===
In April, Bărbosu competed at the 2024 European Championships where the Romanian team finished fourth. Individually she placed fourth on vault.

In June, she competed at the RomGym Trophy an international competition taking place in Romania. She won a silver medal in the all-around, behind Kaylia Nemour and ahead of Filipa Martins. In the apparatus finals she won the gold medal on vault.

At the 2024 Olympics Games, Bărbosu competed as part of the Romanian team which qualified to the team finals for the first time in twelve years. Individually she qualified to the all-around and floor exercise finals. In the team finals, the Romanian team placed seventh, bettering their qualification standing of eight. In the all-around final she placed seventeenth.

In the floor exercise final, Bărbosu performed fifth of nine, receiving a score of 13.700 which, as the final came to an end, placed her third after winning the execution-score tie-breaker with fellow Romanian Sabrina Voinea. The last performer in the final was American gymnast Jordan Chiles who received a score of 13.666 putting her in fifth place directly behind Bărbosu and Voinea. However, Chiles's coach, Cécile Canqueteau-Landi, filed an inquiry on Chiles's score which resulted in a Chiles' difficulty score being raised a tenth. It was adjusted to 5.9 from 5.8, and the overall score was upgraded to 13.766, moving her from fifth into the bronze medal position, dropping Bărbosu to fourth and Voinea to fifth.

Subsequently, Bărbosu appealed to the Court of Arbitration for Sport (CAS) that Chiles' inquiry was filed twenty-four seconds after the one-minute deadline, and therefore should not have been reviewed in the first place. On August 10, five days after the final, the CAS found that Chiles' inquiry was filed beyond the 1-minute deadline specified in article 8.5 of FIG 2024 Technical Regulations (specifically 1 minute and 4 seconds). The CAS therefore ruled that the "initial score of 13.666 given to Ms Jordan Chiles in the final of the women's floor exercise shall be reinstated" and ordered the International Gymnastics Federation to determine the ranking of the final and "assign the medal(s) in accordance with the above decision." The FIG reinstated Bărbosu to third place and stated that while they have restored the original standings, placing Bărbosu third, Voinea fourth, and Chiles fifth, the decision on medal allocation ultimately lies with the International Olympic Committee, which subsequently decided to reallocate the bronze medal to Bărbosu and ordered Chiles to return her medal.

"I can't help but think about Sabrina and Jordan right now. It's a difficult situation for us, with so many uncertainties and overwhelming emotions. I hope everyone understands that we have not done anything wrong at the Olympics. And that the Olympic spirit is more important than any misunderstanding between authorities. I want to believe that the day will come when all three of us will receive a bronze medal each."

— Ana Bărbosu when receiving her bronze medal

The same day, Bărbosu posted on her Instagram a message to Voinea and Chiles saying that "my thoughts are with you. I know what you are feeling, because I've been through the same. [...] This situation would not have existed if the persons in charge had respected the regulation. We, athletes are not to be blamed, and the hate directed to us is painful."

Later that day USA Gymnastics (USAG) submitted additional video evidence suggesting that the inquiry was made at 47 seconds opposed to the official time of 1 minute and 4 seconds and requested reinstatement of the 13.766 score. The CAS denied USAG's appeal to reopen the case. USAG stated its intent to continue pursuing "every possible avenue and appeal process, including to the Swiss Federal Tribunal". On 16 August, Bărbosu was officially awarded the Olympic bronze medal in her hometown of Focșani.

=== 2025 ===
Bărbosu returned to competition at the 2025 City of Jesolo Trophy where she won silver medals on balance beam and floor exercise behind Manila Esposito and Alba Petisco respectively. She was then selected to compete at the European Championships alongside Voinea, Cosman, Ella Oprea, and Denisa Golgotă. During the qualification round, which also served as the team competition, Bărbosu helped Romania finish fourth as a team and individually she qualified to the all-around, balance beam, and floor exercise finals and was the first reserve for the uneven bars final. During the all-around final Bărbosu won the bronze medal behind Esposito and Petisco despite falling off of the balance beam. This was the first all-around medal won by a Romanian in 12 years, when Larisa Iordache won silver in 2013. On the first day of apparatus finals Bărbosu was subbed into the uneven bars final after Helen Kevric withdrew; she ended up winning the bronze medal behind Nina Derwael and Bettina Lili Czifra. In doing so she became the first Romanian to medal on uneven bars since Steliana Nistor did so in 2008. On the final day of the competition Bărbosu won silver on balance beam behind Derwael and became the European Champion on floor exercise.

Bărbosu was named European Gymnastics Female Gymnast of the Year for 2025.

=== 2026 ===
On 29 January, 2026, the court partially overturned the CAS ruling on the 2024 Olympic floor medal. The court found that new audio-visual evidence could show that the U.S. coach's scoring inquiry was submitted within the required one-minute time limit for athlete Jordan Chiles, and returned the case to CAS for reconsideration.

In February, it was reported that Bărbosu had missed three unannounced doping control tests. On 28 April, the president of the Romanian Gymnastics Federation announced she was suspended for two years due to a doping control whereabouts violation; later that day, it was clarified that she was not yet suspended, only accused of the whereabouts violation. She was provisionally suspended by the International Testing Agency on 5 May, and she requested that the case be taken to CAS. On 4 November, the CAS ruled to uphold her ban, which is set to expire in May 2028, but chose against overturning her existing competitive results.

== NCAA gymnastics career ==
In early 2025 Bărbosu announced her commitment to compete in NCAA gymnastics for the Stanford Cardinal. She moved to the United States in the summer of 2025.

Bărbosu made her NCAA debut on January 10, 2026 in a meet against Denver. She won the all-around title, posting a 39.400 to record the best all-around competition debut by a first-year Stanford athlete since at least 2000. As a result she was named ACC's Newcomer of the Week. At the 2026 ACC Championships, Bărbosu helped Stanford place second as a team. Individually she was the floor exercise champion and placed second on uneven bars. At the 2026 NCAA Championships, Bărbosu finished as co-runner up on the balance beam.

== Competitive history ==
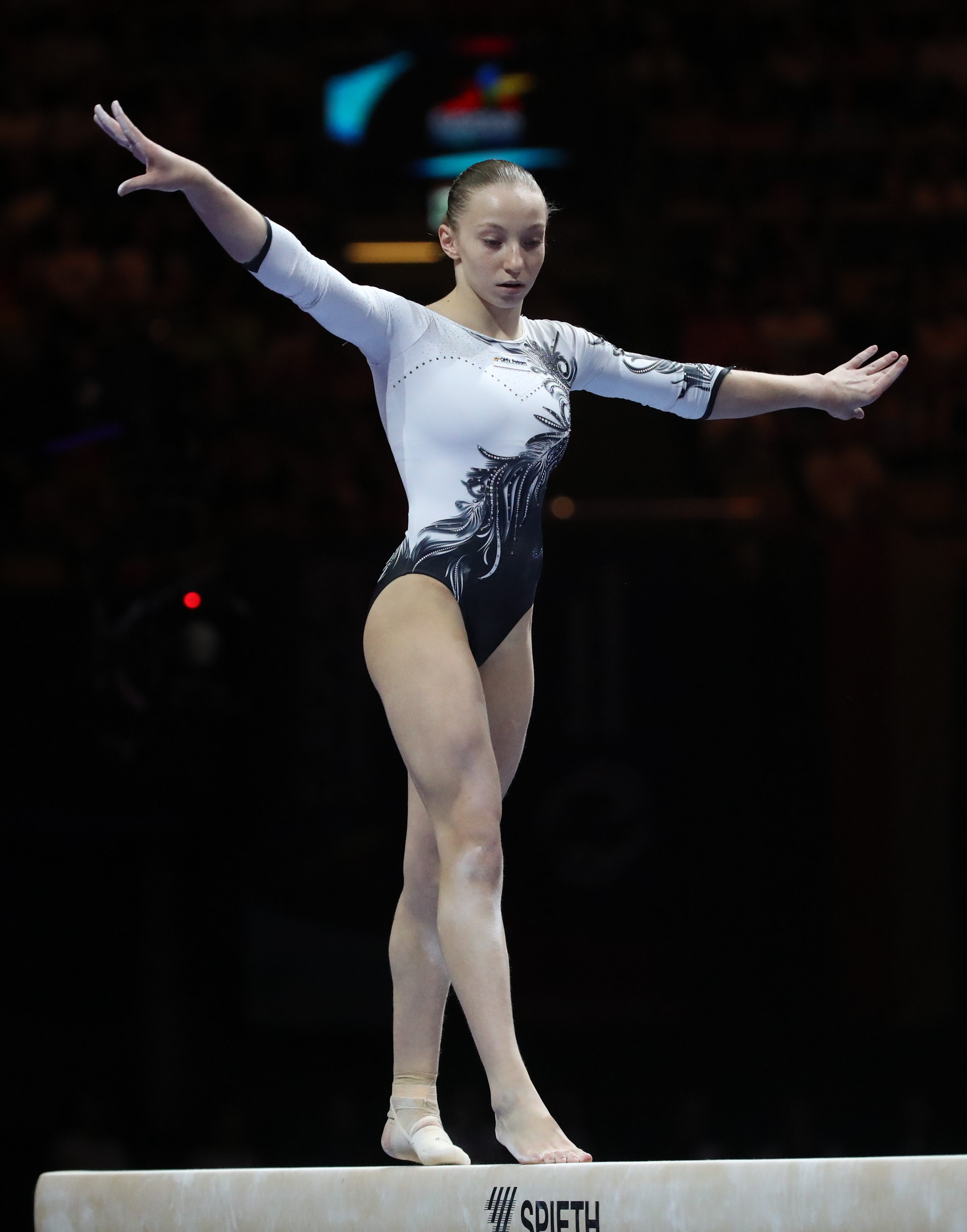
Bărbosu competing in the balance beam final at the 2022 European Championships

Competitive history of Ana Bărbosu at the junior level
Year	Event	Team	AA	VT	UB	BB	FX
2019	Petrom Cup		1st place, gold medalist(s)				
2019	Junior Romanian Championships		1st place, gold medalist(s)				
2019	Romanian Championships		3rd place, bronze medalist(s)	4	7	6	3rd place, bronze medalist(s)
2019	Romanian Individual Championships		1st place, gold medalist(s)	2nd place, silver medalist(s)	1st place, gold medalist(s)	1st place, gold medalist(s)	1st place, gold medalist(s)
2019	Swiss Cup Juniors	1st place, gold medalist(s)	1st place, gold medalist(s)				
2019	Horizon Cup		1st place, gold medalist(s)				
2019	Top Gym	4	2nd place, silver medalist(s)		3rd place, bronze medalist(s)	3rd place, bronze medalist(s)	2nd place, silver medalist(s)
2020	Junior Romanian Championships		1st place, gold medalist(s)	1st place, gold medalist(s)	1st place, gold medalist(s)	1st place, gold medalist(s)	1st place, gold medalist(s)
2020	Romanian Championships		2nd place, silver medalist(s)				
2020	Junior European Championships	1st place, gold medalist(s)	1st place, gold medalist(s)	1st place, gold medalist(s)	1st place, gold medalist(s)	1st place, gold medalist(s)	1st place, gold medalist(s)
2021	Romanian Championships		2nd place, silver medalist(s)	4	1st place, gold medalist(s)	7	2nd place, silver medalist(s)
2021	Top Gym Tournament		1st place, gold medalist(s)		1st place, gold medalist(s)	1st place, gold medalist(s)	

Competitive history of Ana Bărbosu at the senior level
Year	Event	Team	AA	VT	UB	BB	FX
2022	City of Jesolo Trophy	4	14		8		
2022	Osijek Challenge Cup					3rd place, bronze medalist(s)	1st place, gold medalist(s)
2022	European Championships		7		R3	8	4
2022	Romanian Championships		1st place, gold medalist(s)				
2022	Romgym Trophy	1st place, gold medalist(s)	1st place, gold medalist(s)				
2022	Mersin Challenge Cup				1st place, gold medalist(s)	1st place, gold medalist(s)	1st place, gold medalist(s)
2022	World Championships		20				
2023	ESP-ROU-SWE Friendly	1st place, gold medalist(s)					
2023	European Championships	5	9		R3	R1	7
2023	RomGym Trophy	1st place, gold medalist(s)	1st place, gold medalist(s)		1st place, gold medalist(s)	2nd place, silver medalist(s)	
2023	Romanian Championships		1st place, gold medalist(s)		1st place, gold medalist(s)	4	
2023	Heidelberg Friendly	2nd place, silver medalist(s)	1st place, gold medalist(s)				
2023	World Championships	10	23				
2024	Romanian Championships		1st place, gold medalist(s)				
2024	European Championships	4		4			
2024	RomGym Trophy		2nd place, silver medalist(s)	1st place, gold medalist(s)			
2024	Olympic Games	7	17				3rd place, bronze medalist(s)
2025	City of Jesolo Trophy	6	8			2nd place, silver medalist(s)	2nd place, silver medalist(s)
2025	European Championships	4	3rd place, bronze medalist(s)		3rd place, bronze medalist(s)	2nd place, silver medalist(s)	1st place, gold medalist(s)

== Floor music ==
Year	Music Title
2024–25	"Cries in the Wind" - Daniel Pemberton
