= Romanian Gymnastics National Championships =

The Romanian Gymnastics National Championships is the annual artistic gymnastics national competition held in Romania.

== Women's all-around champions ==
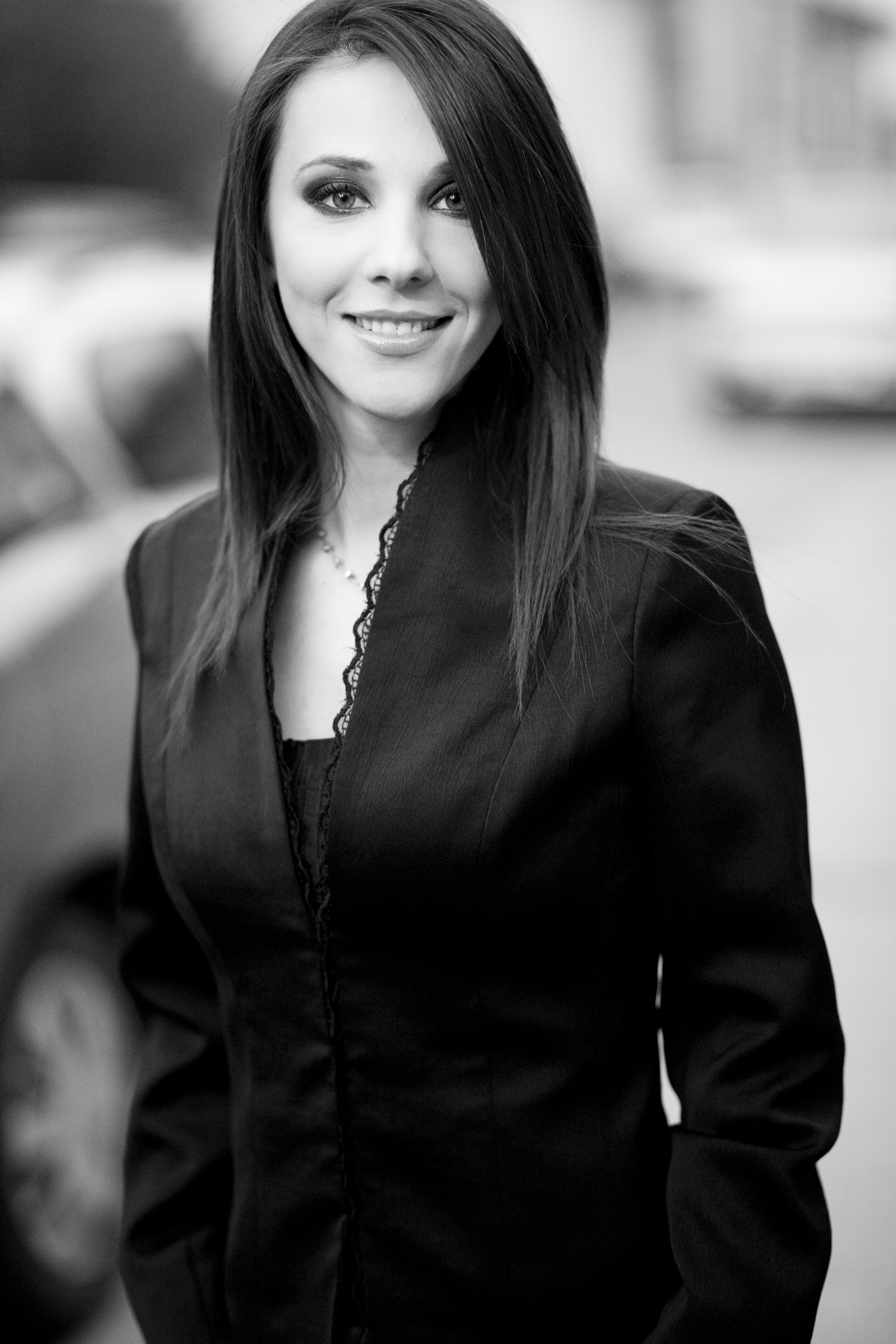
Andreea Răducan

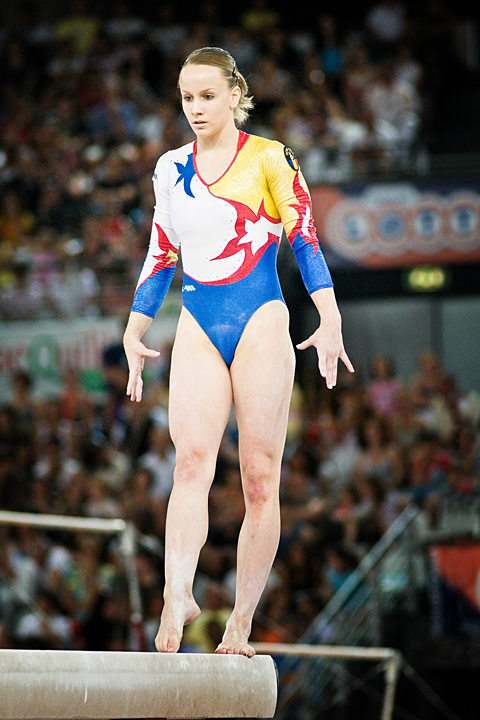
Sandra Izbașa

Year	Champion	Reign Nº	Ref
1970	Elena Ceampelea	1	
1971	Elena Ceampelea	2	
1972	Anca Grigoraș	1	
1975	Nadia Comăneci	1	
1976	Nadia Comăneci	2	
1977	Cristina Itu	1	
1978	Emilia Eberle	1	
1983	Lavinia Agache	1	
1985	Ecaterina Szabo	1	
1986	Daniela Silivaș; Ecaterina Szabo	1 & 2	
1987	Daniela Silivaș	2	
1990	Cristina Bontaș	1	
1991	Lavinia Miloșovici	1	
1992	Lavinia Miloșovici	2	
1993	Lavinia Miloșovici	3	
1995	Lavinia Miloșovici	4	
1997	Simona Amânar	1	
1998	Simona Amânar	2	
1999	Maria Olaru	1	
2000	Simona Amânar; Andreea Răducan	3 & 1	
2001	Sabina Cojocar; Silvia Stroescu	1 & 1	
2003	Aura Andreea Munteanu	1	
2004	Cătălina Ponor	1	
2006	Sandra Izbașa	1	
2007	Steliana Nistor	1	
2008	Steliana Nistor	2	
2009	Ana Porgras	1	
2010	Ana Porgras	2	
2011	Ana Porgras	3	
2013	Larisa Iordache	1	
2014	Larisa Iordache	2	
2015	Larisa Iordache	3	
2016	Larisa Iordache	4	
2017	Larisa Iordache	5	
2018	Silviana Sfiringu	1	
2019	Ioana Stanciulescu	1	
2020	Silviana Sfiringu	2	
2021	Amalia Puflea	1	
2022	Ana Bărbosu	1	
2023	Ana Bărbosu	2	
2024	Amalia Ghigoarță	1	
2025	Denisa Golgota	1	
