= Lilia Cosman =

American artistic gymnast

- Born: August 6, 2007 (age 19) Lansing, Michigan, United States

Gymnastics career
- Discipline: Women's artistic gymnastics
- Country represented: Romania (2022–present)
- College team: Michigan State Spartans (2026); Nebraska Cornhuskers (2027–2029)
- Club: Cetate Deva, CSM Oneşti
- Gym: Capital City Flips Gymnastics
- Head coaches: Liliana Cosma, Kristin Buese

Lilia Cosman (born August 6, 2007) is a Romanian-American artistic gymnast. She joined the Romania women's national artistic gymnastics team in 2022, becoming the national champion on the uneven bars. She represented Romania at the 2024 Summer Olympics. She currently competes in NCAA gymnastics for the Nebraska Cornhuskers, having previously competed a year for the Michigan State Spartans.

== Early life ==
Cosman was born on August 6, 2007 in Lansing, Michigan, as a dual citizen of the United States and Romania. Her parents were both born in Romania and immigrated to the United States in 2001. She began gymnastics at the age of four because her older sister was also a gymnast.

== Gymnastics career ==
=== 2022–23: Junior competitions ===
Cosman moved to Deva, Romania, at age 15, in 2022 and joined the Romanian national team. She began training under coach Liliana Cosma. At the 2022 Romanian Championships, she became the national champion on the uneven bars and also placed fifth in the all-around and on the balance beam. She then competed at the Gymnova Cup held in Keerbergen, Belgium, placing fourth in the all-around and winning a bronze medal in the team competition. Then at the Romanian Junior Individual Championships, she won a bronze medal in the all-around and silver medals on the vault and uneven bars.

=== 2023–present: Senior competitions ===
Cosman became age-eligible for senior international competitions in 2023. She made her senior international debut at the 2023 European Championships and contributed on the vault and uneven bars toward Romania's fifth-place finish. She won the bronze medal in the all-around at the Romanian Championships behind Ana Bărbosu and Sabrina Voinea, and she won a silver medal in the balance beam final. She competed at the Heidelberg Friendly with the Romanian team that won a silver medal behind Germany. She was selected to compete at the 2023 World Championships alongside Bărbosu, Voinea, Amalia Ghigoarță, and Andreea Preda. The team finished in tenth place, earning Romania a team berth for the Olympic Games for the first time since 2012.

Cosman competed at the 2024 European Championships and placed fourth in the balance beam final. She also helped Romania place fourth in the team final, and she finished eighth in the individual all-around. She finished fourth in the all-around at the 2024 RomGym Trophy, and she won a bronze medal on the uneven bars behind Algeria's Kaylia Nemour and Hungary's Zsófia Kovács. Later that year, Cosman was selected to compete at the 2024 Summer Olympics alongside Ana Bărbosu, Amalia Ghigoarță, Andreea Preda, and Sabrina Voinea.

== Collegiate gymnastics career ==
Cosman competed the 2025–2026 season for the Michigan State Spartans, earning a career high 9.900 on the balance beam. In May 2026, she announced that she would transfer to Nebraska to continue her academic and athletic career.

=== Regular season ranking ===
Season	All-around	Vault	Uneven bars	Balance beam	Floor exercise
2026	N/A	N/A	155th	72nd	N/A

== Competitive history ==
Competitive history of Lilia Cosman
Year	Event	Team	AA	VT	UB	BB	FX
2022	Romanian Championships		5	6	1st place, gold medalist(s)	5	
2022	Gymnova Cup	3rd place, bronze medalist(s)	4		6		
2022	Romanian Junior Individual Championships		3rd place, bronze medalist(s)	2nd place, silver medalist(s)	2nd place, silver medalist(s)	5	4
2023
2023	European Championships	5					
2023	Romanian Championships		3rd place, bronze medalist(s)			2nd place, silver medalist(s)	
2023	Heidelberg Friendly	2nd place, silver medalist(s)	19				
2023	World Championships	10					
2024
2024	European Championships	4	8			4	
2024	RomGym Trophy		4		3rd place, bronze medalist(s)		
2024	Olympic Games	7					
2025	City of Jesolo Trophy	6			4		
2025	European Championships	4					

Competitive history of Lilia Cosman at the NCAA level
Year	Event	Team	AA	VT	UB	BB	FX
2026	Big Ten Championships	2nd place, silver medalist(s)				3rd place, bronze medalist(s)	
