= 2022 City of Jesolo Trophy =

Gymnastics competition held in Italy

- Venue: Palainvent Jesolo
- Location: Jesolo, Italy
- Dates: April 9–10, 2022

The 2022 City of Jesolo Trophy was the 13th annual Trofeo di Jesolo gymnastics competition held in Jesolo, Italy. Both senior and junior gymnasts were invited to compete. The previous two iterations of the competition were canceled due to the global COVID-19 pandemic.

== Medal table ==
Rank	Nation	Gold	Silver	Bronze	Total
1	United States	10	7	3	20
2	France	1	0	1	2
2	Germany	1	0	1	2
4	Italy	0	5	3	8
5	Canada	0	0	2	2
5	Romania	0	0	2	2
Totals (6 entries)		12	12	12	36

== Medalists ==
Event	Gold	Silver	Bronze
Senior
Team all-around	United States eMjae Frazier; Shilese Jones; Konnor McClain; Zoe Miller; Elle Mueller	Italy; Angela Andreoli; Alice D'Amato; Asia D'Amato; Martina Maggio; Veronica Mandriota; Giorgia Villa	Canada; Ellie Black; Laurie Denommee; Jenna Lalonde; Cassie Lee; Ava Stewart
Individual all-around	Konnor McClain (USA)	Asia D'Amato (ITA)	Martina Maggio (ITA)
Vault	Coline Devillard (FRA)	Asia D'Amato (ITA)	Ellie Black (CAN)
Uneven bars	Zoe Miller (USA)	Shilese Jones (USA)	Giorgia Villa (ITA)
Balance beam	Konnor McClain (USA)	Martina Maggio (ITA)	Shilese Jones (USA)
Floor exercise	Konnor McClain (USA)	eMjae Frazier (USA)	Ioana Stănciulescu (ROU)
Junior
Team all-around	United States; Madray Johnson; Myli Lew; Zoey Molomo; Ella Murphy; Tiana Sumanasekera; Gabby Van Frayen	Italy; Giulia Antoniotti; Chiara Barzasi; Arianna Belardelli; Alessia Guicciardi; July Marano; Viola Pierazzini	Italy (Sigoa); Matilde Ferrari; Emma Fiorvanti; Caterina Gaddi; Arianna Grillo; Naomi Pazon; Letizia Saronni
Individual all-around	Tiana Sumanasekera (USA)	Madray Johnson (USA)	Myli Lew (USA)
Vault	Tiana Sumanasekera (USA)	Zoey Molomo (USA)	Sabrina Voinea (ROU)
Uneven bars	Helen Kevric (GER)	Madray Johnson (USA)	Myli Lew (USA)
Balance beam	Tiana Sumanasekera (USA)	Madray Johnson (USA)	Amalia Ghigoarță (ROU)
Floor exercise	Tiana Sumanasekera (USA)	Zoey Molomo (USA)	Helen Kevric (GER)

== Results ==
=== Senior ===
==== Team ====
Rank	Team	Vault (gymnastics)	Uneven bars	Balance beam	Floor (gymnastics)	Total
1st place, gold medalist(s)	United States	42.000 (1)	41.899 (1)	40.833 (1)	39.333 (2)	164.065
1st place, gold medalist(s)	eMjae Frazier	13.867		12.933	13.367	164.065
1st place, gold medalist(s)	Shilese Jones	14.033	14.133	13.467	12.100	164.065
1st place, gold medalist(s)	Konnor McClain	14.100	13.733	13.933	13.233	164.065
1st place, gold medalist(s)	Zoe Miller		14.033			164.065
1st place, gold medalist(s)	Elle Mueller	11.867	13.433	13.433	12.733	164.065
2nd place, silver medalist(s)	Italy	41.833 (2)	41.400 (2)	39.367 (2)	39.667 (1)	162.267
2nd place, silver medalist(s)	Angela Andreoli	13.433		10.367	12.300	162.267
2nd place, silver medalist(s)	Alice D'Amato		12.067			162.267
2nd place, silver medalist(s)	Asia D'Amato	14.233	13.767	13.567	13.400	162.267
2nd place, silver medalist(s)	Martina Maggio	13.667	13.533	13.833	13.167	162.267
2nd place, silver medalist(s)	Veronica Mandriota	13.933			13.100	162.267
2nd place, silver medalist(s)	Giorgia Villa		14.100	11.967		162.267
3rd place, bronze medalist(s)	Canada	38.700 (5)	38.800 (4)	37.966 (4)	36.800 (5)	152.266
3rd place, bronze medalist(s)	Ellie Black	12.000	13.033	13.133	11.500	152.266
3rd place, bronze medalist(s)	Laurie Denommée	13.000	12.467		12.433	152.266
3rd place, bronze medalist(s)	Jenna Lalonde	12.567	11.167	11.933	11.900	152.266
3rd place, bronze medalist(s)	Cassie Lee			11.067	12.467	152.266
3rd place, bronze medalist(s)	Ava Stewart	13.133	13.300	12.900		152.266
4	Romania	39.699 (4)	37.567 (5)	37.834 (5)	37.067 (4)	152.167
4	Ana Bărbosu	12.933	13.167	12.667	10.967	152.167
4	Maria Ceplinschi	13.733	11.667	11.900	13.000	152.167
4	Andreea Preda	11.467	11.633	12.267	11.267	152.167
4	Silviana Sfiringu					152.167
4	Ioana Stănciulescu	13.033	12.733	12.900	12.800	152.167
5	Belgium	38.666 (6)	39.333 (3)	36.100 (6)	37.167 (3)	151.266
5	Maellyse Brassart	13.033	13.033	12.167		151.266
5	Margaux Dandois			10.900	12.667	151.266
5	Keziah Langendock	12.533	11.267	10.733	12.367	151.266
5	Noémie Louon	12.833	12.733	13.033	12.133	151.266
5	Lisa Vaelen	12.800	13.567			151.266
5	Zsofi Verleden				11.867	151.266
6	France	40.034 (3)	35.700 (6)	38.533 (3)	36.500 (6)	150.767
6	Coline Devillard	13.900		12.833	12.000	150.767
6	Silane Mielle		12.467	11.933		150.767
6	Morgane Osyssek	13.067	11.300	12.867	12.267	150.767
6	Célia Serber	12.667	11.933	12.833	10.867	150.767
6	Louanne Versaveau	13.067	10.333		12.233	150.767

==== All-Around ====
Rank	Gymnast	Vault (gymnastics)	Uneven bars	Balance beam	Floor (gymnastics)	Total
1st place, gold medalist(s)	Konnor McClain (USA)	14.100	13.733	13.933	13.233	54.999
2nd place, silver medalist(s)	Asia D'Amato (ITA)	14.233	13.767	13.567	13.400	54.967
3rd place, bronze medalist(s)	Martina Maggio (ITA)	13.667	13.544	13.833	13.167	54.200
4	Shilese Jones (USA)	14.033	14.133	13.467	12.100	53.733
5	Veronica Mandriota (ITA)	13.933	12.633	13.467	13.100	53.133
6	eMjae Frazier (USA)	13.867	12.767	12.933	13.367	52.934
7	Zoe Miller (USA)	13.067	14.033	12.133	12.300	51.533
8	Elle Mueller (USA)	11.867	13.433	13.433	12.733	51.466
8	Ioana Stănciulescu (ROU)	13.033	12.733	12.900	12.800	51.466
10	Manila Esposito (ITA)	12.967	13.133	12.967	12.133	51.200
11	Noémie Louon (BEL)	12.833	12.733	13.033	12.133	50.732
12	Maria Ceplinschi (ROU)	13.733	11.667	11.900	13.000	50.300
13	Laurie Denommée (CAN)	13.000	12.467	12.300	12.433	50.200
14	Ana Bărbosu (ROU)	12.933	13.167	12.667	10/967	49.734
15	Ellie Black (CAN)	12.000	13.033	13.133	11.500	49.666
16	Angela Andreoli (ITA)	13.433	13.467	10.367	12.300	49.567
17	Morgane Osyssek (FRA)	13.067	11.300	12.867	12.267	49.501
18	Maellyse Brassart (BEL)	13.033	13.033	12.167	11.133	49.366
19	Louanne Versaveau (FRA)	13.067	10.333	12.967	12.233	48.600
20	Célia Serber (FRA)	12.667	11.933	12.833	10.867	48.300
21	Jenna Lalonde (CAN)	12.567	11.167	11.933	11.900	47.567
22	Desiree Carofiglio (ITA)	11.833	11.700	12.233	11.700	47.466
23	Keziah Langendock (BEL)	12.533	11.267	10.733	12.367	46.900
24	Andreea Preda (ROU)	11.467	11.633	12.267	11.267	46.634
25	Zsofi Verleden (BEL)	11.533	11.433	11.733	11.867	46.566
26	Anna-Lena König (GER)	12.367	11.600	8.667	12.200	44.834

==== Vault ====
Rank	Gymnast	Vault 1	Vault 2	Average
Gold medal	Coline Devillard (FRA)	14.200	13.150	13.675
Silver medal	Asia D'Amato (ITA)	13.650	13.650	13.650
Bronze medal	Ellie Black (CAN)	13.150	13.550	13.350
4	Angela Andreoli (ITA)	13.450	12.650	13.050
5	Laurie Denommée (CAN)	12.950	12.800	12.875

==== Uneven Bars ====
Rank	Gymnast	D Score	E Score	ND	Total
Gold medal	Zoe Miller (USA)	6.5	7.950		14.450
Silver medal	Shilese Jones (USA)	5.9	8.400		14.300
Bronze medal	Giorgia Villa (ITA)	5.8	8.300		14.100
4	Lisa Vaelen (BEL)	5.5	8.350		13.850
5	Ava Stewart (CAN)	5.8	7.900		13.700
6	Asia D'Amato (ITA)	5.8	7.500		13.300
7	Maellyse Brassart (BEL)	5.1	8.050		13.150
8	Ana Bărbosu (ROU)	5.9	6.650		12.550

==== Balance Beam ====
Rank	Gymnast	D Score	E Score	ND	Total
Gold medal	Konnor McClain (USA)	6.1	7.750		13.850
Silver medal	Martina Maggio (ITA)	5.6	8.200		13.800
Bronze medal	Shilese Jones (USA)	5.5	8.050		13.550
4	Ioana Stănciulescu (ROU)	5.4	7.700		13.100
5	Asia D'Amato (ITA)	5.4	7.650		13.050
6	Ellie Black (CAN)	4.9	7.700		12.600
7	Louanne Versaveau (FRA)	4.6	7.200		11.800
8	Noémie Louon (BEL)	3.7	6.400		10.100

==== Floor Exercise ====
Rank	Gymnast	D Score	E Score	ND	Total
Gold medal	Konnor McClain (USA)	5.7	8.200		13.900
Silver medal	eMjae Frazier (USA)	5.8	8.050		13.850
Bronze medal	Ioana Stănciulescu (ROU)	5.4	7.750		13.150
4	Maria Ceplinschi (ROU)	5.2	7.750		12.950
5	Margaux Dandois (BEL)	5.0	7.850		12.850
6	Laurie Denommée (CAN)	5.0	7.600		12.600
7	Cassie Lee (CAN)	5.0	7.550		12.550
8	Veronica Mandriota (ITA)	5.3	7.050	0.3	12.050

== Participants ==
The following federations will be sending teams:

- Belgium
  Senior team: Maellyse Brassart, Margaux Dandois, Keziah Langendock, Noemie Louon, Lisa Vaelen, Jutta Verkest
  Junior team: Chloe Baert, Nell Bogaert, Eva Brunysels, Aberdeen O'Driscoll, Erika Pinxten, Axelle Vanden Berghe
- Canada
  Senior team: Ellie Black, Jenna Lalonde, Cassie Lee, Ava Stewart, Rose Woo
  Junior team: Cristella Brunetti-Burns, Victoriane Charron, Tegan Shaver
- France
  Senior team: Coline Devillard, Silane Mielle, Morgane Osyssek, Célia Serber, Louane Versaveau
  Junior team: Audrey Cozzi, Ambre Frotté, Ming Gheradi Van Eijken, Léna Khenoun, Lilou Viallat
- Germany
- Italy
  Senior team: Angela Andreoli, Asia D'Amato, Manila Esposito, Martina Maggio, Veronica Mandriota, Giorgia Villa
  Junior team: Giulia Antoniotti, Chiara Barzasi, Arianna Belardelli, Alessia Guicciardi, Juli Marano, Viola Pierazzini
- Romania
  Senior team: Ana Bărbosu, Maria Ceplinschi, Bianca Dorobantu, Andreea Preda, Silviana Sfiringu, Ioana Stănciulescu
  Junior team: Amalia Ghigoarță, Ella Opprea, Amalia Puflea, Teodora Stoian, Crina Tudor, Sabrina Voinea
- United States
  Senior team: eMjae Frazier, Shilese Jones, Konnor McClain, Zoe Miller, Elle Mueller, Ashlee Sullivan
  Junior team: Madray Johnson, Myli Lew, Zoey Molomo, Ella Murphy, Tiana Sumanasekera, Gabby Van Frayen
