= 2022 European Women's Artistic Gymnastics Championships =

- Venue: Olympiahalle
- Location: Munich, Germany
- Start date: 11 August 2022
- End date: 14 August 2022
- Competitors: 259 from 37 nations

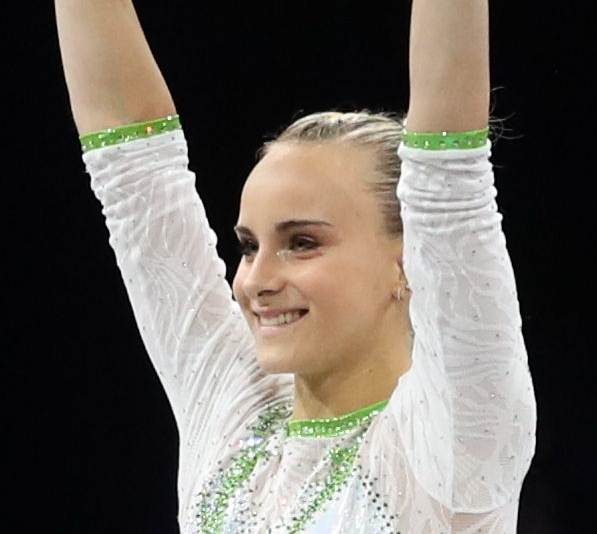
Asia D'Amato won two gold medals and one silver medal at this edition of the European Championships

The 34th European Women's Artistic Gymnastics Championships was held from 11–14 August 2022 in Munich, Germany as part of the second multi-sport European Championships. There were 37 nations who sent athletes. Athletes from Russia and Belarus were banned due to the Russian invasion of Ukraine.

== Schedule ==
Date	Session	Time	Subdivisions
Thursday, 11 August
Thursday, 11 August	Senior All-Around Final and Qualification for Team & Individual Apparatus Finals	10:00 – 12:02	Subdivision 1
Thursday, 11 August	Senior All-Around Final and Qualification for Team & Individual Apparatus Finals	12:24 – 14:26	Subdivision 2
Thursday, 11 August	Senior All-Around Final and Qualification for Team & Individual Apparatus Finals	15:28 – 17:31	Subdivision 3
Thursday, 11 August	Senior All-Around Final and Qualification for Team & Individual Apparatus Finals	17:53 – 19:55	Subdivision 4
Friday, 12 August	Junior Team & All-Around Finals and Qualification for Individual Apparatus Finals	10:00 – 12:00	Subdivision 1
Friday, 12 August	Junior Team & All-Around Finals and Qualification for Individual Apparatus Finals	12:20 – 14:20	Subdivision 2
Friday, 12 August	Junior Team & All-Around Finals and Qualification for Individual Apparatus Finals	15:20 – 17:20	Subdivision 3
Friday, 12 August	Junior Team & All-Around Finals and Qualification for Individual Apparatus Finals	17:50 – 19:50	Subdivision 4
Saturday, 13 August	Senior Team Final	14:00 – 15:40	Top 8 from qualifications
Sunday, 14 August	Junior Individual Apparatus Finals	10:00 – 13:04	Vault, Uneven bars, Balance beam, Floor
Sunday, 14 August	Senior Individual Apparatus Finals	14:30 – 17:31	Vault, Uneven bars, Balance beam, Floor
All times listed in local time (UTC+01:00).

== Medals summary ==
=== Medalists ===
Event	Gold	Silver	Bronze
Senior
Team	Italy; Angela Andreoli; Alice D'Amato; Asia D'Amato; Martina Maggio; Giorgia Villa	(United Kingdom) Great Britain; Ondine Achampong; Georgia-Mae Fenton; Jennifer Gadirova; Jessica Gadirova; Alice Kinsella	Germany; Kim Bui; Emma Malewski; Pauline Schäfer; Elisabeth Seitz; Sarah Voss
All-Around	Asia D'Amato; Italy	Alice Kinsella; Great Britain	Martina Maggio; Italy
Vault	Zsófia Kovács; Hungary	Asia D'Amato; Italy	Aline Friess; France
Uneven bars	Elisabeth Seitz; Germany	Alice D'Amato; Italy	Lorette Charpy; France
Balance beam	Emma Malewski; Germany	Ondine Achampong; Great Britain	Carolann Héduit; France
Floor	Jessica Gadirova; Great Britain	Martina Maggio; Italy	Angela Andreoli; Italy
Junior
Team	Italy; Chiara Barzasi; Arianna Grillo; July Marano; Martina Pieratti; Viola Pierazzini	Romania; Miruna Botez; Amalia Ghigoarță; Amalia Puflea; Crina Tudor; Sabrina Voinea	Germany; Marlene Gotthardt; Meolie Jauch; Helen Kevric; Chiara Moiszi; Silja Stöhr
All-around	Helen Kevric; Germany	Amalia Ghigoarță; Romania	Viola Pierazzini; Italy
Vault	Sabrina Voinea; Romania	Ming van Eijken; France	July Marano; Italy
Uneven bars	Martina Pieratti; Italy	Helen Kevric; Germany	Viola Pierazzini; Italy
Balance beam	Anna Lashchevska; Ukraine	Arianna Grillo; Italy	Amalia Puflea; Romania
Floor	Amalia Puflea; Romania	Viola Pierazzini; Italy	Sabrina Voinea; Romania

=== Medal standings ===
==== Overall ====
* Host nation (Germany)

Rank	Nation	Gold	Silver	Bronze	Total
1	Italy (ITA)	4	5	5	14
2	Germany (GER)*	3	1	2	6
3	Romania (ROU)	2	2	2	6
4	Great Britain (GBR)	1	3	0	4
5	Hungary (HUN)	1	0	0	1
5	Ukraine (UKR)	1	0	0	1
7	France (FRA)	0	1	3	4
Totals (7 entries)		12	12	12	36

==== Senior ====
* Host nation (Germany)

Rank	Nation	Gold	Silver	Bronze	Total
1	Italy (ITA)	2	3	2	7
2	Germany (GER)*	2	0	1	3
3	Great Britain (GBR)	1	3	0	4
4	Hungary (HUN)	1	0	0	1
5	France (FRA)	0	0	3	3
Totals (5 entries)		6	6	6	18

==== Junior ====
* Host nation (Germany)

Rank	Nation	Gold	Silver	Bronze	Total
1	Italy (ITA)	2	2	3	7
2	Romania (ROU)	2	2	2	6
3	Germany (GER)*	1	1	1	3
4	Ukraine (UKR)	1	0	0	1
5	France (FRA)	0	1	0	1
Totals (5 entries)		6	6	6	18

== Senior results ==
=== Team competition ===
Oldest and youngest competitors

	Name	Country	Date of birth	Age
Youngest	Gréta Mayer	Hungary	26 September 2006	15 years, 10 months and 18 days
Oldest	Kim Bui	Germany	20 January 1989	33 years, 6 months and 24 days

Rank	Team	Vault (gymnastics)	Uneven bars	Balance beam	Floor (gymnastics)	Total
1st place, gold medalist(s)	Italy	41.566	42.799	40.166	40.632	165.163
1st place, gold medalist(s)	Alice D'Amato	14.100	14.633		13.333	165.163
1st place, gold medalist(s)	Asia D'Amato	13.833	14.000	13.800	13.566	165.163
1st place, gold medalist(s)	Martina Maggio	13.633		13.066	13.733	165.163
1st place, gold medalist(s)	Giorgia Villa		14.166	13.300		165.163
1st place, gold medalist(s)	Angela Andreoli					165.163
2nd place, silver medalist(s)	Great Britain	41.366	40.133	39.933	39.732	161.164
2nd place, silver medalist(s)	Georgia-Mae Fenton		13.700			161.164
2nd place, silver medalist(s)	Alice Kinsella	13.466	14.000	13.733	13.366	161.164
2nd place, silver medalist(s)	Jessica Gadirova	14.000			13.233	161.164
2nd place, silver medalist(s)	Jennifer Gadirova			12.500	13.133	161.164
2nd place, silver medalist(s)	Ondine Achampong	13.900	12.433	13.700		161.164
3rd place, bronze medalist(s)	Germany	40.932	40.833	39.933	36.732	158.430
3rd place, bronze medalist(s)	Kim Bui	13.266	13.433		13.033	158.430
3rd place, bronze medalist(s)	Elisabeth Seitz	13.333	14.300			158.430
3rd place, bronze medalist(s)	Pauline Schäfer			13.733	12.433	158.430
3rd place, bronze medalist(s)	Sarah Voss	14.333		13.500	11.266	158.430
3rd place, bronze medalist(s)	Emma Malewski		13.100	12.700		158.430
4	Netherlands	40.333	40.666	36.466	38.999	156.464
4	Vera van Pol	13.600		12.100	12.800	156.464
4	Sanna Veerman	13.433	13.400			156.464
4	Tisha Volleman		13.200	11.666	13.166	156.464
4	Naomi Visser	13.300	14.066	12.700	13.033	156.464
4	Shadé van Oorschot					156.464
5	Belgium	40.133	39.832	37.599	37.966	155.530
5	Noemie Louon			12.833		155.530
5	Lisa Vaelen	14.200	14.066	11.833	13.100	155.530
5	Maellyse Brassart	12.933	13.133		12.566	155.530
5	Jutta Verkest	13.000		12.933	12.300	155.530
5	Fien Enghels		12.633			155.530
6	France	40.066	40.332	35.932	38.832	155.162
6	Aline Friess	14.233	13.266			155.162
6	Carolann Héduit	13.800	13.800	11.300	12.966	155.162
6	Marine Boyer			12.866	12.700	155.162
6	Lorette Charpy		13.266			155.162
6	Morgane Osyssek-Reimer	12.033		11.766	13.166	155.162
7	Hungary	41.199	39.265	37.065	36.566	154.095
7	Zsófia Kovács	14.266	13.633	12.033	12.300	154.095
7	Zója Székely		12.666			154.095
7	Gréta Mayer	13.133		12.766	12.433	154.095
7	Csenge Bácskay	13.800				154.095
7	Mirtill Makovits		12.966	12.266	11.833	154.095
8	Spain	39.032	38.499	37.099	37.065	151.695
8	Alba Petisco	13.166	13.133	12.700	12.933	151.695
8	Emma Fernández				11.466	151.695
8	Laura Casabuena	13.000	12.900	11.933	12.666	151.695
8	Lorena Medina	12.866		12.466		151.695
8	Paula Raya		12.466			151.695

=== Individual all-around ===
All gymnasts took part with no qualification. Scores were taken for team final and individual apparatus qualification session. The following is the top 10 of the individual all-around.

Position	Gymnast	Vault (gymnastics)	Uneven bars	Balance beam	Floor (gymnastics)	Total
1st place, gold medalist(s)	Asia D'Amato (ITA)	13.766	13.900	13.500	13.566	54.732
2nd place, silver medalist(s)	Alice Kinsella (GBR)	13.600	13.966	13.033	13.533	54.132
3rd place, bronze medalist(s)	Martina Maggio (ITA)	13.666	13.066	13.400	13.833	53.965
4	Carolann Héduit (FRA)	13.800	13.733	13.400	12.766	53.699
5	Lisa Vaelen (BEL)	14.200	13.500	12.933	13.066	53.699
6	Naomi Visser (NED)	13.133	14.266	12.233	13.633	53.265
7	Ana Bărbosu (ROU)	12.733	13.500	13.533	13.266	53.032
8	Kim Bui (GER)	13.100	14.200	12.833	12.866	52.999
9	Zsófia Kovács (HUN)	14.066	13.366	11.900	13.433	52.765
10	Jessica Gadirova (GBR)	13.866	12.833	12.233	13.766	52.698

=== Vault ===
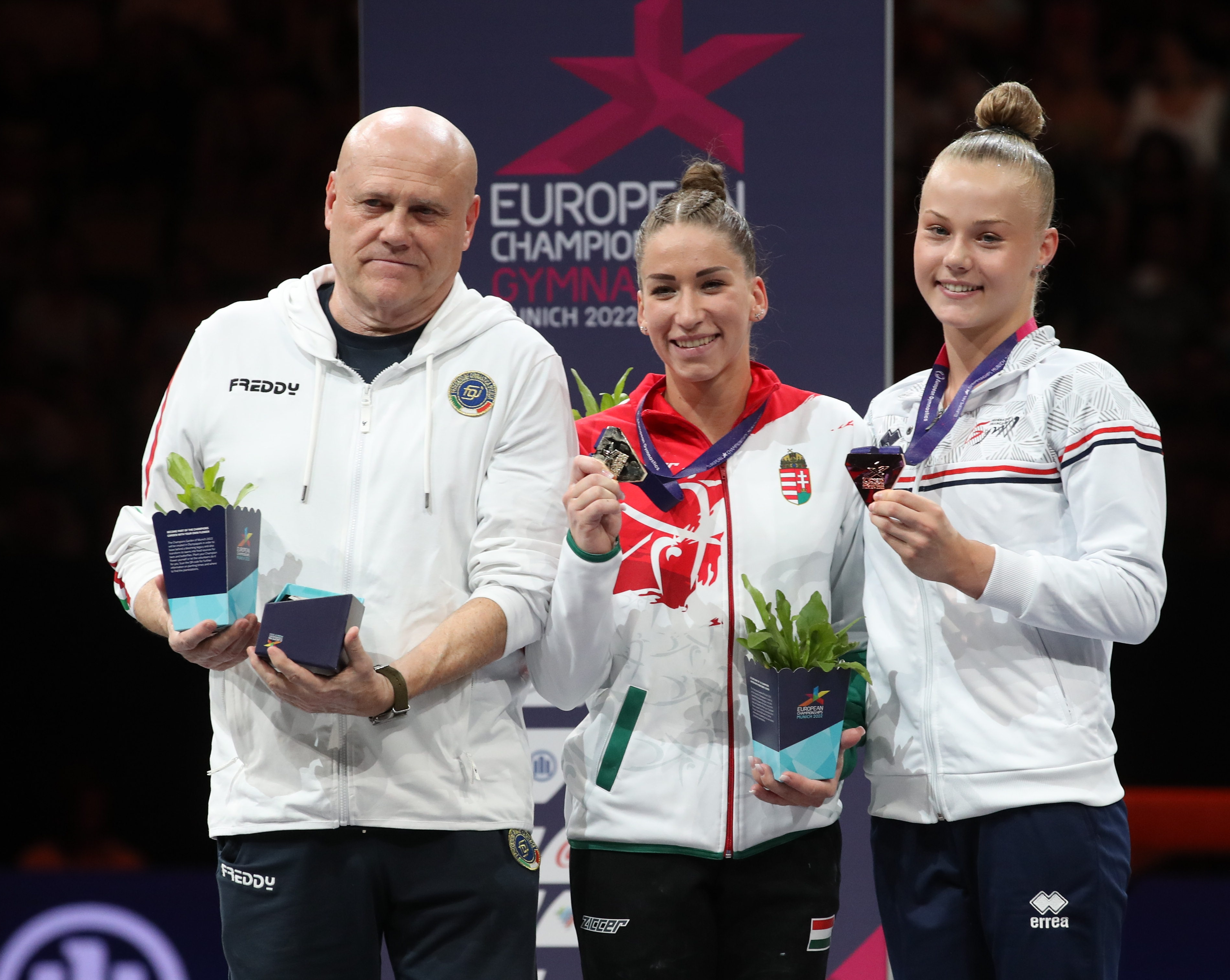
🥇 Zsófia Kovács 🥈 Asia D'Amato (coach Enrico Casella pictured) 🥉 Aline Friess

Oldest and youngest competitors

	Name	Country	Date of birth	Age
Youngest	Valentina Georgieva	Bulgaria	July 28, 2006	16 years and 17 days
Oldest	Zsófia Kovács	Hungary	April 6, 2000	22 years, 4 months and 8 days

Position	Gymnast	Vault 1				Vault 2				Total
Position	Gymnast	D Score	E Score	Pen.	Score 1	D Score	E Score	Pen.	Score 2	Total
1st place, gold medalist(s)	(Hungary) Zsófia Kovács	5.0	9.200		14.200	4.6	9.066		13.666	13.933
2nd place, silver medalist(s)	(Italy) Asia D'Amato	5.0	9.100		14.100	4.8	8.533		13.333	13.716
3rd place, bronze medalist(s)	(France) Aline Friess	5.4	8.566		13.966	4.4	8.833		13.233	13.599
4	(Belgium) Lisa Vaelen	5.4	8.733		14.133	4.4	8.633		13.033	13.583
5	(United Kingdom) Jessica Gadirova	5.0	9.066		14.066	4.2	8.600		12.800	13.433
6	(Denmark) Camille Rasmussen	5.0	8.766		13.766	4.4	8.600		13.000	13.383
7	(Israel) Lihie Raz	5.0	8.433	0.100	13.333	4.4	8.400	0.100	12.700	13.016
8	(Bulgaria) Valentina Georgieva	5.0	7.733		12.733				DNS	DNF

=== Uneven bars ===
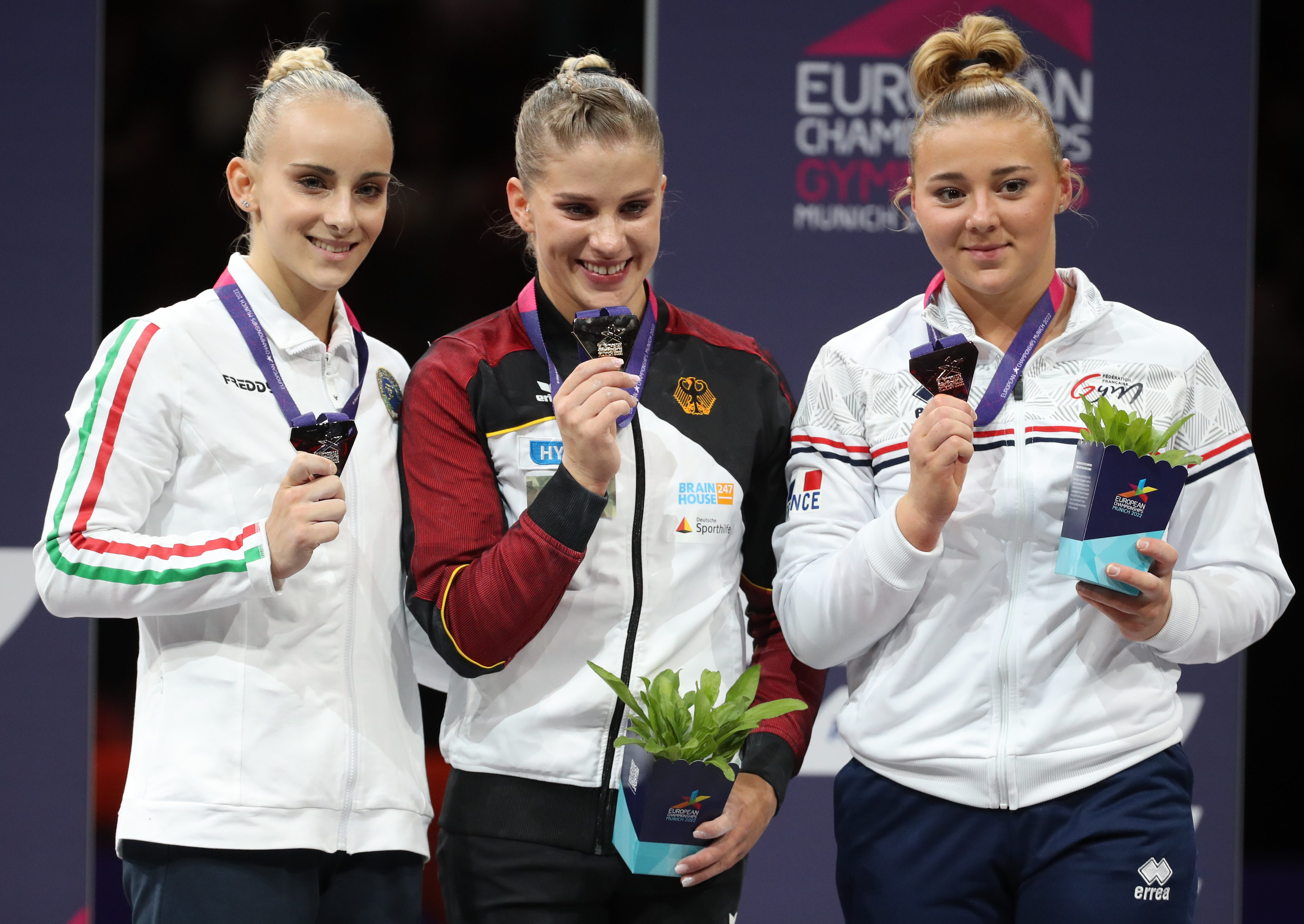
🥇 Elisabeth Seitz 🥈 Alice D'Amato 🥉 Lorette Charpy

Oldest and youngest competitors

	Name	Country	Date of birth	Age
Youngest	Giorgia Villa	Italy	February 23, 2003	19 years, 5 months and 22 days
Oldest	Kim Bui	Germany	January 28, 1989	33 years, 6 months and 17 days

Position	Gymnast	D Score	E Score	Penalty	Total
1st place, gold medalist(s)	(Germany) Elisabeth Seitz	6.1	8.333		14.433
2nd place, silver medalist(s)	(Italy) Alice D'Amato	6.1	8.300		14.400
3rd place, bronze medalist(s)	(France) Lorette Charpy	6.2	7.966		14.166
4	(Italy) Giorgia Villa	5.8	8.300		14.100
5	(Germany) Kim Bui	5.9	8.166		14.066
6	(United Kingdom) Georgia-Mae Fenton	5.6	8.033		13.633
7	(Netherlands) Naomi Visser	6.0	7.066		13.066
8	(United Kingdom) Alice Kinsella	5.4	6.266		11.666

=== Balance beam ===
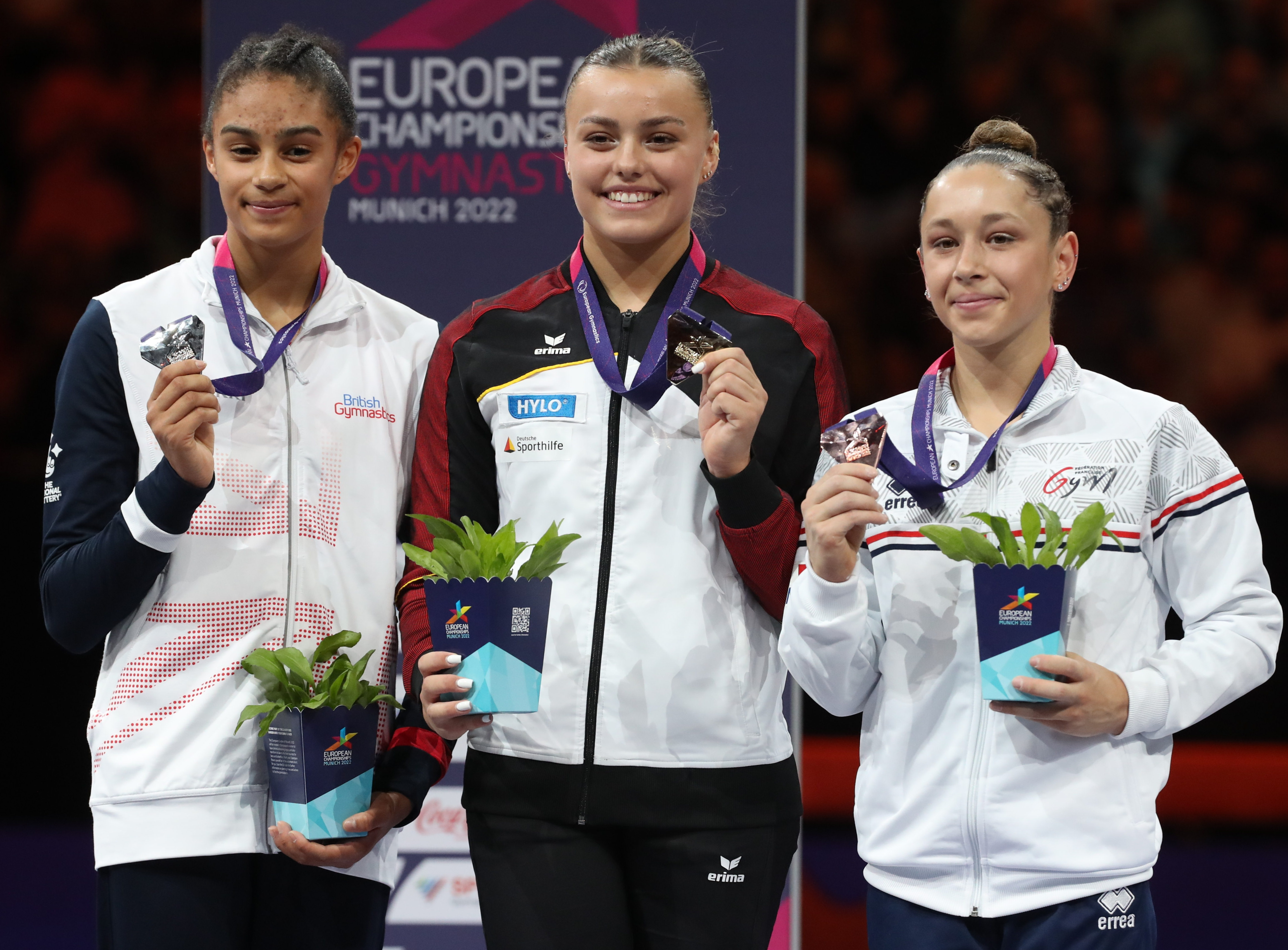
🥇 Emma Malewski 🥈 Ondine Achampong 🥉 Carolann Héduit

Oldest and youngest competitors

	Name	Country	Date of birth	Age
Youngest	Ana Bărbosu	Romania	July 26, 2006	16 years and 19 days
Oldest	Pauline Schäfer	Germany	January 4, 1997	25 years, 7 months and 10 days

Position	Gymnast	D Score	E Score	Penalty	Total
1st place, gold medalist(s)	(Germany) Emma Malewski	5.3	8.166		13.466
2nd place, silver medalist(s)	(United Kingdom) Ondine Achampong	5.5	7.900		13.400
3rd place, bronze medalist(s)	(France) Carolann Héduit	5.6	7.800		13.400
4	(Italy) Martina Maggio	5.6	7.633		13.233
5	(Germany) Pauline Schäfer	5.1	8.200	0.100	13.200
6	(Spain) Alba Petisco	5.5	6.900		12.400
7	(Italy) Giorgia Villa	4.9	7.266		12.166
8	(Romania) Ana Bărbosu	5.3	6.566	0.300	11.566

- (Italy) Asia D'Amato withdrew due to an injury sustained in the vault final. She was replaced by teammate (Italy) Martina Maggio who had not qualified due to the two-per-country rule.

=== Floor ===
Oldest and youngest competitors

	Name	Country	Date of birth	Age
Youngest	Ana Bărbosu	Romania	July 26, 2006	16 years and 19 days
Oldest	Zsófia Kovács	Hungary	April 6, 2000	22 years, 4 months and 8 days

Position	Gymnast	D Score	E Score	Penalty	Total
1st place, gold medalist(s)	(United Kingdom) Jessica Gadirova	5.7	8.300		14.000
2nd place, silver medalist(s)	(Italy) Martina Maggio	5.7	8.233		13.933
3rd place, bronze medalist(s)	(Italy) Angela Andreoli	5.8	8.066		13.866
4	(Romania) Ana Bărbosu	5.6	8.033		13.633
5	(United Kingdom) Jennifer Gadirova	5.3	8.166		13.466
6	(Netherlands) Naomi Visser	5.4	7.733		13.133
7	(France) Morgane Osyssek-Reimer	5.1	7.866	0.300	12.666
8	(Hungary) Zsófia Kovács	5.5	7.033		12.533

== Junior results ==
=== Team competition ===
Oldest and youngest competitors

	Name	Country	Date of birth	Age
Youngest	Anna Knight	Hungary	December 27, 2008	13 years, 7 months and 16 days
Oldest	Aberdeen O'Driscoll	Belgium	January 1, 2007	15 years, 7 months and 11 days

Rank	Team	Vault (gymnastics)	Uneven bars	Balance beam	Floor (gymnastics)	Total
1st place, gold medalist(s)	Italy	39.066	38.532	37.866	38.532	153.996
1st place, gold medalist(s)	Chiara Barzasi	12.700		12.400	12.566	153.996
1st place, gold medalist(s)	July Marano	13.366	12.133			153.996
1st place, gold medalist(s)	Arianna Grillo	13.000		12.700	13.066	153.996
1st place, gold medalist(s)	Martina Pieratti		13.466	12.766		153.996
1st place, gold medalist(s)	Viola Pierazzini		12.933		12.900	153.996
2nd place, silver medalist(s)	Romania	39.032	33.599	38.832	39.032	150.495
2nd place, silver medalist(s)	Amalia Ghigoarță	13.166	12.300	13.233	12.733	150.495
2nd place, silver medalist(s)	Sabrina Voinea	12.866	11.433		13.066	150.495
2nd place, silver medalist(s)	Amalia Puflea	13.000	9.866	12.833	13.233	150.495
2nd place, silver medalist(s)	Miruna Botez			12.766		150.495
2nd place, silver medalist(s)	Crina Tudor					150.495
3rd place, bronze medalist(s)	Germany	39.132	36.166	36.799	38.232	150.329
3rd place, bronze medalist(s)	Helen Kevric	13.733	12.900	12.833	13.466	150.329
3rd place, bronze medalist(s)	Meolie Jauch		11.800		12.633	150.329
3rd place, bronze medalist(s)	Marlene Gotthardt	12.766	11.466	11.466	12.133	150.329
3rd place, bronze medalist(s)	Silja Stoehr					150.329
3rd place, bronze medalist(s)	Chiara Summer Moiszi	12.633		12.500		150.329
4	Great Britain	38.399	36.133	36.132	36.899	147.563
4	Ruby Evans		11.900	11.366	12.766	147.563
4	Abigail Martin	12.700	12.133	12.533		147.563
4	Grace Davies					147.563
4	Tiegan Trafford	12.633		12.233	12.200	147.563
4	Evie Flage-Donovan	13.066	12.100		11.933	147.563
5	France	38.932	34.866	35.698	37.499	146.995
5	Lilou Viallat	12.866			12.533	146.995
5	Ambre Frotte	12.866	11.933	12.166		146.995
5	Ming Van Eijken	13.200	11.600		12.333	146.995
5	Lena Khenoun			11.366	12.633	146.995
5	Lana Pondart		11.333	12.166		146.995
6	Czech Republic	37.766	33.699	36.165	36.698	144.328
6	Sona Artamonova	12.233	11.233		12.466	144.328
6	Patricie Makovickova	12.600		11.966		144.328
6	Vanesa Masova			11.966	11.766	144.328
6	Ema Strakosova		10.933			144.328
6	Alice Vlkova	12.933	11.533	12.233	12.466	144.328
7	Belgium	36.765	34.266	35.466	36.266	142.763
7	Naomi Descamps					142.763
7	Eva Bruynseels		11.000			142.763
7	Aberdeen O'Driscoll	12.766	11.633	11.866	12.400	142.763
7	Yelena Devreker	11.866	11.633	11.800	12.066	142.763
7	Hanne Degryse	12.133		11.800	11.800	142.763
8	Switzerland	35.500	34.532	34.965	37.532	142.529
8	Vivienne Altherr		11.500			142.529
8	Kiara Raffin	11.800	11.566		12.500	142.529
8	Samira Raffin	11.600		11.366	12.766	142.529
8	Angela Pennisi			11.933	12.266	142.529
8	Lou-Anne Citherlet	12.100	11.466	11.666		142.529

=== Individual all-around ===
All gymnasts took part with no qualification. Scores were taken from team final and individual apparatus qualification session. The following is the top 10 of the individual all-around.

Position	Gymnast	Vault (gymnastics)	Uneven bars	Balance beam	Floor (gymnastics)	Total
1st place, gold medalist(s)	Helen Kevric (GER)	13.733	12.900	12.833	13.466	52.932
2nd place, silver medalist(s)	Amalia Ghigoarță (ROU)	13.166	12.300	13.233	12.733	51.432
3rd place, bronze medalist(s)	Viola Pierazzini (ITA)	12.133	12.933	12.133	12.900	50.099
4	Sabrina Voinea (ROU)	12.866	11.433	12.700	13.066	50.065
5	Anna Lashchevska (UKR)	12.433	11.533	13.066	12.666	49.698
6	Abigail Martin (GBR)	12.700	12.133	12.533	11.833	49.199
7	Alice Vlkova (CZE)	12.933	11.533	12.233	12.466	49.165
8	Ambre Frotte (FRA)	12.866	11.933	12.166	12.100	49.065
9	Amalia Puflea (ROU)	13.000	9.866	12.833	13.233	48.932
10	Chiara Barzasi (ITA)	12.700	11.266	12.400	12.566	48.932

=== Vault ===
Oldest and youngest competitors

	Name	Country	Date of birth	Age
Youngest	July Marano	Italy	September 23, 2008	13 years, 10 months and 22 days
Oldest	Laia Font	Spain	February 20, 2007	15 years, 5 months and 25 days

Position	Gymnast	Vault 1				Vault 2				Total
Position	Gymnast	D Score	E Score	Pen.	Score 1	D Score	E Score	Pen.	Score 2	Total
1st place, gold medalist(s)	(Romania) Sabrina Voinea	4.2	8.700		12.900	5.0	8.600		13.600	13.250
2nd place, silver medalist(s)	(France) Ming van Eijken	4.4	8.800		13.200	4.0	8.933		12.933	13.066
3rd place, bronze medalist(s)	(Italy) July Marano	4.6	8.633		13.233	4.2	8.633		12.833	13.033
4	(Spain) Laia Font	4.2	8.800		13.000	4.4	8.633		13.033	13.016
5	(Azerbaijan) Nazanin Teymurova	4.4	8.633		13.033	4.0	8.666		12.666	12.849
6	(Germany) Marlene Gotthardt	4.2	8.833	0.100	12.933	4.2	8.533		12.733	12.833
7	(Czech Republic) Alice Vlkova	4.4	8.333	0.300	12.433	4.2	8.500		12.700	12.566
8	(Slovakia) Lucia Dobrocka	3.8	8.766		12.566	4.2	8.300	0.100	12.400	12.483

- (Germany) Helen Kevric withdrew and was replaced by first reserve (Slovakia) Lucia Dobrocka.

=== Uneven bars ===
Oldest and youngest competitors

	Name	Country	Date of birth	Age
Youngest	Abigail Martin	Great Britain	April 19, 2008	14 years, 3 months and 26 days
Oldest	Elina Gravin	Sweden	January 25, 2007	15 years, 6 months and 20 days

Position	Gymnast	D Score	E Score	Penalty	Total
1st place, gold medalist(s)	(Italy) Martina Pieratti	5.6	7.833		13.433
2nd place, silver medalist(s)	(Germany) Helen Kevric	5.4	8.000		13.400
3rd place, bronze medalist(s)	(Italy) Viola Pierazzini	5.3	7.866		13.166
4	(Sweden) Elina Gravin	4.9	7.933		12.833
5	(United Kingdom) Evie Donovan	4.4	7.900		12.300
6	(Spain) Laia Font	4.5	7.800		12.300
7	(United Kingdom) Abigail Martin	4.6	7.666		12.266
8	(Romania) Amalia Ghigoarță	5.1	6.800		11.900

=== Balance beam ===
Oldest and youngest competitors

	Name	Country	Date of birth	Age
Youngest	Abigail Martin	Great Britain	April 19, 2008	14 years, 3 months and 26 days
Oldest	Amalia Ghigoarță	Romania	January 28, 2007	15 years, 6 months and 17 days

Position	Gymnast	D Score	E Score	Penalty	Total
1st place, gold medalist(s)	(Ukraine) Anna Lashchevska	5.4	7.800		13.200
2nd place, silver medalist(s)	(Italy) Arianna Grillo	4.8	7.866		12.666
3rd place, bronze medalist(s)	(Romania) Amalia Puflea	5.0	7.400		12.400
4	(Germany) Chiara Moiszi	4.8	7.500		12.300
5	(Italy) Martina Pieratti	5.2	6.733		11.933
6	(Romania) Amalia Ghigoarță	5.0	6.866		11.866
7	(Hungary) Bettina Czifra	4.9	6.600		11.500
8	(United Kingdom) Abigail Martin	4.6	6.700		11.300

- (Germany) Helen Kevric withdrew and was replaced by first reserve (Hungary) Bettina Czifra.

=== Floor ===
Oldest and youngest competitors

	Name	Country	Date of birth	Age
Youngest	Samira Raffin	Switzerland	May 5, 2008	14 years, 3 months and 9 days
Oldest	Elina Gravin	Sweden	January 25, 2007	15 years, 6 months and 20 days

Position	Gymnast	D Score	E Score	Penalty	Total
1st place, gold medalist(s)	(Romania) Amalia Puflea	5.1	8.133		13.233
2nd place, silver medalist(s)	(Italy) Viola Pierazzini	5.3	8.000	0.100	13.200
3rd place, bronze medalist(s)	(Romania) Sabrina Voinea	4.9	8.066		12.966
4	(United Kingdom) Ruby Evans	5.0	7.633		12.633
5	(Italy) Arianna Grillo	4.9	7.700		12.600
6	(Sweden) Elina Gravin	4.3	8.033		12.333
7	(Switzerland) Samira Raffin	4.4	7.833		12.233
8	(Ukraine) Anna Lashchevska	4.6	7.566		12.166

- (Germany) Helen Kevric withdrew and was replaced by first reserve (Ukraine) Anna Lashchevska.

== Qualification ==
=== Senior ===
==== Team competition ====
Rank	Team	Vault (gymnastics)	Uneven bars	Balance beam	Floor (gymnastics)	Total	Qual.
1	Italy	41.098	42.666	40.366	41.032	165.162	Q
1	Angela Andreoli	13.133		12.666	13.633	165.162	Q
1	Alice D'Amato	13.666	14.566		13.500	165.162	Q
1	Asia D'Amato	13.766	13.900	13.500	13.566	165.162	Q
1	Martina Maggio	13.666	13.066	13.400	13.833	165.162	Q
1	Giorgia Villa		14.200	13.466		165.162	Q
2	Great Britain	41.399	40.699	39.199	40.832	162.129	Q
2	Georgia-Mae Fenton	13.466	13.900			162.129	Q
2	Alice Kinsella	13.600	13.966	13.033	13.533	162.129	Q
2	Jessica Gadirova	13.866	12.833	12.233	13.766	162.129	Q
2	Jennifer Gadirova			12.900	13.533	162.129	Q
2	Ondine Achampong	13.933	12.233	13.266	12.666	162.129	Q
3	France	41.433	40.066	38.866	38.766	159.131	Q
3	Aline Friess	14.333	12.500	12.166	12.800	159.131	Q
3	Carolann Héduit	13.800	13.733	13.400	12.766	159.131	Q
3	Marine Boyer	13.200		13.000	12.366	159.131	Q
3	Lorette Charpy		13.833			159.131	Q
3	Morgane Osyssek-Reimer	13.300	10.433	12.466	13.200	159.131	Q
4	Germany	39.633	41.500	39.499	38.098	158.730	Q
4	Kim Bui	13.100	14.200	12.833	12.866	158.730	Q
4	Elisabeth Seitz	13.100	14.200			158.730	Q
4	Pauline Schäfer			13.166	12.766	158.730	Q
4	Sarah Voss	13.433	13.100	12.266	12.100	158.730	Q
4	Emma Malewski	12.966	13.100	13.500	12.466	158.730	Q
5	Belgium	39.899	39.566	38.866	37.332	155.663	Q
5	Noemie Louon	12.700	12.933	12.933		155.663	Q
5	Lisa Vaelen	14.200	13.500	12.933	13.066	155.663	Q
5	Maellyse Brassart	12.966	13.133		11.700	155.663	Q
5	Jutta Verkest	12.733		13.000	12.566	155.663	Q
5	Fien Enghels		12.600	12.700		155.663	Q
6	Netherlands	39.899 (6)	40.266 (7)	36.033 (6)	39.266 (6)	155.464	Q
6	Vera van Pol	13.566	12.800	12.500	12.633	155.464	Q
6	Sanna Veerman	13.200	12.800			155.464	Q
6	Tisha Volleman	12.833	13.200	11.300	13.000	155.464	Q
6	Naomi Visser	13.133	14.266	12.233	13.633	155.464	Q
6	Shadé van Oorschot			10.966	12.566	155.464	Q
7	Hungary	40.299	38.898	36.133	38.166	153.496	Q
7	Zsófia Kovács	14.066	13.366	11.900	13.433	153.496	Q
7	Zója Székely		12.466			153.496	Q
7	Gréta Mayer	12.933	11.600	12.833	12.700	153.496	Q
7	Csenge Bácskay	13.300		11.133		153.496	Q
7	Mirtill Makovits	12.100	13.066	11.400	12.033	153.496	Q
8	Spain	38.999	38.533	36.966	38.366	152.864	Q
8	Alba Petisco	13.266	12.833	13.100	12.933	152.864	Q
8	Emma Fernández	12.800	11.833	11.866	12.700	152.864	Q
8	Laura Casabuena	11.800	13.000	11.733	12.733	152.864	Q
8	Lorena Medina	12.933		12.000	12.000	152.864	Q
8	Paula Raya		12.700			152.864	Q

==== Vault ====
Rank	Gymnast	Vault 1				Vault 2				Total	Qual.
Rank	Gymnast	D Score	E Score	Pen.	Score 1	D Score	E Score	Pen.	Score 2	Total	Qual.
1	(Hungary) Zsófia Kovács	5.0	9.066		14.066	4.6	8.966		13.566	13.816	Q
2	(United Kingdom) Jessica Gadirova	5.0	8.866		13.866	4.8	8.733		13.533	13.699	Q
3	(Italy) Asia D'Amato	5.0	8.766		13.766	4.8	8.800		13.600	13.683	Q
4	(France) Aline Friess	5.4	8.933		14.333	4.4	8.500		12.900	13.616	Q
5	(Belgium) Lisa Vaelen	5.4	8.800		14.200	4.4	8.633		13.033	13.616	Q
6	(Bulgaria) Valentina Georgieva	5.0	8.866	0.100	13.766	4.4	8.700		13.100	13.433	Q
7	(Denmark) Camille Rasmussen	5.0	8.733		13.733	4.4	8.600		13.000	13.366	Q
8	(Israel) Lihie Raz	5.0	8.500		13.500	4.4	8.633		13.033	13.266	Q
9	(Hungary) Csenge Bácskay	4.6	8.700		13.300	4.4	8.700		13.100	13.200	R1
10	(France) Morgane Osyssek-Reimer	4.6	8.800	0.100	13.300	4.4	8.600		13.000	13.150	R2
11	(Israel) Ofir Netzer	4.4	8.766		13.166	4.2	8.766		12.966	13.066	R3

==== Uneven bars ====
Rank	Gymnast	D Score	E Score	Pen.	Total	Qual.
1	(Italy) Alice D'Amato	6.2	8.366		14.566	Q
2	(Netherlands) Naomi Visser	6.0	8.266		14.266	Q
3	(Italy) Giorgia Villa	5.8	8.400		14.200	Q
4	(Germany) Kim Bui	5.9	8.300		14.200	Q
5	(Germany) Elisabeth Seitz	6.0	8.200		14.200	Q
6	(United Kingdom) Alice Kinsella	5.8	8.166		13.966	Q
7	(United Kingdom) Georgia-Mae Fenton	5.8	8.100		13.900	Q
8	(Italy) Asia D'Amato	6.0	7.900		13.900	–
9	(France) Lorette Charpy	6.0	7.833		13.833	Q
10	(France) Carolann Héduit	5.9	7.833		13.733	R1
11	(Belgium) Lisa Vaelen	5.8	7.700		13.500	R2
12	(Romania) Ana Bărbosu	5.9	7.600		13.500	R3

==== Balance beam ====
Rank	Gymnast	D Score	E Score	Pen.	Total	Qual.
1	(Romania) Ana Bărbosu	5.6	7.933		13.533	Q
2	(Germany) Emma Malewski	5.2	8.300		13.500	Q
3	(Italy) Asia D'Amato	5.4	8.100		13.500	Q
4	(Italy) Giorgia Villa	5.1	8.366		13.466	Q
5	(France) Carolann Héduit	5.5	7.900		13.400	Q
6	(Italy) Martina Maggio	5.6	7.800		13.400	–
7	(United Kingdom) Ondine Achampong	5.5	7.766		13.266	Q
8	(Germany) Pauline Schäfer	5.5	7.766	0.100	13.166	Q
9	(Spain) Alba Petisco	5.5	7.600		13.100	Q
10	(United Kingdom) Alice Kinsella	5.6	7.433		13.033	R1
11	(Belgium) Jutta Verkest	5.2	7.900	0.100	13.000	R2
12	(France) Marine Boyer	5.5	7.500		13.000	R3

==== Floor ====
Rank	Gymnast	D Score	E Score	Pen.	Total	Qual.
1	(Italy) Martina Maggio	5.7	8.133		13.833	Q
2	(United Kingdom) Jessica Gadirova	5.6	8.166		13.766	Q
3	(Italy) Angela Andreoli	5.6	8.033		13.633	Q
3	(Netherlands) Naomi Visser	5.6	8.033		13.633	Q
5	(Italy) Asia D'Amato	5.4	8.166		13.566	–
6	(United Kingdom) Jennifer Gadirova	5.3	8.233		13.533	Q
7	(United Kingdom) Alice Kinsella	5.5	8.033		13.533	–
8	(Italy) Alice D'Amato	5.4	8.100		13.500	–
9	(Hungary) Zsófia Kovács	5.6	7.833		13.433	Q
10	(Romania) Ana Bărbosu	5.4	7.866		13.266	Q
11	(France) Morgane Osyssek-Reimer	5.2	8.000		13.200	Q
12	(Belgium) Lisa Vaelen	5.1	7.966		13.066	R1
13	(Netherlands) Tisha Volleman	5.0	8.000		13.000	R2
14	(Spain) Alba Petisco	5.2	7.733		12.933	R3

=== Junior ===
==== Vault ====
Rank	Gymnast	Vault 1				Vault 2				Total	Qual.
Rank	Gymnast	D Score	E Score	Pen.	Score 1	D Score	E Score	Pen.	Score 2	Total	Qual.
1	(Germany) Helen Kevric	5.0	8.733		13.733	4.2	9.000		13.200	13.466	Q
2	(Italy) July Marano	4.6	8.766		13.366	4.2	8.766		12.966	13.166	Q
3	(France) Ming Van Eijken	4.4	8.800		13.200	4.0	8.800	0.100	12.700	12.950	Q
4	(Romania) Sabrina Voinea	4.2	8.666		12.866	4.6	8.400	0.100	12.900	12.883	Q
5	(Germany) Marlene Gotthardt	4.0	8.766		12.766	4.2	8.766		12.966	12.866	Q
6	(Czech Republic) Alice Vlkova	4.4	8.533		12.933	4.2	8.400	0.100	12.500	12.716	Q
7	(Azerbaijan) Nazanin Teymurova	4.4	8.500		12.900	4.0	8.533		12.533	12.716	Q
8	(Spain) Laia Font	4.2	8.566		12.766	4.4	8.500	0.300	12.600	12.683	Q
9	(Slovakia) Lucia Dobrocka	3.8	8.733		12.533	4.2	8.566		12.766	12.649	R1
10	(Spain) Sainza Garcia-Tejada	4.2	8.700	0.100	12.800	3.6	8.800		12.400	12.600	R2
11	(Hungary) Anna Zsofia Bogyo	4.2	8.733		12.933	3.6	8.633		12.233	12.583	R3

==== Uneven bars ====
Rank	Gymnast	D Score	E Score	Pen.	Total	Qual.
1	(Italy) Martina Pieratti	5.6	7.866		13.466	Q
2	(Italy) Viola Pierazzini	5.1	7.833		12.933	Q
3	(Germany) Helen Kevric	5.4	7.500		12.900	Q
4	(Romania) Amalia Ghigoarță	5.0	7.300		12.300	Q
5	(Sweden) Elina Gravin	4.9	7.300		12.200	Q
6	(United Kingdom) Abigail Martin	4.6	7.533		12.133	Q
7	(Italy) July Marano	4.7	7.433		12.133	-
8	(United Kingdom) Evie Flage-Donovan	4.3	7.800		12.100	Q
9	(Spain) Laia Font	4.4	7.600		12.000	Q
10	(France) Ambre Frotte	4.2	7.733		11.933	R1
11	(United Kingdom) Ruby Evans	4.3	7.600		11.900	-
12	(Bulgaria) Nikol Stoimenova	4.0	7.833		11.833	R2
13	(United Kingdom) Grace Davies	4.1	7.733		11.833	-
14	(Germany) Meolie Jauch	5.1	6.700		11.800	R3

==== Balance beam ====
Rank	Gymnast	D Score	E Score	Pen.	Total	Qual.
1	(Romania) Amalia Ghigoarță	5.0	8.233		13.233	Q
2	(Ukraine) Anna Lashchevska	5.4	7.666		13.066	Q
3	(Germany) Helen Kevric	4.8	8.033		12.833	Q
4	(Romania) Amalia Puflea	5.1	7.733		12.833	Q
5	(Italy) Martina Pieratti	5.0	7.766		12.766	Q
6	(Romania) Miruna Botez	5.2	7.566		12.766	–
7	(Italy) Arianna Grillo	4.8	7.900		12.700	Q
8	(Romania) Sabrina Voinea	5.1	7.600		12.700	–
9	(United Kingdom) Abigail Martin	4.8	7.733		12.533	Q
10	(Germany) Chiara Summer Moiszi	4.8	7.700		12.500	Q
11	(Hungary) Bettina Lili Czifra	4.9	7.566		12.466	R1
12	(Italy) Chiara Barzasi	4.9	7.500		12.400	–
13	(Hungary) Anna Eileen Knight	4.3	8.000		12.300	R2
14	(Czech Republic) Alice Vlkova	4.6	7.633		12.233	R3

==== Floor ====
Rank	Gymnast	D Score	E Score	Pen.	Total	Qual.
1	(Germany) Helen Kevric	5.0	8.466		13.466	Q
2	(Romania) Amalia Puflea	5.1	8.133		13.233	Q
3	(Italy) Arianna Grillo	4.9	8.166		13.066	Q
3	(Romania) Sabrina Voinea	4.9	8.166		13.066	Q
5	(Italy) Viola Pierazzini	5.3	7.600		12.900	Q
6	(Sweden) Elina Gravin	4.5	8.333		12.833	Q
7	(Switzerland) Samira Raffin	4.4	8.366		12.766	Q
8	(United Kingdom) Ruby Evans	5.0	7.766		12.766	Q
9	(Romania) Amalia Ghigoarță	4.7	8.033		12.733	–
10	(Ukraine) Anna Lashchevska	4.8	7.866		12.666	R1
11	(France) Lena Khenoun	4.5	8.133		12.633	R2
12	(Germany) Meolie Jauch	4.6	8.033		12.633	R3

== World Championships qualification ==
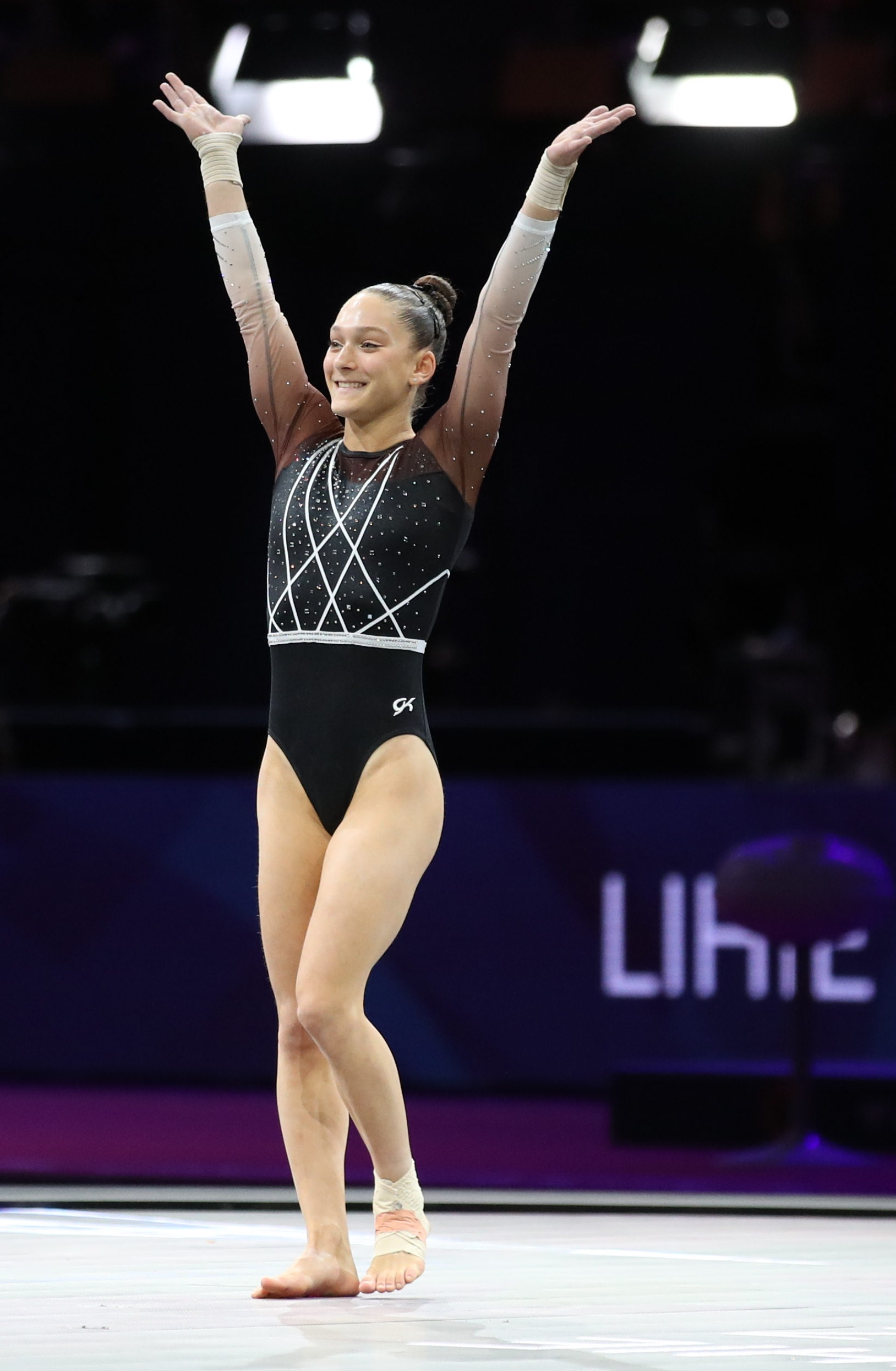
Israel's Lihie Raz at the 2022 European Championships

This event served as qualification for the 2022 World Championships in Liverpool. The top thirteen teams who qualified a full a team to compete were Italy, Great Britain, France, Germany, Belgium, Netherlands, Hungary, Spain, Romania, Finland, Austria, Ukraine, and Sweden.

The top 23 individuals (max two per country) not part of a qualified team qualified to compete as an individual. Those individuals were: Lihie Raz (ISR), Camille Rasmussen (DEN), Maria Tronrud (NOR), Lucija Hribar (SLO), Halle Hilton (IRL), Aneta Holasová (CZE), Zala Trtnik (SLO), Thelma Aðalsteinsdóttir (ISL), Klara Peterkova (CZE), Juliane Toessebro (NOR), Emma Slevin (IRL), Mariana Parente (POR), Valentina Georgieva (BUL), Sevgi Kayisoglu (TUR), Emilia Kulczynska (POL), Ofir Netzer (ISR), Anina Wildi (SUI), Freja Petersen (DEN), Bengisu Yildiz (TUR), Elvira Katsali (GRE), Tatiana Bachurina (CYP), Tara Vella Clark (MLT), and Hildur Gudmundsdottir (ISL). Additionally, since Great Britain qualified a team, their host spot was reallocated to Petra Furac (CRO).
