= Amalia Ghigoarță =

Romanian artistic gymnast

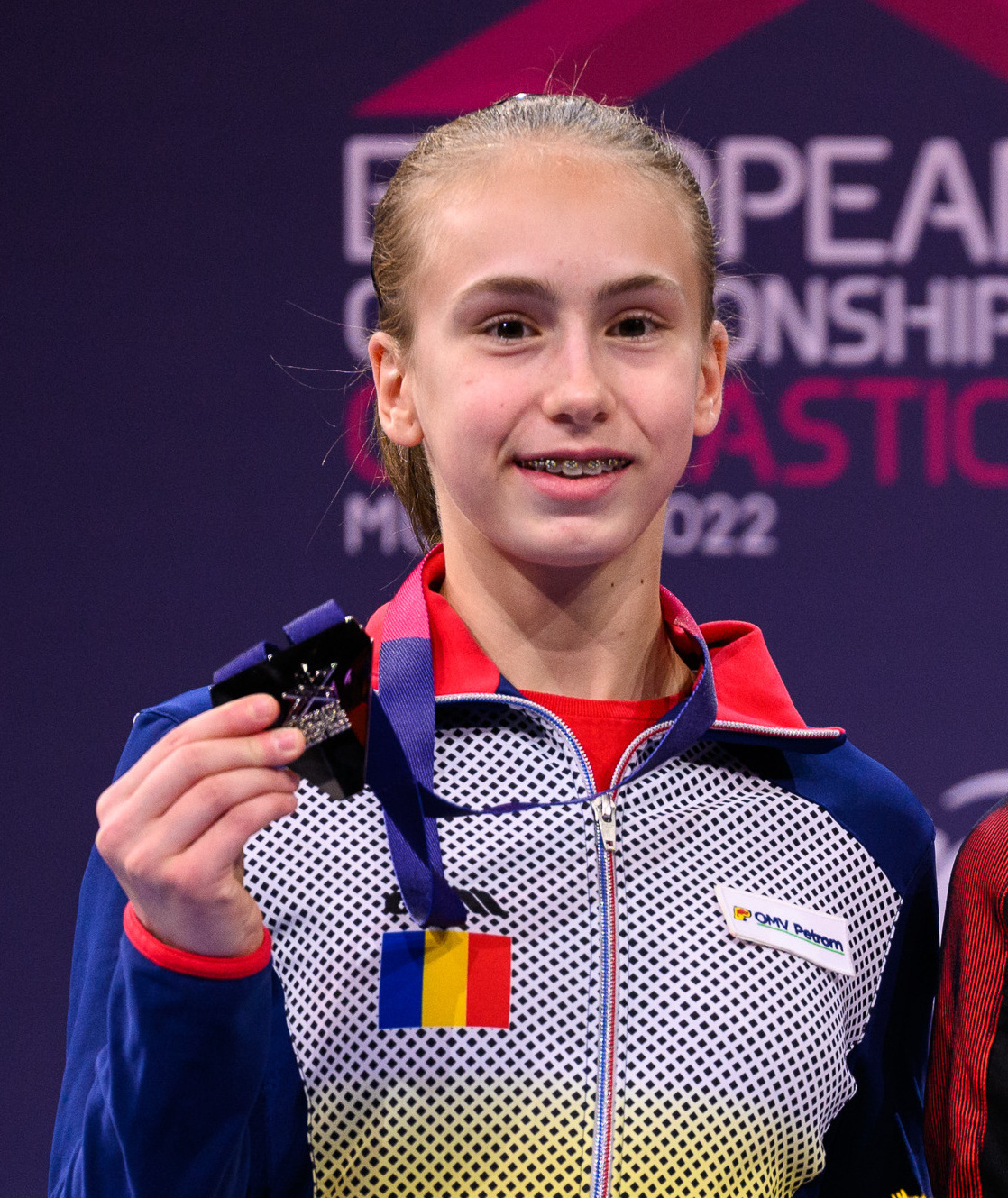
- Ghigoarță at the 2022 European Championships

Personal information
- Full name: Amalia Alexandra Ghigoarță
- Nickname: AMA
- Born: 28 January 2007 (age 19) Lugoj, Romania
- Height: 1.66 cm (1 in)

Gymnastics career
- Discipline: Women's artistic gymnastics
- Country represented: Romania (2019–2026)
- Club: Cetate Deva, CSM Oneşti
- Retired: July 30, 2026
Medal record
Representing Romania
Junior European Championships
Silver medal – second place	2022 Munich	Team
Silver medal – second place	2022 Munich	All-around

Amalia Alexandra Ghigoarță (born 28 January 2007) is a Romanian former artistic gymnast. She represented Romania at the 2024 Summer Olympics. She is the 2022 Junior European Championships team and all-around silver medalist.

== Junior gymnastics career ==
Ghigoarță began gymnastics when she was seven years old.

=== Espoir ===
Ghigoarță made her international debut at the 2019 Elek Matolay Memorial and placed fourth all-around in the espoir division. At the 2019 Petrom Cup, a domestic competition, she placed fifth all-around. She then finished second in the all-around behind Amalia Puflea at the 2019 Romanian Junior Championships in the youth age group.

=== 2020–21 ===
Ghigoarță's only competition of 2020 was the Romanian Championships in November. She placed tenth in the open all-around and won the bronze medal in the junior floor exercise final.

At the 2021 Romanian Championships, Ghigoarță only competed on the uneven bars and balance beam, finishing third and fourth, respectively. Then at the Tournoi International, she won a gold medal with teammates Andreea Preda and Sabrina Voinea and the bronze medal in the all-around. In the event finals, she won a gold medal on the floor exercise and a bronze medal on the uneven bars behind Germany's Helen Kevric.

=== 2022 ===
Ghigoarță began the 2022 season at the City of Jesolo Trophy, helping the Romanian team place fourth. Individually, she won the bronze medal on the balance beam behind Americans Tiana Sumanasekera and Madray Johnson. She then won the all-around title at the Romanian Junior Championships. She also won the all-around gold medal in the junior division of the Petrom Cup. She was selected to compete at the European Youth Olympic Festival alongside Sabrina Voinea and Amalia Puflea, and they won the team gold medal. She also placed fifth in the all-around and on the uneven bars.

Ghigoarță competed at the Junior European Championships and won a silver medal alongside her Romanian teammates. Individually, she won a silver medal in the all-around behind Germany's Helen Kevric. She also qualified for the uneven bars and balance beam event finals, placing eighth and sixth, respectively. She competed against the senior gymnasts at the Romanian Championships and won the all-around silver medal behind Ana Bărbosu. In the event finals, she won a gold medal on the floor exercise and a silver medal on the balance beam. Then at the Gymnova Cup, she won gold medals on both the balance beam and the floor exercise. She only competed on the uneven bars and the balance beam at the Romanian Junior Individual Championships, winning gold medals on both.

== Senior gymnastics career ==
=== 2023 ===
Ghigoarță became age-eligible for senior international competitions in 2023. She made her senior international debut at the European Championships and contributed on all four apparatus toward Romania's fifth-place finish. Individually, she qualified for the all-around final where she finished 19th and for the balance beam final where she finished sixth. She competed at the Heidelberg Friendly with the Romanian team that won a silver medal behind Germany. She was selected to compete at the World Championships alongside Ana Bărbosu, Lilia Cosman, Andreea Preda, and Sabrina Voinea. The team finished in tenth place, earning Romania a team berth for the Olympic Games for the first time since 2012.

=== 2024 ===
Ghigoarță competed at the 2024 European Championships and helped the Romanian team finish fourth in the team final. At the 2024 RomGym Trophy, she placed fifth in the all-around and fourth on the uneven bars, and she won a silver medal on the floor exercise behind Algeria's Kaylia Nemour. She was selected to compete at the 2024 Summer Olympics alongside Ana Bărbosu, Lilia Cosman, Andreea Preda, and Sabrina Voinea.

=== 2025–2026 ===
In early 2025 Ghigoarță verbally committed to compete for the Michigan State Spartans in NCAA gymnastics. Later that year she suffered a complete rupture of the anterior cruciate ligament, a grade 3 tear of the lateral meniscus, a grade 2 tear of the medial meniscus, and fractures of the right femoral condyle and collateral ligament.

In May 2026, Ghigoarță announced that she would instead compete for the Nebraska Cornhuskers in NCAA gymnastics. On July 30, 2026, she announced her retirement from gymnastics altogether after she tore her ACL and discovered her first surgery was not successful.

== Competitive history ==
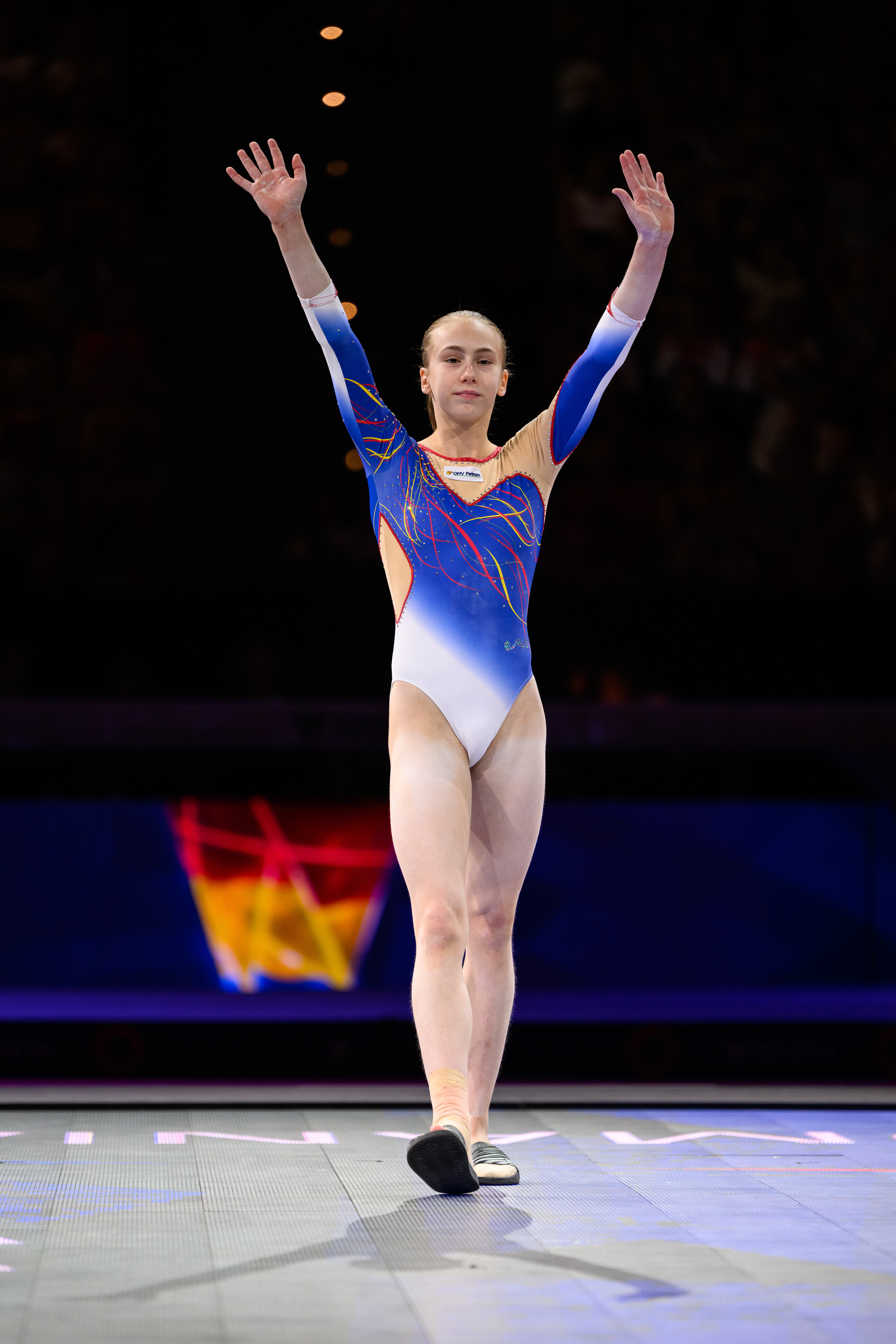
Ghigoarță at the 2022 European Championships

Competitive history of Amalia Ghigoarță at the espoir and junior level
Year	Event	Team	AA	VT	UB	BB	FX
2019	Elek Matolay Memorial		4				
2019	Petrom Cup		5				
2019	Romanian Junior Championships		2nd place, silver medalist(s)			1st place, gold medalist(s)	2nd place, silver medalist(s)
2020	Romanian Championships		10			6	3rd place, bronze medalist(s)
2021	Romanian Championships				3rd place, bronze medalist(s)	4	
2021	Tournoi International	1st place, gold medalist(s)	3rd place, bronze medalist(s)		2nd place, silver medalist(s)	4	1st place, gold medalist(s)
2022	City of Jesolo Trophy	4	6		6	3rd place, bronze medalist(s)	
2022	Romanian Junior Championships		1st place, gold medalist(s)	2nd place, silver medalist(s)	1st place, gold medalist(s)	1st place, gold medalist(s)	2nd place, silver medalist(s)
2022	Petrom Cup		1st place, gold medalist(s)	2nd place, silver medalist(s)	1st place, gold medalist(s)	1st place, gold medalist(s)	1st place, gold medalist(s)
2022	European Youth Olympic Festival	1st place, gold medalist(s)	5		5		
2022	Junior European Championships	2nd place, silver medalist(s)	2nd place, silver medalist(s)		8	6	
2022	Romanian Championships	1st place, gold medalist(s)	1st place, gold medalist(s)		6	2nd place, silver medalist(s)	1st place, gold medalist(s)
2022	Gymnova Cup		10			1st place, gold medalist(s)	1st place, gold medalist(s)
2022	Romanian Junior Individual Championships				1st place, gold medalist(s)	1st place, gold medalist(s)	

Competitive history of Amalia Ghigoarță at the senior level
Year	Event	Team	AA	VT	UB	BB	FX
2023
2023	European Championships	5	19			6	
2023	Heidelberg Friendly	2nd place, silver medalist(s)					
2023	World Championships	10					
2024
2024	European Championships	4					
2024	RomGym Trophy		5	4			2nd place, silver medalist(s)
2024	Olympic Games	7	22				
2024	Romanian Individual Championships		1st place, gold medalist(s)		2nd place, silver medalist(s)	1st place, gold medalist(s)	4
2024	Christmas Cup					2nd place, silver medalist(s)	
2025	Saint-Étienne Friendly	2nd place, silver medalist(s)					
