= Romanian Gymnastics Federation =

Sports governing body in Romania

The Romanian Gymnastics Federation (RGF), or Gymnastics Federation of Romania, is the governing body of most disciplines of gymnastics in Romania; rhythmic gymnastics in Romania has been governed by a separate federation since 2003. Established in 1906, it supervises gymnastics clubs and gymnasts' participation in international competitions.

== History ==
The Federation was founded in 1906 and joined World Gymnastics in 1907. National competitions began to be held in May 1907.

In 1936, it became a member of the Romanian Olympic and Sports Committee. The first Romanian Olympic teams were sent to the 1952 Summer Olympics. The Federation joined European Gymnastics in 1986. Aerobic gymnastics was added to the Federation's program in 1994.

== Controversies ==
In November 2025, the national women's artistic gymnastics team was dissolved after multiple allegations of abuse were made and videos were released to news media showing coach Camelia Voinea scolding her crying daughter to continue training, with gymnasts told to return to train with their affiliated club. The Federation's president, Ioan Silviu Suciu, said that an independent commission was set up to evaluate the complaints and that the Federation would implement modern safeguarding standards. Five affected gymnasts complained to the National Agency for Sports, stating that the dissolution affected their ability to train safely and remain close to their school or a hospital where they were undergoing treatment; Maria Ceplinschi noted that training in her club meant that she would need to train in the same gym where Voinea coached.

In March 2026, Daniela Sofronie, a member of the Federation's disciplinary committee, said that the committee had not yet met about the allegations.

== See also ==
- Romania women's national gymnastics team
