= 2019 Junior World Artistic Gymnastics Championships =

Gymnastics competition

1st Junior World Artistic Gymnastics Championships
- Venue: Audi Aréna
- Location: Győr, Hungary
- Dates: 27–30 June 2019

The 2019 Artistic Gymnastics Junior World Championships were the inaugural Artistic Gymnastics Junior World Championships. They were held in Győr, Hungary from 27 to 30 June 2019.

== Competition schedule ==
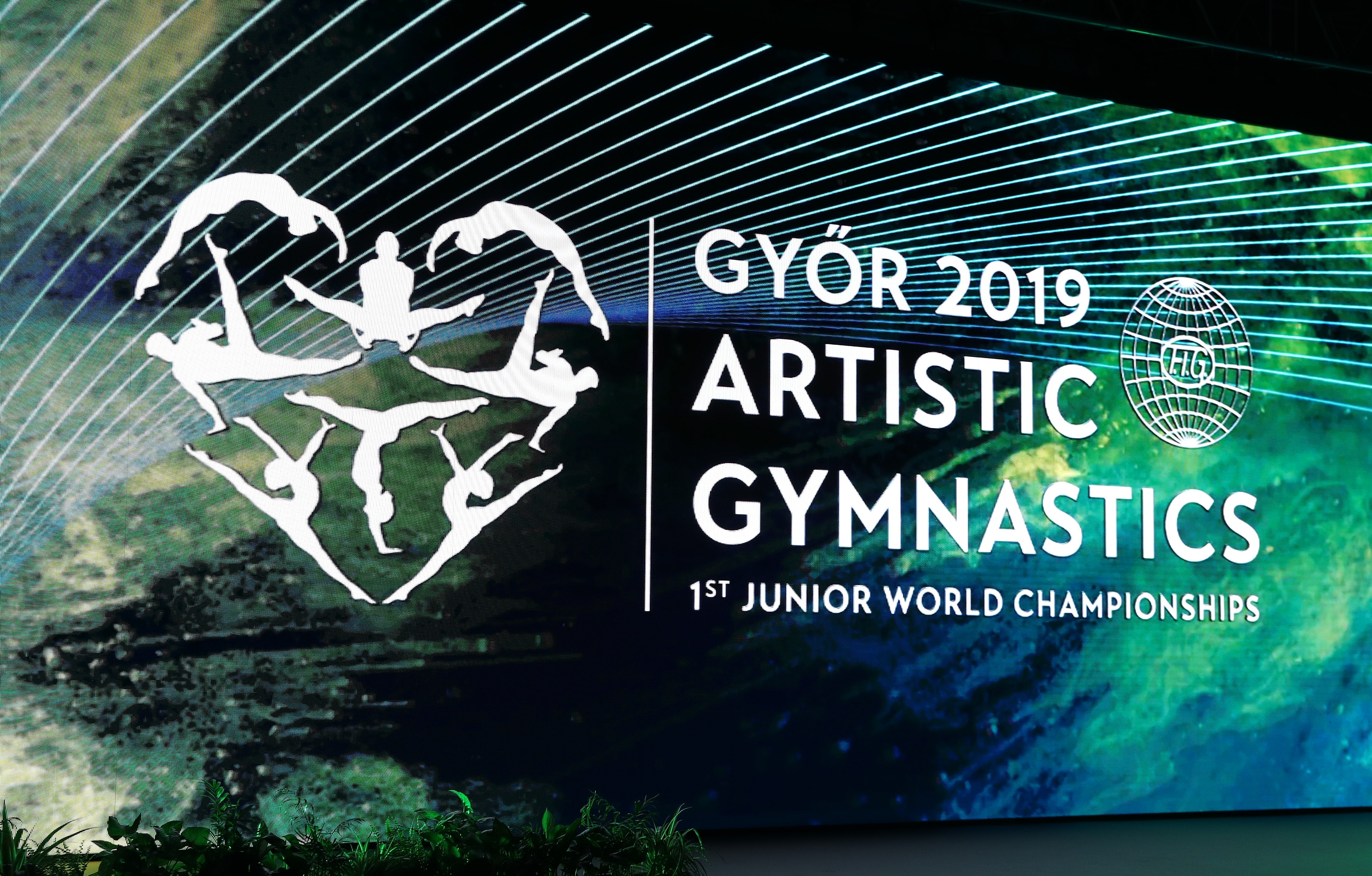
Presentation of the logo of the 2019 Junior World Artistic Gymnastics Championships during the Opening ceremony

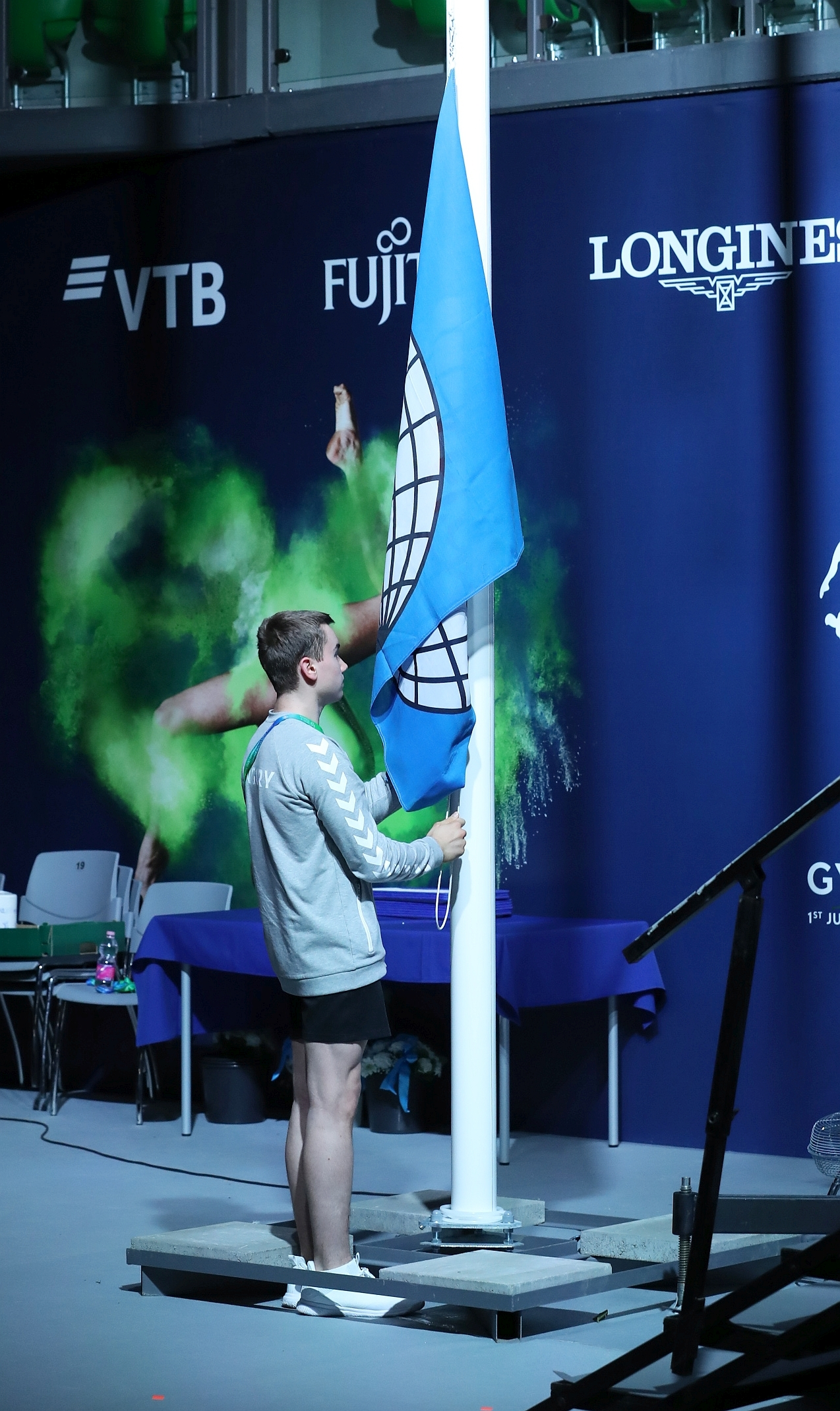
A Hungarian gymnast takes the flag of the International Gymnastics Federation down during the Closing ceremony of the event

Date	Sessions	Time	Subdivisions
Thursday 27 June	Opening ceremony	9:30–10:00	
Thursday 27 June	MAG Qualifications (for Apparatus Final); All-Around Final; Team Final		
Thursday 27 June	MAG Qualifications (for Apparatus Final); All-Around Final; Team Final	10:00-12:15	Subdivision 1
Thursday 27 June	MAG Qualifications (for Apparatus Final); All-Around Final; Team Final	13:15–15:30	Subdivision 2
Thursday 27 June	MAG Qualifications (for Apparatus Final); All-Around Final; Team Final	16:00–18:15	Subdivision 3
Thursday 27 June	MAG Qualifications (for Apparatus Final); All-Around Final; Team Final	19:15–21:30	Subdivision 4
Friday 28 June
Friday 28 June	WAG Qualifications (for Apparatus Final); All-Around Final; Team Final		
Friday 28 June	WAG Qualifications (for Apparatus Final); All-Around Final; Team Final	09:00–10:45	Subdivision 1
Friday 28 June	WAG Qualifications (for Apparatus Final); All-Around Final; Team Final	11:00–12:45	Subdivision 2
Friday 28 June	WAG Qualifications (for Apparatus Final); All-Around Final; Team Final	13:30–15:15	Subdivision 3
Friday 28 June	WAG Qualifications (for Apparatus Final); All-Around Final; Team Final	15:30–17:15	Subdivision 4
Friday 28 June	WAG Qualifications (for Apparatus Final); All-Around Final; Team Final	18:00–19:45	Subdivision 5
Friday 28 June	WAG Qualifications (for Apparatus Final); All-Around Final; Team Final	20:00–21:45	Subdivision 6
Saturday 20 June
Saturday 20 June	MAG Floor Exercise	14:00	
Saturday 20 June	WAG Vault	14:00	
Saturday 20 June	MAG Pommel Horse	14:00	
Saturday 20 June	WAG Uneven Bars	14:00	
Saturday 20 June	MAG Rings	14:00	
Sunday 30 June
Sunday 30 June	MAG Vault	14:00	
Sunday 30 June	WAG Balance Beam	14:00	
Sunday 30 June	MAG Parallel Bars	14:00	
Sunday 30 June	WAG Floor Exercise	14:00	
Sunday 30 June	MAG Horizontal Bar	14:00	
Sunday 30 June	Closing ceremony	18:00	

== Qualifiers ==
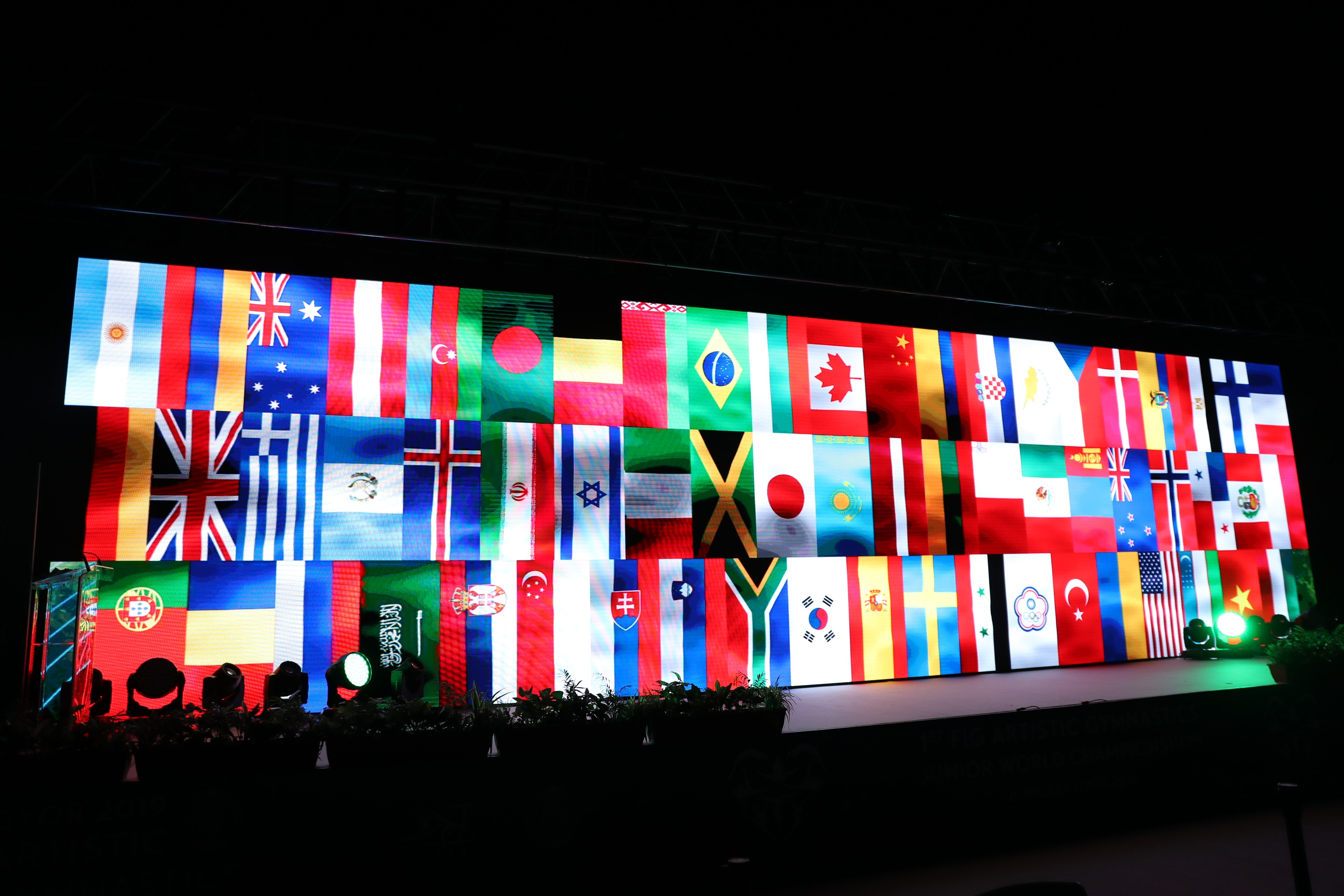
Presentation of flags of participating countries at the 2019 Junior World Artistic Gymnastics Championships

Countries that qualified athletes to the 2018 Youth Olympic Games were eligible to send a full team, other countries had to apply for a wild card. The following countries qualified a team:

=== MAG ===
- Argentina
- Australia
- Azerbaijan
- Belgium
- Brazil
- Canada
- China
- Chinese Taipei
- Croatia
- Czech Republic
- Ecuador
- Egypt
- France
- Great Britain
- Germany
- Hungary
- Iran
- Israel
- Italy
- Japan
- Kazakhstan
- Mexico
- Mongolia
- Latvia
- New Zealand
- Norway
- Puerto Rico
- Romania
- Russia
- Serbia
- South Africa
- South Korea
- Spain
- Sweden
- Turkey
- Ukraine
- United States
- Uzbekistan
- Venezuela
- Vietnam

=== WAG ===
- Algeria
- Argentina
- Australia
- Belgium
- Belarus
- Brazil
- Canada
- China
- Costa Rica
- Egypt
- Finland
- France
- Great Britain
- Germany
- Greece
- Guatemala
- Hungary
- Ireland
- Italy
- Japan
- Kazakhstan
- Lithuania
- Malaysia
- Mexico
- Panama
- Portugal
- Puerto Rico
- Romania
- Russia
- Singapore
- Spain
- South Africa
- South Korea
- Sri Lanka
- Sweden
- Turkey
- Ukraine
- United States
- Uzbekistan
- Vietnam

== Medals summary ==
=== Medalists ===
Names with an asterisk (*) denote the team alternate.

Event	Gold	Silver	Bronze
Men
Team	Japan; Ryosuke Doi; Takeru Kitazono; Shinnosuke Oka; Azusa Emata*	Ukraine; Nazar Chepurnyi; Volodymyr Kostiuk; Illia Kovtun; Dmytro Shyshko*	Italy; Lorenzo Bonicelli; Ivan Brunello; Lorenzo Minh Casali; Mirko Galimberti*
All-around	(Japan) Shinnosuke Oka	(Japan) Ryosuke Doi	(Ukraine) Illia Kovtun
Floor	(South Korea) Ryu Sung-hyun	(Canada) Félix Dolci	(Ukraine) Nazar Chepurnyi
Pommel horse	(Japan) Takeru Kitazono	(Japan) Shinnosuke Oka	(Latvia) Edvīns Rodevičs
Rings	(Canada) Félix Dolci	(Brazil) Diogo Soares	(China) Yang Haonan
Vault	(Romania) Gabriel Burtănete	(China) Yang Haonan	(United Kingdom) Jasper Smith-Gordon
Parallel bars	(Japan) Takeru Kitazono	(China) Yang Haonan	(Japan) Shinnosuke Oka
Horizontal bar	(Ukraine) Nazar Chepurnyi	(Russia) Ivan Gerget	(Hungary) Krisztián Balázs
Women
Team	Russia; Elena Gerasimova; Viktoria Listunova; Vladislava Urazova; Yana Vorona*	China; Guan Chenchen; Ou Yushan; Wei Xiaoyuan; Wu Ran*	United States; Sydney Barros; Skye Blakely; Kayla DiCello; Konnor McClain*
All-around	(Russia) Viktoria Listunova	(Russia) Vladislava Urazova	(China) Ou Yushan
Vault	(United States) Kayla DiCello	(United Kingdom) Jennifer Gadirova	(Russia) Vladislava Urazova
Uneven bars	(Russia) Vladislava Urazova	(Russia) Viktoria Listunova	(China) Wei Xiaoyuan
Balance beam	(Russia) Elena Gerasimova	(China) Wei Xiaoyuan	(United States) Kayla DiCello
Floor	(Russia) Viktoria Listunova	(China) Ou Yushan	(Russia) Elena Gerasimova

=== Medal standings ===
==== Overall ====
* Host nation (Hungary)

Rank	Nation	Gold	Silver	Bronze	Total
1	Russia (RUS)	5	3	2	10
2	Japan (JPN)	4	2	1	7
3	Ukraine (UKR)	1	1	2	4
4	Canada (CAN)	1	1	0	2
5	United States (USA)	1	0	2	3
6	Romania (ROU)	1	0	0	1
6	South Korea (KOR)	1	0	0	1
8	China (CHN)	0	5	3	8
9	Great Britain (GBR)	0	1	1	2
10	Brazil (BRA)	0	1	0	1
11	Hungary (HUN)*	0	0	1	1
11	Italy (ITA)	0	0	1	1
11	Latvia (LAT)	0	0	1	1
Totals (13 entries)		14	14	14	42

==== Boys ====
Rank	Nation	Gold	Silver	Bronze	Total
1	Japan (JPN)	4	2	1	7
2	Ukraine (UKR)	1	1	2	4
3	Canada (CAN)	1	1	0	2
4	Romania (ROU)	1	0	0	1
4	South Korea (KOR)	1	0	0	1
6	China (CHN)	0	2	1	3
7	Brazil (BRA)	0	1	0	1
7	Russia (RUS)	0	1	0	1
9	Great Britain (GBR)	0	0	1	1
9	Hungary (HUN)	0	0	1	1
9	Italy (ITA)	0	0	1	1
9	Latvia (LAT)	0	0	1	1
Totals (12 entries)		8	8	8	24

==== Girls ====
Rank	Nation	Gold	Silver	Bronze	Total
1	Russia (RUS)	5	2	2	9
2	United States (USA)	1	0	2	3
3	China (CHN)	0	3	2	5
4	Great Britain (GBR)	0	1	0	1
Totals (4 entries)		6	6	6	18

== Men's results ==
=== Team ===
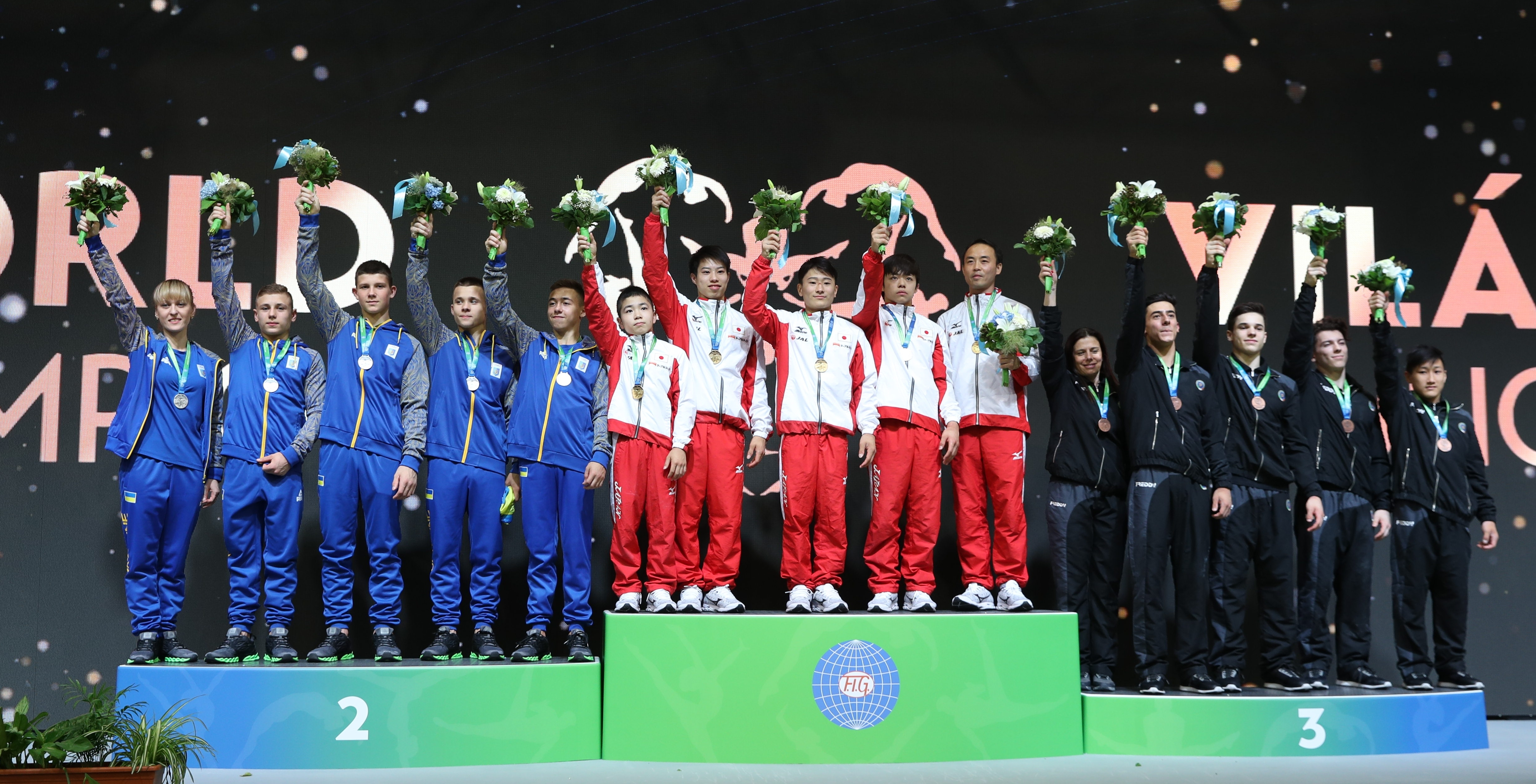
The Medal Ceremony for the Team Final Japan Ukraine Italy

Oldest and youngest competitors

	Name	Country	Date of birth	Age
Youngest	Shinnosuke Oka	Japan	31 October 2003	15 years, 7 months and 27 days
Oldest	Ryosuke Doi	Japan	7 January 2002	17 years, 5 months and 20 days

Rank	Team	Floor (gymnastics)	Pommel horse	Rings (gymnastics)	Vault (gymnastics)	Parallel bars	Horizontal bar	Total	Photos
1st place, gold medalist(s)	Japan	27.432 (2)	27.533 (1)	26.541 (5)	27.816 (8)	28.033 (1)	25.399 (9)	162.754	Category:Japan at 2019 FIG Artistic Gymnastics JWCH on Wikimedia Commons
1st place, gold medalist(s)	Ryosuke Doi	13.666	13.466	13.000	14.083	13.566	12.666	162.754	Category:Japan at 2019 FIG Artistic Gymnastics JWCH on Wikimedia Commons
1st place, gold medalist(s)	Takeru Kitazono	13.766	13.633	13.166	12.766	14.400	12.533	162.754	Category:Japan at 2019 FIG Artistic Gymnastics JWCH on Wikimedia Commons
1st place, gold medalist(s)	Shinnosuke Oka	13.300	13.900	13.375	13.733	13.633	12.733	162.754	Category:Japan at 2019 FIG Artistic Gymnastics JWCH on Wikimedia Commons
2nd place, silver medalist(s)	Ukraine	26.899 (4)	25.832 (2)	26.416 (6)	27.000 (17)	27.599 (3)	26.082 (4)	159.828	Category:Ukraine at 2019 FIG Artistic Gymnastics JWCH on Wikimedia Commons
2nd place, silver medalist(s)	Nazar Chepurnyi	13.566	12.433	13.300	12.900	13.666	13.116	159.828	Category:Ukraine at 2019 FIG Artistic Gymnastics JWCH on Wikimedia Commons
2nd place, silver medalist(s)	Volodymyr Kostiuk	13.100	12.866	13.116	12.833	13.566	12.525	159.828	Category:Ukraine at 2019 FIG Artistic Gymnastics JWCH on Wikimedia Commons
2nd place, silver medalist(s)	Illia Kovtun	13.333	12.966	12.966	14.100	13.933	12.966	159.828	Category:Ukraine at 2019 FIG Artistic Gymnastics JWCH on Wikimedia Commons
3rd place, bronze medalist(s)	Italy	26.832 (5)	25.600 (3)	26.099 (8)	27.766 (10)	26.550 (4)	26.332 (1)	159.179	Category:Italy at 2019 FIG Artistic Gymnastics JWCH on Wikimedia Commons
3rd place, bronze medalist(s)	Lorenzo Bonicelli	13.266	12.800	13.033	13.700	13.350	12.966	159.179	Category:Italy at 2019 FIG Artistic Gymnastics JWCH on Wikimedia Commons
3rd place, bronze medalist(s)	Ivan Brunello	12.400	12.800	12.933	13.966	13.133	13.366	159.179	Category:Italy at 2019 FIG Artistic Gymnastics JWCH on Wikimedia Commons
3rd place, bronze medalist(s)	Lorenzo Minh Casali	13.566	12.566	13.066	13.800	13.200	12.600	159.179	Category:Italy at 2019 FIG Artistic Gymnastics JWCH on Wikimedia Commons
4	China	24.633 (22)	25.591 (4)	27.199 (1)	28.266 (2)	27.832 (2)	25.183 (10)	158.704	Category:China at 2019 FIG Artistic Gymnastics JWCH on Wikimedia Commons
4	Li Hongyan	12.333	12.400	12.733	14.066	13.566	12.700	158.704	Category:China at 2019 FIG Artistic Gymnastics JWCH on Wikimedia Commons
4	Yang Haonan	12.300	13.166	13.733	14.200	14.266	11.633	158.704	Category:China at 2019 FIG Artistic Gymnastics JWCH on Wikimedia Commons
4	Yang Yanzhi	11.400	12.425	13.466	13.266	12.833	12.483	158.704	Category:China at 2019 FIG Artistic Gymnastics JWCH on Wikimedia Commons
5	Canada	26.832 (5)	24.833 (8)	26.866 (2)	28.166 (4)	26.066 (13)	25.800 (6)	158.563	Category:Canada at 2019 FIG Artistic Gymnastics JWCH on Wikimedia Commons
5	Ioannis Chronopoulos	11.791	12.033	12.400	12.833	12.633	9.516	158.563	Category:Canada at 2019 FIG Artistic Gymnastics JWCH on Wikimedia Commons
5	Félix Dolci	13.666	11.900	13.666	14.533	13.066	12.900	158.563	Category:Canada at 2019 FIG Artistic Gymnastics JWCH on Wikimedia Commons
5	Evgeny Siminiuc	13.166	12.800	13.200	13.633	13.000	12.900	158.563	Category:Canada at 2019 FIG Artistic Gymnastics JWCH on Wikimedia Commons
6	South Korea	27.466 (1)	24.866 (7)	24.900 (17)	28.066 (6)	26.166 (11)	25.133 (11)	156.597	Category:Korea at 2019 FIG Artistic Gymnastics JWCH on Wikimedia Commons
6	Park Jin-ho	13.500	12.300	12.033	14.066	13.400	12.466	156.597	Category:Korea at 2019 FIG Artistic Gymnastics JWCH on Wikimedia Commons
6	Park Seung-ho	12.966	12.566	12.800	14.000	12.600	12.500	156.597	Category:Korea at 2019 FIG Artistic Gymnastics JWCH on Wikimedia Commons
6	Ryu Sung-hyun	13.966	11.766	12.100	12.700	12.766	12.633	156.597	Category:Korea at 2019 FIG Artistic Gymnastics JWCH on Wikimedia Commons
7	United States	26.466 (7)	24.274 (11)	24.766 (3)	28.133 (5)	25.900 (15)	25.041 (13)	156.580	Category:United States at 2019 FIG Artistic Gymnastics JWCH on Wikimedia Commons
7	Garrett Braunton	11.700	12.341	13.433	14.000	13.000	12.633	156.580	Category:United States at 2019 FIG Artistic Gymnastics JWCH on Wikimedia Commons
7	Matthew Cormier	13.633	11.933	12.933	13.100	12.900	12.408	156.580	Category:United States at 2019 FIG Artistic Gymnastics JWCH on Wikimedia Commons
7	Isaiah Drake	12.833	11.000	13.333	14.133	12.166	11.600	156.580	Category:United States at 2019 FIG Artistic Gymnastics JWCH on Wikimedia Commons
8	Germany	26.366 (8)	24.433 (10)	25.833 (9)	27.766 (10)	26.166 (11)	25.925 (5)	156.489	Category:Germany at 2019 FIG Artistic Gymnastics JWCH on Wikimedia Commons
8	Arne Nicolai Halbisch	13.066	12.133	13.000	13.900	11.666	13.100	156.489	Category:Germany at 2019 FIG Artistic Gymnastics JWCH on Wikimedia Commons
8	Nils Matache	13.300	11.966	12.200	13.866	13.200	12.600	156.489	Category:Germany at 2019 FIG Artistic Gymnastics JWCH on Wikimedia Commons
8	Valentin Zapf	12.791	12.300	12.833	13.400	12.966	12.825	156.489	Category:Germany at 2019 FIG Artistic Gymnastics JWCH on Wikimedia Commons

=== Individual all-around ===
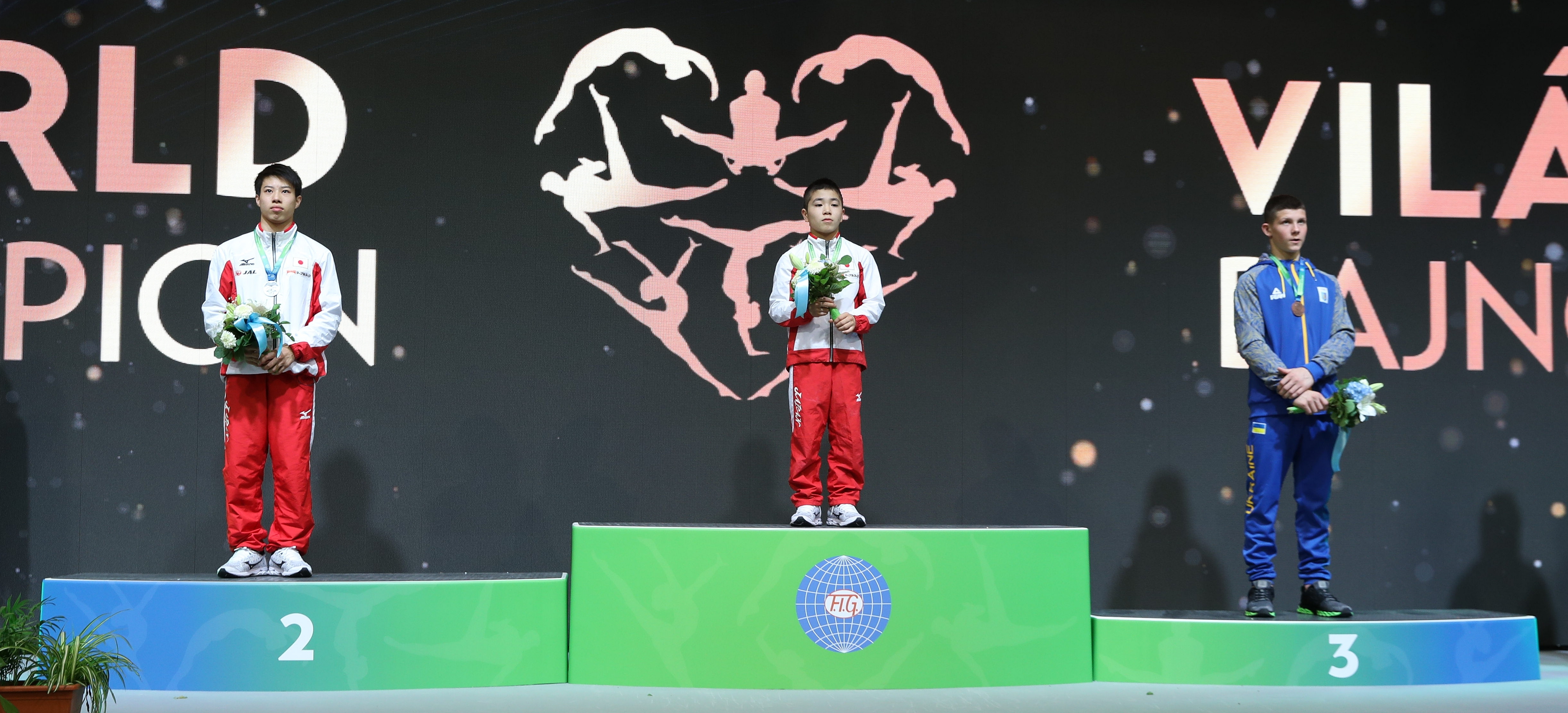
The Medal Ceremony for the Individual all-around Shinnosuke Oka (Japan) Ryosuke Doi (Japan) Illia Kovtun (Ukraine)

Oldest and youngest competitors

	Name	Country	Date of birth	Age
Youngest	Shinnosuke Oka	Japan	31 October 2003	15 years, 7 months and 27 days
Oldest	Ryosuke Doi	Japan	7 January 2002	17 years, 5 months and 20 days

Rank	Gymnast	Floor (gymnastics)	Pommel horse	Rings (gymnastics)	Vault (gymnastics)	Parallel bars	Horizontal bar	Total	Photos
1st place, gold medalist(s)	(Japan) Shinnosuke Oka	13.300	13.900	13.375	13.733	13.633	12.733	80.674	Category:Shinnosuke Oka at 2019 FIG Artistic Gymnastics JWCH/All-around competition on Wikimedia Commons
2nd place, silver medalist(s)	(Japan) Ryosuke Doi	13.666	13.466	13.000	14.083	13.566	12.666	80.447	Category:Ryosuke Doi at 2019 FIG Artistic Gymnastics JWCH/All-around competition on Wikimedia Commons
–	(Japan) Takeru Kitazono	13.766	13.633	13.166	12.766	14.400	12.533	80.264	Category:Takeru Kitazono at 2019 FIG Artistic Gymnastics JWCH/All-around competition on Wikimedia Commons
3rd place, bronze medalist(s)	(Ukraine) Illia Kovtun	13.333	12.966	12.966	14.100	13.933	12.966	80.264	Category:Illia Kovtun at 2019 FIG Artistic Gymnastics JWCH/All-around competition on Wikimedia Commons
4	(Canada) Félix Dolci	13.666	11.900	13.666	14.533	13.066	12.900	79.731	Category:Félix Dolci at 2019 FIG Artistic Gymnastics JWCH/All-around competition on Wikimedia Commons
5	(China) Yang Haonan	12.300	13.166	13.733	14.200	14.266	11.633	79.298	Category:Haonan Yang at 2019 FIG Artistic Gymnastics JWCH/All-around competition on Wikimedia Commons
6	(Italy) Lorenzo Bonicelli	13.266	12.800	13.033	13.700	13.350	12.966	79.115	Category:Lorenzo Bonicelli at 2019 FIG Artistic Gymnastics JWCH on Wikimedia Commons
7	(Ukraine) Nazar Chepurnyi	13.566	12.433	13.300	12.900	13.666	13.116	78.981	Category:Nazar Chepurnyi at 2019 FIG Artistic Gymnastics JWCH/All-around competition on Wikimedia Commons
8	(Italy) Lorenzo Minh Casali	13.566	12.566	13.066	13.800	13.200	12.600	78.798	Category:Lorenzo Minh Casali at 2019 FIG Artistic Gymnastics JWCH/All-around competition on Wikimedia Commons
9	(Canada) Evgeny Siminiuc	13.166	12.800	13.200	13.633	13.000	12.900	78.699	Category:Evgeny Siminiuc at 2019 FIG Artistic Gymnastics JWCH on Wikimedia Commons
–	(Italy) Ivan Brunello	12.400	12.800	12.933	13.966	13.133	13.366	78.598	Category:Ivan Brunello at 2019 FIG Artistic Gymnastics JWCH/All-around competition on Wikimedia Commons
–	(Ukraine) Volodymyr Kostiuk	13.100	12.866	13.116	12.833	13.566	12.525	78.006	Category:Volodymyr Kostiuk at 2019 FIG Artistic Gymnastics JWCH on Wikimedia Commons
10	(Brazil) Diogo Soares	12.933	10.866	13.533	13.900	13.391	13.366	77.989	Category:Diogo Soares at 2019 FIG Artistic Gymnastics JWCH/All-around competition on Wikimedia Commons
11	(Russia) Ivan Kuliak	12.300	11.866	13.466	13.866	13.466	12.966	77.930	Category:Ivan Kuliak at 2019 FIG Artistic Gymnastics JWCH/All-around competition on Wikimedia Commons
12	(France) Lucas Desanges	12.766	12.166	12.433	13.833	13.283	13.366	77.847	Category:Lucas Desanges at 2019 FIG Artistic Gymnastics JWCH/All-around competition on Wikimedia Commons
13	(China) Li Hongyan	12.333	12.400	12.733	14.066	13.566	12.700	77.798	Category:Hongyan Li at 2019 FIG Artistic Gymnastics JWCH/All-around competition on Wikimedia Commons
14	(South Korea) Park Jin-ho	13.500	12.300	12.033	14.066	13.400	12.466	77.765	Category:Jinho Park at 2019 FIG Artistic Gymnastics JWCH on Wikimedia Commons
15	(South Korea) Park Seung-ho	12.966	12.566	12.800	14.000	12.600	12.500	77.432	Category:Seungho Park at 2019 FIG Artistic Gymnastics JWCH on Wikimedia Commons
16	(Romania) Gabriel Burtănete	12.633	12.300	12.733	14.366	13.300	12.066	77.398	Category:Gabriel Burtănete at 2019 FIG Artistic Gymnastics JWCH on Wikimedia Commons
17	(Germany) Nils Matache	13.300	11.966	12.200	13.866	13.200	12.600	77.132	Category:Nils Matache at 2019 FIG Artistic Gymnastics JWCH on Wikimedia Commons
18	(Germany) Valentin Zapf	12.791	12.300	12.833	13.400	12.966	12.825	77.115	Category:Valentin Zapf at 2019 FIG Artistic Gymnastics JWCH on Wikimedia Commons
19	(United States) Garrett Braunton	11.700	12.341	13.433	14.000	13.000	12.633	77.107	Category:Garrett Braunton at 2019 FIG Artistic Gymnastics JWCH on Wikimedia Commons
20	(Brazil) Patrick Sampaio	12.066	12.300	13.200	13.666	13.025	12.833	77.090	Category:Patrick Sampaio at 2019 FIG Artistic Gymnastics JWCH on Wikimedia Commons
21	(United States) Matthew Cormier	13.633	11.933	12.933	13.100	12.900	12.408	76.907	Category:Matthew Cormier at 2019 FIG Artistic Gymnastics JWCH/All-around competition on Wikimedia Commons
–	(Germany) Arne Nicolai Halbisch	13.066	12.133	13.000	13.900	11.666	13.100	76.865	Category:Arne Nicolai Halbisch at 2019 FIG Artistic Gymnastics JWCH/All-around competition on Wikimedia Commons
22	(France) Leo Saladino	13.033	11.566	13.266	14.300	13.266	11.433	76.864	Category:Leo Saladino at 2019 FIG Artistic Gymnastics JWCH on Wikimedia Commons
23	(United Kingdom) Luke Whitehouse	13.333	11.966	12.741	13.933	12.966	11.800	76.739	Category:Luke Whitehouse at 2019 FIG Artistic Gymnastics JWCH on Wikimedia Commons
24	(Russia) Ivan Gerget	12.700	12.600	12.200	13.200	12.800	13.166	76.666	Category:Ivan Gerget at 2019 FIG Artistic Gymnastics JWCH/All-around competition on Wikimedia Commons
25	(Australia) Jesse Moore	12.833	10.700	12.533	13.866	13.366	13.116	76.414	Category:Jesse Moore at 2019 FIG Artistic Gymnastics JWCH on Wikimedia Commons
–	(Russia) Kirill Gashkov	12.533	12.400	12.933	13.033	12.500	12.991	76.390	Category:Kirill Gashkov at 2019 FIG Artistic Gymnastics JWCH on Wikimedia Commons
26	(Azerbaijan) Samad Mammadli	13.033	12.900	12.300	13.300	12.433	12.166	76.132	Category:Samad Mammadli at 2019 FIG Artistic Gymnastics JWCH/All-around competition on Wikimedia Commons
27	(Romania) Robert Burtănete	12.800	12.366	12.866	13.500	12.933	11.633	76.098	Category:Robert Burtănete at 2019 FIG Artistic Gymnastics JWCH on Wikimedia Commons
–	(South Korea) Sunghyun Ryu	13.966	11.766	12.100	12.700	12.766	12.633	75.931	Category:Ryu Sung-hyun at 2019 FIG Artistic Gymnastics JWCH/All-around competition on Wikimedia Commons
–	(China) Yanzhi Yang	11.400	12.425	13.466	13.266	12.833	12.483	75.873	Category:Yanzhi Yang at 2019 FIG Artistic Gymnastics JWCH/All-around competition on Wikimedia Commons
28	(United Kingdom) Sam Mostowfi	13.633	11.633	12.433	13.766	12.000	12.400	75.865	Category:Sam Mostowfi at 2019 FIG Artistic Gymnastics JWCH/All-around competition on Wikimedia Commons
29	(Vietnam) Nguyễn Văn Khánh Phong	12.300	12.300	12.966	13.766	12.066	11.900	75.298	Category:Nguyễn Văn Khánh Phong at 2019 FIG Artistic Gymnastics JWCH on Wikimedia Commons
30	(Hungary) Krisztián Balázs	13.266	10.766	11.500	12.733	13.833	13.133	75.231	Category:Krisztián Balázs at 2019 FIG Artistic Gymnastics JWCH on Wikimedia Commons
31	(Sweden) Marcus Stenberg	12.866	11.975	12.366	13.166	12.366	12.400	75.139	Category:Marcus Stenberg at 2019 FIG Artistic Gymnastics JWCH on Wikimedia Commons
32	(Australia) Kiplin Smith	12.333	12.666	12.666	13.466	11.433	12.566	75.130	Category:Kiplin Smith at 2019 FIG Artistic Gymnastics JWCH on Wikimedia Commons
–	(United States) Isaiah Drake	12.833	11.000	13.333	14.133	12.166	11.600	75.065	Category:Isaiah Drake at 2019 FIG Artistic Gymnastics JWCH/All-around competition on Wikimedia Commons
33	(Belgium) Nicola Cuyle	13.166	11.900	12.333	13.500	12.100	11.966	74.965	Category:Nicola Cuyle at 2019 FIG Artistic Gymnastics JWCH on Wikimedia Commons
34	(Uzbekistan) Utkirbek Juraev	12.766	12.600	11.900	12.866	12.566	12.266	74.964	Category:Utkirbek Juraev at 2019 FIG Artistic Gymnastics JWCH on Wikimedia Commons
35	(Turkey) Kerem Şener	12.066	11.966	12.500	12.866	13.700	11.766	74.864	Category:Kerem Sener at 2019 FIG Artistic Gymnastics JWCH/All-around competition on Wikimedia Commons
36	(Belgium) Victor Martinez	12.633	12.200	10.700	14.266	13.441	11.333	74.573	Category:Victor Martinez at 2019 FIG Artistic Gymnastics JWCH on Wikimedia Commons
–	(France) Arthur Ballon	12.700	10.400	12.416	13.933	12.866	12.133	74.448	Category:Arthur Ballon at 2019 FIG Artistic Gymnastics JWCH on Wikimedia Commons
37	(Spain) Sergio Moreno	12.283	11.933	12.633	13.566	13.141	10.825	74.381	Category:Sergio Moreno at 2019 FIG Artistic Gymnastics JWCH on Wikimedia Commons
38	(Turkey) Emre Dodanlı	13.091	9.966	12.300	13.600	12.816	12.100	73.873	Category:Emre Dodanli at 2019 FIG Artistic Gymnastics JWCH on Wikimedia Commons
–	(Turkey) Bora Tarhan	11.666	11.266	12.766	13.366	12.633	12.166	73.863	Category:Bora Tarhan at 2019 FIG Artistic Gymnastics JWCH on Wikimedia Commons
39	(Armenia) Gagik Khachikyan	12.233	13.100	12.366	11.866	12.333	11.900	73.798	Category:Gagik Khachikyan at 2019 FIG Artistic Gymnastics JWCH on Wikimedia Commons
40	(Kazakhstan) Oleg Chubenko	12.366	11.066	12.208	13.700	12.400	11.700	73.440	Category:Oleg Chubenko at 2019 FIG Artistic Gymnastics JWCH on Wikimedia Commons
41	(Latvia) Edvīns Rodevičs	12.200	13.066	11.100	13.000	12.366	11.666	73.398	Category:Edvins Rodevics at 2019 FIG Artistic Gymnastics JWCH on Wikimedia Commons
42	(Ecuador) Pablo Calvache	11.900	11.633	12.533	13.600	11.466	12.200	73.332	Category:Pablo Calvache at 2019 FIG Artistic Gymnastics JWCH on Wikimedia Commons
–	(Australia) James Hardy	12.000	11.533	12.066	13.666	12.425	11.633	73.323	Category:James Hardy at 2019 FIG Artistic Gymnastics JWCH/All-around competition on Wikimedia Commons
43	(Greece) Alkinoos Graikos	11.333	12.433	11.700	13.800	12.633	11.666	73.265	Category:Alkinoos Nikolaos Graikos at 2019 FIG Artistic Gymnastics JWCH on Wikimedia Commons
–	(Brazil) João Vieira	12.200	11.066	11.666	13.900	12.733	11.666	73.231	Category:João Vieira at 2019 FIG Artistic Gymnastics JWCH/All-around competition on Wikimedia Commons
44	(Argentina) Fernando Espíndola	12.100	11.100	12.333	13.666	12.033	11.900	73.132	Category:Fernando Espíndola at 2019 FIG Artistic Gymnastics JWCH on Wikimedia Commons
45	(New Zealand) Sam Dick	12.533	9.433	12.600	13.966	12.733	11.666	72.931	Category:Sam Dick at 2019 FIG Artistic Gymnastics JWCH/All-around competition on Wikimedia Commons
46	(Egypt) Mohamed Moussa	12.166	12.566	12.200	12.466	12.433	10.966	72.797	Category:Mohamed Moussa at 2019 FIG Artistic Gymnastics JWCH on Wikimedia Commons
47	(Argentina) Santiago Gómez	12.133	12.133	11.833	12.900	12.333	11.166	72.498	Category:Santiago Gómez at 2019 FIG Artistic Gymnastics JWCH on Wikimedia Commons
48	(Portugal) José Nogueira	12.791	10.733	12.600	13.966	10.966	11.266	72.322	Category:José Nogueira at 2019 FIG Artistic Gymnastics JWCH on Wikimedia Commons
–	(United Kingdom) Jasper Smith-Gordon	13.200	11.533	11.866	14.366	10.733	10.566	72.264	Category:Jasper Smith-Gordon at 2019 FIG Artistic Gymnastics JWCH on Wikimedia Commons
49	(Mexico) Maximiliano Galicia	12.433	10.133	12.000	13.800	11.433	12.400	72.199	Category:Maximiliano Galicia at 2019 FIG Artistic Gymnastics JWCH on Wikimedia Commons
50	(Chinese Taipei) Min-Han Chiou	12.333	10.300	12.266	13.333	11.933	11.900	72.065	Category:Min-Han Chiou at 2019 FIG Artistic Gymnastics JWCH on Wikimedia Commons
51	(Spain) Daniel Tuya Pérez	12.000	11.866	12.566	13.500	12.033	10.033	71.998	Category:Daniel Tuya Pérez at 2019 FIG Artistic Gymnastics JWCH on Wikimedia Commons
52	(Bulgaria) Teodor Trifonov	12.100	11.066	11.533	12.833	12.333	12.066	71.931	Category:Teodor Trifonov at 2019 FIG Artistic Gymnastics JWCH on Wikimedia Commons
–	(Spain) Hugo Rebollar	12.433	11.500	12.966	12.866	12.466	9.666	71.897	Category:Hugo Rebollar at 2019 FIG Artistic Gymnastics JWCH on Wikimedia Commons
53	(South Africa) Ruan Lange	12.133	12.066	12.200	11.900	11.700	11.866	71.865	Category:Ruan Lange at 2019 FIG Artistic Gymnastics JWCH on Wikimedia Commons
54	(Iran) Amir Ali Ghahremani	12.000	11.600	11.900	12.633	12.008	11.300	71.441	Category:Amir Ali Ghahremani at 2019 FIG Artistic Gymnastics JWCH on Wikimedia Commons
55	(Latvia) Edgars Čudovskis	11.433	11.033	12.366	13.466	11.766	11.366	71.430	Category:Edgars Cudovskis at 2019 FIG Artistic Gymnastics JWCH on Wikimedia Commons
56	(Egypt) Abdelrahman Abdelhaleem	11.600	12.800	10.700	13.000	12.066	11.133	71.299	Category:Abdelrahman Abdelhaleem at 2019 FIG Artistic Gymnastics JWCH on Wikimedia Commons
57	(Finland) Akseli Karsikas	11.066	10.900	12.400	13.200	11.466	12.200	71.232	Category:Akseli Karsikas at 2019 FIG Artistic Gymnastics JWCH on Wikimedia Commons
–	(Canada) Ioannis Chronopoulos	11.791	12.033	12.400	12.833	12.633	9.516	71.206	Category:Ioannis Chronopoulos at 2019 FIG Artistic Gymnastics JWCH on Wikimedia Commons
58	(Norway) Didrik Gundersen	12.833	10.266	12.266	13.033	11.533	11.266	71.197	Category:Didrik Gundersen at 2019 FIG Artistic Gymnastics JWCH on Wikimedia Commons
–	(Egypt) Omar Elshobki	11.366	12.775	12.333	11.266	11.366	12.000	71.106	Category:Omar Elshobki at 2019 FIG Artistic Gymnastics JWCH on Wikimedia Commons
59	(Hungary) Ádám Dobrovitz	11.200	10.400	12.666	12.975	11.866	11.933	71.040	Category:Ádám Dobrovitz at 2019 FIG Artistic Gymnastics JWCH on Wikimedia Commons
–	(Belgium) Glen Cuyle	12.200	9.533	12.100	12.400	12.600	12.166	70.999	Category:Glen Cuyle at 2019 FIG Artistic Gymnastics JWCH on Wikimedia Commons
60	(New Zealand) William Fu-Allen	11.333	11.300	11.966	13.600	11.766	10.766	70.731	Category:William Fu-Allen at 2019 FIG Artistic Gymnastics JWCH on Wikimedia Commons
61	(Norway) Iver Heggelund	12.366	11.066	11.641	12.700	12.166	10.633	70.572	Category:Iver Heggelund at 2019 FIG Artistic Gymnastics JWCH on Wikimedia Commons
–	(Romania) Raul Gabriel Soica	11.633	11.800	11.350	12.300	11.933	11.433	70.449	Category:Raul Gabriel Soica at 2019 FIG Artistic Gymnastics JWCH on Wikimedia Commons
–	(Hungary) Szabolcs Bátori	10.266	11.333	12.266	12.733	12.366	11.433	70.397	Category:Szabolcs Bátori at 2019 FIG Artistic Gymnastics JWCH on Wikimedia Commons
62	(Lithuania) Gytis Chasazyrovas	11.233	12.291	11.533	12.700	10.700	11.866	70.323	Category:Gytis Chasazyrovas at 2019 FIG Artistic Gymnastics JWCH on Wikimedia Commons
63	(Slovakia) Matej Nemčovič	11.300	10.466	12.066	12.300	12.500	11.233	69.865	Category:Matej Nemčovič at 2019 FIG Artistic Gymnastics JWCH on Wikimedia Commons
64	(Iceland) Jónas Ingi Þórisson	12.600	9.266	12.066	13.266	11.100	11.466	69.764	Category:Jonas Ingi Thorisson at 2019 FIG Artistic Gymnastics JWCH on Wikimedia Commons
–	(Norway) Joar Amblie	11.700	10.400	12.166	11.666	12.566	11.266	69.764	Category:Joar Amblie at 2019 FIG Artistic Gymnastics JWCH on Wikimedia Commons
65	(Iran) Mahdyar Salmanicharani	11.500	11.600	11.300	11.166	12.300	11.666	69.532	Category:Mahdyar Salmanicharani at 2019 FIG Artistic Gymnastics JWCH on Wikimedia Commons
66	(Bangladesh) Ali Kader Haque	12.300	9.600	11.066	13.133	12.166	10.900	69.165	Category:Ali Kader Haque at 2019 FIG Artistic Gymnastics JWCH on Wikimedia Commons
67	(Czech Republic) Vojtech Šácha	12.633	10.466	9.866	11.866	12.266	11.833	68.930	Category:Vojtech Šácha at 2019 FIG Artistic Gymnastics JWCH on Wikimedia Commons
68	(Poland) Kacper Garnczarek	11.866	11.733	10.433	12.000	11.833	11.033	68.898	Category:Kacper Garnczarek at 2019 FIG Artistic Gymnastics JWCH on Wikimedia Commons
69	(Chinese Taipei) Ta-Lung Lin	12.366	11.733	11.966	11.466	10.200	11.133	68.864	Category:Ta-Lung Lin at 2019 FIG Artistic Gymnastics JWCH on Wikimedia Commons
70	(Mongolia) Enkhtuvshin Damdindorj	12.266	9.266	11.200	13.100	11.500	11.466	68.798	Category:Enkhtuvshin Damdindorj at 2019 FIG Artistic Gymnastics JWCH on Wikimedia Commons
71	(Serbia) Luka Milojević	11.866	10.866	12.066	11.700	12.141	9.733	68.372	Category:Luka Milojević at 2019 FIG Artistic Gymnastics JWCH on Wikimedia Commons
72	(Ecuador) César López	11.866	10.233	12.133	13.033	9.233	11.866	68.364	Category:César López at 2019 FIG Artistic Gymnastics JWCH on Wikimedia Commons
73	(Azerbaijan) Mansum Safarov	11.933	10.433	11.466	11.266	11.400	11.733	68.231	Category:Mansum Safarov at 2019 FIG Artistic Gymnastics JWCH on Wikimedia Commons
74	(Kazakhstan) Alisher Toibazarov	11.633	10.200	11.633	11.333	11.850	11.566	68.215	Category:Alisher Toibazarov at 2019 FIG Artistic Gymnastics JWCH on Wikimedia Commons
75	(Uzbekistan) Fayoziddin Mamatkulov	11.233	11.366	11.900	12.666	9.900	11.033	68.098	Category:Fayoziddin Mamatkulov at 2019 FIG Artistic Gymnastics JWCH on Wikimedia Commons
76	(Sweden) William Sundell	10.300	12.133	10.766	12.433	11.700	10.600	67.932	Category:William Sundell at 2019 FIG Artistic Gymnastics JWCH on Wikimedia Commons
77	(Mexico) Paulino Razo	12.200	11.000	11.300	11.733	10.966	10.400	67.599	Category:Paulino Razo at 2019 FIG Artistic Gymnastics JWCH on Wikimedia Commons
78	(Austria) Elias Mayer	12.133	8.100	11.866	12.466	11.566	10.733	66.864	Category:Elias Mayer at 2019 FIG Artistic Gymnastics JWCH on Wikimedia Commons
–	(Kazakhstan) Nikolay Makiyev	12.033	9.666	10.533	12.000	11.491	10.900	66.623	Category:Nikolay Makiyev at 2019 FIG Artistic Gymnastics JWCH on Wikimedia Commons
–	(Uzbekistan) Ravshan Kamiljanov	11.466	11.400	10.800	10.200	11.500	11.200	66.566	Category:Ravshan Kamiljanov at 2019 FIG Artistic Gymnastics JWCH on Wikimedia Commons
79	(Peru) Daniel Alarcón	12.066	6.366	12.633	13.500	12.533	8.833	65.931	Category:Daniel Alarcón at 2019 FIG Artistic Gymnastics JWCH on Wikimedia Commons
80	(Czech Republic) Jonáš Běhal	11.366	8.533	11.133	11.033	12.066	11.533	65.664	Category:Jonáš Běhal at 2019 FIG Artistic Gymnastics JWCH on Wikimedia Commons
–	(Czech Republic) Štěpán Vogl	11.433	9.000	11.200	11.800	11.433	10.700	65.566	Category:Štěpán Vogl at 2019 FIG Artistic Gymnastics JWCH on Wikimedia Commons
81	(Cyprus) Georgios Angonas	12.166	5.200	12.266	12.933	10.866	12.133	65.564	Category:Georgios Angonas at 2019 FIG Artistic Gymnastics JWCH on Wikimedia Commons
–	(Chinese Taipei) Tsung-Hua Wu	11.866	8.133	11.566	12.466	10.500	11.033	65.564	Category:Tsung-Hua Wu at 2019 FIG Artistic Gymnastics JWCH on Wikimedia Commons
–	(Sweden) Vilgot Hyll	11.700	11.033	10.766	10.066	11.541	10.300	65.406	Category:Vilgot Hyll at 2019 FIG Artistic Gymnastics JWCH on Wikimedia Commons
–	(New Zealand) Brodyn Hall	12.033	8.500	10.916	11.866	11.200	9.900	64.415	Category:Brodyn Hall at 2019 FIG Artistic Gymnastics JWCH on Wikimedia Commons
–	(Ecuador) Johnny Valencia	11.633	9.800	11.133	11.933	10.033	8.700	63.232	Category:Johnny Valencia at 2019 FIG Artistic Gymnastics JWCH on Wikimedia Commons
–	(Latvia) Ričards Plate	10.633	10.566	11.466	10.066	10.800	9.466	62.997	Category:Ričards Plate at 2019 FIG Artistic Gymnastics JWCH on Wikimedia Commons
82	(Mongolia) Boldbaatar Bayarsaikhan	11.933	7.500	5.933	12.933	12.033	11.833	62.165	Category:Boldbaatar Bayarsaikhan at 2019 FIG Artistic Gymnastics JWCH on Wikimedia Commons
–	(Mongolia) Usukhbayar Erkhembayar	10.900	10.400	5.566	12.500	11.666	10.600	61.632	Category:Usukhbayar Erkhembayar at 2019 FIG Artistic Gymnastics JWCH on Wikimedia Commons
83	(Israel) Eyal Indig	12.366	12.300	11.933	12.433	11.033	1.433	61.498	Category:Eyal Zvi Indig at 2019 FIG Artistic Gymnastics JWCH on Wikimedia Commons
84	(Colombia) Marcos Aguilar	9.733	3.466	11.533	13.000	12.433	9.966	60.131	Category:Marcos Aguilar at 2019 FIG Artistic Gymnastics JWCH on Wikimedia Commons
–	(Mexico) Alejandro Hernández	12.466	0.800	11.200	12.333	11.500	11.733	60.032	Category:Alejandro Hernández at 2019 FIG Artistic Gymnastics JWCH on Wikimedia Commons
85	(Denmark) Sofus Mollgaard	11.300	7.333	7.200	12.733	10.866	10.233	59.665	Category:Sofus Mollgaard at 2019 FIG Artistic Gymnastics JWCH on Wikimedia Commons
86	(Panama) Joseph Putaturo	9.000	8.166	9.833	10.166	9.133	9.533	55.831	Category:Joseph Putaturo at 2019 FIG Artistic Gymnastics JWCH on Wikimedia Commons
87	(Saudi Arabia) Nasser Alsamiri	5.566	5.133	6.833	11.800	10.000	9.433	48.465	Category:Nasser Alsamiri at 2019 FIG Artistic Gymnastics JWCH on Wikimedia Commons
–	(Vietnam) Phạm Phước Hiếu	12.633	8.200	-	-	11.600	11.166	43.599	Category:Phạm Phước Hiếu at 2019 FIG Artistic Gymnastics JWCH on Wikimedia Commons
–	(Iran) Omid Ayenehband	-	-	12.400	13.266	-	11.108	36.774	Category:Omid Ayenehband at 2019 FIG Artistic Gymnastics JWCH on Wikimedia Commons
–	(Belarus) Pavel Yakubau	11.800	5.833	-	12.866	-	-	30.499	Category:Pavel Yakubau at 2019 FIG Artistic Gymnastics JWCH on Wikimedia Commons
88	(Croatia) Mateo Žugec	5.333	12.866	0.000	10.266	0.433	1.083	29.981	Category:Mateo Žugec at 2019 FIG Artistic Gymnastics JWCH/All-around competition on Wikimedia Commons
–	(Syria) Lais Najjar	12.566	-	-	12.866	-	-	25.432	Category:Lais Najjar at 2019 FIG Artistic Gymnastics JWCH on Wikimedia Commons

=== Floor exercise ===
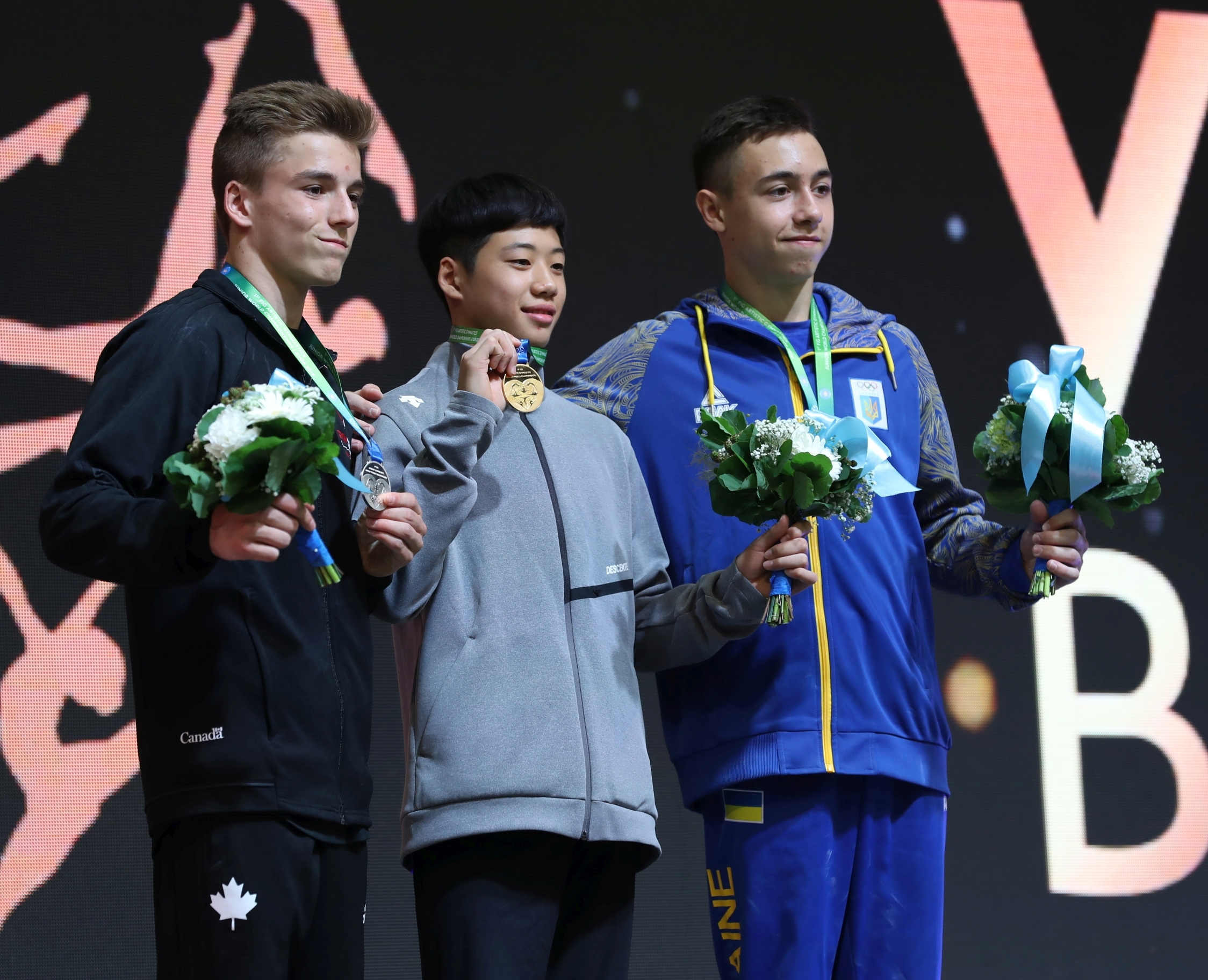
The Medal Ceremony for the Floor Final Ryu Sung-hyun (South Korea) Félix Dolci (Canada) Nazar Chepurnyi (Ukraine)

Oldest and youngest competitors

	Name	Country	Date of birth	Age
Youngest	Ryu Sung-hyun	South Korea	22 October 2002	16 years, 8 months and 7 days
Oldest	Ryosuke Doi	Japan	7 January 2002	17 years, 5 months and 22 days

Rank	Gymnast	D Score	E Score	Pen.	Total	Photos
1st place, gold medalist(s)	(South Korea) Ryu Sung-hyun	5.500	8.666		14.166	Category:Sunghyun Ryu at 2019 FIG Artistic Gymnastics JWCH/Apparatus finals on Wikimedia Commons
2nd place, silver medalist(s)	(Canada) Félix Dolci	5.200	8.800		14.000	Category:Félix Dolci at 2019 FIG Artistic Gymnastics JWCH/Apparatus finals on Wikimedia Commons
3rd place, bronze medalist(s)	(Ukraine) Nazar Chepurnyi	5.200	8.666		13.866	Category:Nazar Chepurnyi at 2019 FIG Artistic Gymnastics JWCH/Apparatus finals on Wikimedia Commons
4	(Japan) Ryosuke Doi	5.400	8.400		13.800	Category:Ryosuke Doi at 2019 FIG Artistic Gymnastics JWCH/Apparatus finals on Wikimedia Commons
5	(Italy) Lorenzo Minh Casali	5.100	8.500		13.600	Category:Lorenzo Minh Casali at 2019 FIG Artistic Gymnastics JWCH/Apparatus finals on Wikimedia Commons
6	(United States) Matthew Cormier	5.000	8.566		13.566	Category:Matthew Cormier at 2019 FIG Artistic Gymnastics JWCH/Apparatus finals on Wikimedia Commons
7	(Japan) Takeru Kitazono	5.000	8.333		13.333	Category:Takeru Kitazono at 2019 FIG Artistic Gymnastics JWCH/Apparatus finals on Wikimedia Commons
8	(United Kingdom) Sam Mostowfi	5.000	8.566	0.300	13.266	Category:Sam Mostowfi at 2019 FIG Artistic Gymnastics JWCH/Apparatus finals on Wikimedia Commons

=== Pommel horse ===
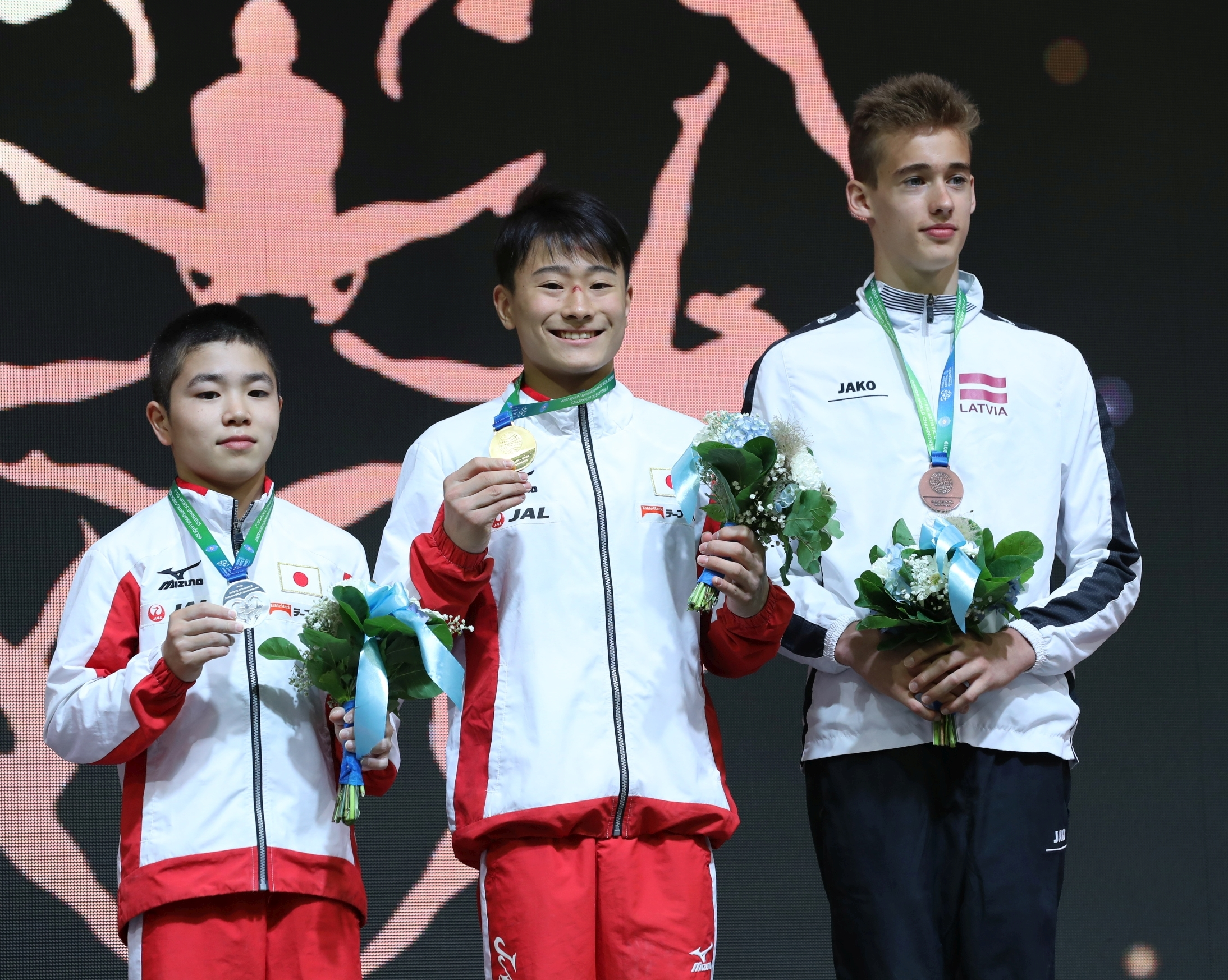
The Medal Ceremony for the Pommel horse Final Takeru Kitazono (Japan) Shinnosuke Oka (Japan) Edvins Rodevics (Latvia)

Oldest and youngest competitors

	Name	Country	Date of birth	Age
Youngest	Shinnosuke Oka	Japan	31 October 2003	15 years, 7 months and 29 days
Oldest	Mateo Žugec	Croatia	2 February 2002	17 years, 4 months and 27 days

Rank	Gymnast	D Score	E Score	Pen.	Total	Photos
1st place, gold medalist(s)	(Japan) Takeru Kitazono	5.200	8.766		13.966	Category:Takeru Kitazono at 2019 FIG Artistic Gymnastics JWCH/Apparatus finals on Wikimedia Commons
2nd place, silver medalist(s)	(Japan) Shinnosuke Oka	5.000	8.766		13.766	Category:Shinnosuke Oka at 2019 FIG Artistic Gymnastics JWCH/Apparatus finals on Wikimedia Commons
3rd place, bronze medalist(s)	(Latvia) Edvīns Rodevičs	4.700	8.533		13.233	Category:Edvins Rodevics at 2019 FIG Artistic Gymnastics JWCH/Apparatus finals on Wikimedia Commons
4	(Armenia) Gagik Khachikyan	4.900	8.133		13.033	Category:Gagik Khachikyan at 2019 FIG Artistic Gymnastics JWCH/Apparatus finals on Wikimedia Commons
5	(Croatia) Mateo Žugec	4.500	8.500		13.000	Category:Mateo Žugec at 2019 FIG Artistic Gymnastics JWCH/Apparatus finals on Wikimedia Commons
6	(Ukraine) Illia Kovtun	5.500	6.300		11.800	Category:Illia Kovtun at 2019 FIG Artistic Gymnastics JWCH/Apparatus finals on Wikimedia Commons
7	(Azerbaijan) Samad Mammadli	5.000	6.000		11.000	Category:Samad Mammadli at 2019 FIG Artistic Gymnastics JWCH/Apparatus finals on Wikimedia Commons
8	(China) Yang Haonan	3.400	6.633		10.033	Category:Haonan Yang at 2019 FIG Artistic Gymnastics JWCH/Apparatus finals on Wikimedia Commons

=== Still rings ===
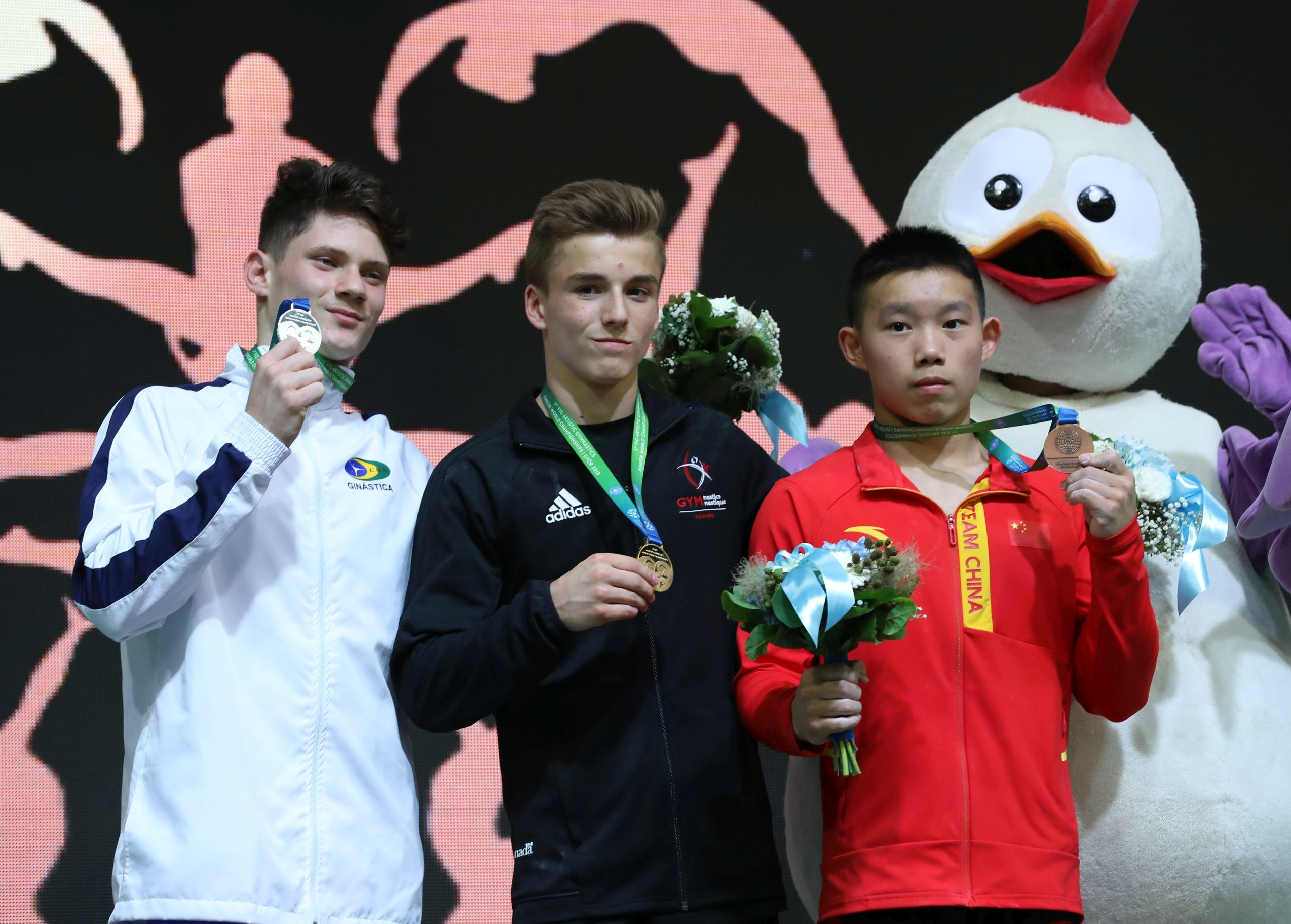
The Medal Ceremony for the Still rings Final Félix Dolci (Canada) Diogo Soares (Brazil) Haonan Yang (China)

Oldest and youngest competitors

	Name	Country	Date of birth	Age
Youngest	Shinnosuke Oka	Japan	31 October 2003	15 years, 7 months and 29 days
Oldest	Ivan Kuliak	Russia	28 February 2002	17 years, 4 months and 1 day

Rank	Gymnast	D Score	E Score	Pen.	Total	Photos
1st place, gold medalist(s)	(Canada) Félix Dolci	4.500	9.100		13.600	Category:Félix Dolci at 2019 FIG Artistic Gymnastics JWCH/Apparatus finals on Wikimedia Commons
2nd place, silver medalist(s)	(Brazil) Diogo Soares	4.500	9.000		13.500	Category:Diogo Soares at 2019 FIG Artistic Gymnastics JWCH/Apparatus finals on Wikimedia Commons
3rd place, bronze medalist(s)	(China) Yang Haonan	4.800	8.675		13.475	Category:Haonan Yang at 2019 FIG Artistic Gymnastics JWCH/Apparatus finals on Wikimedia Commons
4	(United States) Isaiah Drake	4.400	9.000		13.400	Category:Isaiah Drake at 2019 FIG Artistic Gymnastics JWCH/Apparatus finals on Wikimedia Commons
5	(Japan) Shinnosuke Oka	4.600	8.800		13.400	Category:Shinnosuke Oka at 2019 FIG Artistic Gymnastics JWCH/Apparatus finals on Wikimedia Commons
6	(United States) Garrett Braunton	4.400	8.933		13.333	Category:Garrett Braunton at 2019 FIG Artistic Gymnastics JWCH/Apparatus finals on Wikimedia Commons
7	(Russia) Ivan Kuliak	4.500	8.833		13.333	Category:Ivan Kuliak at 2019 FIG Artistic Gymnastics JWCH/Apparatus finals on Wikimedia Commons
8	(China) Yang Yanzhi	4.600	8.400		13.000	Category:Yanzhi Yang at 2019 FIG Artistic Gymnastics JWCH/Apparatus finals on Wikimedia Commons

=== Vault ===
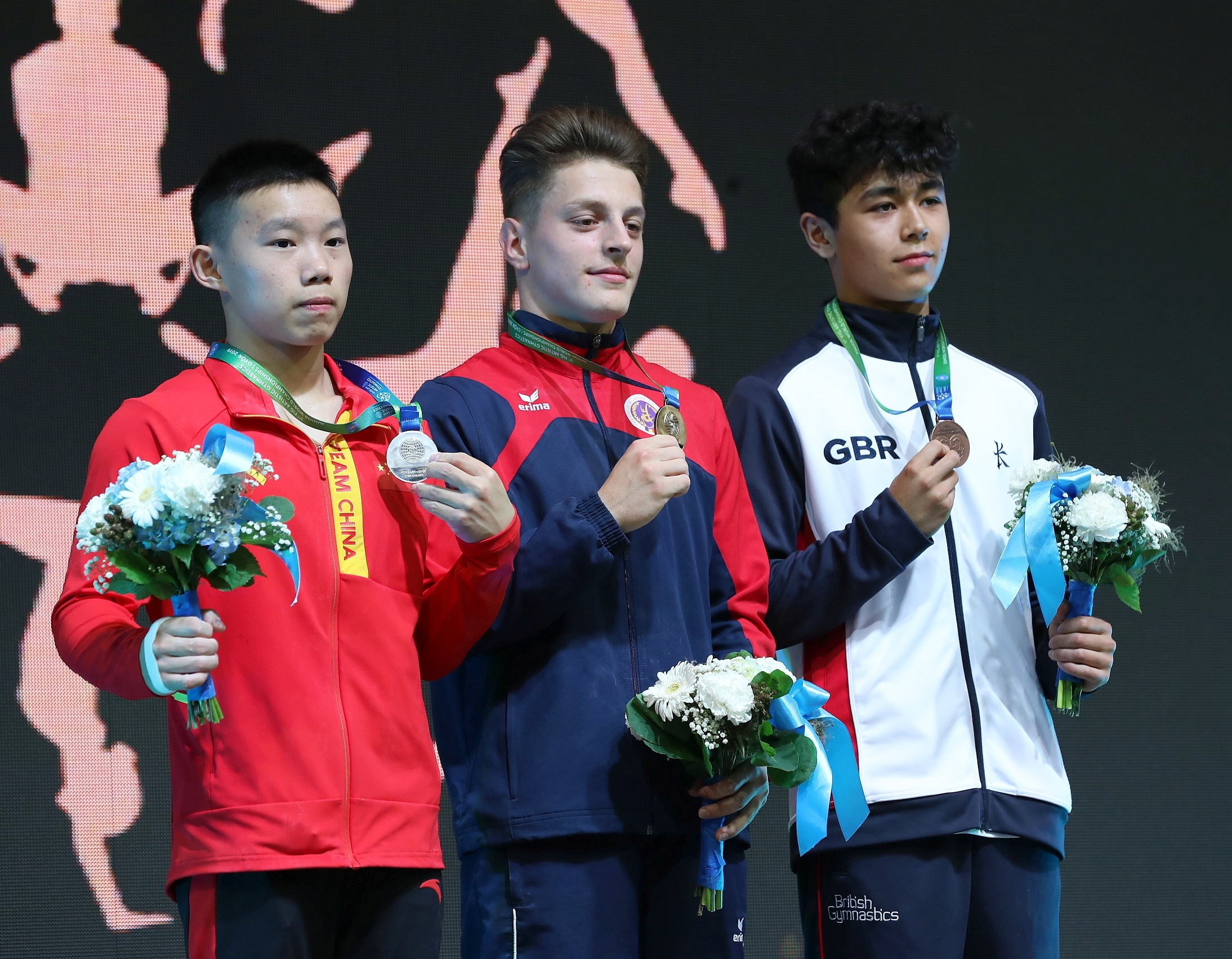
The Medal Ceremony for the Vault Final Gabriel Burtanete (Romania) Yang Haonan (China) Jasper Smith-Gordon (United Kingdom)

Oldest and youngest competitors

	Name	Country	Date of birth	Age
Youngest	James Hardy	Australia	14 March 2003	16 years, 3 months and 16 days
Oldest	Gabriel Burtanete	Romania	19 February 2002	17 years, 4 months and 11 days

Position	Gymnast	Vault 1				Vault 2				Total	Photos
Position	Gymnast	D Score	E Score	Pen.	Score 1	D Score	E Score	Pen.	Score 2	Total	Photos
1st place, gold medalist(s)	(Romania) Gabriel Burtanete	5.200	9.316		14.516	5.200	9.133		14.333	14.424	Category:Gabriel Burtănete at 2019 FIG Artistic Gymnastics JWCH/Apparatus finals on Wikimedia Commons
2nd place, silver medalist(s)	(China) Yang Haonan	5.200	9.300		14.500	4.800	9.300		14.100	14.300	Category:Haonan Yang at 2019 FIG Artistic Gymnastics JWCH/Apparatus finals on Wikimedia Commons
3rd place, bronze medalist(s)	(United Kingdom) Jasper Smith-Gordon	5.200	9.266		14.466	4.800	9.100		13.900	14.183	Category:Jasper Smith-Gordon at 2019 FIG Artistic Gymnastics JWCH/Apparatus finals on Wikimedia Commons
4	(New Zealand) Sam Dick	5.200	8.766		13.966	4.800	9.200		14.000	13.983	Category:Sam Dick at 2019 FIG Artistic Gymnastics JWCH/Apparatus finals on Wikimedia Commons
5	(Brazil) Diogo Soares	4.800	9.133	0.100	13.833	4.400	9.266		13.666	13.749	Category:Diogo Soares at 2019 FIG Artistic Gymnastics JWCH/Apparatus finals on Wikimedia Commons
6	(Brazil) João Viera	4.800	9.366		14.166	5.200	8.066		13.266	13.716	Category:João Vieira at 2019 FIG Artistic Gymnastics JWCH/Apparatus finals on Wikimedia Commons
7	(France) Leo Saladino	5.200	9.066		14.266	5.200	7.800	0.100	12.900	13.583	Category:Leo Saladino at 2019 FIG Artistic Gymnastics JWCH/Apparatus finals on Wikimedia Commons
8	(Australia) James Hardy	5.200	8.000		13.200	4.800	8.700		13.500	13.350	Category:James Hardy at 2019 FIG Artistic Gymnastics JWCH/Apparatus finals on Wikimedia Commons

=== Parallel bars ===
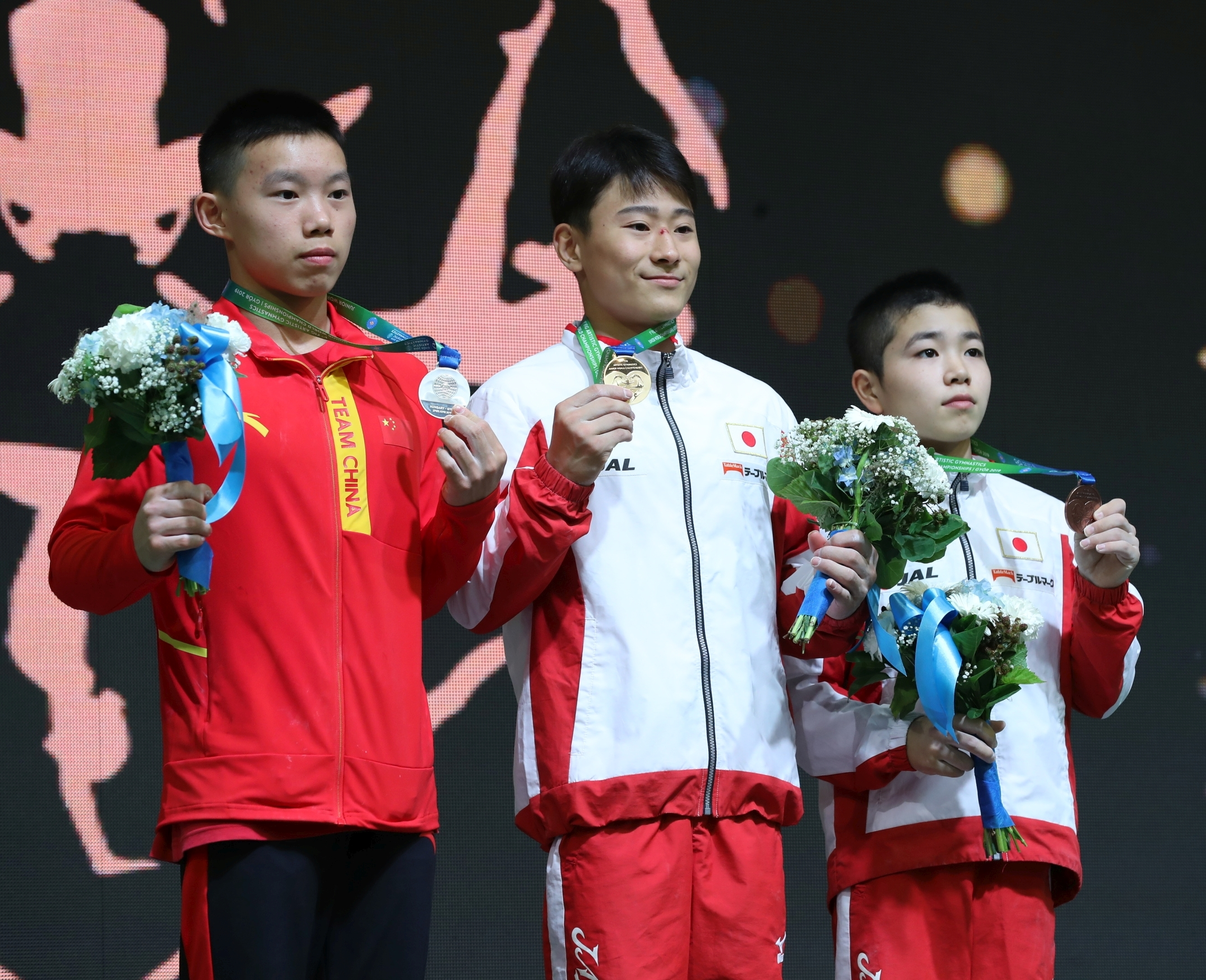
The Medal Ceremony for the Parallel bars Final Takeru Kitazono (Japan) Yang Haonan (China) Shinnosuke Oka (Japan)

Oldest and youngest competitors

	Name	Country	Date of birth	Age
Youngest	Shinnosuke Oka	Japan	31 October 2003	15 years, 7 months and 30 days
Oldest	Krisztián Balázs	Hungary	25 March 2002	17 years, 3 months and 5 days

Rank	Gymnast	D Score	E Score	Pen.	Total	Photos
1st place, gold medalist(s)	(Japan) Takeru Kitazono	5.700	8.566		14.266	Category:Takeru Kitazono at 2019 FIG Artistic Gymnastics JWCH/Apparatus finals on Wikimedia Commons
2nd place, silver medalist(s)	(China) Yang Haonan	5.300	8.600		13.900	Category:Haonan Yang at 2019 FIG Artistic Gymnastics JWCH/Apparatus finals on Wikimedia Commons
3rd place, bronze medalist(s)	(Japan) Shinnosuke Oka	5.100	8.666		13.766	Category:Shinnosuke Oka at 2019 FIG Artistic Gymnastics JWCH/Apparatus finals on Wikimedia Commons
4	(Ukraine) Illia Kovtun	5.700	7.766		13.466	Category:Illia Kovtun at 2019 FIG Artistic Gymnastics JWCH/Apparatus finals on Wikimedia Commons
5	(Hungary) Krisztián Balázs	5.000	8.366		13.366	Category:Krisztián Balázs at 2019 FIG Artistic Gymnastics JWCH/Apparatus finals on Wikimedia Commons
6	(China) Li Hongyan	4.400	8.666		13.066	Category:Hongyan Li at 2019 FIG Artistic Gymnastics JWCH/Apparatus finals on Wikimedia Commons
7	(Ukraine) Nazar Chepurnyi	5.100	7.500		12.600	Category:Nazar Chepurnyi at 2019 FIG Artistic Gymnastics JWCH/Apparatus finals on Wikimedia Commons
8	(Turkey) Kerem Şener	4.500	6.866		11.366	Category:Kerem Sener at 2019 FIG Artistic Gymnastics JWCH/Apparatus finals on Wikimedia Commons

=== Horizontal bar ===
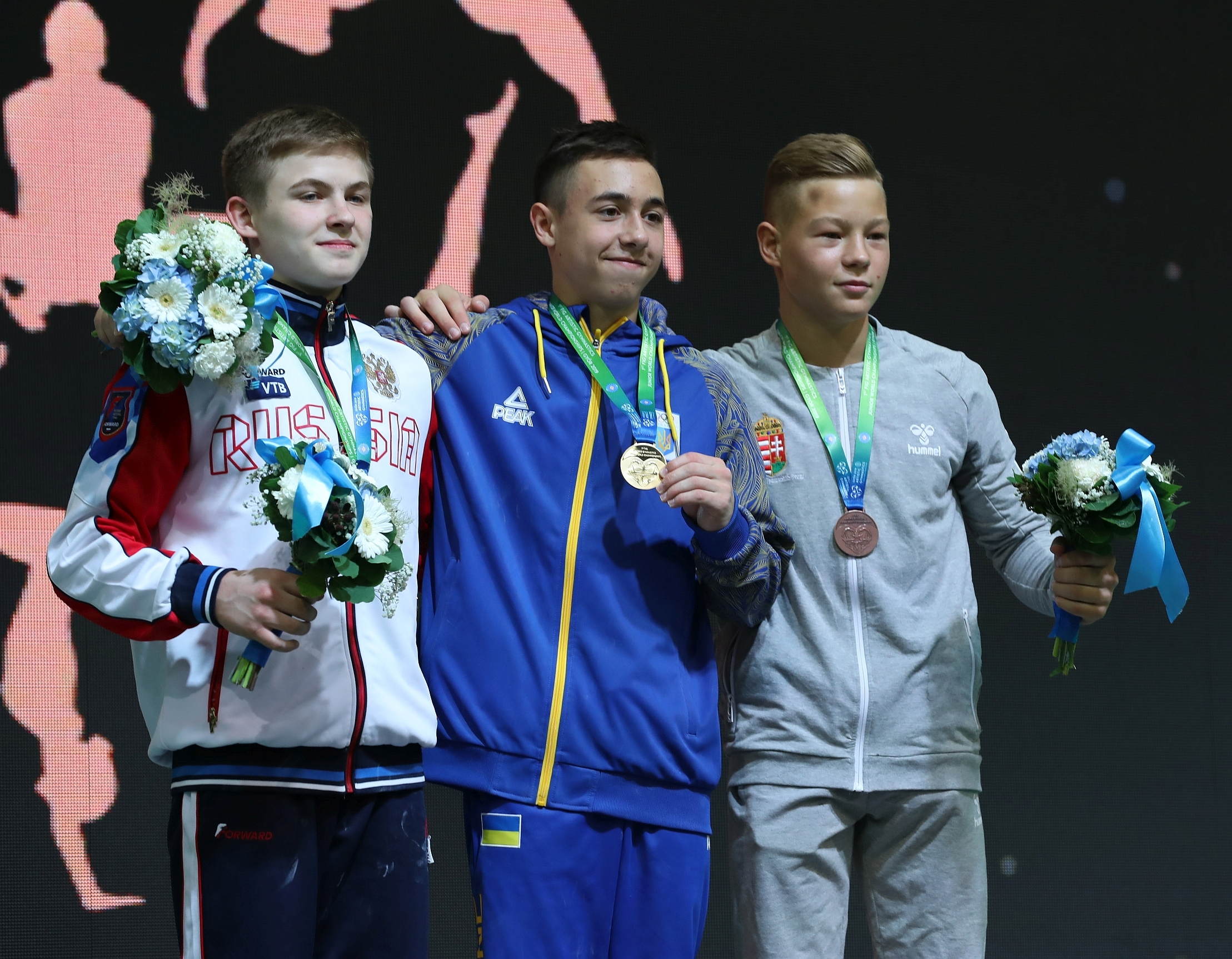
The Medal Ceremony for the Horizontal bar Final Nazar Chepurnyi (Ukraine) Ivan Gerget (Russia) Krisztián Balázs (Hungary)

Oldest and youngest competitors

	Name	Country	Date of birth	Age
Youngest	Arne Nicolai Halbisch	Germany	30 July 2003	15 years and 11 months
Oldest	Ivan Brunello	Italy	28 January 2002	17 years, 5 months and 2 days

Rank	Gymnast	D Score	E Score	Pen.	Total	Photos
1st place, gold medalist(s)	(Ukraine) Nazar Chepurnyi	4.900	8.800		13.700	Category:Nazar Chepurnyi at 2019 FIG Artistic Gymnastics JWCH/Apparatus finals on Wikimedia Commons
2nd place, silver medalist(s)	(Russia) Ivan Gerget	4.700	8.900		13.600	Category:Ivan Gerget at 2019 FIG Artistic Gymnastics JWCH/Apparatus finals on Wikimedia Commons
3rd place, bronze medalist(s)	(Hungary) Krisztián Balázs	4.800	8.600		13.400	Category:Krisztián Balázs at 2019 FIG Artistic Gymnastics JWCH/Apparatus finals on Wikimedia Commons
4	(Italy) Ivan Brunello	4.500	8.891		13.391	Category:Ivan Brunello at 2019 FIG Artistic Gymnastics JWCH/Apparatus finals on Wikimedia Commons
5	(France) Lucas Desanges	4.400	8.933		13.333	Category:Lucas Desanges at 2019 FIG Artistic Gymnastics JWCH/Apparatus finals on Wikimedia Commons
6	(Brazil) Diogo Soares	4.700	8.566		13.266	Category:Diogo Soares at 2019 FIG Artistic Gymnastics JWCH/Apparatus finals on Wikimedia Commons
7	(Australia) Jesse Moore	4.200	8.900		13.100	Category:Jesse Moore at 2019 FIG Artistic Gymnastics JWCH/Apparatus finals on Wikimedia Commons
8	(Germany) Arne Nicolai Halbisch	4.400	8.566		12.966	Category:Arne Nicolai Halbisch at 2019 FIG Artistic Gymnastics JWCH/Apparatus finals on Wikimedia Commons

== Women's results ==
=== Team ===
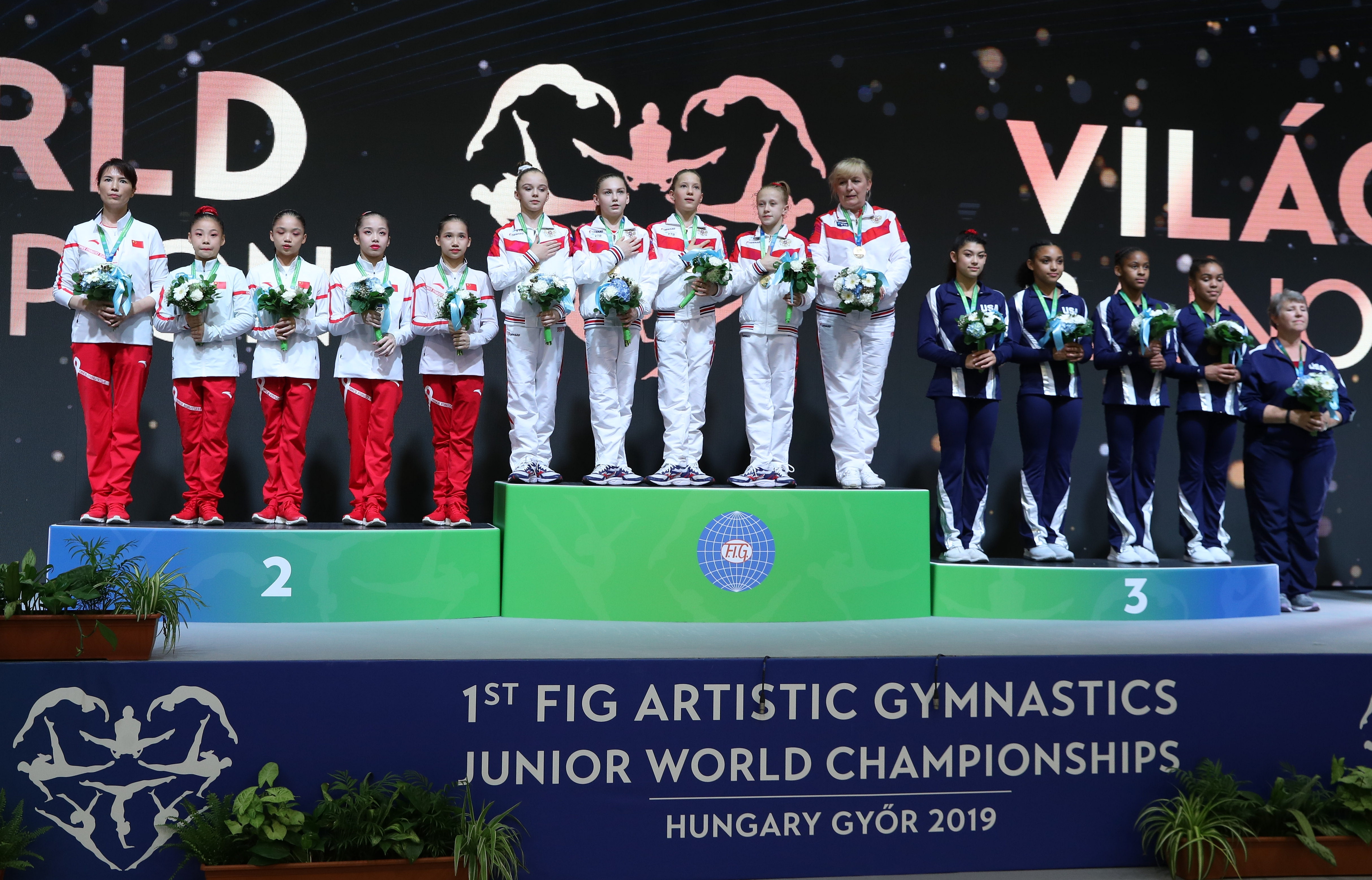
The Medal Ceremony for the Team Final Russia China USA (United States)

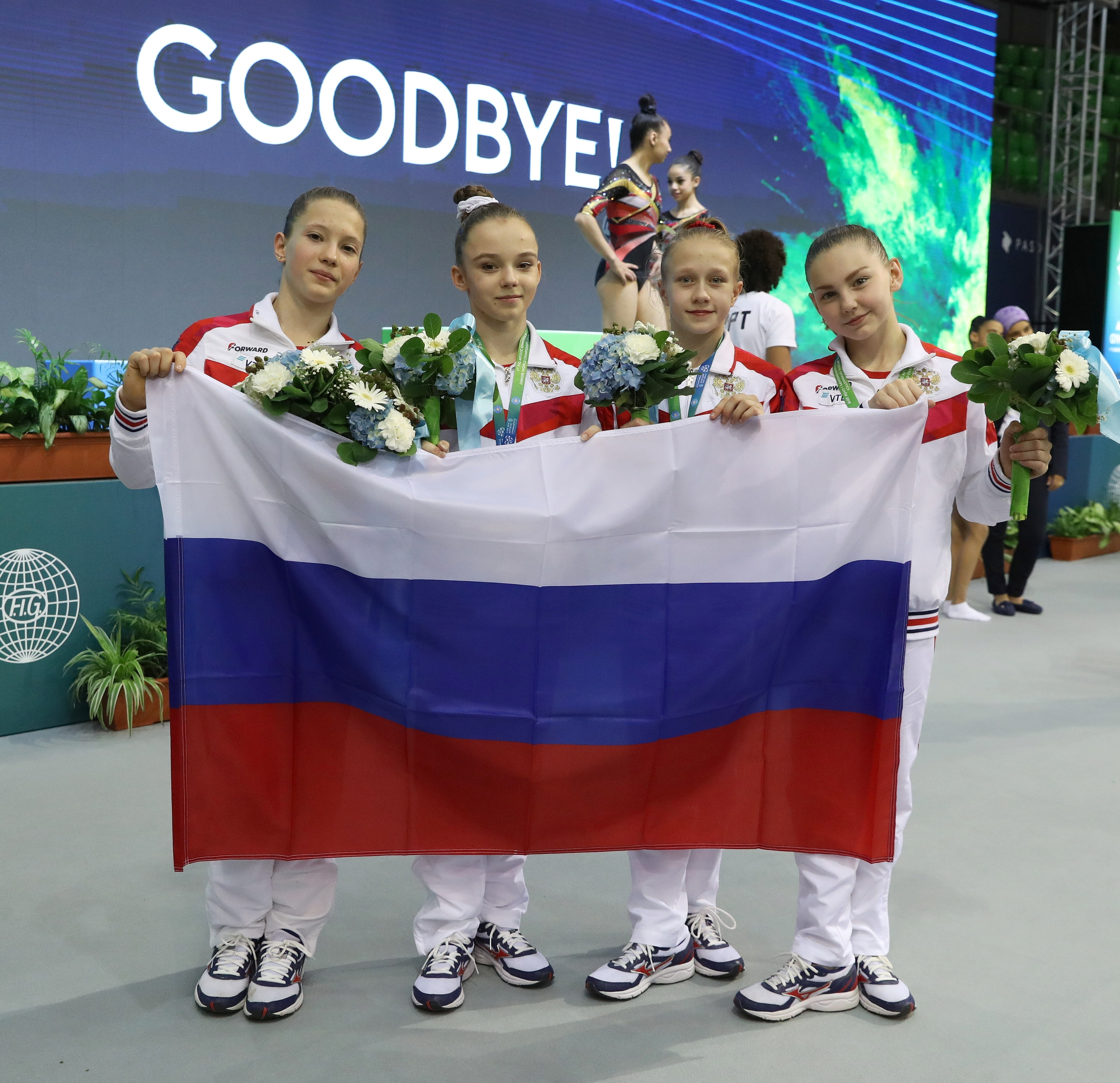
L–R: Team champions Vladislava Urazova, Yana Vorona, Viktoria Listunova, and Elena Gerasimova of Russia

Oldest and youngest competitors

	Name	Country	Date of birth	Age
Youngest	Júlia Soares	Brazil	23 August 2005	13 years, 10 months and 5 days
Oldest	Ou Yushan	China	13 January 2004	15 years, 5 months and 15 days

Rank	Team	Vault (gymnastics)	Uneven bars	Balance beam	Floor (gymnastics)	Total	Photos
1st place, gold medalist(s)	Russia	28.491 (2)	28.362 (1)	26.732 (2)	27.799 (1)	111.654	Category:Russia at 2019 FIG Artistic Gymnastics JWCH on Wikimedia Commons
1st place, gold medalist(s)	Elena Gerasimova	13.233	14.133	13.566	13.633	111.654	Category:Russia at 2019 FIG Artistic Gymnastics JWCH on Wikimedia Commons
1st place, gold medalist(s)	Viktoria Listunova	14.225	14.366	12.566	14.166	111.654	Category:Russia at 2019 FIG Artistic Gymnastics JWCH on Wikimedia Commons
1st place, gold medalist(s)	Vladislava Urazova	14.266	14.266	13.166	13.600	111.654	Category:Russia at 2019 FIG Artistic Gymnastics JWCH on Wikimedia Commons
2nd place, silver medalist(s)	China	27.233 (5)	27.732 (3)	28.066 (1)	26.466 (4)	109.497	Category:China at 2019 FIG Artistic Gymnastics JWCH on Wikimedia Commons
2nd place, silver medalist(s)	Guan Chenchen	14.000	12.816	12.333	12.800	109.497	Category:China at 2019 FIG Artistic Gymnastics JWCH on Wikimedia Commons
2nd place, silver medalist(s)	Ou Yushan	13.233	13.966	14.066	13.666	109.497	Category:China at 2019 FIG Artistic Gymnastics JWCH on Wikimedia Commons
2nd place, silver medalist(s)	Wei Xiaoyuan	13.200	13.766	14.000	12.100	109.497	Category:China at 2019 FIG Artistic Gymnastics JWCH on Wikimedia Commons
3rd place, bronze medalist(s)	United States	28.708 (1)	27.741 (2)	26.632 (3)	26.599 (3)	109.380	Category:United States at 2019 FIG Artistic Gymnastics JWCH on Wikimedia Commons
3rd place, bronze medalist(s)	Sydney Barros	14.408	13.400	12.966	13.200	109.380	Category:United States at 2019 FIG Artistic Gymnastics JWCH on Wikimedia Commons
3rd place, bronze medalist(s)	Skye Blakely	14.233	13.908	11.933	13.333	109.380	Category:United States at 2019 FIG Artistic Gymnastics JWCH on Wikimedia Commons
3rd place, bronze medalist(s)	Kayla DiCello	14.300	13.833	13.366	13.266	109.380	Category:United States at 2019 FIG Artistic Gymnastics JWCH on Wikimedia Commons
4	Romania	26.766 (8)	25.232 (7)	25.832 (5)	26.766 (2)	104.596	Category:Romania at 2019 FIG Artistic Gymnastics JWCH on Wikimedia Commons
4	Antonia Duță	11.866	12.766	12.200	12.800	104.596	Category:Romania at 2019 FIG Artistic Gymnastics JWCH on Wikimedia Commons
4	Silviana Sfiringu	13.966	10.733	12.366	13.366	104.596	Category:Romania at 2019 FIG Artistic Gymnastics JWCH on Wikimedia Commons
4	Ioana Stănciulescu	12.800	12.466	13.466	13.400	104.596	Category:Romania at 2019 FIG Artistic Gymnastics JWCH on Wikimedia Commons
5	Belgium	26.600 (9)	26.699 (4)	25.466 (8)	25.699 (7)	104.464	Category:Belgium at 2019 FIG Artistic Gymnastics JWCH on Wikimedia Commons
5	Stacy Bertrandt	13.400	13.266	12.900	12.500	104.464	Category:Belgium at 2019 FIG Artistic Gymnastics JWCH on Wikimedia Commons
5	Noémie Louon	13.066	13.433	11.766	12.833	104.464	Category:Belgium at 2019 FIG Artistic Gymnastics JWCH on Wikimedia Commons
5	Lisa Vaelen	13.200	11.933	12.566	12.866	104.464	Category:Belgium at 2019 FIG Artistic Gymnastics JWCH on Wikimedia Commons
6	Great Britain	27.649 (3)	24.500 (9)	25.932 (4)	26.033 (5)	104.114	Category:Great Britain at 2019 FIG Artistic Gymnastics JWCH on Wikimedia Commons
6	Jennifer Gadirova	14.133	12.200	13.166	13.533	104.114	Category:Great Britain at 2019 FIG Artistic Gymnastics JWCH on Wikimedia Commons
6	Jessica Gadirova	13.516	12.300	11.700	12.200	104.114	Category:Great Britain at 2019 FIG Artistic Gymnastics JWCH on Wikimedia Commons
6	Alia Leat	13.333	11.466	12.766	12.500	104.114	Category:Great Britain at 2019 FIG Artistic Gymnastics JWCH on Wikimedia Commons
7	Brazil	26.400 (14)	24.499 (10)	25.566 (6)	25.766 (6)	102.231	Category:Brazil at 2019 FIG Artistic Gymnastics JWCH on Wikimedia Commons
7	Christal Bezerra	13.200	11.833	12.333	12.700	102.231	Category:Brazil at 2019 FIG Artistic Gymnastics JWCH on Wikimedia Commons
7	Ana Luiza Lima	13.200	12.666	12.266	11.833	102.231	Category:Brazil at 2019 FIG Artistic Gymnastics JWCH on Wikimedia Commons
7	Júlia Soares	13.100	10.966	13.233	13.066	102.231	Category:Brazil at 2019 FIG Artistic Gymnastics JWCH on Wikimedia Commons
8	Germany	26.266 (16)	25.799 (5)	25.033 (11)	25.066 (12)	102.164	Category:Germany at 2019 FIG Artistic Gymnastics JWCH on Wikimedia Commons
8	Jasmin Haase	13.200	12.766	11.400	12.433	102.164	Category:Germany at 2019 FIG Artistic Gymnastics JWCH on Wikimedia Commons
8	Emma Leonie Malewski	12.400	13.033	12.200	12.633	102.164	Category:Germany at 2019 FIG Artistic Gymnastics JWCH on Wikimedia Commons
8	Lea Marie Quaas	13.066	12.200	12.833	11.766	102.164	Category:Germany at 2019 FIG Artistic Gymnastics JWCH on Wikimedia Commons

=== Individual all-around ===
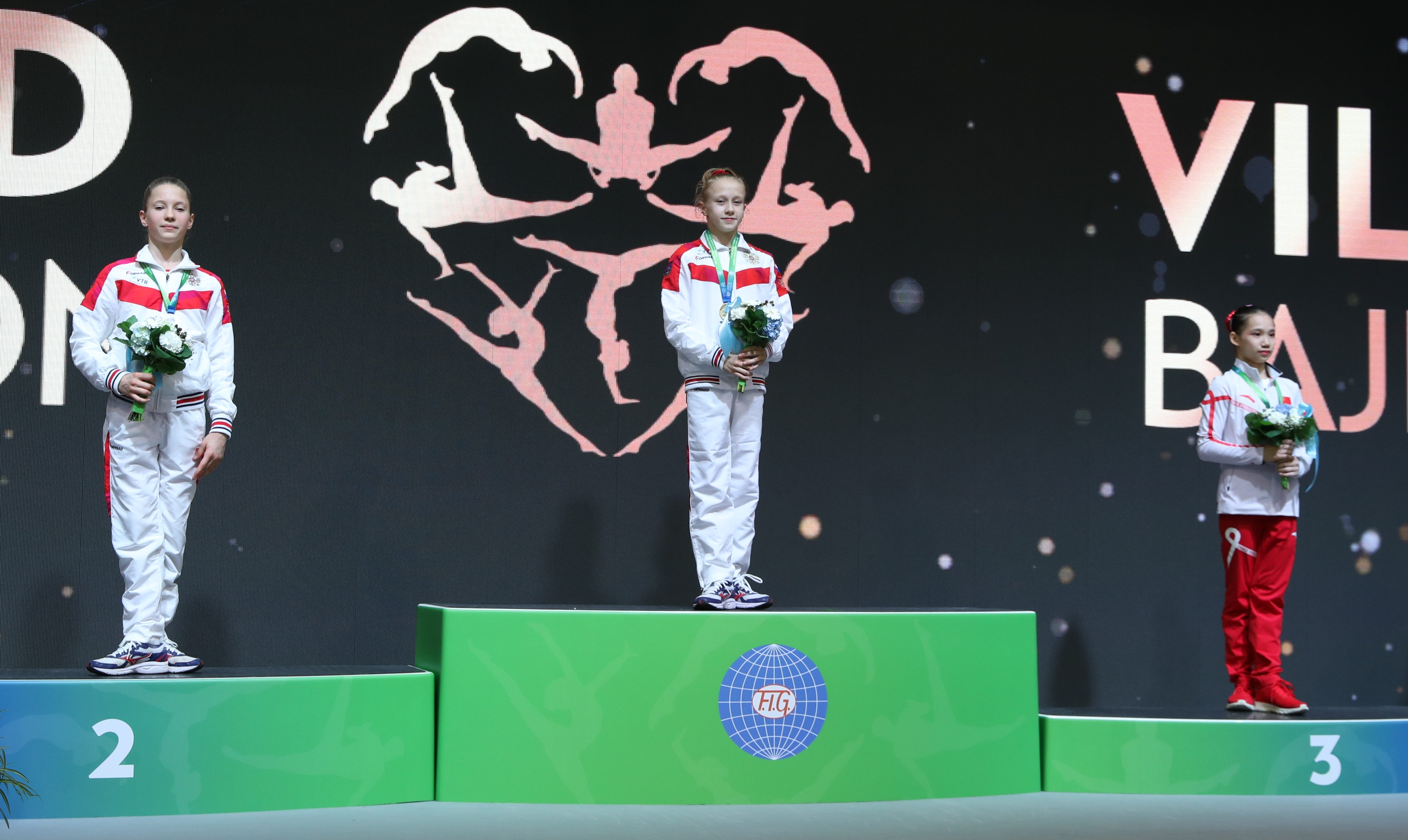
The Medal Ceremony for the Individual All-Around Viktoria Listunova (Russia) Vladislava Urazova (Russia) Ou Yushan (China)

Oldest and youngest competitors

	Name	Country	Date of birth	Age
Youngest	Chiara Vincenzi	Italy	20 October 2005	13 years, 8 months and 8 days
Oldest	Camilla Campagnaro	Italy	6 January 2004	15 years, 5 months and 22 days

Rank	Gymnast	Vault (gymnastics)	Uneven bars	Balance beam	Floor (gymnastics)	Total	Photos
1st place, gold medalist(s)	(Russia) Viktoria Listunova	14.225	14.366	12.566	14.166	55.323	Category:Viktoriia Listunova at 2019 FIG Artistic Gymnastics JWCH/All-around competition on Wikimedia Commons
2nd place, silver medalist(s)	(Russia) Vladislava Urazova	14.266	14.266	13.166	13.600	55.298	Category:Vladislava Urazova at 2019 FIG Artistic Gymnastics JWCH/All-around competition on Wikimedia Commons
3rd place, bronze medalist(s)	(China) Ou Yushan	13.233	13.966	14.066	13.666	54.931	Category:Yushan Ou at 2019 FIG Artistic Gymnastics JWCH/All-around competition on Wikimedia Commons
4	(United States) Kayla DiCello	14.300	13.833	13.366	13.266	54.765	Category:Kayla DiCello at 2019 FIG Artistic Gymnastics JWCH/All-around competition on Wikimedia Commons
–	(Russia) Elena Gerasimova	13.233	14.133	13.566	13.633	54.565	Category:Elena Gerasimova at 2019 FIG Artistic Gymnastics JWCH/All-around competition on Wikimedia Commons
5	(United States) Sydney Barros	14.408	13.400	12.966	13.200	53.974	Category:Sydney Barros at 2019 FIG Artistic Gymnastics JWCH/All-around competition on Wikimedia Commons
–	(United States) Skye Blakely	14.233	13.908	11.933	13.333	53.407	Category:Skye Blakely at 2019 FIG Artistic Gymnastics JWCH/All-around competition on Wikimedia Commons
6	(China) Wei Xiaoyuan	13.200	13.766	14.000	12.100	53.066	Category:Xiaoyuan Wei at 2019 FIG Artistic Gymnastics JWCH/All-around competition on Wikimedia Commons
7	(United Kingdom) Jennifer Gadirova	14.133	12.200	13.166	13.533	53.032	Category:Jennifer Gadirova at 2019 FIG Artistic Gymnastics JWCH/All-around competition on Wikimedia Commons
8	(Romania) Ioana Stănciulescu	12.800	12.466	13.466	13.400	52.132	Category:Ioana Stanciulescu at 2019 FIG Artistic Gymnastics JWCH/All-around competition on Wikimedia Commons
9	(Belgium) Stacy Bertrandt	13.400	13.266	12.900	12.500	52.066	Category:Stacy Bertrandt at 2019 FIG Artistic Gymnastics JWCH/All-around competition on Wikimedia Commons
–	(China) Guan Chenchen	14.000	12.816	12.333	12.800	51.949	Category:Chenchen Guan at 2019 FIG Artistic Gymnastics JWCH/All-around competition on Wikimedia Commons
10	(South Korea) Lee Da-yeong	13.000	12.933	13.066	12.100	51.099	Category:Dayeong Lee at 2019 FIG Artistic Gymnastics JWCH on Wikimedia Commons
11	(Belgium) Noémie Louon	13.066	13.433	11.766	12.833	51.098	Category:Noémie Louon at 2019 FIG Artistic Gymnastics JWCH/All-around competition on Wikimedia Commons
12	(Italy) Chiara Vincenzi	13.400	12.533	12.466	12.666	51.065	Category:Chiara Vincenzi at 2019 FIG Artistic Gymnastics JWCH on Wikimedia Commons
–	(Belgium) Lisa Vaelen	13.200	11.933	12.566	12.866	50.565	Category:Lisa Vaelen at 2019 FIG Artistic Gymnastics JWCH on Wikimedia Commons
13	(Italy) Camilla Campagnaro	13.733	12.333	12.266	12.133	50.465	Category:Camilla Campagnaro at 2019 FIG Artistic Gymnastics JWCH on Wikimedia Commons
14	(Romania) Silviana Sfiringu	13.966	10.733	12.366	13.366	50.431	Category:Silviana Sfiringu at 2019 FIG Artistic Gymnastics JWCH/All-around competition on Wikimedia Commons
15	(Brazil) Júlia Soares	13.100	10.966	13.233	13.066	50.365	Category:Julia Soares at 2019 FIG Artistic Gymnastics JWCH/All-around competition on Wikimedia Commons
16	(Germany) Emma Leonie Malewski	12.400	13.033	12.200	12.633	50.266	Category:Emma Leonie Malewski at 2019 FIG Artistic Gymnastics JWCH on Wikimedia Commons
–	(Italy) Micol Minotti	13.366	12.266	11.933	12.700	50.265	Category:Micol Minotti at 2019 FIG Artistic Gymnastics JWCH on Wikimedia Commons
17	(Hungary) Mirtill Makovits	12.766	12.500	12.400	12.500	50.166	Category:Mirtill Makovits at 2019 FIG Artistic Gymnastics JWCH on Wikimedia Commons
18	(Japan) Shoko Miyata	13.866	12.566	11.433	12.300	50.165	Category:Shoko Miyata at 2019 FIG Artistic Gymnastics JWCH on Wikimedia Commons
19	(Japan) Chiaki Hatakeda	13.633	11.333	12.800	12.333	50.099	Category:Chiaki Hatakeda at 2019 FIG Artistic Gymnastics JWCH on Wikimedia Commons
20	(Brazil) Christal Bezerra	13.200	11.833	12.333	12.700	50.066	Category:Christal Bezerra at 2019 FIG Artistic Gymnastics JWCH on Wikimedia Commons
21	(United Kingdom) Alia Neve Leat	13.333	11.466	12.766	12.500	50.065	Category:Alia Neve Leat at 2019 FIG Artistic Gymnastics JWCH on Wikimedia Commons
22	(Canada) Cassandra Lee	12.766	12.033	12.833	12.433	50.065	Category:Cassandra Lee at 2019 FIG Artistic Gymnastics JWCH on Wikimedia Commons
23	(Canada) Clara Raposo	13.133	11.533	12.666	12.666	49.998	Category:Clara Raposo at 2019 FIG Artistic Gymnastics JWCH on Wikimedia Commons
–	(Brazil) Ana Luiza Lima	13.200	12.666	12.266	11.833	49.965	Category:Ana Luiza Lima at 2019 FIG Artistic Gymnastics JWCH on Wikimedia Commons
24	(Germany) Lea Marie Quaas	13.066	12.200	12.833	11.766	49.865	Category:Lea Marie Quaas at 2019 FIG Artistic Gymnastics JWCH on Wikimedia Commons
–	(Germany) Jasmin Haase	13.200	12.766	11.400	12.433	49.799	Category:Jasmin Haase at 2019 FIG Artistic Gymnastics JWCH on Wikimedia Commons
25	(Sweden) Jennifer Williams	12.466	12.200	12.766	12.300	49.732	Category:Jennifer Williams at 2019 FIG Artistic Gymnastics JWCH on Wikimedia Commons
–	(United Kingdom) Jessica Gadirova	13.516	12.300	11.700	12.200	49.716	Category:Jessica Gadirova at 2019 FIG Artistic Gymnastics JWCH on Wikimedia Commons
–	(Romania) Antonia Duță	11.866	12.766	12.200	12.800	49.632	Category:Antonia Duță at 2019 FIG Artistic Gymnastics JWCH on Wikimedia Commons
26	(Australia) Tiana Odessa	13.266	12.200	11.533	12.600	49.599	Category:Tiana Odessa at 2019 FIG Artistic Gymnastics JWCH on Wikimedia Commons
27	(Ukraine) Daria Murzhak	12.700	12.533	12.200	12.000	49.433	Category:Daria Murzhak at 2019 FIG Artistic Gymnastics JWCH on Wikimedia Commons
28	(Greece) Magdalini Tsiori	13.333	11.633	12.000	12.466	49.432	Category:Magdalini Tsiori at 2019 FIG Artistic Gymnastics JWCH on Wikimedia Commons
29	(South Korea) Solyi Shin	13.200	12.800	11.233	12.066	49.299	Category:Solyi Shin at 2019 FIG Artistic Gymnastics JWCH on Wikimedia Commons
30	(France) Maewenn Eugene	13.366	11.200	12.033	12.666	49.265	Category:Maewenn Eugene at 2019 FIG Artistic Gymnastics JWCH on Wikimedia Commons
31	(Australia) Chloe Trisic	12.466	11.866	12.500	12.433	49.265	Category:Chloe Trisic at 2019 FIG Artistic Gymnastics JWCH on Wikimedia Commons
32	(France) Taïs Boura	13.200	10.266	12.966	12.700	49.132	Category:Taïs Boura at 2019 FIG Artistic Gymnastics JWCH on Wikimedia Commons
33	(Uzbekistan) Anastasiya Miroshnichenko	13.000	11.100	12.333	12.500	48.933	Category:Anastasiya Miroshnichenko at 2019 FIG Artistic Gymnastics JWCH on Wikimedia Commons
34	(Uzbekistan) Dildora Aripova	12.766	11.933	11.500	12.666	48.865	Category:Dildora Aripova at 2019 FIG Artistic Gymnastics JWCH on Wikimedia Commons
35	(Ukraine) Anastasiia Motak	14.141	10.733	11.566	12.366	48.806	Category:Anastasiia Motak at 2019 FIG Artistic Gymnastics JWCH/All-around competition on Wikimedia Commons
36	(Denmark) Camille Rasmussen	13.166	11.466	12.000	12.033	48.665	Category:Camille Rasmussen at 2019 FIG Artistic Gymnastics JWCH on Wikimedia Commons
37	(Spain) Berta Pujadas	13.133	11.700	11.700	11.866	48.399	Category:Berta Pujadas at 2019 FIG Artistic Gymnastics JWCH on Wikimedia Commons
38	(Argentina) Rocio Saucedo	13.233	11.608	11.100	12.266	48.207	Category:Rocio Saucedo at 2019 FIG Artistic Gymnastics JWCH on Wikimedia Commons
–	(Japan) Hazuki Watanabe	13.366	9.733	12.633	12.466	48.198	Category:Hazuki Watanabe at 2019 FIG Artistic Gymnastics JWCH on Wikimedia Commons
39	(Finland) Maisa Kuusikko	13.466	12.066	11.800	10.833	48.165	Category:Maisa Kuusikko at 2019 FIG Artistic Gymnastics JWCH on Wikimedia Commons
40	(Turkey) Bilge Tarhan	13.166	10.833	12.633	11.500	48.132	Category:Bilge Tarhan at 2019 FIG Artistic Gymnastics JWCH on Wikimedia Commons
41	(Norway) Julie Madsoe	12.666	11.500	11.933	12.000	48.099	Category:Julie Madsoe at 2019 FIG Artistic Gymnastics JWCH on Wikimedia Commons
–	(Ukraine) Yelyzaveta Hubareva	13.033	10.766	12.666	11.600	48.065	Category:Yelyzaveta Hubareva at 2019 FIG Artistic Gymnastics JWCH on Wikimedia Commons
42	(Hungary) Hanna Szujó	13.033	11.033	11.600	12.266	47.932	Category:Hanna Szujo at 2019 FIG Artistic Gymnastics JWCH on Wikimedia Commons
43	(Turkey) Dilara Yurtdaş	12.800	11.566	11.000	12.533	47.899	Category:Dilara Yurtdaş at 2019 FIG Artistic Gymnastics JWCH on Wikimedia Commons
44	(Panama) Hillary Heron	13.633	11.200	11.566	11.400	47.799	Category:Hillary Heron at 2019 FIG Artistic Gymnastics JWCH on Wikimedia Commons
–	(France) Alison Faure	12.800	10.766	11.800	12.366	47.732	Category:Alison Faure at 2019 FIG Artistic Gymnastics JWCH on Wikimedia Commons
–	(Australia) Lucy Stewart	12.100	11.233	12.366	12.033	47.732	Category:Lucy Stewart at 2019 FIG Artistic Gymnastics JWCH on Wikimedia Commons
45	(Poland) Dagmara Pyzio	13.166	10.333	12.066	11.866	47.431	Category:Dagmara Pyzio at 2019 FIG Artistic Gymnastics JWCH on Wikimedia Commons
46	(Mexico) Marisa Miranda	12.100	11.300	11.500	12.433	47.333	Category:Marisa Miranda at 2019 FIG Artistic Gymnastics JWCH on Wikimedia Commons
47	(Panama) Karla Navas	12.966	10.933	11.466	11.866	47.231	Category:Karla Navas at 2019 FIG Artistic Gymnastics JWCH on Wikimedia Commons
48	(Ecuador) Alaís Perea	12.700	10.766	11.733	11.966	47.165	Category:Alais Perea at 2019 FIG Artistic Gymnastics JWCH on Wikimedia Commons
49	(Spain) Clara Navarro	12.633	11.500	11.400	11.600	47.133	Category:Clara Navarro at 2019 FIG Artistic Gymnastics JWCH on Wikimedia Commons
50	(Egypt) Salma Melige	12.466	11.966	10.866	11.833	47.131	Category:Salma Melige at 2019 FIG Artistic Gymnastics JWCH on Wikimedia Commons
–	(South Korea) Jinju Hyun	13.300	9.466	12.200	12.100	47.066	Category:Jinju Hyun at 2019 FIG Artistic Gymnastics JWCH on Wikimedia Commons
–	(Canada) Okeri Katjivari	12.833	11.266	11.166	11.766	47.031	Category:Okeri Katjivari at 2019 FIG Artistic Gymnastics JWCH on Wikimedia Commons
–	(Spain) Claudia Villalba	13.266	11.833	10.566	11.233	46.898	Category:Claudia Villalba at 2019 FIG Artistic Gymnastics JWCH on Wikimedia Commons
51	(Egypt) Jana Mahmoud	12.766	10.600	11.066	12.166	46.598	Category:Jana Mahmoud at 2019 FIG Artistic Gymnastics JWCH on Wikimedia Commons
52	(Argentina) Brisa Carraro	13.266	12.133	10.900	10.200	46.499	Category:Brisa Carraro at 2019 FIG Artistic Gymnastics JWCH on Wikimedia Commons
53	(Greece) Chrysa Balami	12.000	10.133	11.766	12.333	46.232	Category:Chrysa Balami at 2019 FIG Artistic Gymnastics JWCH on Wikimedia Commons
54	(Chinese Taipei) Tzu-Hsing Huang	13.000	11.066	10.233	11.866	46.165	Category:Tzu-Hsing Huang at 2019 FIG Artistic Gymnastics JWCH on Wikimedia Commons
–	(Hungary) Nikolett Szilágyi	11.700	10.233	12.000	12.200	46.133	Category:Nikolett Szilagyi at 2019 FIG Artistic Gymnastics JWCH on Wikimedia Commons
55	(Belarus) Tatiana Levchuk	11.500	12.333	9.800	12.466	46.099	Category:Tatiana Levchuk at 2019 FIG Artistic Gymnastics JWCH on Wikimedia Commons
56	(Cyprus) Artemis Georgiou	12.300	10.700	11.300	11.733	46.033	Category:Artemis Georgiou at 2019 FIG Artistic Gymnastics JWCH on Wikimedia Commons
57	(Mexico) Karla Rivera	12.833	11.266	9.866	12.000	45.965	Category:Karla Rivera at 2019 FIG Artistic Gymnastics JWCH on Wikimedia Commons
58	(Portugal) Francisca Cancela	12.766	11.500	9.700	11.666	45.632	Category:Francisca Cancela at 2019 FIG Artistic Gymnastics JWCH on Wikimedia Commons
59	(Guatemala) Daniela Dorigoni	13.033	9.633	10.800	12.033	45.499	Category:Daniela Dorigoni at 2019 FIG Artistic Gymnastics JWCH on Wikimedia Commons
60	(Azerbaijan) Milana Minakovskaya	12.466	10.500	10.433	12.066	45.465	Category:Milana Minakovskaya at 2019 FIG Artistic Gymnastics JWCH on Wikimedia Commons
61	(Czech Republic) Lucie Trnkova	12.100	9.900	11.666	11.666	45.332	Category:Lucie Trnkova at 2019 FIG Artistic Gymnastics JWCH on Wikimedia Commons
62	(Kazakhstan) Darya Yassinskaya	13.300	9.066	11.100	11.833	45.299	Category:Darya Yassinskaya at 2019 FIG Artistic Gymnastics JWCH on Wikimedia Commons
63	(Kazakhstan) Alexandra Shametko	12.533	10.666	11.000	11.000	45.199	Category:Alexandra Shametko at 2019 FIG Artistic Gymnastics JWCH on Wikimedia Commons
–	(Egypt) Jana Aboelhasan	12.600	10.900	9.333	12.000	44.833	Category:Jana Aboelhasan at 2019 FIG Artistic Gymnastics JWCH on Wikimedia Commons
–	(Argentina) Aimara Gómez	11.166	11.433	10.133	12.000	44.732	Category:Aimara Gómez at 2019 FIG Artistic Gymnastics JWCH on Wikimedia Commons
64	(Finland) Malla Montell	11.866	9.658	11.333	11.433	44.290	Category:Malla Montell at 2019 FIG Artistic Gymnastics JWCH on Wikimedia Commons
65	(Portugal) Lia Sobral	11.933	9.666	10.833	11.766	44.198	Category:Lia Sobral at 2019 FIG Artistic Gymnastics JWCH on Wikimedia Commons
–	(Mexico) Greys Nieves	12.966	8.333	11.100	11.666	44.065	Category:Greys Nieves at 2019 FIG Artistic Gymnastics JWCH on Wikimedia Commons
–	(Portugal) Maria Mendes	12.000	9.666	10.233	12.100	43.999	Category:Maria Mendes at 2019 FIG Artistic Gymnastics JWCH on Wikimedia Commons
66	(Slovenia) Zala Bedenik	12.500	9.600	10.166	11.633	43.899	Category:Zala Bedenik at 2019 FIG Artistic Gymnastics JWCH on Wikimedia Commons
–	(Uzbekistan) Anna Silnova	12.533	9.633	10.000	11.500	43.666	Category:Anna Silnova at 2019 FIG Artistic Gymnastics JWCH on Wikimedia Commons
67	(Bulgaria) Elizabet Nikolova	12.233	9.491	10.433	11.366	43.523	Category:Elizabet Nikolova at 2019 FIG Artistic Gymnastics JWCH on Wikimedia Commons
–	(Kazakhstan) Medina Kenenbay	12.133	9.100	11.266	11.000	43.499	Category:Medina Kenenbay at 2019 FIG Artistic Gymnastics JWCH on Wikimedia Commons
–	(Turkey) Ceren Biner	12.833	10.466	10.633	9.433	43.365	Category:Ceren Biner at 2019 FIG Artistic Gymnastics JWCH on Wikimedia Commons
–	(Greece) Asimina Sevastopoulou	11.466	10.800	9.500	11.400	43.166	Category:Asimina Sevastopoulou at 2019 FIG Artistic Gymnastics JWCH on Wikimedia Commons
68	(Singapore) Kaitlyn Lim	11.933	8.033	11.933	10.866	42.765	Category:Kaitlyn Lim at 2019 FIG Artistic Gymnastics JWCH on Wikimedia Commons
69	(Singapore) Rachel Anne Liew	11.466	9.700	11.033	10.266	42.465	Category:Rachel Anne Liew at 2019 FIG Artistic Gymnastics JWCH on Wikimedia Commons
–	(Singapore) Emma Yap	11.066	9.866	11.400	10.133	42.465	Category:Emma Yap at 2019 FIG Artistic Gymnastics JWCH on Wikimedia Commons
70	(Slovakia) Sara Surmanova	12.300	9.700	10.066	10.266	42.332	Category:Sara Surmanova at 2019 FIG Artistic Gymnastics JWCH on Wikimedia Commons
71	(Colombia) Juliana Ochoa	11.900	9.566	9.866	10.966	42.298	Category:Juliana Ochoa at 2019 FIG Artistic Gymnastics JWCH on Wikimedia Commons
–	(Finland) Ilona Kossila	11.866	9.366	10.533	9.966	41.731	Category:Ilona Kossila at 2019 FIG Artistic Gymnastics JWCH on Wikimedia Commons
72	(Lithuania) Ema Pleskyte	11.766	9.033	10.266	10.400	41.465	Category:Ema Pleskyte at 2019 FIG Artistic Gymnastics JWCH on Wikimedia Commons
73	(Jamaica) Nazstazia Henry	12.433	9.033	8.900	10.866	41.232	Category:Nazstazia Henry at 2019 FIG Artistic Gymnastics JWCH on Wikimedia Commons
74	(Malta) Ella Borg	12.033	7.633	10.000	11.166	40.832	Category:Ella Borg at 2019 FIG Artistic Gymnastics JWCH on Wikimedia Commons
75	(Israel) Maya Oberman-Etzion	12.000	6.700	10.366	11.633	40.699	Category:Maya Oberman-Etzion at 2019 FIG Artistic Gymnastics JWCH on Wikimedia Commons
76	(Peru) Ximena Rengifo	12.200	8.266	9.733	9.700	39.899	Category:Ximena Rengifo at 2019 FIG Artistic Gymnastics JWCH on Wikimedia Commons
77	(Iceland) Laufey Birna Jóhannsdóttir	11.900	8.366	9.233	10.400	39.899	Category:Laufey Birna Johannsdottir at 2019 FIG Artistic Gymnastics JWCH on Wikimedia Commons
78	(Latvia) Maija Ojere	12.066	6.175	10.833	10.233	39.307	Category:Maija Ojere at 2019 FIG Artistic Gymnastics JWCH on Wikimedia Commons
79	(Mongolia) Munkhnaran Enkhtuvshin	12.333	7.233	9.666	10.016	39.248	Category:Munkhnaran Enkhtuvshin at 2019 FIG Artistic Gymnastics JWCH on Wikimedia Commons
–	(Belarus) Anastasiya Ursu	12.666	-	11.033	11.600	35.299	Category:Anastasiya Ursu at 2019 FIG Artistic Gymnastics JWCH on Wikimedia Commons
–	(Belarus) Anastasiya Savitskaya	-	10.000	10.766	11.966	32.732	Category:Anastasiya Savitskaya at 2019 FIG Artistic Gymnastics JWCH on Wikimedia Commons

=== Vault ===
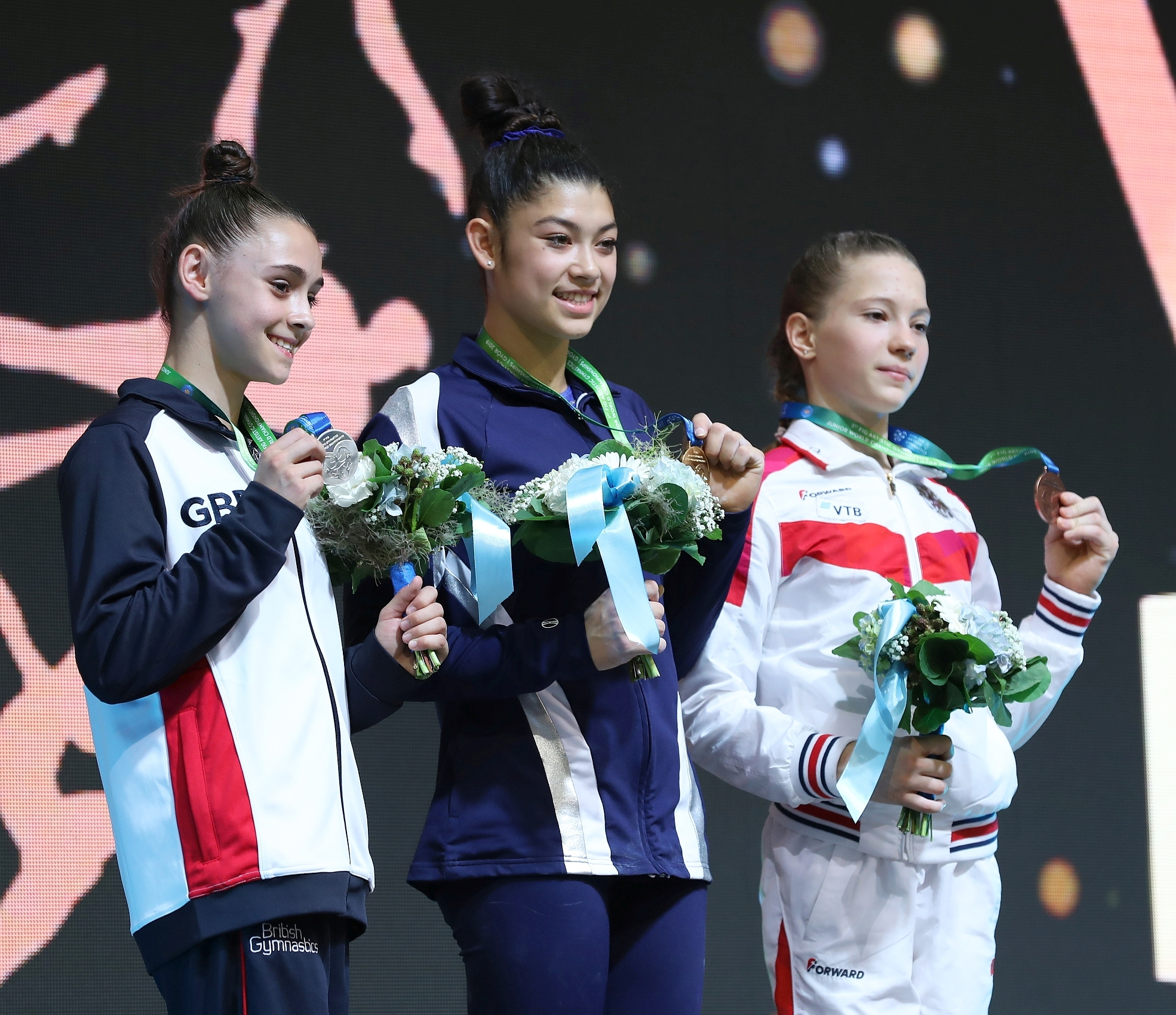
The Medal Ceremony for the Vault Final Kayla DiCello (United States) Jennifer Gadirova (United Kingdom) Vladislava Urazova (Russia)

Oldest and youngest competitors

	Name	Country	Date of birth	Age
Youngest	Viktoria Listunova	Russia	12 May 2005	14 years, 1 month and 17 days
Oldest	Camilla Campagnaro	Italy	6 January 2004	15 years, 5 months and 23 days

Position	Gymnast	Vault 1				Vault 2				Total	Photos
Position	Gymnast	D Score	E Score	Pen.	Score 1	D Score	E Score	Pen.	Score 2	Total	Photos
1st place, gold medalist(s)	(United States) Kayla DiCello	5.400	9.200		14.600	4.600	9.133		13.733	14.166	Category:Kayla DiCello at 2019 FIG Artistic Gymnastics JWCH/Apparatus finals on Wikimedia Commons
2nd place, silver medalist(s)	(United Kingdom) Jennifer Gadirova	5.000	9.333		14.333	4.600	9.333		13.933	14.133	Category:Jennifer Gadirova at 2019 FIG Artistic Gymnastics JWCH/Apparatus finals on Wikimedia Commons
3rd place, bronze medalist(s)	(Russia) Vladislava Urazova	5.400	8.900		14.300	5.000	8.933		13.933	14.116	Category:Vladislava Urazova at 2019 FIG Artistic Gymnastics JWCH/Apparatus finals on Wikimedia Commons
4	(Ukraine) Anastasiia Motak	5.400	8.800		14.200	5.000	8.700		13.700	13.950	Category:Anastasiia Motak at 2019 FIG Artistic Gymnastics JWCH/Apparatus finals on Wikimedia Commons
5	(United States) Sydney Barros	5.400	8.833	0.100	14.133	4.600	9.100		13.700	13.916	Category:Sydney Barros at 2019 FIG Artistic Gymnastics JWCH/Apparatus finals on Wikimedia Commons
6	(China) Guan Chenchen	4.800	8.500	0.100	13.200	5.600	8.566		14.166	13.683	Category:Chenchen Guan at 2019 FIG Artistic Gymnastics JWCH/Apparatus finals on Wikimedia Commons
7	(Italy) Camilla Campagnaro	5.400	8.733		14.133	4.800	8.733	0.300	13.233	13.683	Category:Camilla Campagnaro at 2019 FIG Artistic Gymnastics JWCH/Apparatus finals on Wikimedia Commons
8	(Russia) Viktoria Listunova	5.400	8.566		13.966	4.600	8.733	0.100	13.233	13.599	Category:Viktoriia Listunova at 2019 FIG Artistic Gymnastics JWCH/Apparatus finals on Wikimedia Commons

=== Uneven bars ===
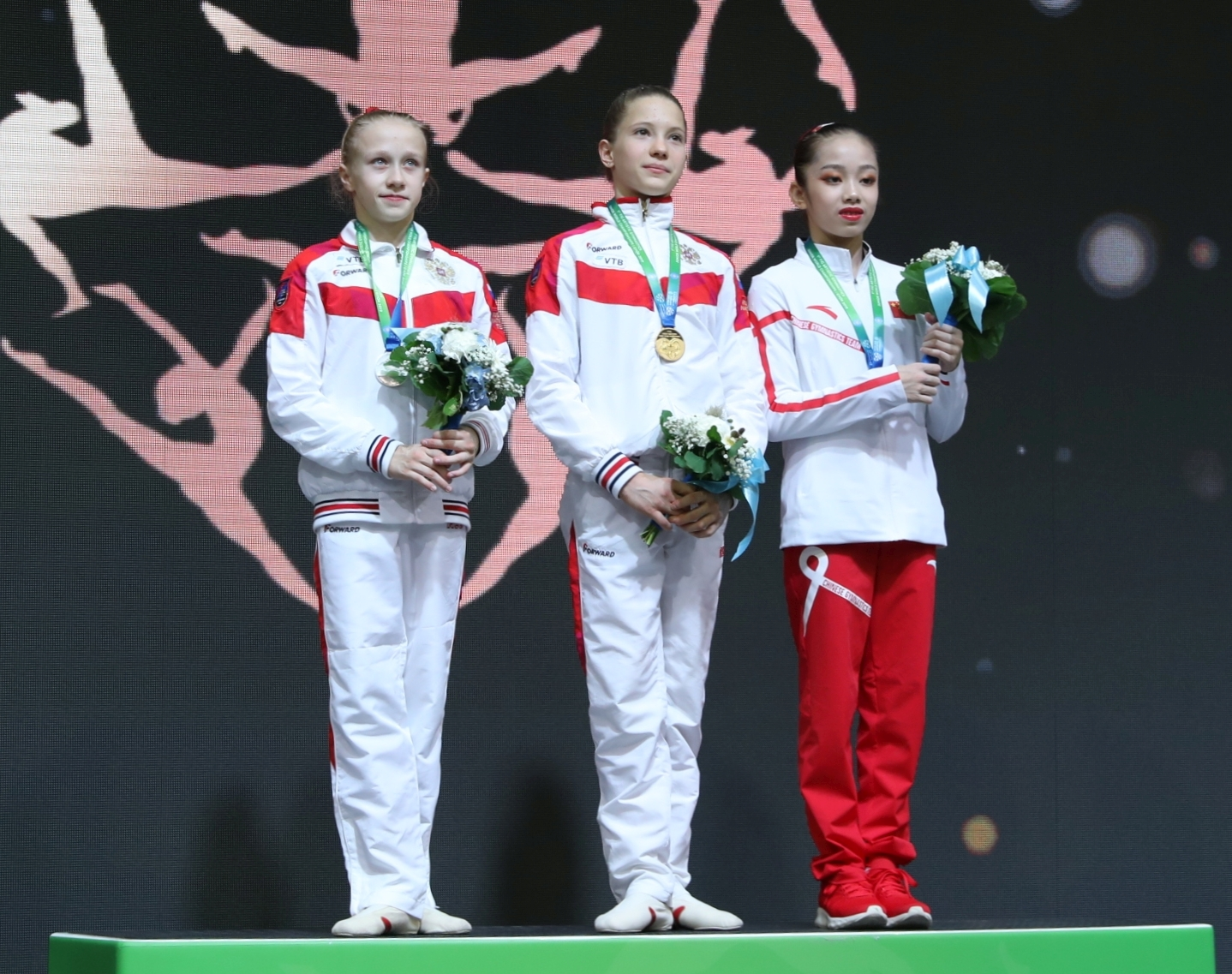
The Medal Ceremony for the Uneven Bars Final Vladislava Urazova (Russia) Viktoria Listunova (Russia) Wei Xiaoyuan (China)

Oldest and youngest competitors

	Name	Country	Date of birth	Age
Youngest	Viktoria Listunova	Russia	12 May 2005	14 years, 1 month and 17 days
Oldest	Ou Yushan	China	13 January 2004	15 years, 5 months and 16 days

Rank	Gymnast	D Score	E Score	Pen.	Total	Photos
1st place, gold medalist(s)	(Russia) Vladislava Urazova	5.900	8.533		14.433	Category:Vladislava Urazova at 2019 FIG Artistic Gymnastics JWCH/Apparatus finals on Wikimedia Commons
2nd place, silver medalist(s)	(Russia) Viktoria Listunova	5.700	8.500		14.200	Category:Viktoriia Listunova at 2019 FIG Artistic Gymnastics JWCH/Apparatus finals on Wikimedia Commons
3rd place, bronze medalist(s)	(China) Wei Xiaoyuan	5.700	8.100		13.800	Category:Xiaoyuan Wei at 2019 FIG Artistic Gymnastics JWCH/Apparatus finals on Wikimedia Commons
4	(United States) Skye Blakely	5.500	8.266		13.766	Category:Skye Blakely at 2019 FIG Artistic Gymnastics JWCH/Apparatus finals on Wikimedia Commons
5	(China) Ou Yushan	5.700	8.066		13.766	Category:Yushan Ou at 2019 FIG Artistic Gymnastics JWCH/Apparatus finals on Wikimedia Commons
6	(United States) Kayla DiCello	5.300	8.200		13.500	Category:Kayla DiCello at 2019 FIG Artistic Gymnastics JWCH/Apparatus finals on Wikimedia Commons
7	(Belgium) Stacy Bertrandt	5.000	8.100		13.100	Category:Stacy Bertrandt at 2019 FIG Artistic Gymnastics JWCH/Apparatus finals on Wikimedia Commons
8	(Belgium) Noémie Louon	5.100	8.000		13.100	Category:Noémie Louon at 2019 FIG Artistic Gymnastics JWCH/Apparatus finals on Wikimedia Commons

=== Balance beam ===
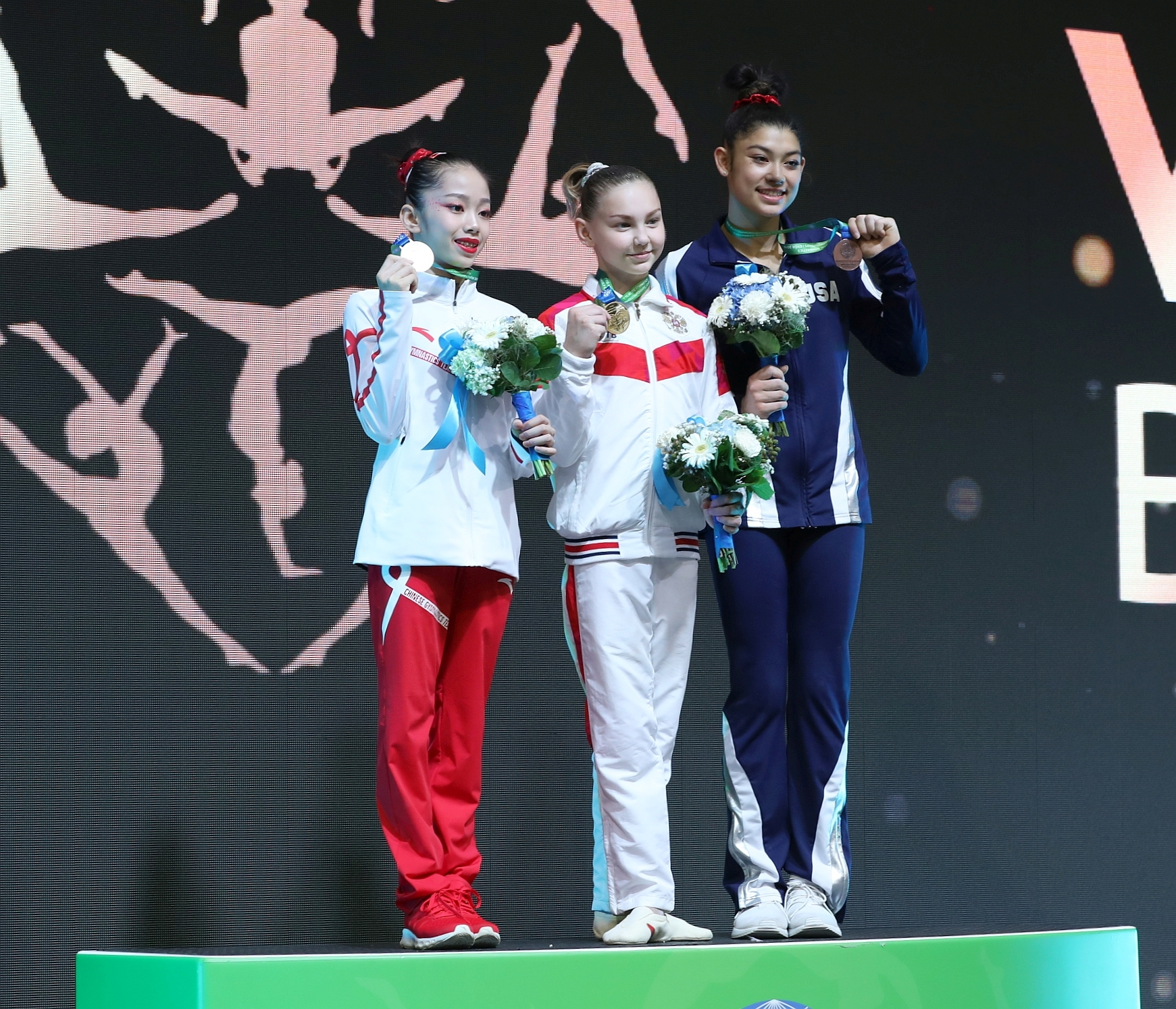
The Medal Ceremony for the Balance Beam Final Elena Gerasimova (Russia) Wei Xiaoyuan (China) Kayla DiCello (United States)

Oldest and youngest competitors

	Name	Country	Date of birth	Age
Youngest	Júlia Soares	Brazil	23 August 2005	13 years, 10 months and 7 days
Oldest	Ou Yushan	China	13 January 2004	15 years, 5 months and 17 days

Rank	Gymnast	D Score	E Score	Pen.	Total	Photos
1st place, gold medalist(s)	(Russia) Elena Gerasimova	5.900	8.300		14.200	Category:Elena Gerasimova at 2019 FIG Artistic Gymnastics JWCH/Apparatus finals on Wikimedia Commons
2nd place, silver medalist(s)	(China) Wei Xiaoyuan	5.400	8.333		13.733	Category:Xiaoyuan Wei at 2019 FIG Artistic Gymnastics JWCH/Apparatus finals on Wikimedia Commons
3rd place, bronze medalist(s)	(United States) Kayla DiCello	5.700	8.033		13.733	Category:Kayla DiCello at 2019 FIG Artistic Gymnastics JWCH/Apparatus finals on Wikimedia Commons
4	(Russia) Vladislava Urazova	5.700	7.966		13.666	Category:Vladislava Urazova at 2019 FIG Artistic Gymnastics JWCH/Apparatus finals on Wikimedia Commons
5	(Romania) Ioana Stănciulescu	5.400	7.966		13.366	Category:Ioana Stanciulescu at 2019 FIG Artistic Gymnastics JWCH/Apparatus finals on Wikimedia Commons
6	(United Kingdom) Jennifer Gadirova	5.000	8.133		13.133	Category:Jennifer Gadirova at 2019 FIG Artistic Gymnastics JWCH/Apparatus finals on Wikimedia Commons
7	(Brazil) Júlia Soares	5.000	7.366		12.366	Category:Julia Soares at 2019 FIG Artistic Gymnastics JWCH/Apparatus finals on Wikimedia Commons
8	(China) Ou Yushan	5.700	6.300		12.000	Category:Yushan Ou at 2019 FIG Artistic Gymnastics JWCH/Apparatus finals on Wikimedia Commons

=== Floor exercise ===
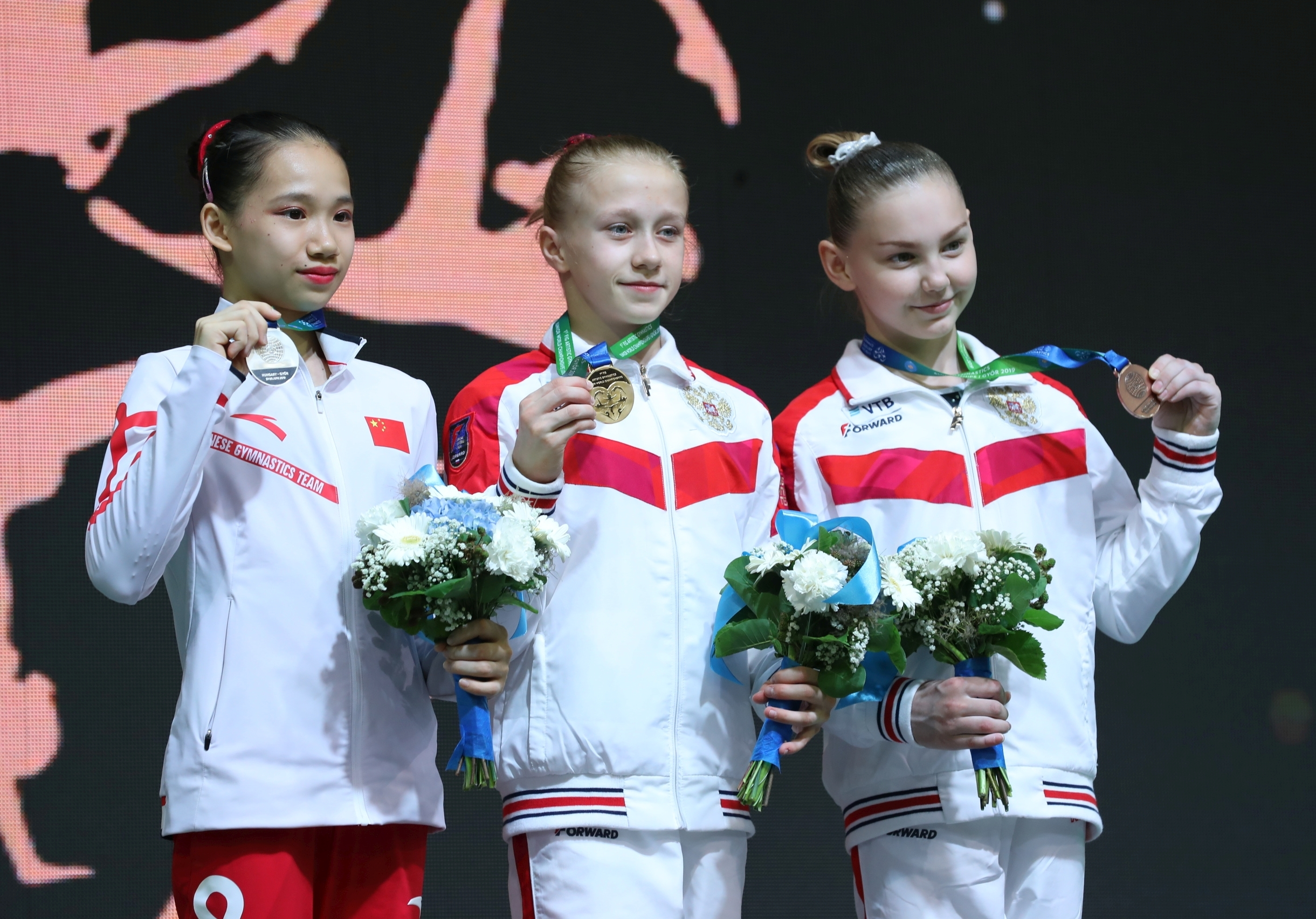
The Medal Ceremony for the Floor Exercise Final Viktoria Listunova (Russia) Ou Yushan (China) Elena Gerasimova (Russia)

Oldest and youngest competitors

	Name	Country	Date of birth	Age
Youngest	Viktoria Listunova	Russia	12 May 2005	14 years, 1 month and 18 days
Oldest	Ou Yushan	China	13 January 2004	15 years, 5 months and 17 days

Rank	Gymnast	D Score	E Score	Pen.	Total	Photos
1st place, gold medalist(s)	(Russia) Viktoria Listunova	5.400	8.766		14.166	Category:Viktoriia Listunova at 2019 FIG Artistic Gymnastics JWCH/Apparatus finals on Wikimedia Commons
2nd place, silver medalist(s)	(China) Ou Yushan	5.200	8.633		13.833	Category:Yushan Ou at 2019 FIG Artistic Gymnastics JWCH/Apparatus finals on Wikimedia Commons
3rd place, bronze medalist(s)	(Russia) Elena Gerasimova	5.300	8.233		13.533	Category:Elena Gerasimova at 2019 FIG Artistic Gymnastics JWCH/Apparatus finals on Wikimedia Commons
4	(United Kingdom) Jennifer Gadirova	4.900	8.366		13.266	Category:Jennifer Gadirova at 2019 FIG Artistic Gymnastics JWCH/Apparatus finals on Wikimedia Commons
5	(United States) Skye Blakely	5.200	8.000	0.100	13.100	Category:Skye Blakely at 2019 FIG Artistic Gymnastics JWCH/Apparatus finals on Wikimedia Commons
6	(Romania) Silviana Sfiringu	5.400	7.600		13.000	Category:Silviana Sfiringu at 2019 FIG Artistic Gymnastics JWCH/Apparatus finals on Wikimedia Commons
7	(United States) Kayla DiCello	5.200	8.066	0.300	12.966	Category:Kayla DiCello at 2019 FIG Artistic Gymnastics JWCH/Apparatus finals on Wikimedia Commons
8	(Romania) Ioana Stănciulescu	5.300	7.666		12.966	Category:Ioana Stanciulescu at 2019 FIG Artistic Gymnastics JWCH/Apparatus finals on Wikimedia Commons

== Qualification ==
=== Men's results ===
==== Floor exercise ====
Rank	Gymnast	D Score	E Score	Pen.	Total	Qual.
1	(South Korea) Ryu Sung-hyun	5.500	8.466		13.966	Q
2	(Japan) Takeru Kitazono	5.200	8.566		13.766	Q
3	(Canada) Félix Dolci	5.200	8.466		13.666	Q
4	(Japan) Ryosuke Doi	5.400	8.266		13.666	Q
5	(United Kingdom) Sam Mostowfi	5.000	8.633		13.633	Q
5	(United States) Matthew Cormier	5.000	8.633		13.633	Q
7	(Italy) Lorenzo Minh Casali	5.100	8.466		13.566	Q
8	(Ukraine) Nazar Chepurnyi	5.200	8.366		13.566	Q
9	(South Korea) Park Jin-ho	4.900	8.600		13.500	R1
10	(United Kingdom) Luke Whitehouse	4.600	8.733		13.333	R2
11	(Ukraine) Illia Kovtun	5.100	8.233		13.333	R3

==== Pommel horse ====
Rank	Gymnast	D Score	E Score	Pen.	Total	Qual.
1	(Japan) Shinnosuke Oka	5.200	8.700		13.900	Q
2	(Japan) Takeru Kitazono	5.100	8.533		13.633	Q
3	(Japan) Ryosuke Doi	5.000	8.466		13.466	–
4	(China) Yang Haonan	4.400	8.766		13.166	Q
5	(Armenia) Gagik Khachikyan	5.200	7.900		13.100	Q
6	(Latvia) Edvīns Rodevičs	4.700	8.366		13.066	Q
7	(Ukraine) Illia Kovtun	5.900	7.066		12.966	Q
8	(Azerbaijan) Samad Mammadli	4.900	8.000		12.900	Q
9	(Croatia) Mateo Žugec	4.500	8.366		12.866	Q
10	(Ukraine) Volodymyr Kostiuk	4.900	7.966		12.866	R1
11	(Canada) Evgeny Siminiuc	4.200	8.600		12.800	R2
12	(Italy) Lorenzo Bonicelli	4.400	8.400		12.800	R3
12	(Italy) Ivan Brunello	4.400	8.400		12.800	R3

==== Still rings ====
Rank	Gymnast	D Score	E Score	Pen.	Total	Qual.
1	(China) Yang Haonan	4.800	8.933		13.733	Q
2	(Canada) Félix Dolci	4.500	9.166		13.666	Q
3	(Brazil) Diogo Soares	4.500	9.033		13.533	Q
4	(Russia) Ivan Kuliak	4.500	8.966		13.466	Q
5	(China) Yang Yanzhi	4.900	8.566		13.466	Q
6	(United States) Garrett Braunton	4.400	9.033		13.433	Q
7	(Japan) Shinnosuke Oka	4.600	8.775		13.375	Q
8	(United States) Isaiah Drake	4.400	8.933		13.333	Q
9	(Ukraine) Nazar Chepurnyi	4.500	8.800		13.300	R1
10	(France) Leo Saladino	4.500	8.766		13.266	R2
11	(Canada) Evgeny Siminiuc	4.100	9.100		13.200	R3

==== Vault ====
Rank	Gymnast	Vault 1				Vault 2				Total	Qual.
Rank	Gymnast	D Score	E Score	Pen.	Score 1	D Score	E Score	Pen.	Score 2	Total	Qual.
1	(Romania) Gabriel Burtanete	5.200	9.166		14.366	5.200	9.000		14.200	14.283	Q
2	(China) Yang Haonan	5.200	9.100	0.100	14.200	4.800	9.366		14.166	14.183	Q
3	(New Zealand) Sam Dick	5.200	8.766		13.966	4.800	9.233		14.033	13.999	Q
4	(United Kingdom) Jasper Smith-Gordon	5.200	9.166		14.366	4.800	8.900	0.100	13.600	13.983	Q
5	(Brazil) João Viera	4.800	9.100		13.900	5.200	8.766		13.966	13.933	Q
6	(Brazil) Diogo Soares	4.800	9.200	0.100	13.900	4.400	9.216		13.616	13.758	Q
7	(France) Leo Saladino	5.200	9.100		14.300	5.200	7.900		13.100	13.700	Q
8	(Australia) James Hardy	4.800	8.966	0.100	13.666	5.200	8.383		13.583	13.624	Q
9	(Belgium) Victor Martinez	5.200	9.166	0.100	14.266	4.800	8.433	0.300	12.933	13.599	R1
10	(Romania) Robert Burtanete	5.200	8.600	0.300	13.500	4.800	8.800		13.600	13.550	R2
11	(United Kingdom) Sam Mostowfi	4.800	8.966		13.766	4.000	9.333		13.333	13.549	R3

==== Parallel bars ====
Rank	Gymnast	D Score	E Score	Pen.	Total	Qual.
1	(Japan) Takeru Kitazono	5.700	8.700		14.400	Q
2	(China) Yang Haonan	5.300	8.966		14.266	Q
3	(Ukraine) Illia Kovtun	5.700	8.233		13.933	Q
4	(Hungary) Krisztián Balázs	5.000	8.833		13.833	Q
5	(Turkey) Kerem Şener	4.900	8.800		13.700	Q
6	(Ukraine) Nazar Chepurnyi	5.400	8.266		13.666	Q
7	(Japan) Shinnosuke Oka	5.100	8.533		13.633	Q
8	(China) Li Hongyan	4.400	9.166		13.566	Q
9	(Japan) Ryosuke Doi	4.800	8.766		13.566	–
10	(Ukraine) Volodymyr Kostiuk	5.400	8.166		13.566	–
11	(Russia) Ivan Kuliak	5.000	8.466		13.466	R1
12	(Belgium) Victor Martinez	4.400	9.041		13.441	R2
13	(South Korea) Park Jin-ho	5.000	8.400		13.400	R3

==== Horizontal bar ====
Rank	Gymnast	D Score	E Score	Pen.	Total	Qual.
1	(France) Lucas Desanges	4.400	8.966		13.366	Q
2	(Italy) Ivan Brunello	4.500	8.866		13.366	Q
3	(Brazil) Diogo Soares	4.800	8.566		13.366	Q
4	(Russia) Ivan Gerget	4.700	8.466		13.166	Q
5	(Hungary) Krisztián Balázs	4.600	8.533		13.133	Q
6	(Australia) Jesse Moore	4.200	8.916		13.116	Q
7	(Ukraine) Nazar Chepurnyi	4.900	8.216		13.116	Q
8	(Germany) Arne Nicolai Halbisch	4.500	8.600		13.100	Q
9	(Russia) Kirill Gashkov	4.600	8.391		12.991	R1
10	(Italy) Lorenzo Bonicelli	4.200	8.766		12.966	R2
11	(Russia) Ivan Kuliak	4.300	8.666		12.966	–
12	(Ukraine) Illia Kovtun	5.300	7.666		12.966	R3

=== Women's results ===
==== Vault ====
Rank	Gymnast	Vault 1				Vault 2				Total	Qual.
Rank	Gymnast	D Score	E Score	Pen.	Score 1	D Score	E Score	Pen.	Score 2	Total	Qual.
1	(United States) Sydney Barros	5.400	9.108	0.100	14.408	4.600	9.241		13.841	14.124	Q
2	(Russia) Vladislava Urazova	5.400	8.866		14.266	5.000	9.033	0.100	13.933	14.099	Q
3	(United States) Kayla DiCello	5.400	8.900		14.300	4.600	9.166		13.766	14.033	Q
4	(United States) Skye Blakely	5.400	8.833		14.233	4.600	9.166		13.766	13.999	–
5	(United Kingdom) Jennifer Gadirova	5.000	9.133		14.133	4.600	9.200		13.800	13.966	Q
6	(Ukraine) Anastasiia Motak	5.400	8.741		14.141	5.000	8.566		13.566	13.853	Q
7	(Russia) Viktoria Listunova	5.400	8.825		14.225	4.600	8.800		13.400	13.812	Q
8	(China) Guan Chenchen	5.600	8.400		14.000	4.800	8.566		13.366	13.683	Q
9	(Italy) Camilla Campagnaro	5.400	8.333		13.733	4.800	8.666		13.466	13.599	Q
10	(Japan) Shoko Miyata	5.400	8.466		13.866	4.800	8.500		13.300	13.583	R1
11	(Japan) Chiaki Hatakeda	5.000	8.633		13.633	4.800	8.600		13.400	13.516	R2
12	(Panama) Hillary Heron	5.000	8.633		13.633	4.600	8.666		13.266	13.449	R3

==== Uneven bars ====
Rank	Gymnast	D Score	E Score	Pen.	Total	Qual.
1	(Russia) Viktoria Listunova	5.700	8.666		14.366	Q
2	(Russia) Vladislava Urazova	5.800	8.466		14.266	Q
3	(Russia) Elena Gerasimova	5.600	8.533		14.133	–
4	(China) Ou Yushan	5.700	8.266		13.966	Q
5	(United States) Skye Blakely	5.500	8.408		13.908	Q
6	(United States) Kayla DiCello	5.400	8.433		13.833	Q
7	(China) Wei Xiaoyuan	5.700	8.066		13.766	Q
8	(Belgium) Noémie Louon	5.100	8.333		13.433	Q
9	(United States) Sydney Barros	5.300	8.100		13.400	–
10	(Belgium) Stacy Bertrandt	5.000	8.266		13.266	Q
11	(Germany) Emma Leonie Malewski	5.100	7.933		13.033	R1
12	(South Korea) Lee Da-yeong	5.400	7.533		12.933	R2
13	(China) Guan Chenchen	4.800	8.016		12.816	–
14	(South Korea) Shin Sol-yi	5.300	7.500		12.800	R3

==== Balance beam ====
Rank	Gymnast	D Score	E Score	Pen.	Total	Qual.
1	(China) Ou Yushan	5.900	8.166		14.066	Q
2	(China) Wei Xiaoyuan	5.600	8.400		14.000	Q
3	(Russia) Elena Gerasimova	5.700	7.866		13.566	Q
4	(Romania) Ioana Stănciulescu	5.600	7.866		13.466	Q
5	(United States) Kayla DiCello	5.400	7.966		13.366	Q
6	(Brazil) Júlia Soares	5.100	8.133		13.233	Q
7	(United Kingdom) Jennifer Gadirova	5.000	8.166		13.166	Q
8	(Russia) Vladislava Urazova	5.400	7.866	0.100	13.166	Q
9	(South Korea) Lee Da-yeong	5.100	7.966		13.066	R1
10	(France) Taïs Boura	5.000	7.966		12.966	R2
11	(United States) Sydney Barros	5.300	7.666		12.966	R3

==== Floor exercise ====
Rank	Gymnast	D Score	E Score	Pen.	Total	Qual.
1	(Russia) Viktoria Listunova	5.500	8.666		14.166	Q
2	(China) Ou Yushan	5.100	8.566		13.666	Q
3	(Russia) Elena Gerasimova	5.300	8.333		13.633	Q
4	(Russia) Vladislava Urazova	5.500	8.400	0.300	13.600	–
5	(United Kingdom) Jennifer Gadirova	5.000	8.533		13.533	Q
6	(Romania) Ioana Stănciulescu	5.300	8.100		13.400	Q
7	(Romania) Silviana Sfringu	5.500	7.866		13.366	Q
8	(United States) Skye Blakely	5.200	8.133		13.333	Q
9	(United States) Kayla DiCello	5.200	8.066		13.266	Q
10	(United States) Sydney Barros	5.000	8.200		13.200	–
11	(Brazil) Júlia Soares	4.900	8.166		13.066	R1
12	(Belgium) Lisa Vaelen	4.800	8.066		12.866	R2
13	(Belgium) Noémie Louon	4.700	8.133		12.833	R3
