= Jennifer Williams (gymnast) =

Swedish artistic gymnast

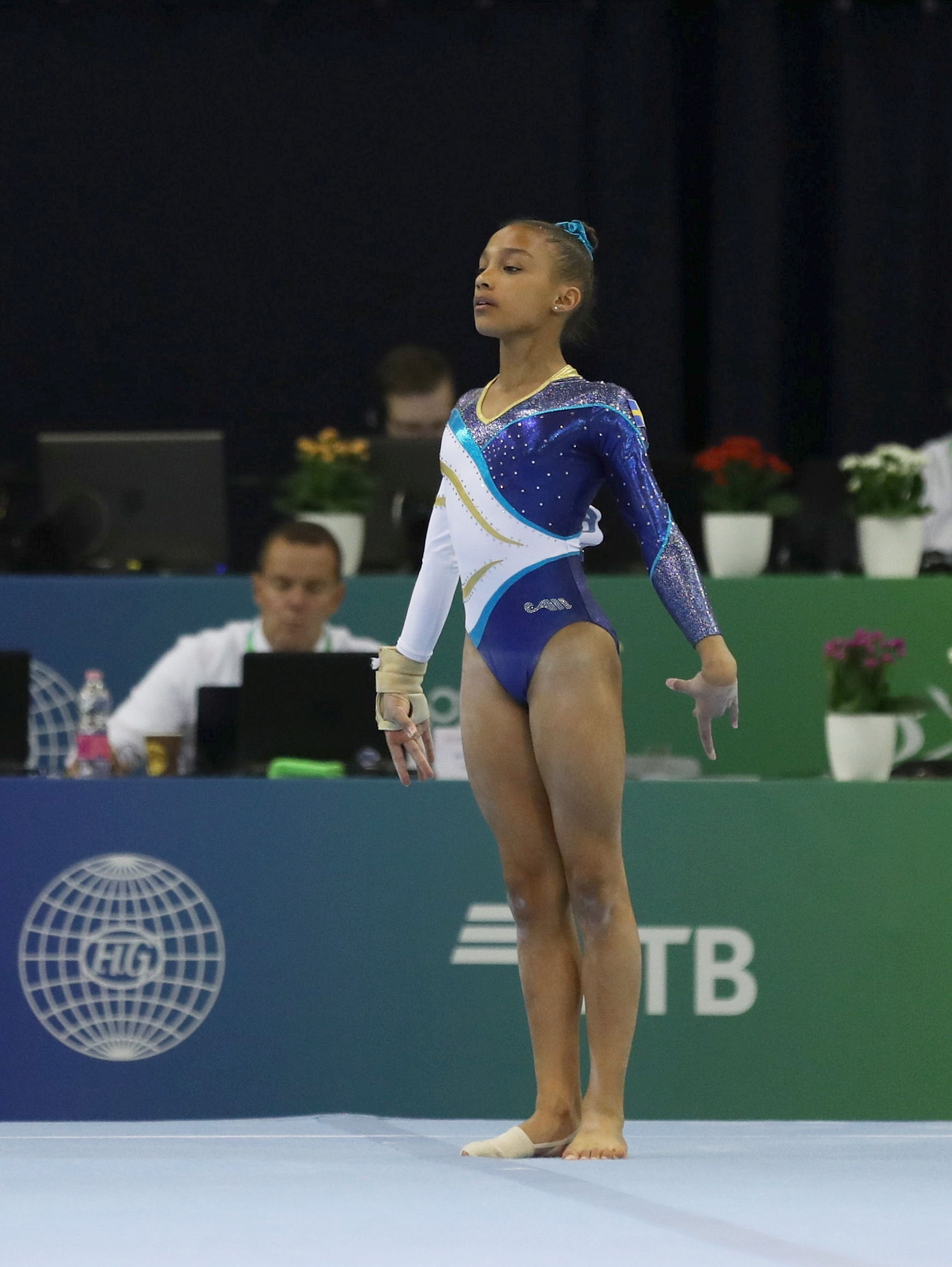
- Williams at the 2019 Junior World Championships

Personal information
- Full name: Jennifer Williams
- Born: 11 October 2005 (age 20) Spånga, Sweden

Gymnastics career
- Discipline: Women's artistic gymnastics
- Country represented: Sweden; (2018–present)
- College team: Stanford Cardinal (2026–29)
- Club: Eskilstuna Gymnastikförening
- Head coach: Helena Andersson Melander
Medal record
Women's artistic gymnastics
Representing Sweden
Nordic Championships
Gold medal – first place	2018 Farum	Balance beam
Gold medal – first place	2019 Västerås	Uneven bars
Gold medal – first place	2019 Västerås	Floor exercise
Gold medal – first place	2026 Åland	Team
Silver medal – second place	2018 Farum	Team
Silver medal – second place	2026 Åland	All-around
Bronze medal – third place	2019 Västerås	Team
Bronze medal – third place	2019 Västerås	All-around

Jennifer Williams (born 11 October 2005) is a Swedish artistic gymnast. She represented Sweden at the inaugural junior World Championships. She is a three-time Nordic junior champion.

== Early life ==
Williams was born in Spånga, Sweden.

== Junior gymnastics career ==
=== 2018 ===
Williams competed at the Unni & Haralds Trophy where she placed sixth in the all-around and fifth on the uneven bars. As a result, she was selected to represent Sweden at the 2018 Nordic Championships. While there she helped Sweden place second. Individually she placed fifteenth in the all-around but won gold on the balance beam. Williams ended the season competing at her first Swedish Championships. She placed fifth in the all-around and second on balance beam behind Tonya Paulsson.

=== 2019 ===
Williams competed at the Nordic Championships she helped Sweden place third. Individually she placed third in the all-around behind Camille Rasmussen and Maisa Kuusikko but won gold on uneven bars and floor exercise. Williams was selected to represent Sweden at the inaugural Junior World Championships. She finished 25th in the all-around. Williams ended the season competing at the European Youth Olympic Festival where she helped Sweden finish 16th as a team.

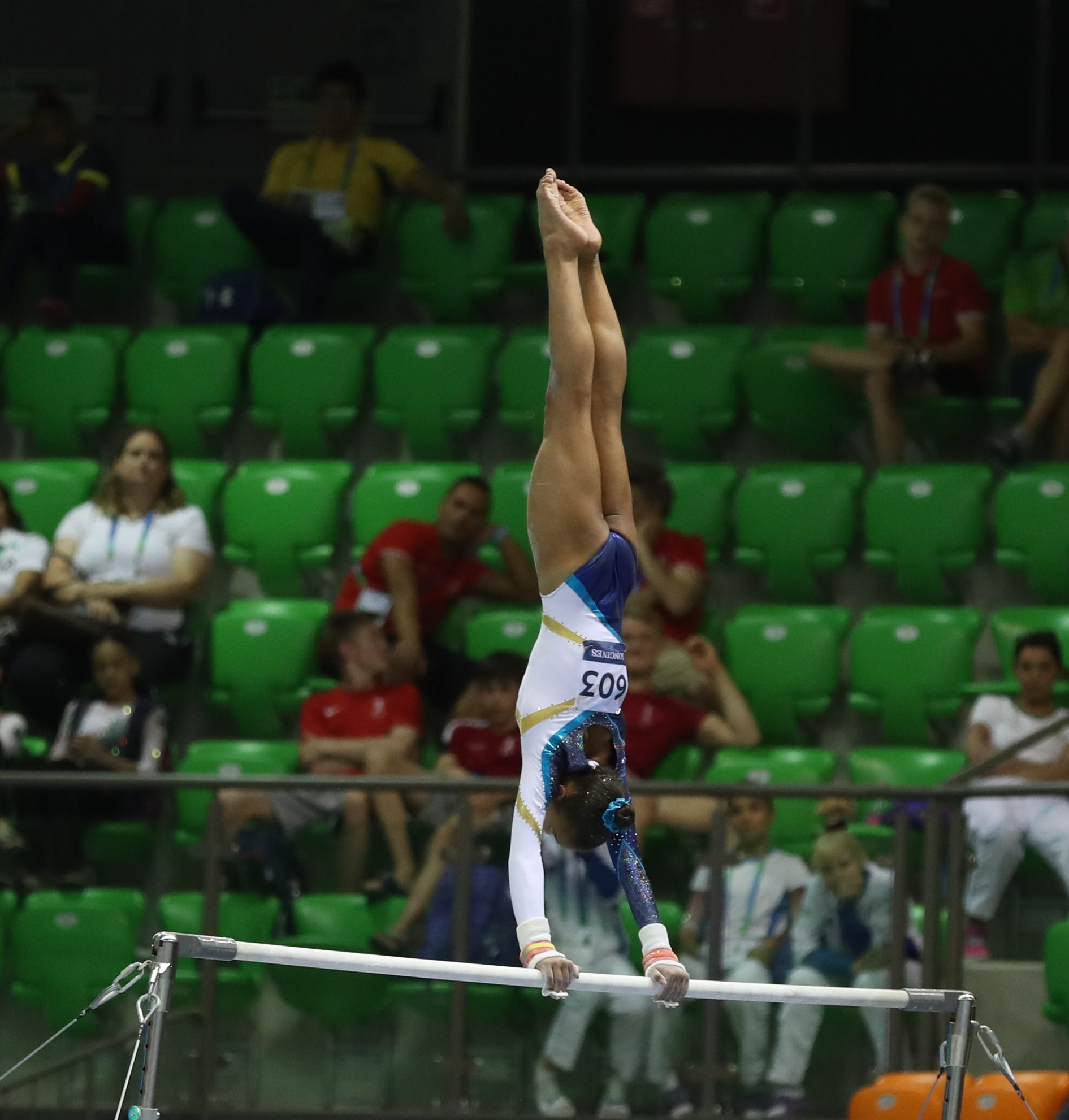
Uneven Bars

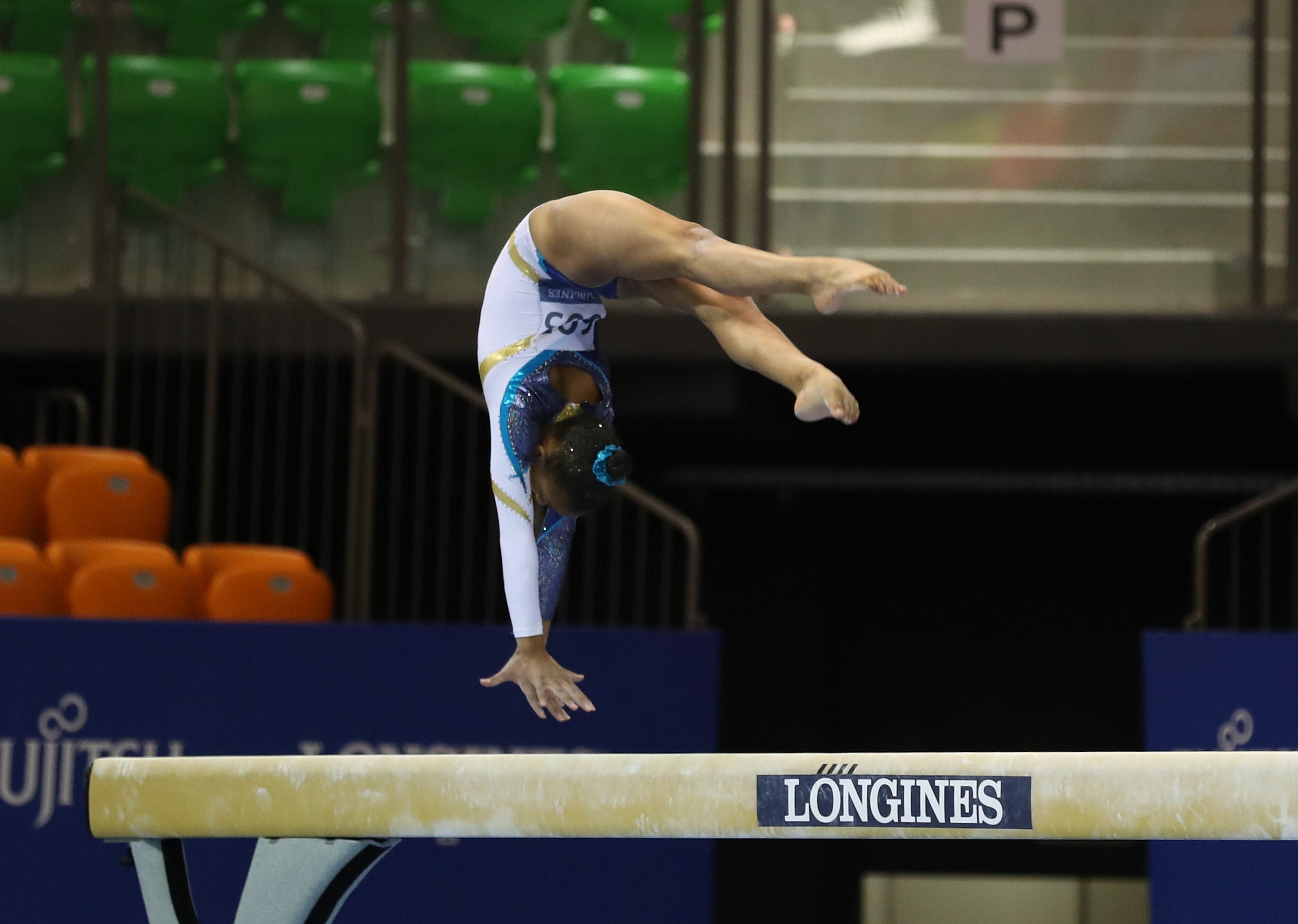
Balance Beam

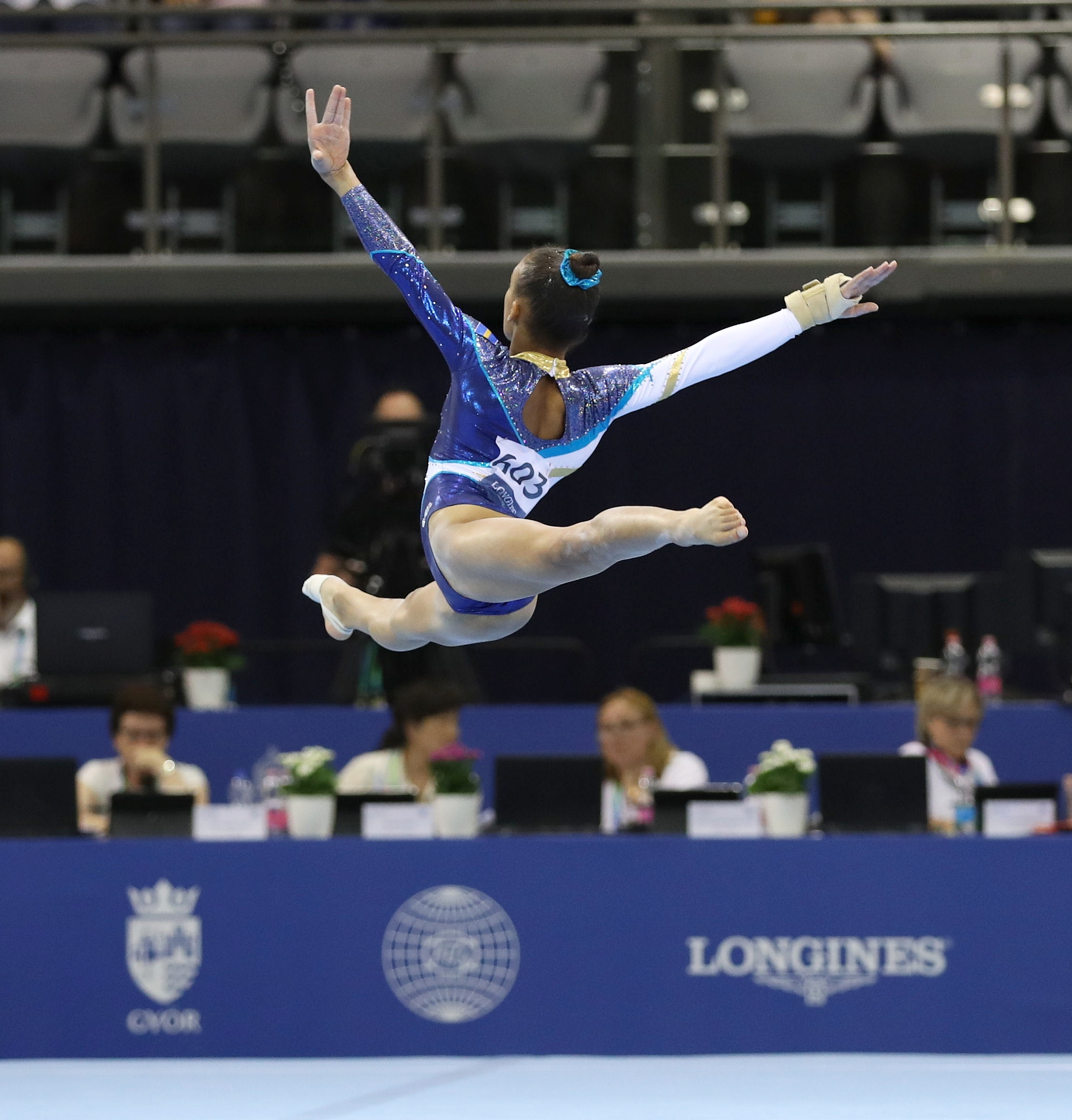
Floor Exercise

Williams at the 2019 Junior World Championships

== Senior gymnastics career ==
=== 2021 ===
Williams turned senior in 2021 and competed at the European Championships. She only competed on balance beam and placed 36th during qualification. She next competed at the Osijek Challenge Cup where she qualified to the floor exercise final and placed fifth. In September Williams was selected to compete at the World Championships alongside Nathalie Westlund and Tonya Paulsson.

=== 2022 ===
Williams did not compete during 2022 due to illness.

=== 2023 ===
Williams returned to international competition at the 2023 World Artistic Gymnastics Championships. She was the top Swedish gymnast in the all-around competition, where she placed 54th.

=== 2024 ===
Williams competed the Cottbus World Cup, where she advanced to her first World Cup final in the balance beam and placed 6th. She also competed at the Baku World Cup, placed 4th in the uneven bars with a personal best score of 13.566, and at the Doha World Cup, placed 5th in the floor exercise with a personal best score of 13.133.

Williams competed at the 2024 European Gymnastics Championships, where she placed advanced to the final in the team competition and placed 8th. She also competed in the all-around where she placed 17th.

== Competitive history ==
Year	Event	Team	AA	VT	UB	BB	FX
Junior
2018	Unni & Haralds Trophy		6		5		
2018	Nordic Championships	2nd place, silver medalist(s)	15			1st place, gold medalist(s)	
2018	Swedish Championships		5	8	8	2nd place, silver medalist(s)	5
2019	Nordic Championships	3rd place, bronze medalist(s)	3rd place, bronze medalist(s)		1st place, gold medalist(s)		1st place, gold medalist(s)
2019	FIT Challenge	11	20				
2019	Junior World Championships		25				
2019	Euro Youth Olympic Festival	16					
Senior
2021
2021	European Championships					36	
2021	Osijek Challenge Cup						5
2021	FIT Challenge	7					
2021	RomGym Trophy		5				2nd place, silver medalist(s)
2021	World Championships		23				
2023
2023	World Championships		54				
2024	Cottbus World Cup					6	
2024	Baku World Cup				4		
2024	Doha World Cup						5
2024	European Championships	8	17				
2025	Osijek World Cup					3rd place, bronze medalist(s)	
2025	Varna World Challenge Cup						3rd place, bronze medalist(s)
2025	European Championships	7				6	8
2026	Nordic Championships	1st place, gold medalist(s)	2nd place, silver medalist(s)		1st place, gold medalist(s)	3rd place, bronze medalist(s)	1st place, gold medalist(s)
2026	European Championships	12					
2026	World Championships						
