= Gymnastics at the European Games – Women's floor exercise =

The European Games were first held in 2015 and are held every four years.

Three medals are awarded: gold for first place, silver for second place, and bronze for third place. Tie breakers have not been used in every year. In the event of a tie between two gymnasts, both names are listed, and the following position (second for a tie for first, third for a tie for second) is left empty because a medal was not awarded for that position. If three gymnastics tied for a position, the following two positions are left empty.

== Medalists ==
Year	Location	Gold	Silver	Bronze	Ref
2015	(Azerbaijan) Baku	(Switzerland) Giulia Steingruber	(Russia) Aliya Mustafina	(Netherlands) Lieke Wevers	
2019	(Belarus) Minsk	(Ukraine) Anastasia Bachynska	(Czech Republic) Aneta Holasová	(Sweden) Jessica Castles	
