= David Rumbutis =

Swedish artistic gymnast

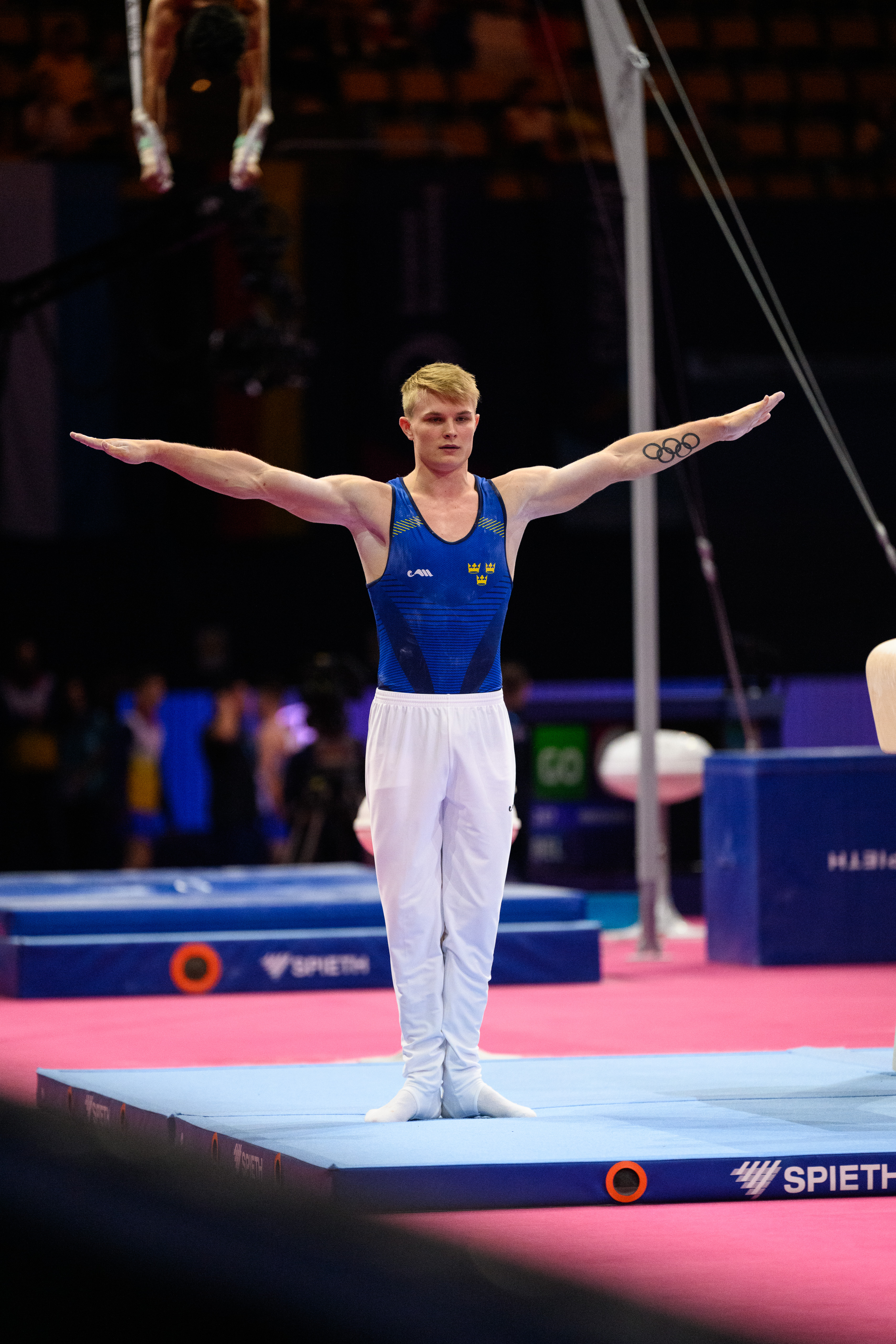
- Rumbutis at the 2022 European Championships

Personal information
- Full name: David Filip Rumbutis
- Born: 17 March 2000 (age 26) Älvsbyn, Sweden

Gymnastics career
- Discipline: Men's artistic gymnastics
- Country represented: Sweden
- Club: All Star Gymnastics
- Head coach: Sergei Rumbutis
Medal record
Men's artistic gymnastics
Representing Sweden
Northern European Championships
Gold medal – first place	2017 Tórshavn	Team
Gold medal – first place	2017 Tórshavn	All-around
Gold medal – first place	2017 Tórshavn	Vault
Silver medal – second place	2016 Trondheim	Team
Silver medal – second place	2016 Trondheim	Vault
Silver medal – second place	2017 Tórshavn	Parallel bars
Nordic Championships
Gold medal – first place	2018 Farum	Team
Gold medal – first place	2018 Farum	All-around
Gold medal – first place	2018 Farum	Pommel horse
Gold medal – first place	2018 Farum	Vault
Gold medal – first place	2018 Farum	Horizontal bar
Gold medal – first place	2022 Kópavogur	Team
Gold medal – first place	2022 Kópavogur	Parallel bars
Silver medal – second place	2022 Kópavogur	All-around
Silver medal – second place	2022 Kópavogur	Pommel horse
Bronze medal – third place	2018 Farum	Parallel bars

David Filip Rumbutis (born 17 March 2000) is a Swedish artistic gymnast. He competed in the 2020 Summer Olympics.

== Early life ==
Rumbutis was born on 17 March 2000 in Älvsbyn to Lithuanian father and Swedish mother. His father, Sergei Rumbutis, competed for the Soviet Union in gymnastics, and his mother is a gymnastics judge. His older sister, Julia, competed internationally for Sweden and then Georgia. He has another older sister named Adina who also competed in gymnastics.

== Career ==
Rumbutis competed at the 2016 Junior European Championships and finished 17th in the all-around final. At the 2016 Northern European Championships, he won silver medals with the team and in the vault final. Then at the 2017 Northern European Championships, he won the individual all-around and vault titles in addition to Sweden winning the team title.

Rumbutis won the all-around title at the 2018 Nordic Championships, and he won the pommel horse, vault, horizontal bar, and team titles. He placed 19th in the all-around at the 2018 Junior European Championships.

Rumbutis finished 49th in the all-around qualification round at the 2019 World Championships and earned a berth for the 2020 Summer Olympics. At the 2021 European Championships, he qualified for the all-around final and finished 13th. He then represented Sweden at the 2020 Summer Olympics and finished 61st in the all-around during the qualification round.

At the 2021 World Championships, Rumbutis dislocated his kneecap on a Yurchenko triple twist vault and could not finish the competition. He returned to competition in 2022 and won the parallel bars title at the 2022 Nordic Championships. He also won the silver medals in the all-around and on the pommel horse. He had another surgery on his knee in December 2022.

At the 2023 Cottbus World Cup, Rumbutis broke his foot on a vault landing. He withdrew from the 2023 European Championships due to the injury, meaning he could not compete at the 2023 World Championships and had limited opportunities to qualify for the 2024 Summer Olympics.
