= Camille Rasmussen =

Danish artistic gymnast

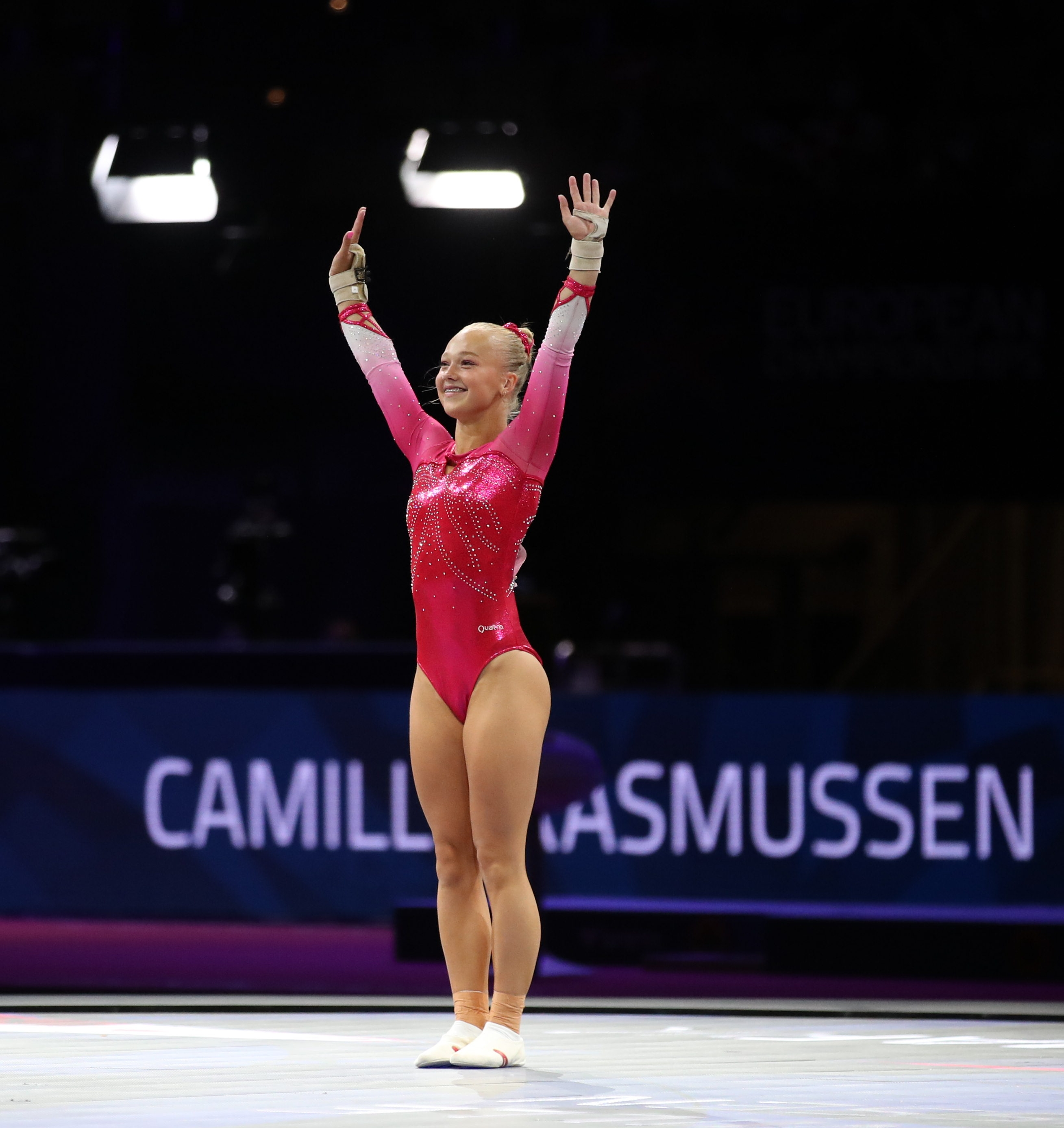
- Rasmussen at the 2022 European Championships

Personal information
- Full name: Camille Lund Rasmussen
- Born: 15 June 2004 (age 22) Copenhagen, Denmark
- Height: 5 ft 2 in (157 cm)

Gymnastics career
- Discipline: Women's artistic gymnastics
- Country represented: Denmark; (2016–2024)
- College team: Long Island University (2025-2028)
- Club: KG66
- Head coach: Taylor Colwell (LIU)
- Assistant coaches: Dalton Struebin (LIU); Aleah Cassmeyer (LIU)
- Former coaches: Bernadett Balazs (KG66); Aleksandr (KG66); Jazmyn Foberg (LIU)
Medal record
Women's artistic gymnastics
Representing Denmark
Northern European Championships
Gold medal – first place	2017 Tórshavn	Floor Exercise
Gold medal – first place	2019 Kópavogur	Vault
Silver medal – second place	2017 Tórshavn	Vault
Bronze medal – third place	2019 Kópavogur	All-Around
Bronze medal – third place	2022 Jyväskylä	Vault
FIG World Cup
Event	1st	2nd	3rd
Apparatus World Cup	0	1	0
World Challenge Cup	0	1	0
Total	0	2	0

Camille Lund Rasmussen (born 15 June 2004) is a Danish artistic gymnast. She represented Denmark at the inaugural junior World Championships. She is the 2020, 2021, 2022, and 2023 Danish senior national champion and is a two-time Northern European champion.

== Early life ==
Camille Rasmussen was born in Copenhagen, Denmark. She began training in gymnastics when she was five years old.

== Junior gymnastics career ==
=== 2016 ===
Rasmussen competed at her first national championships where she placed first in the espoir division. She competed at the Gymnova Cup where she placed third in the all-around in the espoir division behind Lisa Vaelen and Miriam Hamenni. She finished the year competing at the Turnkunst International where she placed first in the all-around.

=== 2017 ===
Rasmussen competed at the Austrian Team Open and finished third behind Jasmin Mader and Barbora Mokošová. She competed at the Nordic Junior Championships where she placed second in the all-around behind Enni Kettunen. She finished first on balance beam, second on floor exercise behind Jessica Castles, third on vault behind Kettunen and Sani Mäkelä, and sixth on uneven bars. Rasmussen ended the year competing at the Northern European Championships where she placed fifth in the all-around but won gold on floor exercise and silver on vault.

=== 2018 ===
Rasmussen continued her dominance at the Danish Championships, winning her third gold in the all-around. In June she competed at the Nordic Championships where she placed third in the all-around behind Mari Kanter and Tonya Paulsson but won gold on floor exercise. Rasmussen competed at the European Championships and finished 33rd in the all-around.

=== 2019 ===
At the Nordic Championships Rasmussen placed first in the all-around ahead of Maisa Kuusikko. She won the junior national title at the Danish Championships and was selected to compete at the inaugural Junior World Championships. Rasmussen finished 36th in the all-around. She next competed at the European Youth Olympic Festival where she qualified to the all-around final and was the third reserve for the balance beam final. She finished 19th in the all-around. Rasmussen ended her junior career competing at the Northern European Championships. She placed third in the all-around behind Welsh gymnasts Emily Thomas and Poppy Stickler. Rasmussen won gold on vault.

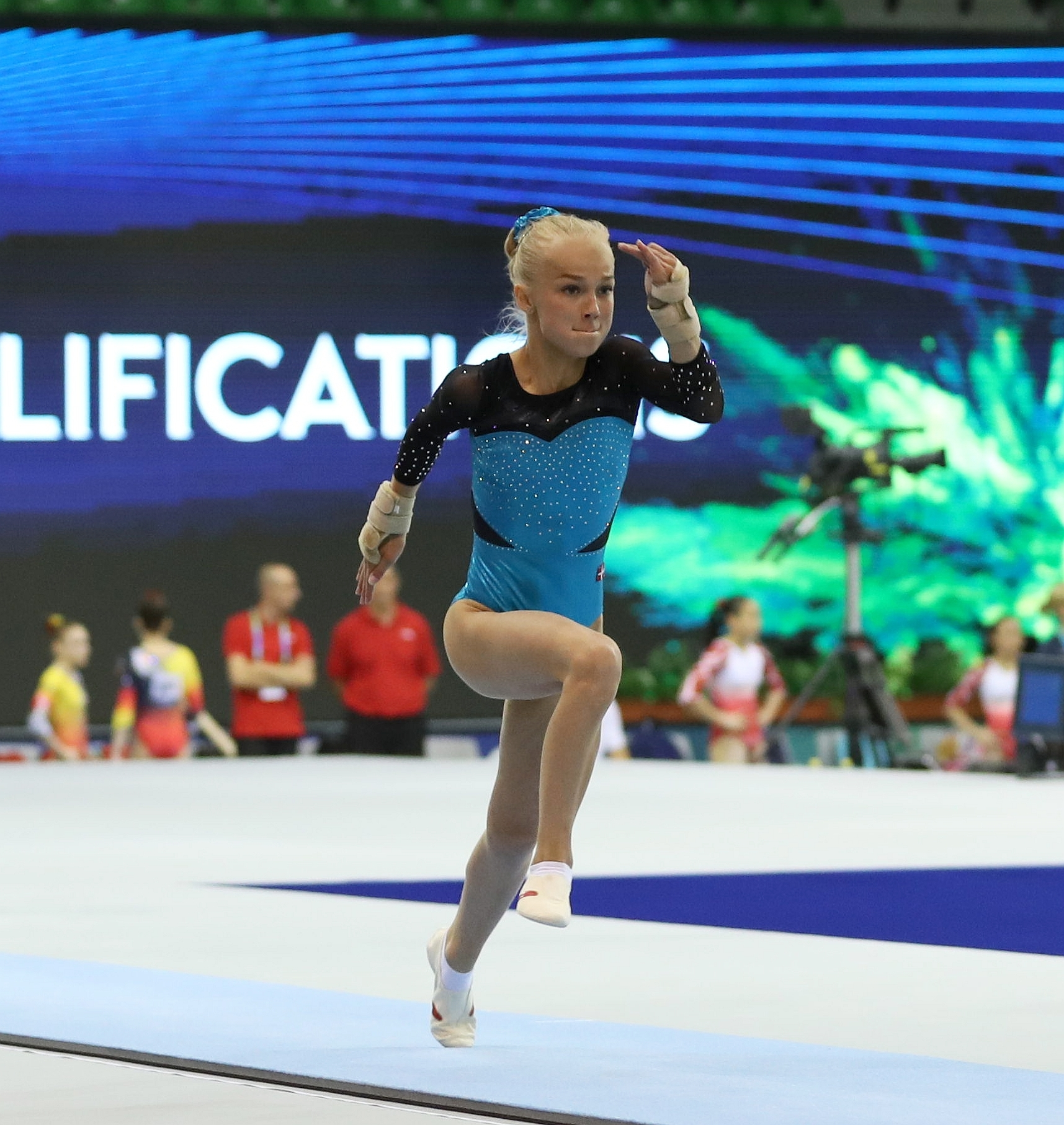
Vault

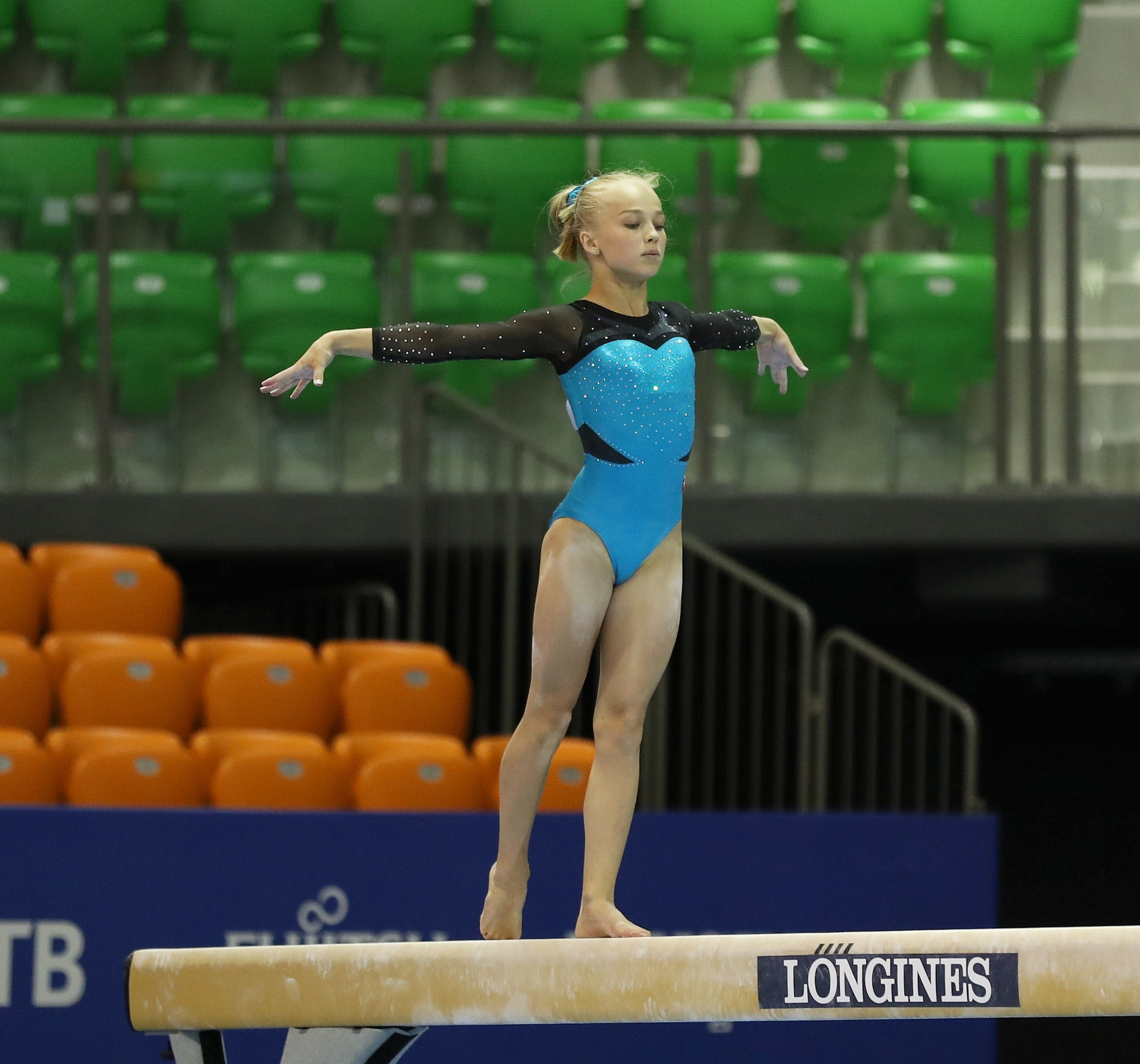
Balance Beam

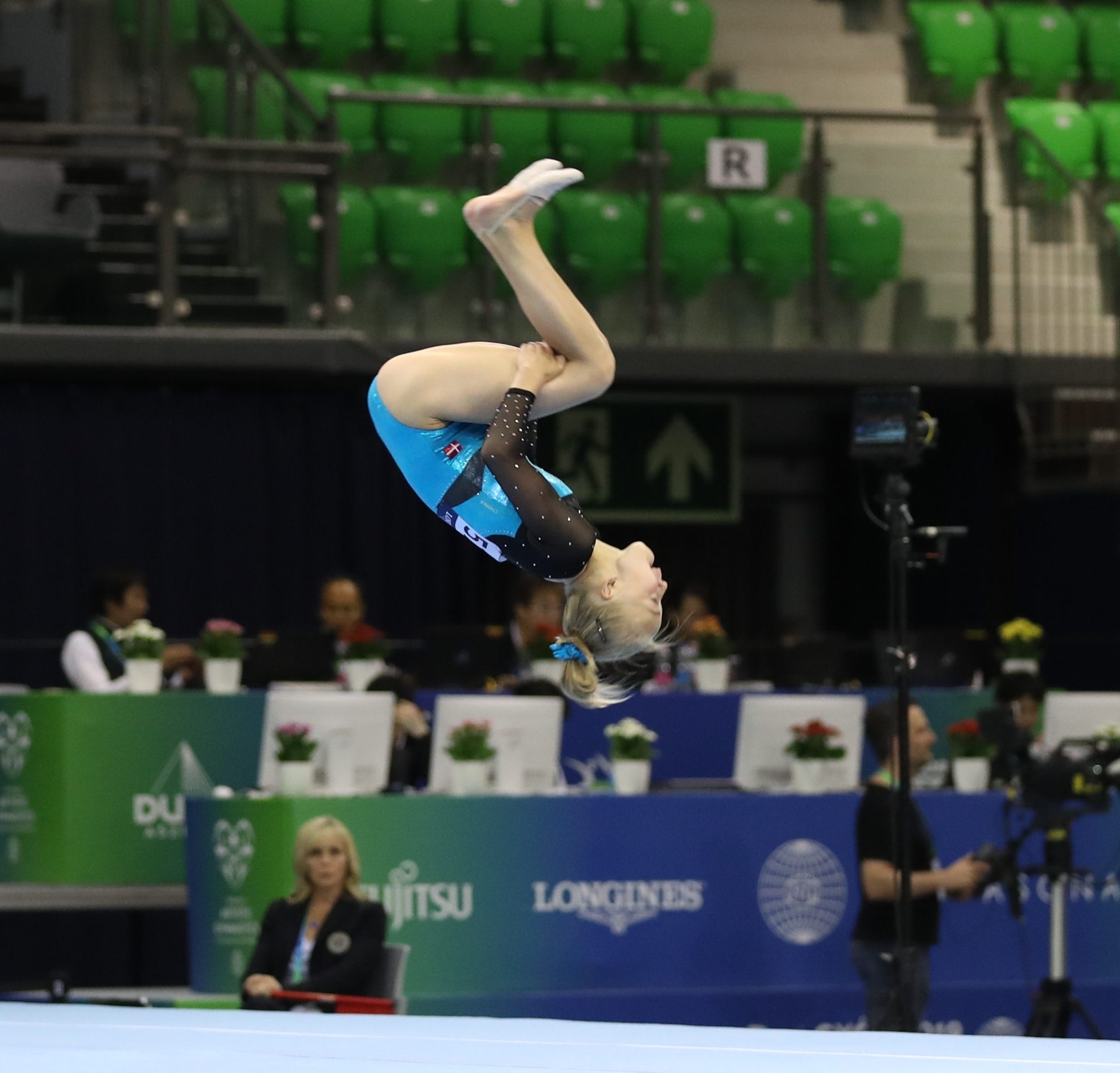
Floor Exercise

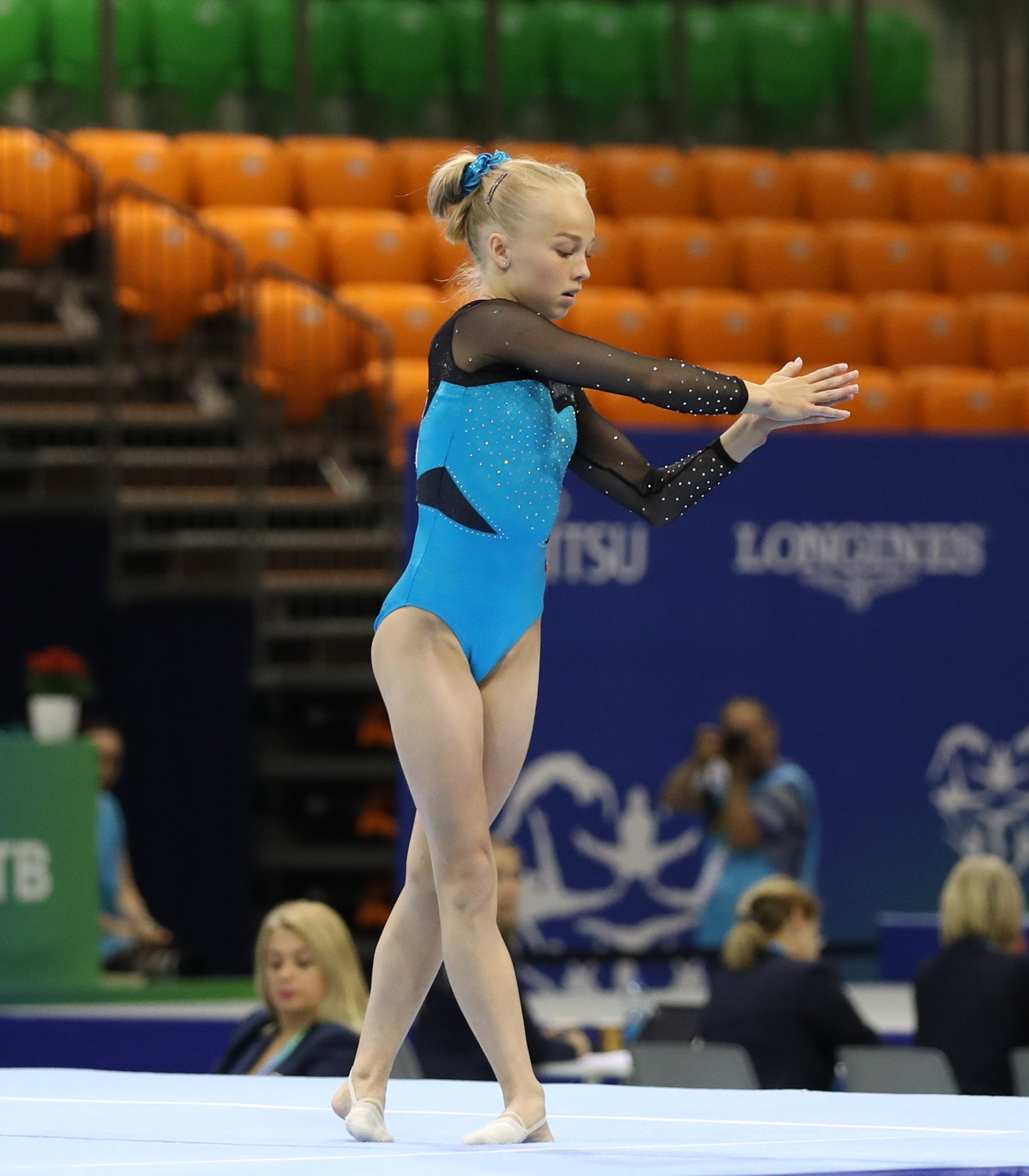
Floor Exercise

Rasmussen at the 2019 Junior World Championships

== Senior gymnastics career ==
=== 2020 ===
Rasmussen turned senior in 2020; however the mass majority of competitions were either canceled or postponed due to the global COVID-19 pandemic. In November Rasmussen competed at the Danish Championships where she won her first senior all-around title. Additionally she won gold on vault, uneven bars, and balance beam and placed second on floor exercise behind Victoria Gilberg.

=== 2021 ===
Rasmussen made her senior international debut at the 2021 European Championships where she placed 44th in the all-around during qualifications. In June she competed at the Danish Championships where she defended her all-around title. Additionally she defended her vault, uneven bars, and balance beam titles and placed third on floor exercise. In October she competed at the 2021 World Championships. During qualifications she finished 36th in the all-around; she did not qualify for any event finals. However, by finishing 36th she became the highest placing Danish gymnast in World Championships history, surpassing Mette Hulgaard's 53rd place in 2013.

=== 2022 ===
Rasmussen competed at the Varna Challenge Cup where she won silver on vault behind Aline Friess. She next competed at the Nordic Championships, winning silver in the all-around. At the European Championships Rasmussen finished 20th in the all-around. As a result she qualified to compete as an individual at the World Championships later in the year. Additionally Rasmussen qualified for the vault final where she finished sixth. Rasmussen was the first Danish gymnast to ever compete in an event final at the European Championships. In October she competed at the 2022 World Artistic Gymnastics Championships where she placed 35th in the all-around and didn't qualify for any event finals. In November she competed at the 2022 Northern European Gymnastics Championships where she won a bronze medal on vault and placed 13th in the all-around.

=== 2023 ===
Rasmussen competed the Doha World Cup where she won silver on vault behind Coline Devillard. In April she competed at the European Championships where she finished 35th in the all-around and 8th on vault. Later that month she finished 5th on vault at the Cairo World Cup. In May she became the senior Danish all-around champion. She next competed at the Paris Challenge Cup where she placed 5th on vault. She qualified to compete as an individual at 2023 World Artistic Gymnastics Championships at the 2023 European Artistic Gymnastics Championships earlier in the year. She finished 87th in the all-around and did not qualify for any event finals.

=== 2024 ===
Rasmussen started the 2024 season at the Cairo World Cup where she finished 8th on vault. The week after she competed at the Cottbus World Cup however she didn't qualify for any event finals. At this competition she fractured her fibula and had to pull out of the Baku World Cup and the Doha World Cup. In May she competed at the 2024 European Women's Artistic Gymnastics Championships where she placed 28th in the all-around and 6th on vault.

She joined Long Island University's NCAA gymnastics team in the 2024–2025 season.

== NCAA gymnastics career ==
=== 2024-2025 ===
Rasmussen began attending Long Island University in the fall of 2024 and joined the LIU Sharks gymnastics program on a full-ride scholarship. During the warm-up for the first meet of the season she injured her ankle, and was out for the rest of the season.

=== 2025-2026 ===
Rasmussen made her collegiate debut on 10 January 2026 where she scored a 9.550 on uneven bars and a 9.450 on balance beam. On 7 February 2026 she made her collegiate debut on floor exercise where she scored a 9.525. On 6 March 2026 she made her collegiate debut on vault scoring a 8.900.

Highest scores of the season:

Vault: 8.900 on 6 March 2026 @ Southern Connecticut State University.

Uneven Bars: 9.825 on 21 March 2026 @ Eagl Championships.

Balance Beam: 9.675 on 24 January 2026 @ University of Bridgeport and on 14 February 2026 @ State University of New York at Cortland.

Floor Exercise: 9.825 on 20 February 2026 against University of New Hampshire, University of Bridgeport, and University of Rhode Island.

== Competitive history ==
Competitive history of Camille Rasmussen at the junior level
Year	Event	Team	AA	VT	UB	BB	FX
2016	Danish Championships		1st place, gold medalist(s)	2nd place, silver medalist(s)	3rd place, bronze medalist(s)	2nd place, silver medalist(s)	3rd place, bronze medalist(s)
2016	Gymnova Cup		3rd place, bronze medalist(s)			2nd place, silver medalist(s)	
2016	Turnkunst International		1st place, gold medalist(s)				
2017	Austrian Team Open	4	3rd place, bronze medalist(s)				
2017	Danish Championships		1st place, gold medalist(s)	2nd place, silver medalist(s)		1st place, gold medalist(s)	1st place, gold medalist(s)
2017	Nordic Championships	5	2nd place, silver medalist(s)	3rd place, bronze medalist(s)	6	1st place, gold medalist(s)	2nd place, silver medalist(s)
2017	Gymnova Cup		1st place, gold medalist(s)	3rd place, bronze medalist(s)		1st place, gold medalist(s)	2nd place, silver medalist(s)
2017	Northern European Championships	5	5	2nd place, silver medalist(s)			1st place, gold medalist(s)
2018	Elek Matolay Memorial				3rd place, bronze medalist(s)	6	3rd place, bronze medalist(s)
2018	Danish Championships		1st place, gold medalist(s)	1st place, gold medalist(s)	2nd place, silver medalist(s)	1st place, gold medalist(s)	1st place, gold medalist(s)
2018	Nordic Championships	4	3rd place, bronze medalist(s)	4	3rd place, bronze medalist(s)	5	1st place, gold medalist(s)
2018	European Championships	24	33				
2019	Elek Matolay Memorial		2nd place, silver medalist(s)		2nd place, silver medalist(s)	4	5
2019	Danish Championships		1st place, gold medalist(s)	1st place, gold medalist(s)	1st place, gold medalist(s)	1st place, gold medalist(s)	1st place, gold medalist(s)
2019	Nordic Championships	4	1st place, gold medalist(s)	2nd place, silver medalist(s)	6	3rd place, bronze medalist(s)	2nd place, silver medalist(s)
2019	Junior World Championships		36				
2019	Euro Youth Olympic Festival		19			R3	
2019	Northern European Championships	6	3rd place, bronze medalist(s)	1st place, gold medalist(s)	5	5	

Competitive history of Camille Rasmussen at the senior level
Year	Event	Team	AA	VT	UB	BB	FX
2020	Danish Championships		1st place, gold medalist(s)	1st place, gold medalist(s)	1st place, gold medalist(s)	1st place, gold medalist(s)	2nd place, silver medalist(s)
2021
2021	European Championships		44				
2021	Danish Championships		1st place, gold medalist(s)	1st place, gold medalist(s)	1st place, gold medalist(s)	1st place, gold medalist(s)	3rd place, bronze medalist(s)
2021	World Championships		36				
2021	Danish Team Championships	1st place, gold medalist(s)		2nd place, silver medalist(s)		1st place, gold medalist(s)	
2021	Northern European Championships	4	8			4	
2022	Varna Challenge Cup			2nd place, silver medalist(s)			
2022	Danish Championships		1st place, gold medalist(s)				
2022	Nordic Championships	4	2nd place, silver medalist(s)	1st place, gold medalist(s)	3rd place, bronze medalist(s)		3rd place, bronze medalist(s)
2022	European Championships		20	6			
2022	World Championships		29				
2022	Northern European Championships		13	3rd place, bronze medalist(s)			
2023	Doha World Cup			2nd place, silver medalist(s)			
2023	European Championships	22	35	8			
2023	Cairo World Cup			5			
2023	Danish Championships		1st place, gold medalist(s)				
2023	Paris Challenge Cup			5			
2023	World Championships		87				
2024	Cairo World Cup			8			
2024	Cottbus World Cup			9			
2024	European Championships		28	6			
