= 2022 Nordic Artistic Gymnastics Championships =

International gymnastics competition

2022 Nordic Gymnastics Championships
- Location: Kópavogur, Iceland
- Start date: 2 July 2022
- End date: 3 July 2022

The 2022 Nordic Artistic Gymnastics Championships was an artistic gymnastics competition held in Kópavogur, Iceland. The event was held between 2–3 July. The competition featured both senior and junior fields.

== Medalists ==
Event	Gold	Silver	Bronze
Senior Men
Team all-around	Sweden	Norway	Finland
Individual all-around	(Norway) Sofus Heggemsnes	(Sweden) David Rumbutis	(Sweden) Joakim Lenberg
Floor	(Finland) Tarmo Kanerva	(Iceland) Valgard Reinhardsson	(Finland) Akseli Karsikas
Pommel horse	(Norway) Sofus Heggemsnes	(Sweden) David Rumbutis	(Finland) Tarmo Kanerva
Rings	(Norway) Jacob Karlsen	(Norway) Sofus Heggemsnes	(Sweden) Karl Idesjö
Vault	(Norway) Harald Wibye	(Iceland) Valgard Reinhardsson	(Norway) Peder Skogvang
Parallel bars	(Sweden) David Rumbutis	(Norway) Sofus Heggemsnes	(Sweden) Karl Idesjö
Horizontal bar	(Norway) Sofus Heggemsnes	(Finland) Patrick Palmroth	(Sweden) Karl Idesjö
Junior Men
Team all-around	Finland	Sweden	Norway
Individual all-around	(Norway) Sebastian Sponevik	(Finland) Joona Reiman	(Finland) Aaro Harju
Floor	(Norway) Sebastian Sponevik	(Finland) Joona Reiman	(Norway) Petter Steinsvik-Nilsen
Pommel horse	(Norway) Sebastian Sponevik	(Finland) Markus Pietarinen	(Sweden) Jacob Söderqvist
Rings	(Sweden) Luis Il-Sung Melander	(Finland) Markus Pietarinen (Finland) Joona Reiman	N/A
Vault	(Norway) Sebastian Sponevik	(Finland) Joona Reiman	(Norway) Jakob Kvamsøe
Parallel bars	(Norway) Sebastian Sponevik	(Sweden) Luis Il-Sung Melander	(Finland) Aaro Harju
Horizontal bar	(Norway) Sebastian Sponevik	(Finland) Aaro Harju	(Finland) Markus Pietarinen
Senior Women
Team all-around	Sweden	Norway	Iceland
Individual all-around	(Norway) Julie Madsø	(Denmark) Camille Rasmussen	(Norway) Maria Tronrud
Vault	(Denmark) Camille Rasmussen	(Sweden) Malva Wingren	(Finland) Viivi Nieminen
Uneven bars	(Sweden) Nathalie Westlund	(Sweden) Alva Eriksson	(Denmark) Camille Rasmussen
Balance beam	(Iceland) Thelma Adalsteinsdóttir	(Norway) Maria Tronrud	(Iceland) Guðrún Harðardóttir
Floor	(Sweden) Alva Eriksson	(Iceland) Guðrún Harðardóttir	(Denmark) Camille Rasmussen
Junior Women
Team all-around	Denmark	Finland	Norway
Individual all-around	(Norway) Keisha Lockert	(Denmark) Natalie Jensen	(Denmark) Sara Jacobsen
Vault	(Denmark) Sara Jacobsen	(Denmark) Natalie Jensen	(Iceland) Ragnheiður Jóhannsdóttir
Uneven bars	(Sweden) Elina Gravin	(Finland) Ekaterina Podobed	(Finland) Minea Vuorisalo
Balance beam	(Denmark) Natalie Jensen	(Norway) Keisha Lockert	(Norway) Tomine Gadderud
Floor	(Finland) Ekaterina Podobed (Finland) Fanni Varanka (Norway) Keisha Lockert	N/A	
