= 2017 Nordic Junior Artistic Gymnastics Championships =

International gymnastics competition

2017 Junior Nordic Gymnastics Championships
- Location: Oslo, Norway
- Start date: 19 May 2017
- End date: 21 May 2017

The 2017 Nordic Junior Artistic Gymnastics Championships was an artistic gymnastics competition held in Oslo, Norway. The event was held between 19 and 21 May.

== Medalists ==
Event	Gold	Silver	Bronze
Women
Team all-around	(Finland) Finland; Ada Hautala; Emilia Kemppi; Enni Kettunen; Sani Mäkelä; Iida-Maria Vänni	(Norway) Norway; Edel Fosse; Mari Kanter; Sigrid Lello; Julie Madsø; Anne Tingvold	(Sweden) Sweden; Jessica Castles; Tonya Paulsson; Ida Staafgård; Kristina Undheim; Cecilia Wrangdahl
Individual all-around	Enni Kettunen (FIN)	Camille Rasmussen (DEN)	Mari Kanter (NOR)
Vault	Enni Kettunen (FIN)	Sani Mäkelä (FIN)	Camille Rasmussen (DEN)
Uneven bars	Tonya Paulsson (SWE)	Enni Kettunen (FIN)	Iida-Maria Vänni (FIN)
Balance beam	Camille Rasmussen (DEN)	Mari Kanter (NOR)	Anne Tingvold (NOR)
Floor	Jessica Castles (SWE)	Camille Rasmussen (DEN)	Margrét Kristinsdóttir (ISL)
