= Ada Hautala =

Finnish artistic gymnast

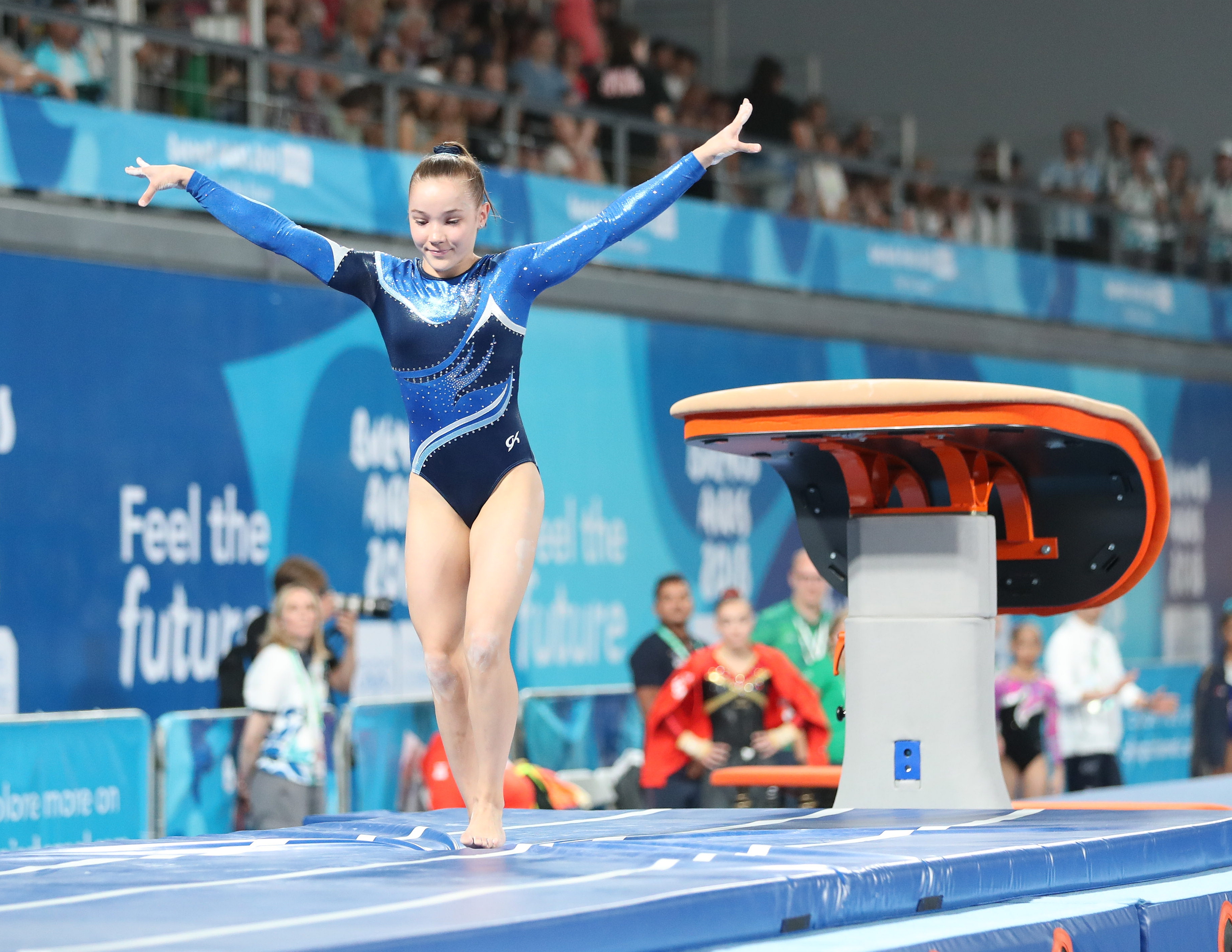
- Hautala at the 2018 Youth Olympic Games

Personal information
- Full name: Ada Hautala
- Born: 14 October 2003 (age 23) Liminka, Finland

Gymnastics career
- Discipline: Women's artistic gymnastics
- Country represented: Finland; (2016–present)
- Club: Oulun Pyrinto
- Head coach: Pauliina Savola

Ada Hautala (born 14 October 2003) is a Finnish artistic gymnast. She represented Finland at the 2018 Youth Olympic Games and is the 2019 Finnish national champion.

== Early life ==
Hautala was born in Liminka, Finland. She began training in gymnastics in 2010.

== Junior gymnastics career ==
=== 2016–17 ===
Hautala competed at the 2016 Finnish national championships where she placed tenth in the all-around but first on balance beam. She later competed at the Mälarcupen where she placed tenth.

In 2017 Hautala won her first junior national title at the Finnish national championships. She next competed at the Nordic Championships where she helped Finland finish first as a team and individually placed tenth. At the 2017 European Youth Olympic Festival Hautala helped Finland place 13th.

=== 2018 ===
Hautala competed at the Finnish National Championships where she placed second in the all-around and on vault behind Nitta Nieminen and placed first on the other three apparatuses. She next competed at the Youth Olympic Games Qualifier where she placed 20th. In doing so she qualified a spot for Finland. Hautala competed at the European Championships and finished 32nd in qualifications. Hautala was selected to represent Finland at the 2018 Youth Olympic Games. While there she finished ninth in the all-around and was second reserve for the balance beam final.

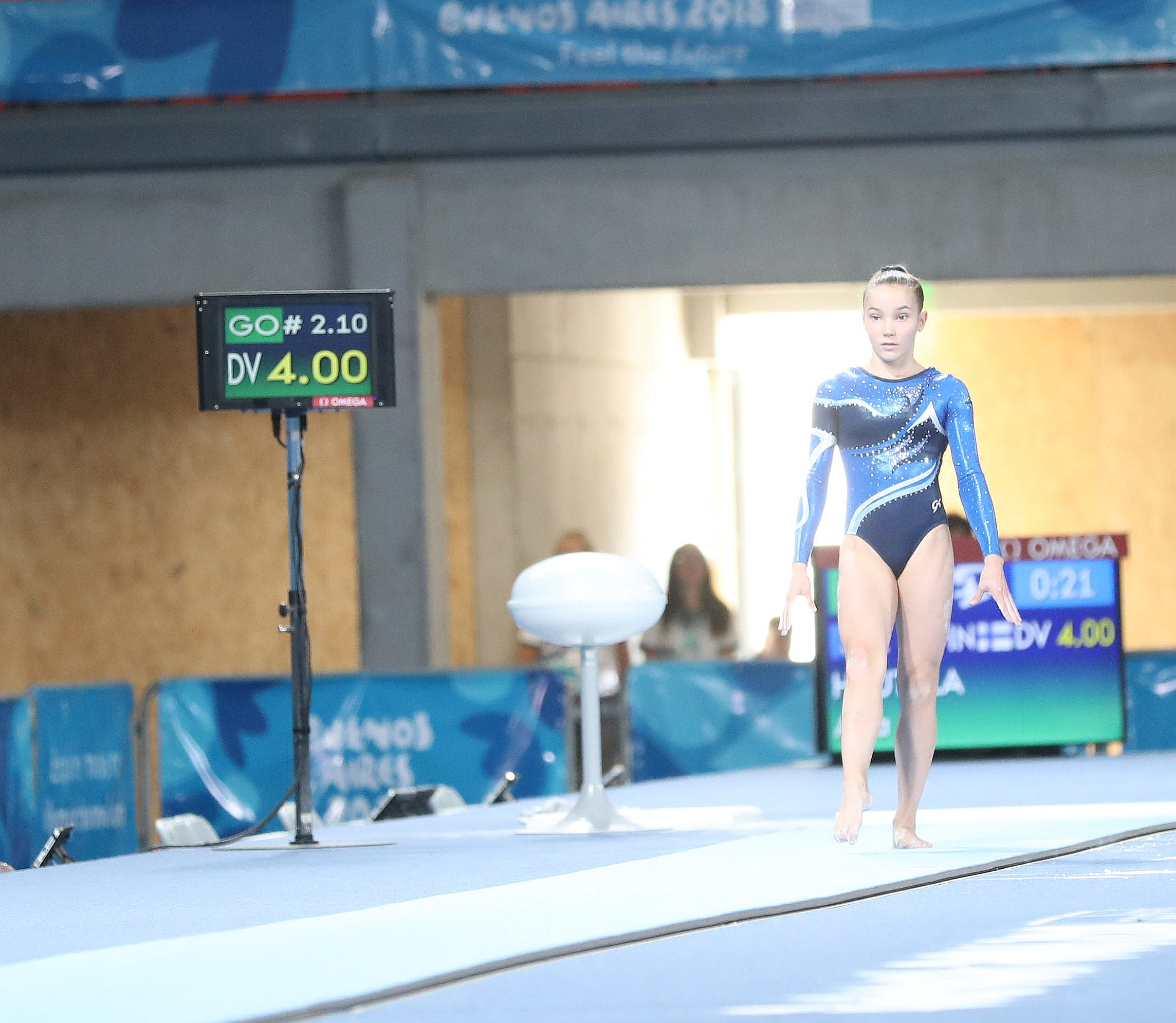
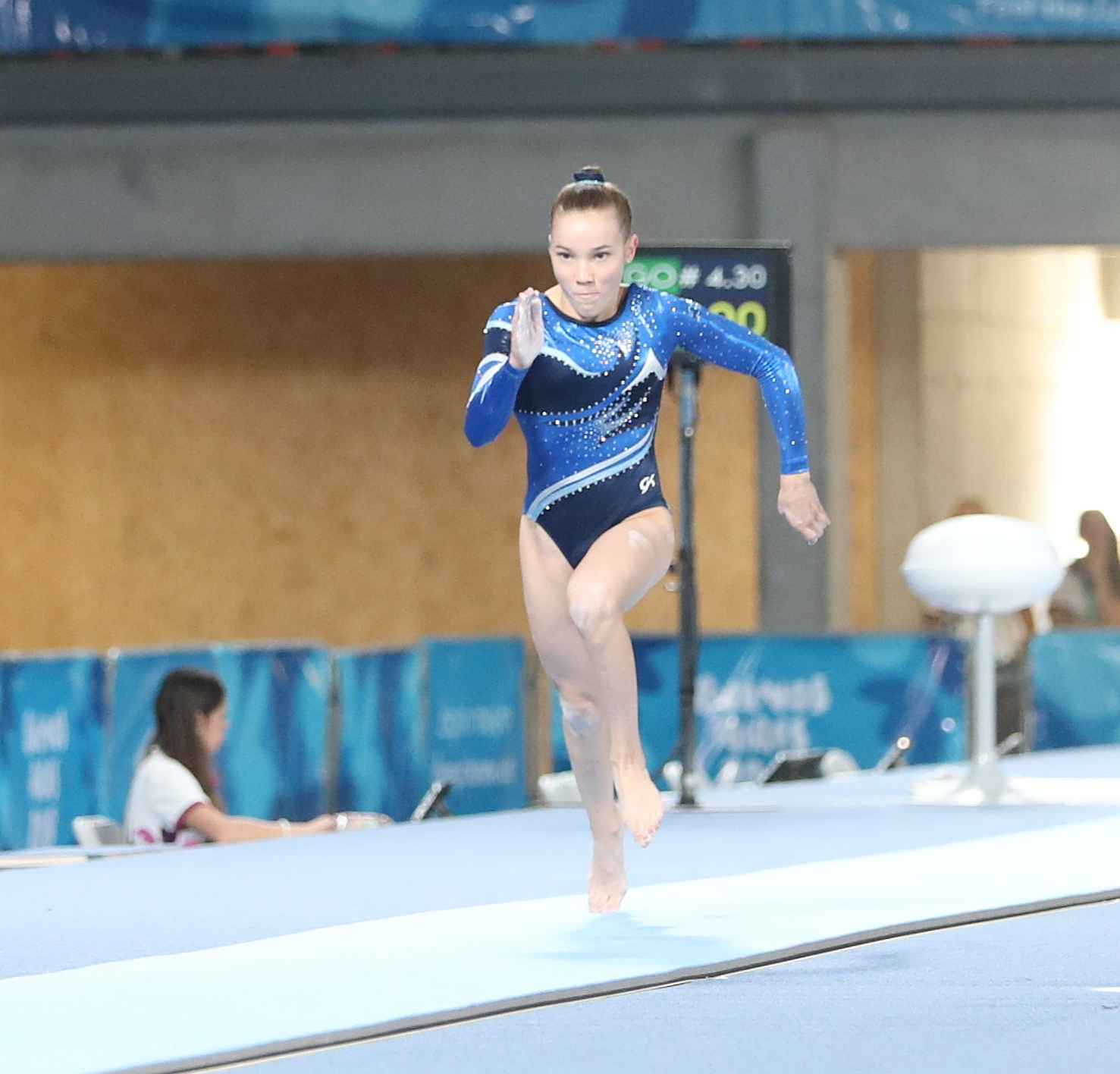
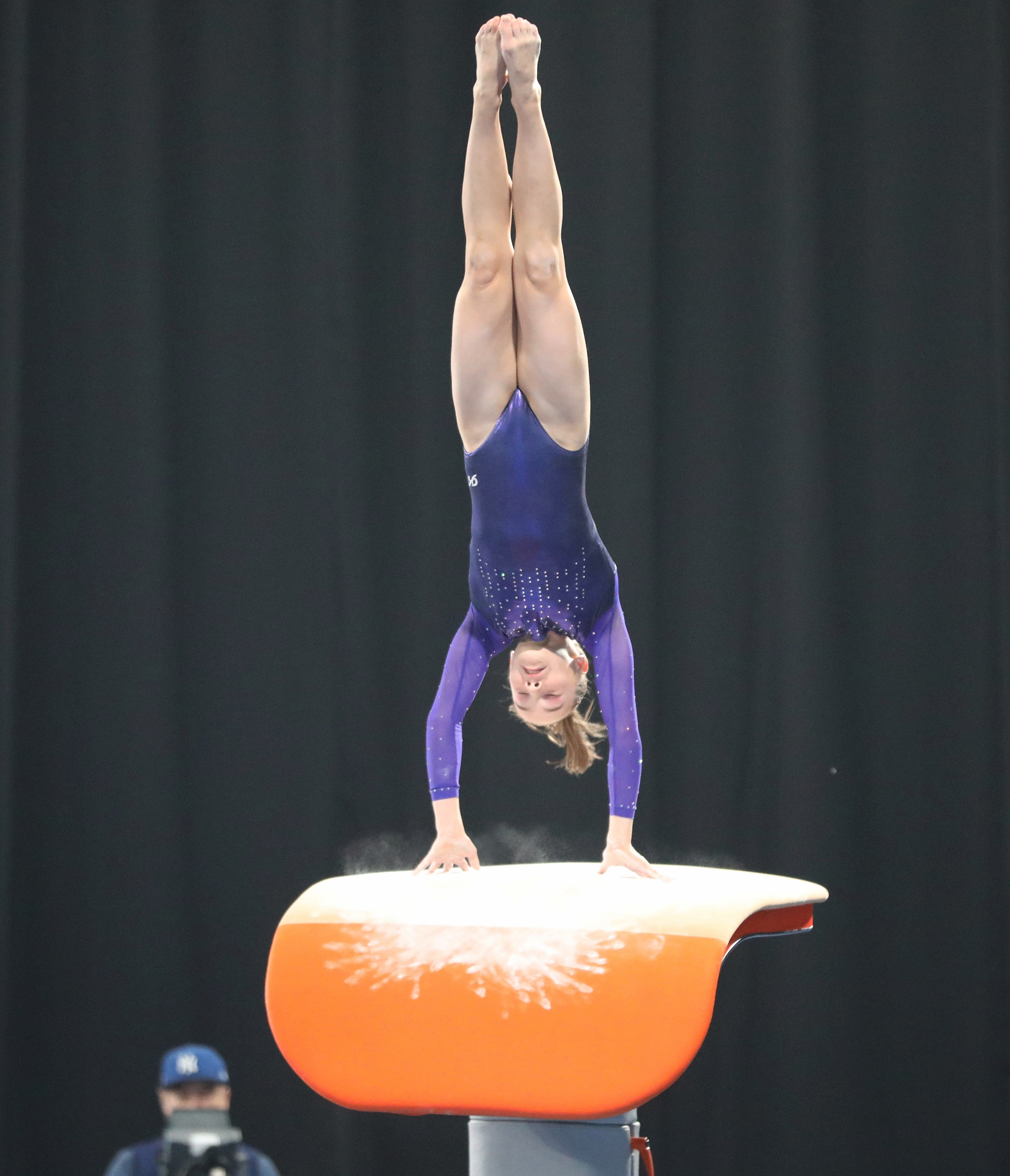
Hautala at the 2018 Youth Olympic Games

== Senior gymnastics career ==
=== 2019–20 ===
Hautala turned senior in 2019. She competed at the European Championships and finished 41st in qualifications. She won the senior national title at the Finnish Championships. Hautala competed at the Koper Challenge Cup where she finished seventh and sixth on balance beam and floor exercise respectively.

The mass majority of competitions in 2020 were either canceled or postponed due to the global COVID-19 pandemic. In November Hautala competed at the Finnish Championships where she placed second behind Enni Kettunen. Additionally she placed first on balance beam and floor exercise.

=== 2021 ===
Hautala at the 2021 European Championships where she qualified to the all-around final. During the final she placed twenty-first. At the Finnish national championships she placed fifth. Hautala was selected to represent Finland at the World Championships alongside Maisa Kuusikko and Rosanna Ojala. During qualifications she finished 27th in the all-around and was the third reserve for the final.

== Competitive history ==
Competitive history of Ada Hautala at the junior level
Year	Event	Team	AA	VT	UB	BB	FX
2016	Finnish Championships		10			1st place, gold medalist(s)	
2016	Mälarcupen		10				
2017	Finnish Championships		1st place, gold medalist(s)	3rd place, bronze medalist(s)	5	5	3rd place, bronze medalist(s)
2017	Nordic Championships	1st place, gold medalist(s)	10				
2017	FinGym Turku					4	
2017	Euro Youth Olympic Festival	13	43				
2017	Mälarcupen		5	1st place, gold medalist(s)		2nd place, silver medalist(s)	
2018	Finnish Championships		2nd place, silver medalist(s)	2nd place, silver medalist(s)	1st place, gold medalist(s)	1st place, gold medalist(s)	1st place, gold medalist(s)
2018	Youth Olympic Qualifier		20				
2018	European Championships		32				
2018	Youth Olympic Games		9			R2	

Competitive history of Ada Hautala at the senior level
Year	Event	Team	AA	VT	UB	BB	FX
2019
2019	European Championships		41				
2019	Finnish Championships		1st place, gold medalist(s)	3rd place, bronze medalist(s)	2nd place, silver medalist(s)	2nd place, silver medalist(s)	1st place, gold medalist(s)
2019	Koper Challenge Cup					7	6
2020	Finnish Team Championships	2nd place, silver medalist(s)	1st place, gold medalist(s)				
2020	Finnish Championships		2nd place, silver medalist(s)			1st place, gold medalist(s)	1st place, gold medalist(s)
2021
2021	European Championships		21				
2021	Finnish World Trials		2nd place, silver medalist(s)				
2021	Finnish Championships		5		5		4
2021	World Championships		R3				
2022	Szombathely Challenge Cup					7	4
2022	World Championships	16					
2023
2023	European Championships	11					
2023	World Championships	22					
2025
2025	European Championships	11					
2025	World University Games	12	10				
2025	World Championships		59				
2026
2026	European Championships	21					
