= Jessica Castles =

Swedish artistic gymnast

- Full name: Jessica Matilda Kristina Castles
- Born: 16 July 2002 (age 24) West Surrey, England
- Height: 5 ft 3 in (160 cm)

Gymnastics career
- Discipline: Women's artistic gymnastics
- Country represented: Sweden; (2017–2021)
- College team: Arizona Wildcats (2021–24)
- Club: Eskilstuna Gymnastikforening (SWE); Heathrow Gymnastics Club (UK)
- Head coach: Michele Walduck
Medal record
Women's artistic gymnastics
Representing Sweden
European Games
Bronze medal – third place	2019 Minsk	Floor Exercise

Jessica Castles (born 16 July 2002) is a British-born Swedish artistic gymnast who represented Sweden in international competitions. She is the 2019 European Games floor exercise bronze medalist and the 2018 Swedish national champion. She competed in collegiate gymnastics at the University of Arizona from 2021 to 2024.

== Early life ==
Castles was born in West Surrey, England in 2002 to a Northern Irish father and a Swedish mother. She has two younger brothers. She grew up in Qatar, having lived there for nine years before moving back to England at age 14 in order to get better gymnastics training and coaching.

== Junior gymnastics career ==
Castles trained gymnastics recreationally before she was scouted by the Qatari national team when she was twelve years old. She trained with them for two years before continuing her training in England with Heathrow Gymnastics Club.

=== 2016–17 ===
Castles competed at the 2016 English Championships where she placed 35th in the all-around. In 2017 Castles began competing at both British and Swedish domestic competitions and decided to represent Sweden in international competitions. In April she competed at the English Championships where she placed 11th in the all-around but recorded the second highest floor exercise score amongst juniors. The following month she competed at a team selection competition for the 2017 Junior Nordic Championships where she placed second in the all-around behind Tonya Paulsson but recorded the highest floor exercise score. At the Junior Nordic Championships Castles helped Sweden finish in third place. Individually she finished ninth in the all-around and won gold on floor exercise ahead of Camille Rasmussen of Denmark. In June she competed at the Flanders International Team Challenge where she helped Sweden finish ninth as a team, and individually she placed 18th in the all-around.

In late June Castles competed at her first Swedish National Championships where she won bronze in the all-around behind Ida Staafgård and Paulsson, gold on vault and floor exercise, and silver on balance beam behind Staafgård. She next represented Sweden at the European Youth Olympic Festival where she helped Sweden finish 20th as a team. Castles next competed at the Rushmoor Rosebowl where she placed seventh in the all-around and second on floor exercise behind Emily Thomas. She ended the season competing at the Top Gym Tournament where she finished sixth in the all-around, first on balance beam, and second on floor exercise behind Amelie Morgan.

== Senior gymnastics career ==
=== 2018 ===
Castles turned senior in 2018. She competed at the British Championships as a guest and finished in fourth place amongst the other guests. In June Castles competed at the Nordic Championships where she helped Sweden finish second behind Norway. Individually she won gold in the all-around, on balance beam, and on floor exercise. She next competed at the Swedish National Championships where she placed first in the all-around, on balance beam, and on floor exercise. Castles was selected to represent Sweden at the European Championships. While there she qualified to the floor exercise final where she finished seventh. She next competed at the Paris Challenge Cup where she qualified to the balance beam final and finished in seventh place. Castles was selected to represent Sweden at the 2018 World Championships in Doha. During qualifications she finished 47th in the all-around and 39th on floor exercise; she did not qualify for any event finals.

=== 2019 ===
Castles competed at the English Championships as a guest where she won silver in the all-around behind club teammate and Jamaica national team member Danusia Francis. She next competed at the British Championships and won gold in the all-around. Castles was once again selected to represent Sweden at the European Championships; she finished 14th in the all-around. She next competed at the European Games. During qualifications she finished 24th in the all-around and did not qualify for the final; however she qualified to the floor exercise final in third place. During event finals she matched her placement and won the bronze behind Anastasia Bachynska of Ukraine and Aneta Holasová of the Czech Republic.

In September Castles competed at the British Team Championships where she placed fourth in the non-squad division. Castles was selected to represent Sweden at the 2019 World Championships in Stuttgart. During qualifications she finished 89th in the all-around and did not qualify for the finals, nor did she qualify as an individual to the 2020 Olympic Games due to compatriot Jonna Adlerteg placing higher than her.

== Collegiate gymnastics career ==
Castles announced that she would compete in NCAA gymnastics with the Arizona Wildcats, starting in the 2020–21 school year.

Castles made her NCAA debut on 23 January 2021 in a meet against Utah. She contributed scores on balance beam and floor exercise. Her 9.90 on balance beam was the highest score on the apparatus, tied with Maile O'Keefe. Post season she was named Arizona's Freshman of the Year.

== Competitive history ==
Competitive history of Jessica Castles
Year	Event	Team	AA	VT	UB	BB	FX
2016	Junior English Championships		35				
2017	Junior English Championships		11				
2017	Nordic Championships	3rd place, bronze medalist(s)	9				1st place, gold medalist(s)
2017	FIT Team Challenge	9	18				
2017	Swedish Championships		3rd place, bronze medalist(s)	1st place, gold medalist(s)		2nd place, silver medalist(s)	1st place, gold medalist(s)
2017	European Youth Olympic Festival	20					
2017	Rushmoor Rosebowl		7				2nd place, silver medalist(s)
2017	Top Gym Tournament	10	6			1st place, gold medalist(s)	2nd place, silver medalist(s)
2018	Nordic Championships	2nd place, silver medalist(s)	1st place, gold medalist(s)			1st place, gold medalist(s)	1st place, gold medalist(s)
2018	Swedish Championships		1st place, gold medalist(s)			1st place, gold medalist(s)	1st place, gold medalist(s)
2018	European Championships						7
2018	Paris Challenge Cup					7	
2019	English Championships (guest)		2nd place, silver medalist(s)				
2019	British Championships (guest)		1st place, gold medalist(s)				
2019	European Championships		14				
2019	European Games						3rd place, bronze medalist(s)
2019	British Team Championships (non-squad)		4				
