= Maisa Kuusikko =

Finnish artistic gymnast

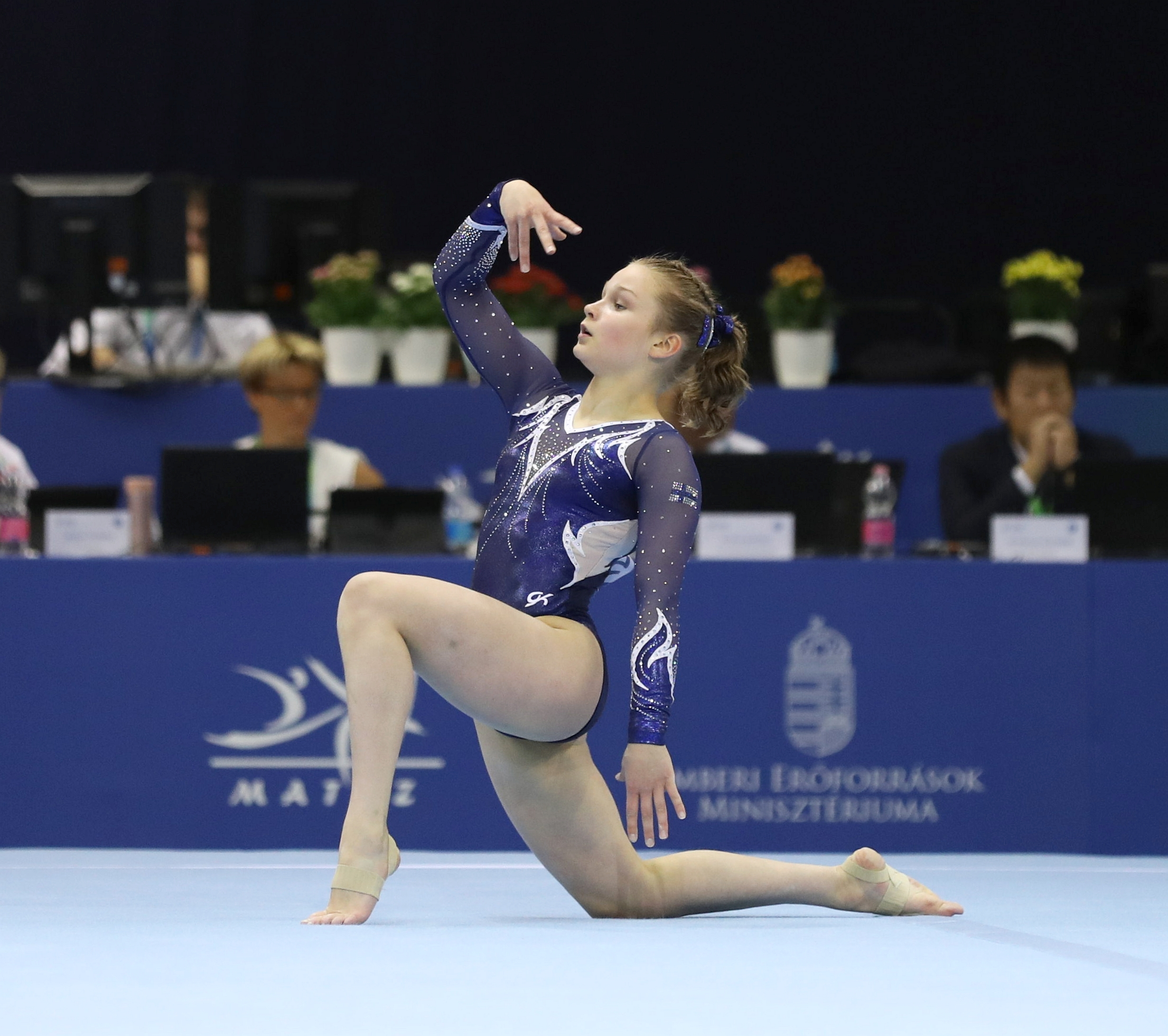
- Kuusikko at the 2019 Junior World Championships

Personal information
- Full name: Maisa Kuusikko
- Born: 16 June 2005 (age 21) Tampere, Pirkanmaa, Finland

Gymnastics career
- Discipline: Women's artistic gymnastics
- Country represented: Finland; (2018–present)
- Club: Tampereen Voimistelijoiden
- Head coach: Igor Cherepov
Medal record
Women's artistic gymnastics
Representing Finland
FIG World Cup
Event	1st	2nd	3rd
Apparatus World Cup	0	1	0
World Challenge Cup	1	1	1
Total	1	2	1

Maisa Kuusikko (born 16 June 2005) is a Finnish artistic gymnast. She represented Finland at the inaugural junior World Championships. She is the 2021 Finnish national champion and a two-time junior national champion. At the 2022 World Championships Kuusikko made history by becoming the first Finnish gymnast to qualify to the all-around final.

== Early life ==
Kuusikko was born in Tampere, Finland. She began training in gymnastics in 2011.

== Junior gymnastics career ==
=== 2018 ===
Kuusikko competed at the Finnish National Championships where she placed third in the all-around and second on uneven bars. She made her international debut at the 2018 Nordic Championships where she helped Finland place third. Individually she placed eighth in the all-around and second on uneven bars behind Tonya Paulsson.

=== 2019 ===
Kuusikko competed at the Stella Zakharova Cup where she won a pair of bronze on vault and uneven bars. At the Nordic Championships she helped Finland place first. Individually she placed second in the all-around behind Camille Rasmussen but won gold on vault and balance beam. She won the junior national title at the Finnish Championships and was named to the team to compete at the inaugural Junior World Championships alongside Ilona Kossila and Malla Montell. Kuusikko finished 39th in the all-around and was the highest placing Finnish gymnast. In December she competed at the Voronin Cup where she placed fifth in the all-around, third on vault, second on uneven bars and balance beam, and sixth on floor exercise.

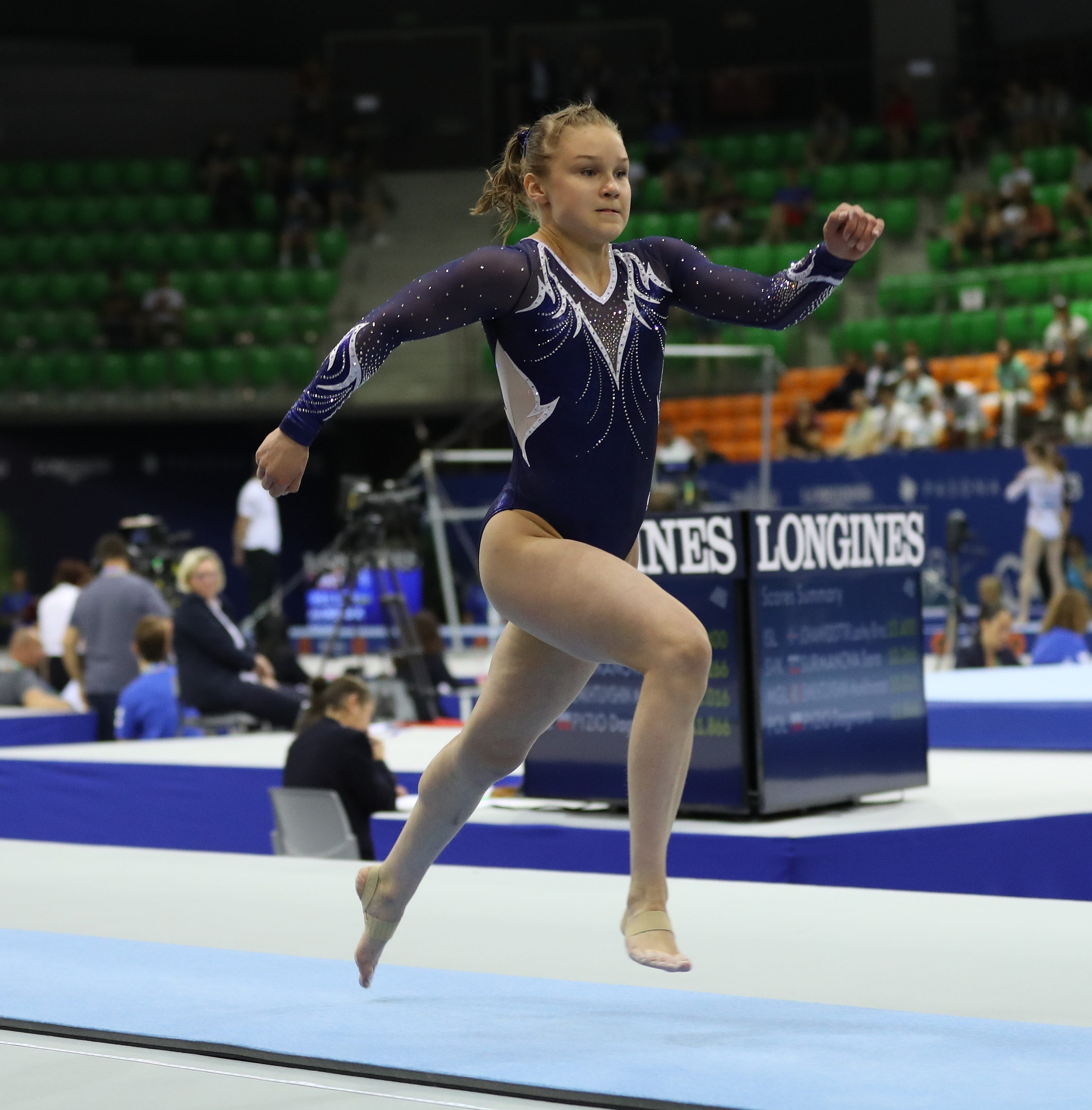
Vault

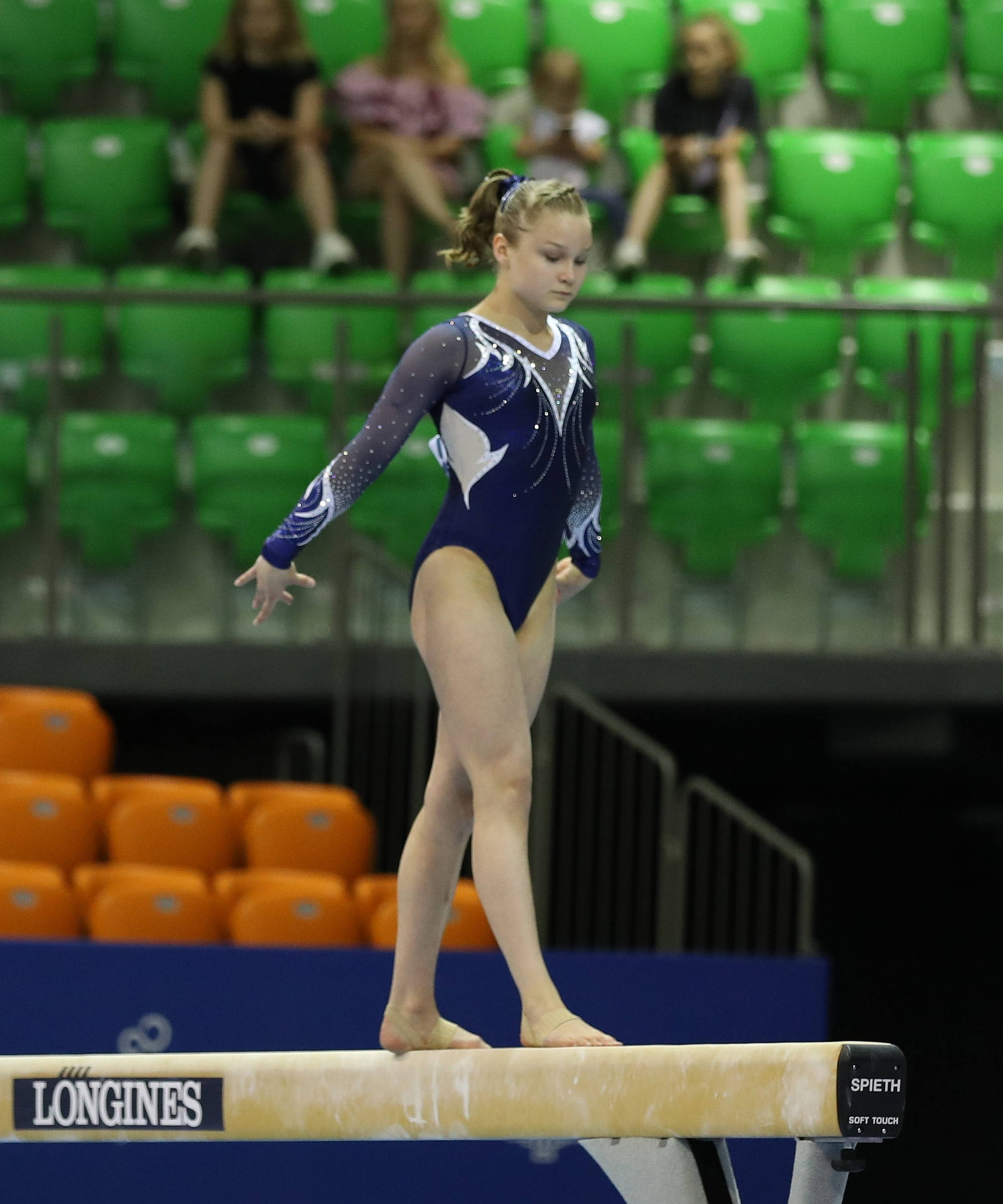
Balance Beam

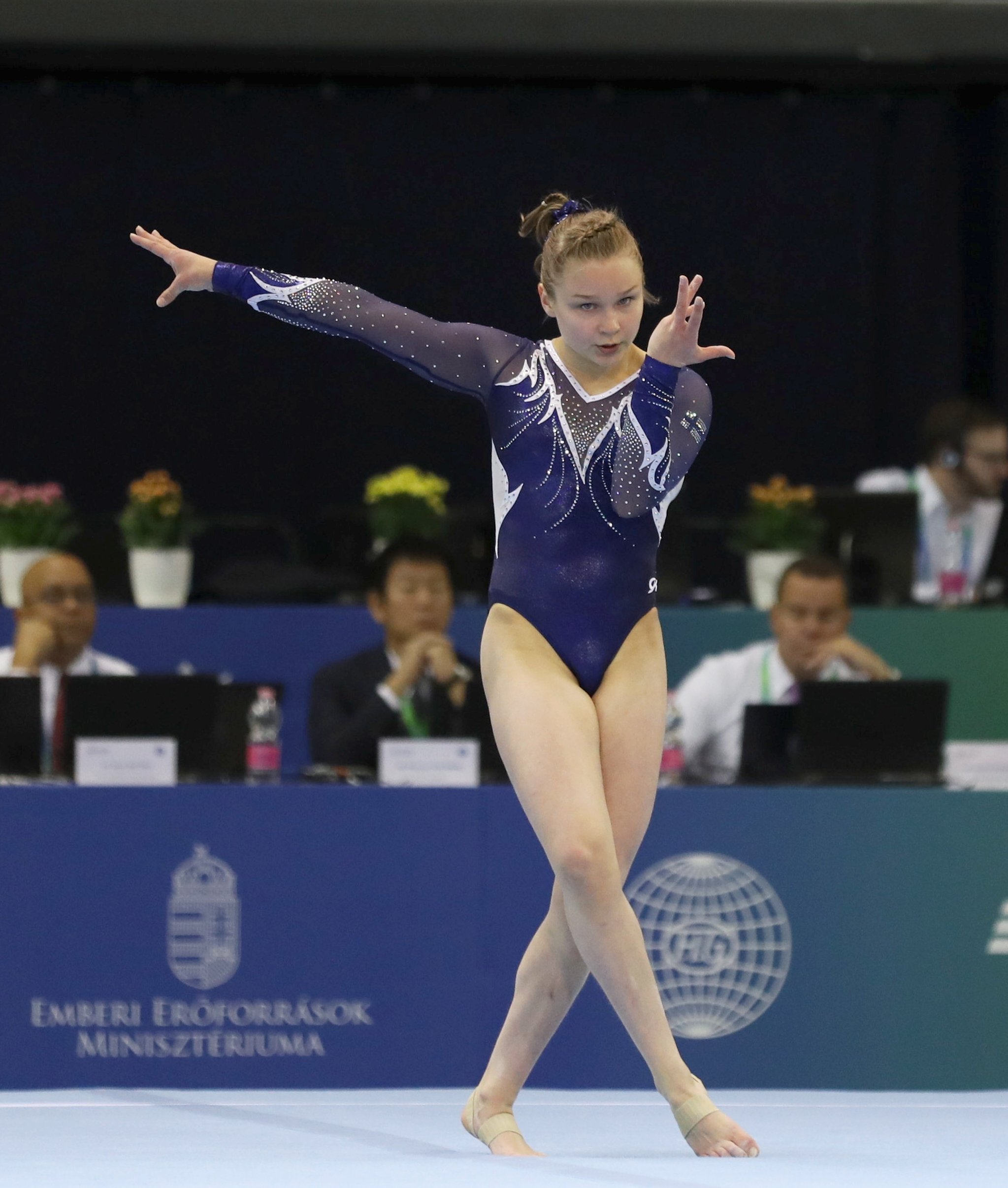
Floor Exercise

Kuusikko at the 2019 Junior World Championships

=== 2020 ===
The mass majority of competitions in 2020 were either canceled or postponed due to the global COVID-19 pandemic. In November Kuusikko competed at the Finnish Championships where she defended her junior national title. Additionally she won gold on vault, uneven bars, and balance beam and placed second on floor exercise behind Olivia Vättö.

== Senior gymnastics career ==
=== 2021 ===
Kuusikko turned senior in 2021. She made her senior international debut at the 2021 European Championships where she qualified to the all-around final. During the final she placed thirteenth. In September she competed at the Finnish Championships and won her first senior national title. Additionally she won the uneven bars and balance beam titles and placed second on vault behind Kaia Tanskanen. Kuusikko was selected to represent Finland at the World Championships alongside Ada Hautala and Rosanna Ojala.

=== 2022 ===
Kuusikko competed at the Baku World Cup where she placed fifth on vault and floor exercise. She next competed at the Varna Challenge Cup where she won silver on balance beam behind Ana Đerek, bronze on vault behind Aline Friess and Camille Rasmussen, and eighth on uneven bars.

Kuusikko later represented Finland at the 2022 World Championships in Liverpool, England, contributing to the Finnish team's 16th-place finish during qualifications. She advanced to the individual all-around final in 29th place, becoming the first Finnish gymnast to do so in World Championships history. During the all-around final Kuusikko finished thirteenth.

=== 2023 ===
In September Kuusikko sustained a knee injury and was unable to compete at the 2023 World Championships.

== Competitive history ==
Competitive history of Maisa Kuusikko at the junior level
Year	Event	Team	AA	VT	UB	BB	FX
2018	Finnish Championships		3rd place, bronze medalist(s)		2nd place, silver medalist(s)	7	7
2018	Nordic Championships	3rd place, bronze medalist(s)	8		2nd place, silver medalist(s)		
2019	Stella Zakharova Cup	4	5	3rd place, bronze medalist(s)	3rd place, bronze medalist(s)		4
2019	Nordic Championships	1st place, gold medalist(s)	2nd place, silver medalist(s)	1st place, gold medalist(s)	2nd place, silver medalist(s)	1st place, gold medalist(s)	
2019	Finnish Championships		1st place, gold medalist(s)	1st place, gold medalist(s)	1st place, gold medalist(s)	7	6
2019	Junior World Championships	26	39				
2019	Voronin Cup		5	3rd place, bronze medalist(s)	2nd place, silver medalist(s)	2nd place, silver medalist(s)	6
2020	Finnish Championships		1st place, gold medalist(s)	1st place, gold medalist(s)	1st place, gold medalist(s)	1st place, gold medalist(s)	2nd place, silver medalist(s)

Competitive history of Maisa Kuusikko at the senior level
Year	Event	Team	AA	VT	UB	BB	FX
2021
2021	European Championships		13				
2021	Finnish World Trials		1st place, gold medalist(s)				
2021	Finnish Championships		1st place, gold medalist(s)	2nd place, silver medalist(s)	1st place, gold medalist(s)	1st place, gold medalist(s)	8
2022	Baku World Cup			5			5
2022	Varna Challenge Cup			3rd place, bronze medalist(s)	8	2nd place, silver medalist(s)	
2022	European Championships		11				
2022	Szombathely Challenge Cup			6	6	1st place, gold medalist(s)	
2022	World Championships	16	13				
2023
2023	European Championships	11	15				
2024	Baku World Cup				5		
2025	Osijek World Cup				2nd place, silver medalist(s)	6	
2025	European Championships	11			4		
2025	World Championships				18		
