= 2019 Nordic Junior Artistic Gymnastics Championships =

International gymnastics competition

2019 Junior Nordic Gymnastics Championships
- Location: Halmstad (MAG) and Västerås (WAG), Sweden
- Start date: 18 May 2019
- End date: 19 May 2019

The 2019 Nordic Junior Artistic Gymnastics Championships was an artistic gymnastics competition held in Sweden. The event was held between 18–19 May. The men's competition took place in Halmstad while the women's competition took place in Västerås.

== Medalists ==
| Event | Gold | Silver | Bronze |
|---|---|---|---|
Men
| Individual all-around | Theodor Gadderud (NOR) | Jacob Karlsen (NOR) | Mattias Larsson (SWE) |
| Floor | Didrik Gundersen (NOR) | Akseli Karsikas (FIN) | Jacob Karlsen (NOR) |
| Pommel horse | Mattias Larsson (SWE) Anton Jääskeläinen (FIN) | —N/a | Dagur Olafsson (ISL) |
| Rings | Theodor Gadderud (NOR) | Jacob Karlsen (NOR) | Mattias Larsson (SWE) |
| Vault | Jacob Karlsen (NOR) | Jonas Thorisson (ISL) Martin Gudmundsson (ISL) | —N/a |
| Parallel bars | Theodor Gadderud (NOR) | Viktor Javenfeldt (SWE) | Joar Amblie (NOR) |
| Horizontal bar | Theodor Gadderud (NOR) | Akseli Karsikas (FIN) | Viktor Javenfeldt (SWE) |
Women
| Team all-around | (Finland) Finland; Misella Antila; Ilona Kossila; Maisa Kuusikko; Malla Montell; Anni Vuorikoski | (Norway) Norway; Jenny Håkegård; Selma Karlsen; Julie Madsø; Marie Rønbeck; Mina Sørensen | (Sweden) Sweden; Kristina Åhlin; Emelie Westlund; Nathalie Westlund; Jennifer Williams; Malva Wingre |
| Individual all-around | Camille Rasmussen (DEN) | Maisa Kuusikko (FIN) | Jennifer Williams (SWE) |
| Vault | Maisa Kuusikko (FIN) | Camille Rasmussen (DEN) | Malla Montell (FIN) |
| Uneven bars | Jennifer Williams (SWE) | Maisa Kuusikko (FIN) | Anni Vuorikoski (FIN) |
| Balance beam | Maisa Kuusikko (FIN) | Julie Madsø (NOR) | Camille Rasmussen (DEN) |
| Floor | Jennifer Williams (SWE) | Camille Rasmussen (DEN) | Freja Petersen (DEN) |
