= 2018 Nordic Artistic Gymnastics Championships =

2018 Artistic Gymnastic Competition held in Denmark

2018 Nordic Gymnastics Championships
- Location: Farum, Denmark
- Start date: 29 June 2018
- End date: 1 July 2018

The 2018 Nordic Artistic Gymnastics Championships was an artistic gymnastics competition held in Farum, Denmark. The event was held between 29 June and 1 July. The competition featured both senior and junior fields.

== Medalists ==
Event	Gold	Silver	Bronze
Senior Men
Team all-around	(Norway) Norway; Sofus Heggemsnes; Odin Kalvø; Stian Skjerahaug; Henrik Stiansen; Harald Wibye	(Finland) Finland; Franz Card; Oskar Kirmes; Elias Koski; Joonas Kukkonen; Patrick Palmroth	(Sweden) Sweden; Tony Do; Karl Idesjö; Filip Lidbeck; Henrik Schröder; Kim Vanström
Individual all-around	Oskar Kirmes (FIN)	Sofus Heggemsnes (NOR)	Stian Skjerahaug (NOR)
Floor	Stian Skjerahaug (NOR)	Oskar Kirmes (FIN)	Sofus Heggemsnes (NOR)
Pommel horse	Elias Koski (FIN)	Sofus Heggemsnes (NOR)	Oskar Kirmes (FIN)
Rings	Odin Kalvø (NOR)	Elias Koski (FIN)	Karl Idesjö (SWE)
Vault	Harald Wibye (NOR)	Filip Lidbeck (SWE)	Eythor Baldursson (ISL)
Parallel bars	Elias Koski (FIN)	Valgard Reinhardsson (ISL)	Stian Skjerahaug (NOR)
Horizontal bar	Franz Card (FIN)	Stian Skjerahaug (NOR)	Jacob Buus (DEN)
Junior Men
Team all-around	(Sweden) Sweden; Victor Javenfeldt; Joakim Lenberg; Luis Melander; David Rumbutis; Marcus Stenberg	(Norway) Norway; Fredrik Aas; Thodor Gadderud; Didrik Gundersen; Jacob Karlsen; Magnus Nygaard-Damm	(Finland) Finland; Anton Jääskeläinen; Ilari Latikka; Eeli Mikkola; Antti Varjolaakso; Isak Wargh
Individual all-around	David Rumbutis (SWE)	Marcus Stenberg (SWE)	Martin Gudmundsson (ISL)
Floor	Marcus Stenberg (SWE)	Didrik Gundersen (NOR)	Martin Gudmundsson (ISL)
Pommel horse	David Rumbutis (SWE)	Anton Jääskeläinen (FIN)	Magnus Nygaard-Damm (NOR)
Rings	Jacob Karlsen (NOR)	Thodor Gadderud (NOR)	Luis Melander (SWE)
Vault	David Rumbutis (SWE)	Jonas Thorisson (ISL)	Martin Gudmundsson (ISL)
Parallel bars	Jacob Karlsen (NOR)	Thodor Gadderud (NOR)	David Rumbutis (SWE)
Horizontal bar	David Rumbutis (SWE)	Marcus Stenberg (SWE)	Martin Gudmundsson (ISL)
Senior Women
Team all-around	(Norway) Norway; Sara Davidsen; Edel Fosse; Thea Nygaard; Julie Søderstrøm; Juliane Tøssebro	(Sweden) Sweden; Jonna Adlerteg; Agnes Åkerman; Jessica Castles; Alva Eriksson; Marcela Torres	(Finland) Finland; Enni Kettunen; Maija Leinonen; Sani Mäkelä; Helmi Murto; Siiri Saukkonen
Individual all-around	Jessica Castles (SWE)	Thea Nygaard (NOR)	Mette Hulgaard (DEN) Sara Davidsen (NOR)
Vault	Sani Mäkelä (FIN)	Agnes Suto-Tuuha (ISL)	Enni Kettunen (FIN)
Uneven bars	Jonna Adlerteg (SWE)	Thea Nygaard (NOR)	Maija Leinonen (FIN)
Balance beam	Jessica Castles (SWE)	Julie Søderstrøm (NOR)	Maija Leinonen (FIN)
Floor	Jessica Castles (SWE)	Helmi Murto (FIN)	Juliane Tøssebro (NOR)
Junior Women
Team all-around	(Norway) Norway; Selma Halvorsen; Mari Kanter; Aino Namtvedt; Åsne Øyulvstad; Marie Rønbeck	(Sweden) Sweden; Tonya Paulsson; Izabella Trejo; Nathalie Westlund; Jennifer Williams; Cecilia Wrangdahl	(Finland) Finland; Iida Haapala; Saara Kokko; Maisa Kuusikko; Sara Loikas; Nitta Nieminen
Individual all-around	Mari Kanter (NOR)	Tonya Paulsson (SWE)	Camille Rasmussen (DEN)
Vault	Izabella Trejo (SWE)	Vigdis Palmadottir (ISL)	Aino Namtvedt (NOR)
Uneven bars	Tonya Paulsson (SWE)	Maisa Kuusikko (FIN)	Camille Rasmussen (DEN)
Balance beam	Jennifer Williams (SWE)	Mari Kanter (NOR)	Saara Kokko (FIN)
Floor	Camille Rasmussen (DEN)	Mari Kanter (NOR)	Tonya Paulsson (SWE)
