= Gymnastics at the 2019 European Games – Women's floor exercise =

The women's artistic gymnastics floor final at the 2019 European Games was held at the Minsk Arena on June 30.

== Qualification ==
Qualification took place on June 27. Denisa Golgotă from Romania qualified in first, followed by Ukraine's Anastasia Bachynska and Jessica Castles of Sweden.

The reserves were:

1. Angelina Melnikova (RUS)
2. Georgia-Mae Fenton (GBR)
3. Naomi Visser (NED)

== Medalists ==
	Gold	Silver	Bronze
Floor exercise	Anastasia Bachynska (UKR)	Aneta Holasová (CZE)	Jessica Castles (SWE)

== Results ==
Oldest and youngest competitors

	Name	Country	Date of birth	Age
Youngest	Anastasiya Alistratava	Belarus	October 16, 2003	15 years, 8 months and 14 days
Oldest	Adela Šajn	Slovenia	April 14, 1990	29 years, 2 months and 16 days

Rank	Gymnast	D Score	E Score	Pen.	Total
1st place, gold medalist(s)	Anastasia Bachynska (UKR)	5.100	8.100		13.200
2nd place, silver medalist(s)	Aneta Holasová (CZE)	4.900	8.066		12.966
3rd place, bronze medalist(s)	Jessica Castles (SWE)	4.900	8.033		12.933
4	Anastasiya Alistratava (BLR)	4.900	8.000		12.900
5	Adela Šajn (SLO)	4.700	7.966		12.666
6	Denisa Golgotă (ROU)	5.600	7.000	0.300	12.300
