= Aneta Holasová =

Czech artistic gymnast

- Born: 22 February 2001 (age 25) Prague, Czech Republic

Gymnastics career
- Discipline: Women's artistic gymnastics
- Country represented: Czech Republic; (2014–present)
- Club: TJ Bohemians Praha
- Head coach: Jiří Fiřt
Medal record
Women's artistic gymnastics
Representing Czech Republic
European Games
Silver medal – second place	2019 Minsk	Floor Exercise
FIG World Cup
Event	1st	2nd	3rd
World Challenge Cup	0	0	3
Total	0	0	3

Aneta Holasová (born 22 February 2001) is a Czech artistic gymnast. She is the 2019 European Games silver medalist on the floor exercise and a three-time FIG World Cup bronze medalist. At the 2019 World Championships, she finished fifty-first in the all-around and qualified an individual spot for the 2020 Olympic Games. She represented the Czech Republic at the 2020 Summer Olympics and placed seventy-third in the all-around.

== Personal life ==
Holasová was born on 22 February 2001 in Prague. She began gymnastics when she was four years old. Her other hobbies include swimming, cycling, skiing, and skating.

== Junior gymnastics career ==
Holasová made her international debut at the 2013 Zelena Jama Open in Ljubljana, and she won the team bronze medal with her club team and the silver medal in the all-around. At the 2014 Gym Festival Trnava, she won the silver medal in the team event and in the all-around behind Russian gymnast Angelina Simakova. She then competed at the 2014 Top Gym Tournament in Ghent where she finished ninth in the all-around. She helped her team finish fifth, and she finished eighth in the vault final, twelfth in the balance beam final, and eighth on the floor exercise.

At the 2015 Gym Festival Trnava, Holasová won the silver medal in the all-around behind Barbora Mokošová. She also won a silver medal in the vault final, placed fourth on the floor exercise, and won the gold medal on the balance beam. She then competed at the 2015 European Youth Summer Olympic Festival and helped the Czech team finish twelfth. Individually, she qualified for the all-around final where she finished nineteenth. Then at the 2015 Olympic Hopes Cup, she won the bronze medal with the Czech team and placed twelfth in the all-around.

At a 2016 friendly meet against Austria, Israel, Poland, and Slovakia, Holasová helped her team win the gold medal and she won the gold medal in the all-around. She then competed as a guest at the 2016 Polish Championships where she won the gold medal in the all-around. Then at the 2016 Gym Festival Trnava, she won the gold medal in the all-around, on vault, and on floor exercise, and she won the silver medal on the balance beam. She was supposed to compete at the 2016 European Junior Championships, but during the warmups, she injured her knee.

== Senior gymnastics career ==
=== 2017 ===
Holasová returned to competition in 2017, her first year of senior international competition. She made her senior international debut at the Gym Festival Trnava where she finished seventh in the all-around and placed fifth in the balance beam final. She won the bronze medal in the all-around at the Czech National Championships. She also won silver medals on the uneven bars, the balance beam, and the floor exercise. She was then selected to compete at the World Championships where she placed fifty-first in the all-around during the qualification round.

=== 2018 ===
Holasová competed at her first FIG World Cup in 2018 in Doha, and she finished eighth on the balance beam. She won the all-around at the Czech National Championships. At the Gym Festival Trnava, she won silver medals on the vault and on the floor exercise and finished fourth in the all-around. Then at the Budapest Friendly, she won the bronze medal in the all-around behind Barbora Mokošová and Nóra Fehér, and she helped the Czech team win the silver medal behind Hungary. She then competed at the European Championships where the Czech team finished fifteenth. At the World Cup in Paris, she finished sixth on the vault and the balance beam, and she won the bronze medal on the floor exercise. She was then selected to the Czech team for the World Championships along with Eliska Firtova, Sabina Halova, Lucie Jirikova, and Dominika Ponizilova. The team finished twenty-fourth in the qualification round and earned the final spot to qualify as a team for the 2019 World Championships.

=== 2019 ===
Holasová began the 2019 season at the World Cup in Doha and finished fifth on the balance beam. She then competed at the European Championships, and she qualified for the all-around final where she finished twenty-second. She then won the all-around and every event at the Czech National Championships. She won the silver medal on floor at the European Games behind Anastasiia Bachynska. It was the first time in thirteen years that a Czech gymnast medaled at a continental championship. She then competed at the World Cup in Paris where she finished fourth on vault and won the bronze medal on the floor exercise. She was selected to compete at the World Championships along with Sandra Jessenova, Lucie Jirikova, Anna Maria Kanyai, and Dominika Ponizilova. The team finished twenty-third in the qualification round, and Holasová finished fifty-first in the all-around which earned her an individual spot at the 2020 Olympics.

=== 2020-2021 ===
Holasová competed at the 2020 World Cup in Szombathely and finished eighth on vault, and she won a bronze medal on the balance beam. She then competed at the 2020 European Championships along with Natalie Brabcova, Magdalena Coufalova, Sabina Halova, and Dominika Ponizilova. The team qualified to the team final and finished sixth.

At the 2021 European Championships, Holasová finished thirty-ninth in the all-around in the qualification round. In May 2021, she broke her leg and tore ligaments in her leg, which limited her training for the 2020 Olympics. However, she was still able to compete, and she finished seventy-third in the all-around during the qualification round.

== Competitive history ==
Competitive history of Aneta Holasová at the junior level
Year	Event	Team	AA	VT	UB	BB	FX
2013	Zelena Jama Open	3rd place, bronze medalist(s)	2nd place, silver medalist(s)				
2014	Gym Festival Trnava	2nd place, silver medalist(s)	2nd place, silver medalist(s)				
2014	Top Gym Tournament	5	9	8		12	8
2015	Gym Festival Trnava		2nd place, silver medalist(s)	2nd place, silver medalist(s)		1st place, gold medalist(s)	4
2015	European Youth Olympic Festival	12	19				
2015	Olympic Hopes Cup	3rd place, bronze medalist(s)	12				
2016	Czech Friendly	1st place, gold medalist(s)	1st place, gold medalist(s)				
2016	Polish Championships		1st place, gold medalist(s)				
2016	Gym Festival Trnava		1st place, gold medalist(s)	1st place, gold medalist(s)		2nd place, silver medalist(s)	1st place, gold medalist(s)
2016	Junior European Championships		WD				

Competitive history of Aneta Holasová at the senior level
Year	Event	Team	AA	VT	UB	BB	FX
2017	Gym Festival Trnava		7			5	
2017	Czech Championships		3rd place, bronze medalist(s)		2nd place, silver medalist(s)	2nd place, silver medalist(s)	2nd place, silver medalist(s)
2017	World Championships		51				
2018	Doha World Cup					8	
2018	Czech Championships		1st place, gold medalist(s)	3rd place, bronze medalist(s)	2nd place, silver medalist(s)		1st place, gold medalist(s)
2018	Gym Festival Trnava		4	2nd place, silver medalist(s)			2nd place, silver medalist(s)
2018	Budapest Friendly	2nd place, silver medalist(s)	3rd place, bronze medalist(s)				
2018	European Championships	15					
2018	Paris World Challenge Cup			6		6	3rd place, bronze medalist(s)
2018	World Championships	24					
2019	Doha World Cup					5	
2019	European Championships		22				
2019	Czech Championships		1st place, gold medalist(s)	1st place, gold medalist(s)	1st place, gold medalist(s)	1st place, gold medalist(s)	1st place, gold medalist(s)
2019	European Games		10				2nd place, silver medalist(s)
2019	Paris World Challenge Cup			4			3rd place, bronze medalist(s)
2019	World Championships	23	51				
2020	Szombathely World Challenge Cup			8		3rd place, bronze medalist(s)	
2020	European Championships	6					
2021
2021	European Championships		39				
2021	Olympic Games		71				
2022	Czech Championships		3rd place, bronze medalist(s)	1st place, gold medalist(s)	1st place, gold medalist(s)	6	6
2022	Osijek World Challenge Cup						5
2022	European Championships	14	31				
2022	Gym Festival Trnava		1st place, gold medalist(s)	1st place, gold medalist(s)	1st place, gold medalist(s)	2nd place, silver medalist(s)	1st place, gold medalist(s)
2022	Paris World Challenge Cup			7			
2022	Szombathely World Challenge Cup			7			8
2022	World Championships		45				
2024
2024	European Championships	11	33				
2025	Czech Championships		2nd place, silver medalist(s)	3rd place, bronze medalist(s)	6	6	
