= Tonya Paulsson =

Swedish artistic gymnast

- 陳瑞安
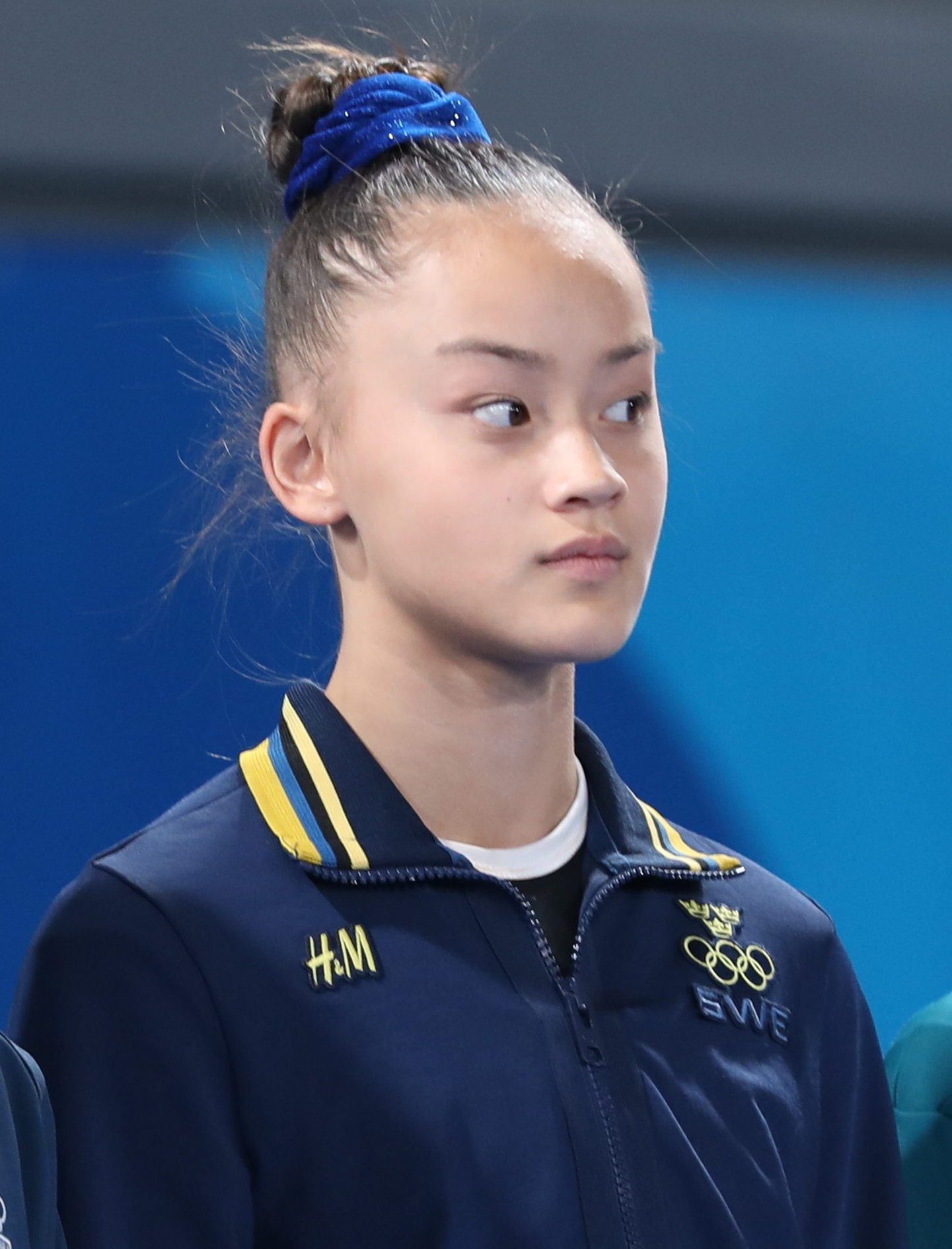
- Paulsson at the 2018 Youth Olympic Games

Personal information
- Full name: Tonya Helene Paulsson
- Alternative name: Chen Rui-an
- Born: 28 August 2003 (age 23) Malmö, Sweden

Gymnastics career
- Discipline: Women's artistic gymnastics
- Country represented: Chinese Taipei; (2025–present)
- Former countries represented: Sweden (2016–2024)
- College team: California Golden Bears
- Club: GK Motus-Salto
- Head coach: Janie Ahlstrom / Frederic Pierreville
Medal record
Women's artistic gymnastics
Representing Chinese Taipei
World University Games
Silver medal – second place	2025 Rhine-Ruhr	Balance beam
Bronze medal – third place	2025 Rhine-Ruhr	All-around
Representing Sweden
FIG World Cup
Event	1st	2nd	3rd
World Challenge Cup	2	1	0
Total	2	1	0
Representing (International Olympic Committee) Mixed-NOCs
Youth Olympic Games
Bronze medal – third place	2018 Buenos Aires	Mixed team

Tonya Helene Paulsson (Chinese: 陳瑞安; born 28 August 2003) is a Swedish and Taiwanese artistic gymnast. She currently represents Chinese Taipei in international competition and previously represented Sweden until 2024. She is the 2019 and 2020 Swedish national champion, and she represented Sweden at the 2018 Youth Olympics, where she was part of the Mixed NOC team who won bronze in the mixed multi-discipline team competition. Representing Chinese Taipei, she is the 2025 World University Games all-around bronze medalist and balance beam silver medalist. She is currently competing for the California Golden Bears in NCAA gymnastics.

== Early life ==
Paulsson was born in Malmö in 2003. Her mother is originally from Taiwan. Paulsson began gymnastics at the age of eight in 2010, after her gymnastics coach neighbor noticed her flexibility and agility on the local playground.

== Gymnastics career ==
=== 2016 ===
Paulsson competed at the Unni & Haralds Trophy in Oslo where she finished fourth in the all-around but won gold on uneven bars. The following month Paulsson competed at the Nordic Championships where she was limited to only competing on the uneven bars due to a knee injury. Despite the injury she helped Sweden finish first in the junior division. She next competed at the Swedish National Championships. She once again only competed on uneven bars but managed to finish first amongst the juniors.

=== 2017 ===
Paulsson competed at a team selection competition for the 2017 Junior Nordic Championships where she placed first in the all-around ahead of Jessica Castles and she also recorded the highest scores on vault and uneven bars. At the Junior Nordic Championships Paulsson helped Sweden finish in third place. Individually she finished sixteenth in the all-around but won gold on uneven bars. In June she competed at the Flanders International Team Challenge where she helped Sweden finish ninth.

In late June Paulsson competed at the Swedish National Championships where she won silver in the all-around behind Ida Staafgård, silver on vault behind Castles, gold on uneven bars, bronze on balance beam behind Staafgård and Castles, and fourth on floor exercise. In November Paulsson competed at the Swedish Cup where she finished first amongst the juniors. During event finals she finished second on vault, first on uneven bars, third on balance beam, and fifth on floor exercise. She ended the season competing at the Top Gym Tournament where she finished tenth in the team competition, seventeenth in the all-around, thirteenth on vault, sixth on uneven bars.

=== 2018 ===
Paulsson competed at the Youth Olympic Qualifier where she finished in twelfth place and qualified Sweden for a spot at the 2018 Summer Youth Olympics. She next competed at the Nordic Championships where she helped Sweden finish second behind Norway. Individually she won silver in the all-around behind Mari Kanter of Norway, gold on uneven bars, and bronze on floor exercise. She finished sixth on balance beam. She next competed at the Swedish National Championships where she placed first in the all-around, on uneven bars, on balance beam, and on floor exercise. Paulsson competed at the European Championships but failed to qualify for any event finals. Paulsson was selected to represent Sweden at the 2018 Youth Olympics held in Buenos Aires. While there she qualified for the all-around and uneven bars finals. During the all-around final she placed seventh. During the uneven bars final she once again placed seventh.

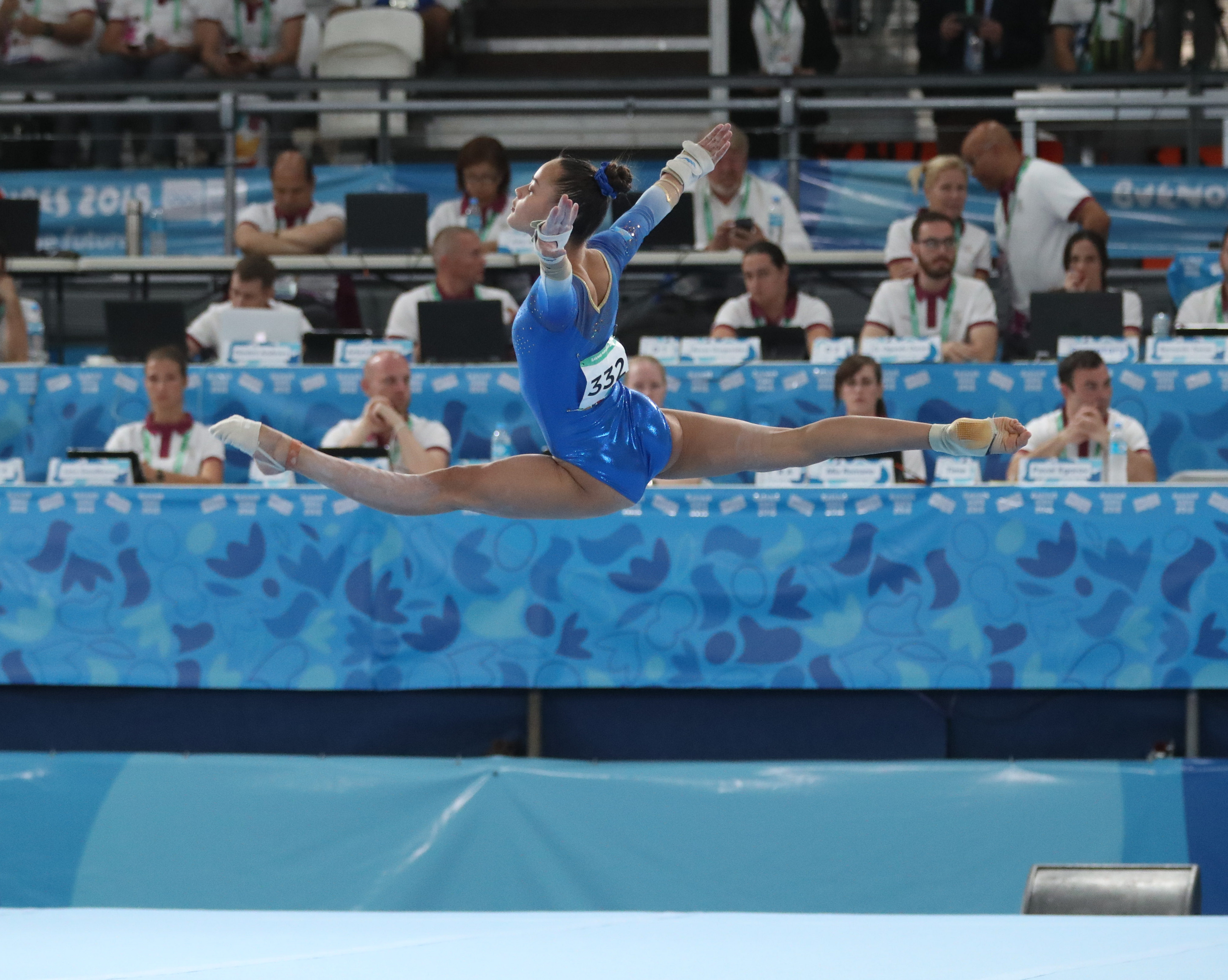
Floor Qualification

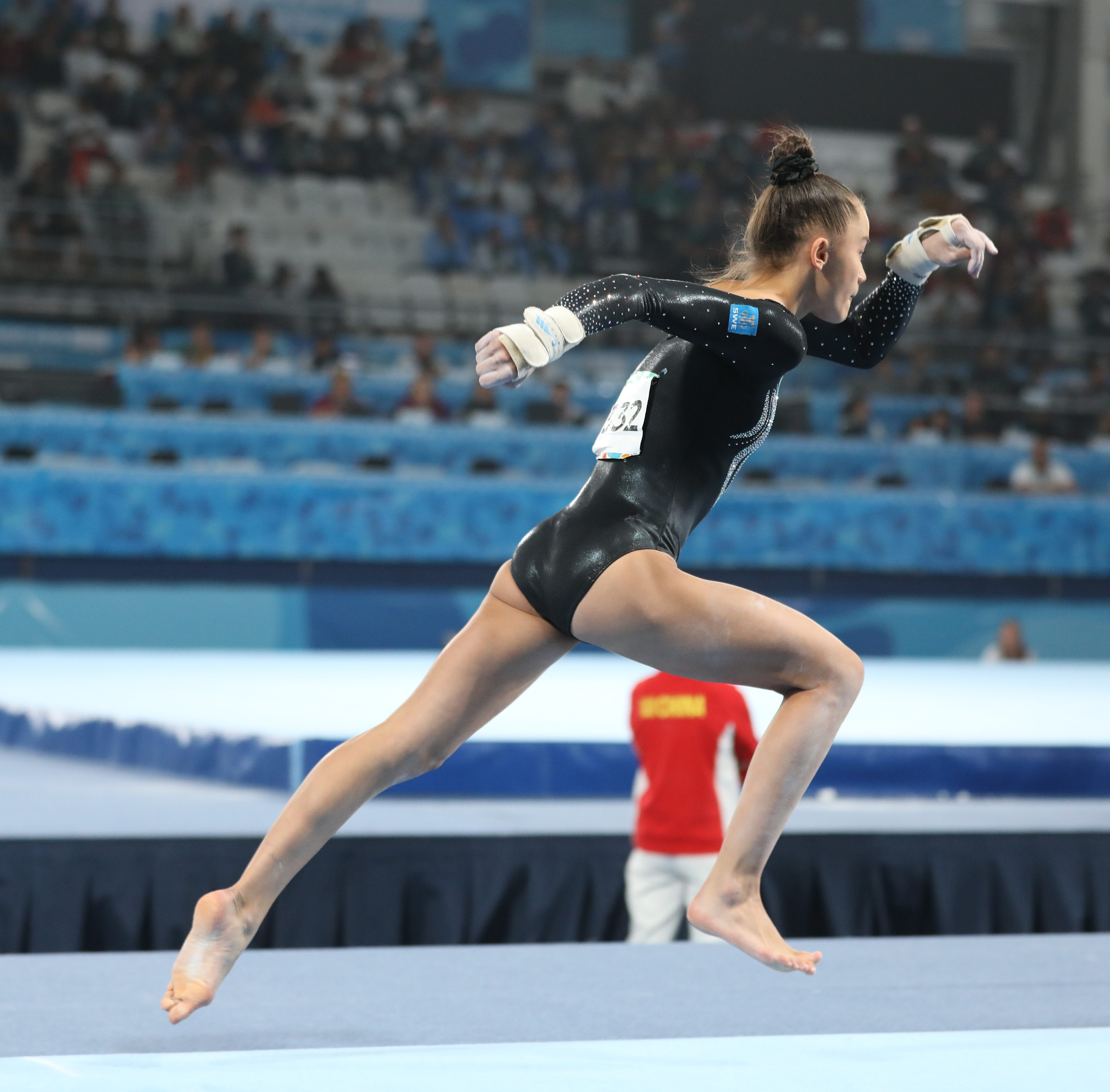
All-Around Final

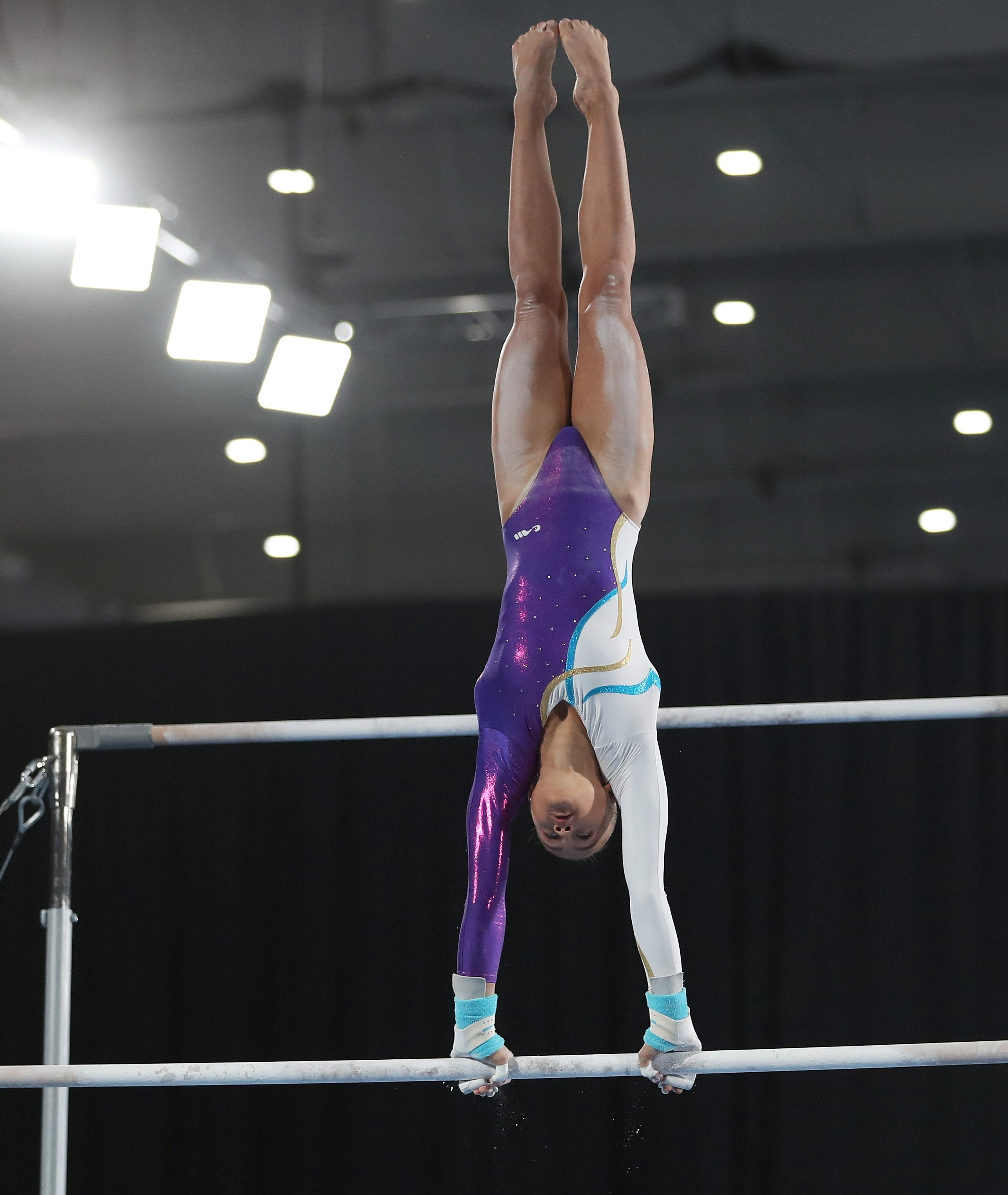
Uneven Bars Final

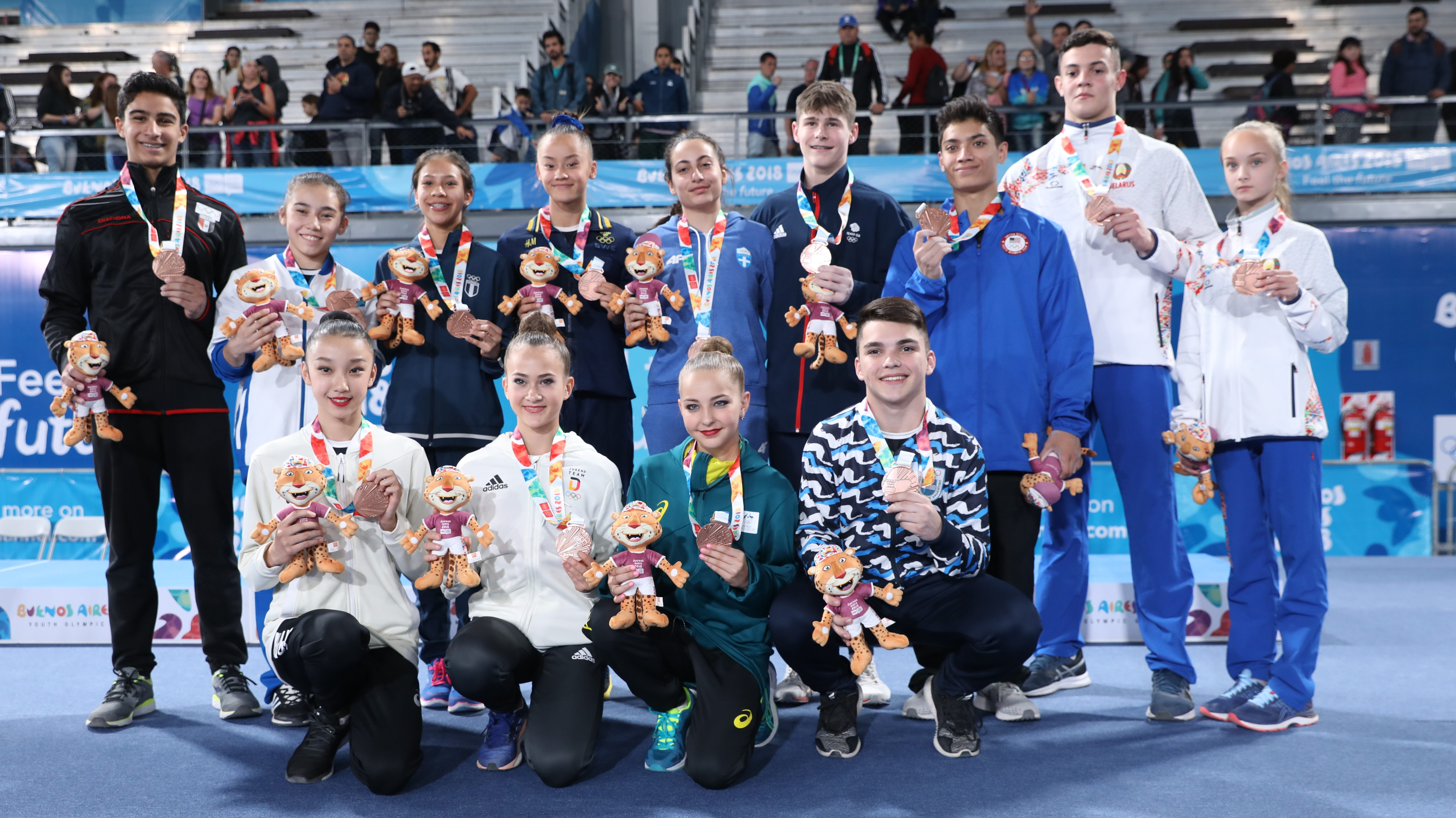
Mixed Multi-Discipline Team

Paulsson at the 2018 Youth Olympics

=== 2019 ===
Paulsson turned senior in 2019. She competed at the Swedish National Championships where she won gold in all-around and silver on uneven bars behind Jonna Adlerteg. She next competed at the Heerenveen Friendly where she finished seventeenth in the all-around. She ended the season competing at the Mälar Cup where she finished second behind Alva Eriksson in the all-around and on floor exercise. Additionally she tied for second with Eriksson on uneven bars behind Iida Haapala. She finished first on balance beam.

=== 2020 ===
In October Paulsson competed at the Swedish National Championships where she was able to retain her national title from the previous year. Additionally she won gold on balance beam and floor exercise and won silver on uneven bars behind Jonna Adlerteg.

=== 2021 ===
Paulsson competed at the European Championships where she qualified to the all-around final; she placed 14th. In September Paulsson was selected to compete at the World Championships alongside Nathalie Westlund and Jennifer Williams.

=== 2024 ===
Paulsson contemplated quitting at the beginning of the year, but she decided to continue competing and began to pursue a switch in country to represent Taiwan.

In May, Paulsson competed at the European Championships. Due to recovering from a knee injury, she only competed on the uneven bars.

Paulsson competed at the World Cup in Szombathely, Hungary in October. There she won silver on the uneven bars as well as gold on the balance beam and floor. She said that she was proud of her floor performance as that was her main focus for he competition. She also committed to attending the University of California, Berkeley as a collegiate gymnast beginning in the fall of 2025.

In November, Paulsson announced that she planned to switch her country representation from Sweden to Taiwan, her mother's home country. She said that she had lost trust in the leadership of Sweden's national team. A week later, she clarified that her training style did not work well with that expected at the national training center, which she visited periodically, and that she did not feel that she was treated properly there. She also said that she had received racist comments after announcing her country change, which the Swedish Gymnastics Federation denounced.

=== 2025 ===
In February 2025, Paulsson's nationality change was confirmed by the International Gymnastics Federation. Her performance in the National Intercollegiate Games from 27 April to 1 May 2025 qualified Paulsson for a position on Chinese Taipei's national gymnastics roster.

== Collegiate gymnastics career ==
=== 2025–2026 ===
In her first season of NCAA gymnastics, Paulsson was placed on the Women's Collegiate Gymnastics Association Regular Season All-America team, earning first-team honors on uneven bars and second-team honors in the all-around. She won the ACC Newcomer of the Year award. At the 2026 ACC Championships, Paulsson won the all-around title, becoming the first freshman to do so.

=== Regular season ranking ===
Season	All-around	Vault	Uneven bars	Balance beam	Floor exercise
2026	15th	153rd	5th	91st	35th

== Competitive history ==
=== Representing Sweden ===
Competitive history of Tonya Paulsson at the junior level
Year	Event	Team	AA	VT	UB	BB	FX
2016	Unni & Haralds Trophy		4		1st place, gold medalist(s)		
2016	Nordic Championships	1st place, gold medalist(s)					
2016	National Championships				1st place, gold medalist(s)		
2017	Nordic Team Selections		1st place, gold medalist(s)				
2017	Nordic Championships	3rd place, bronze medalist(s)	16		1st place, gold medalist(s)		
2017	FIT Team Challenge	9					
2017	Swedish Championships		2nd place, silver medalist(s)	2nd place, silver medalist(s)	1st place, gold medalist(s)	3rd place, bronze medalist(s)	4
2017	Swedish Cup		1st place, gold medalist(s)	2nd place, silver medalist(s)	1st place, gold medalist(s)	3rd place, bronze medalist(s)	5
2017	Top Gym Tournament	10	17	13	6		
2018	Youth Olympic Qualifier		12				
2018	Nordic Championships	2nd place, silver medalist(s)	2nd place, silver medalist(s)		1st place, gold medalist(s)	3rd place, bronze medalist(s)	6
2018	Swedish Championships		1st place, gold medalist(s)		1st place, gold medalist(s)	1st place, gold medalist(s)	1st place, gold medalist(s)
2018	Youth Olympic Games	(bronze) (Note: The teams were randomly assigned with gymnasts from different countries and disciplines)	7		7		

Competitive history of Tonya Paulsson at the senior level
Year	Event	Team	AA	VT	UB	BB	FX
2019	National Championships		1st place, gold medalist(s)		2nd place, silver medalist(s)		
2019	Heerenveen Friendly		17				
2019	Mälar Cup		2nd place, silver medalist(s)		2nd place, silver medalist(s)	1st place, gold medalist(s)	2nd place, silver medalist(s)
2020	National Championships		1st place, gold medalist(s)		2nd place, silver medalist(s)	1st place, gold medalist(s)	1st place, gold medalist(s)
2021
2021	European Championships		14				
2021	Osijek Challenge Cup			7	5		
2021	FIT Challenge	7	31				
2021	World Championships		35				
2022
2022	European Championships		26				
2022	World Championships	18					
2023
2023	European Championships	10	14				
2024
2024	European Championships	8					
2024	Szombathely Challenge Cup				2nd place, silver medalist(s)	1st place, gold medalist(s)	1st place, gold medalist(s)

=== Representing Chinese Taipei ===
Competitive history of Tonya Paulsson at the senior level
Year	Event	Team	AA	VT	UB	BB	FX
2025
2025	Asian Championships	4	4		5	8	6
2025	World University Games	6	3rd place, bronze medalist(s)			2nd place, silver medalist(s)	4

== See also ==
- Nationality changes in gymnastics
