= Nordic Artistic Gymnastics Championships =

The Nordic Artistic Gymnastics Championships is an artistic gymnastics competition for both male and female gymnasts from countries and dependencies from the Nordics.

== Participating nations ==
- Denmark
- Faroe Islands
- Finland
- Iceland
- Norway
- Sweden

== Editions ==
Year	Host city	Country	Ref
2012	Greve	Denmark	
2013	Elverum	Norway	
2014	Halmstad	Sweden	
2015		Finland	
2016	Reykjavík	Iceland	
2017	Oslo	Norway	
2018	Farum	Denmark	
2019	Halmstad (MAG); Västerås (WAG)	Sweden	
2020	Finland	Cancelled due to the COVID-19 pandemic	
2021	Virtual	Virtual	
2022	Kópavogur	Iceland	
2023	Helsinki	Finland	
2024	Oslo	Norway	
2025	Aalborg	Denmark	
2026	Åland	Finland	
