= Hanna Szujó =

Hungarian artistic gymnast

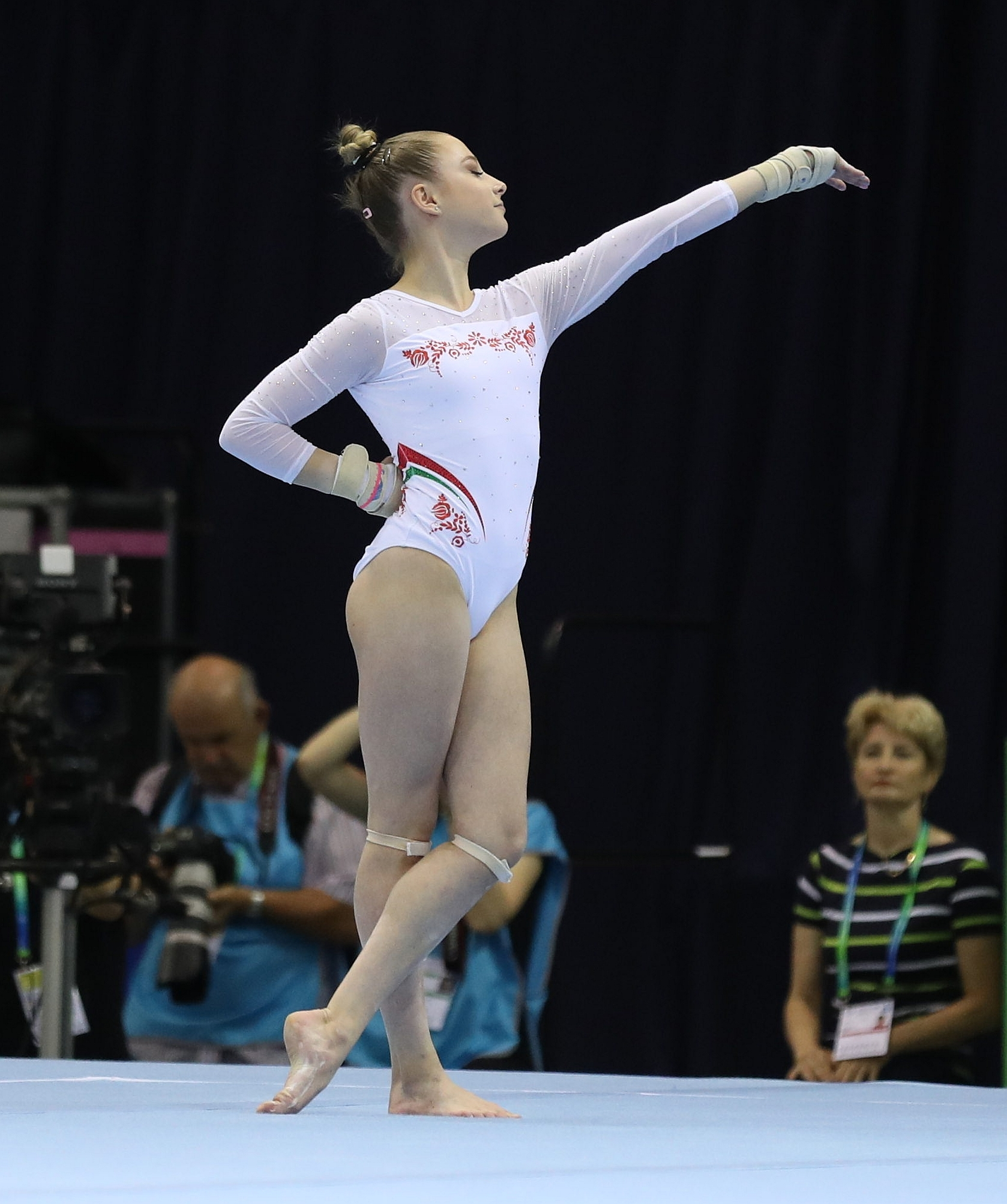
- Szujó at the 2019 Junior World Championships

Personal information
- Full name: Hanna Szujó
- Born: 15 February 2004 (age 22) Békéscsaba, Hungary

Gymnastics career
- Discipline: Women's artistic gymnastics
- Country represented: Hungary (2016–present)
- Club: Torna Club Békéscsaba
- Head coaches: Tunde Zsilinszki (club); Imre Draskoczy (national team)
- Assistant coach: Pal Petrovszki
Medal record
Artistic gymnastics
Representing Hungary
FIG World Cup
Event	1st	2nd	3rd
World Challenge Cup	1	0	0
Total	1	0	0

Hanna Szujó (born 15 February 2004) is a Hungarian artistic gymnast who represented Hungary at the inaugural Junior World Championships.

== Early life ==
Hanna Szujó was born in Békéscsaba, Hungary on 15 February 2004. Her older sister Dorka is also a gymnast.

== Junior gymnastics career ==
=== 2016 ===
Szujó competed at the Eva Kanyo Cup in the espoir division. She won the all-around and also placed first on vault and balance beam, second on floor exercise, and third on uneven bars. She next competed at the Győr Trophy where she placed twelfth in the all-around, fifth on vault, and fourth on floor exercise.

=== 2017 ===
In April 2017 Szujó competed at the Elek Matolay Memorial where she placed sixth in the all-around and on vault, fifth on floor exercise, and second on balance beam. She next competed at the Hungarian Master Championships where she placed eighth in the all-around and fifth on uneven bars.

=== 2018 ===
In May Szujó competed at the Elek Matolay Memorial where she placed first in the junior all-around and on floor exercise. Additionally she placed second on uneven bars behind Zója Székely and fifth on balance beam. In June she competed at Gym Festival Trnava where she placed fifth in the all-around and third on balance beam behind Anastasia Bachynska and Ioana Stănciulescu. She next competed in a friendly competition where she helped the Hungarian junior team win gold and individually she placed third in the all-around.

In August Szujó represented Hungary at the 2018 European Championships alongside Csenge Bácskay, Regina Medved, Bianka Schermann, and Székely; they placed ninth. At the Hungarian Championships Szujó only competed on uneven bars where she finished third. In October she competed at the Salamunov Memorial competition where she placed first in the all-around and on all four apparatuses. She ended the season competing at the Olympic Hopes Cup where she placed first in the all-around, second on floor exercise, third on balance beam, and fourth on vault.

=== 2019 ===
Szujó began the year competing at the Elek Matolay Memorial, International GymSport, and Gym Festival Trnava. She was selected to represent Hungary at the inaugural Junior World Championships alongside Mirtill Makovits and Nikolett Szilágyi; they finished sixteenth as a team and individually Szujó placed 42nd in the all-around. Szujó next competed at the European Youth Olympic Festival alongside Makovits. They finished seventh as a team and Szujó finished 16th in the all-around. Szujó ended the year competing at the Olympic Hopes Cup where she helped Hungary finish third. Individually she finished twelfth in the all-around and seventh on vault and floor exercise.

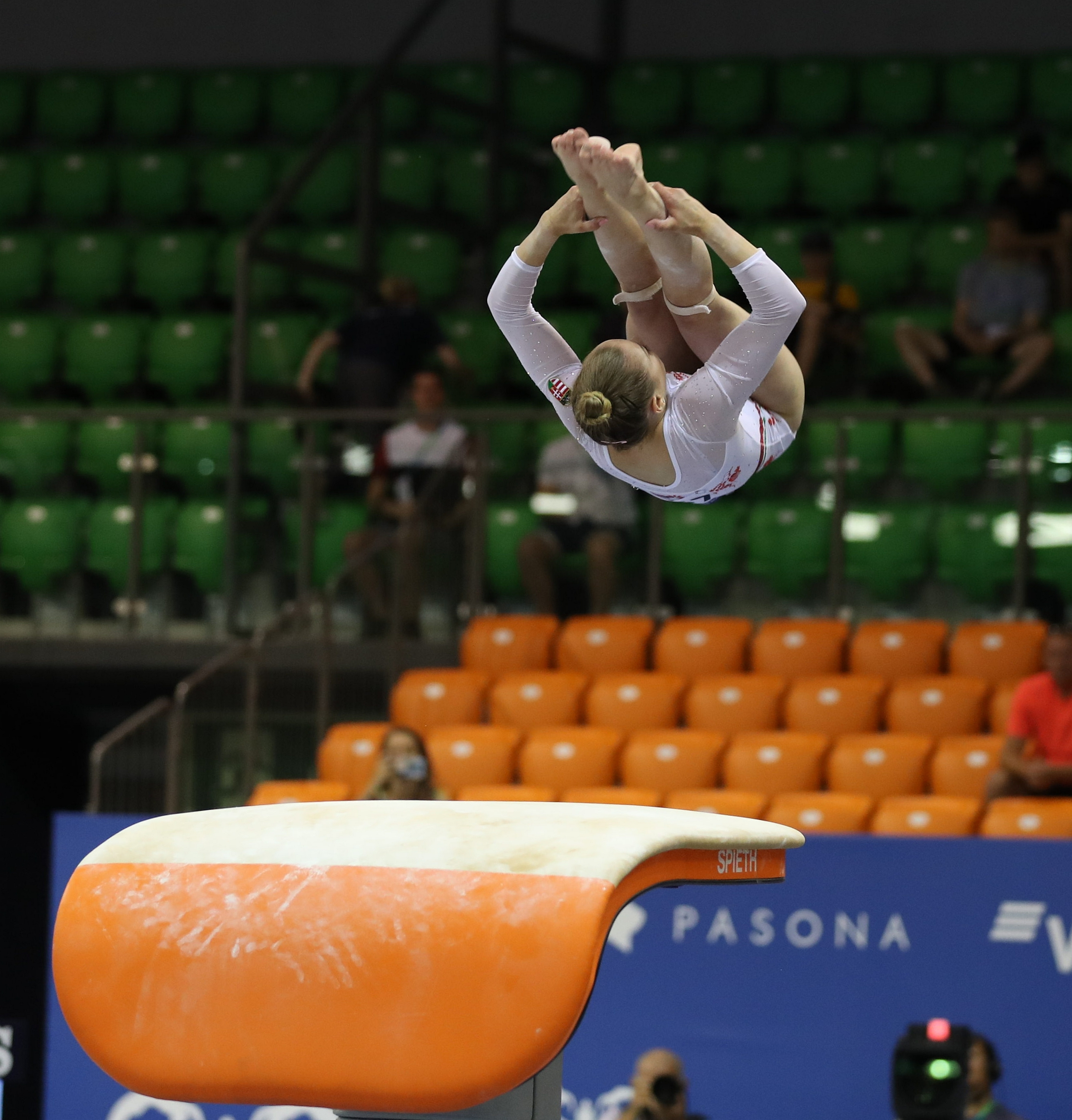
Vault

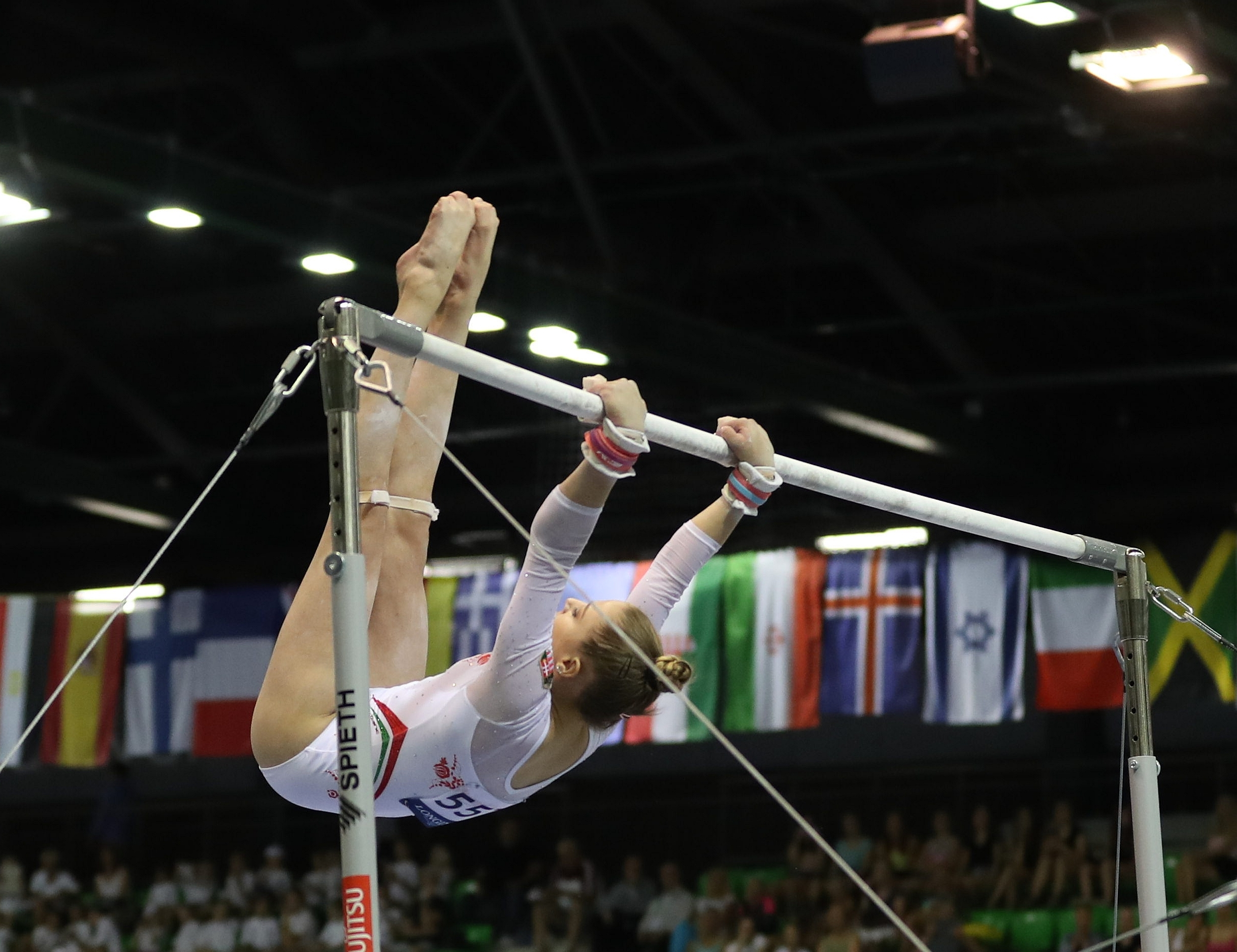
Uneven Bars

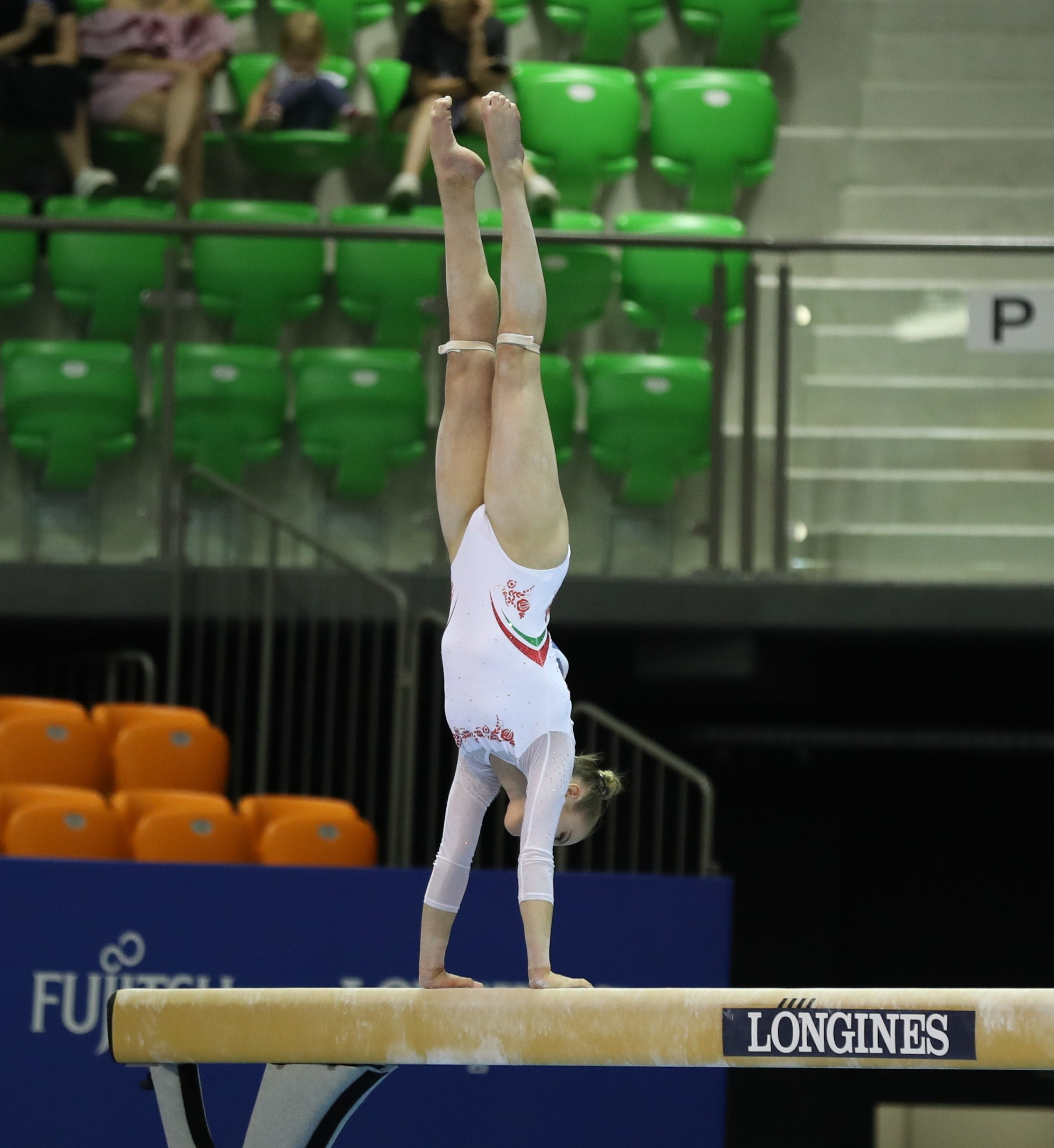
Balance Beam

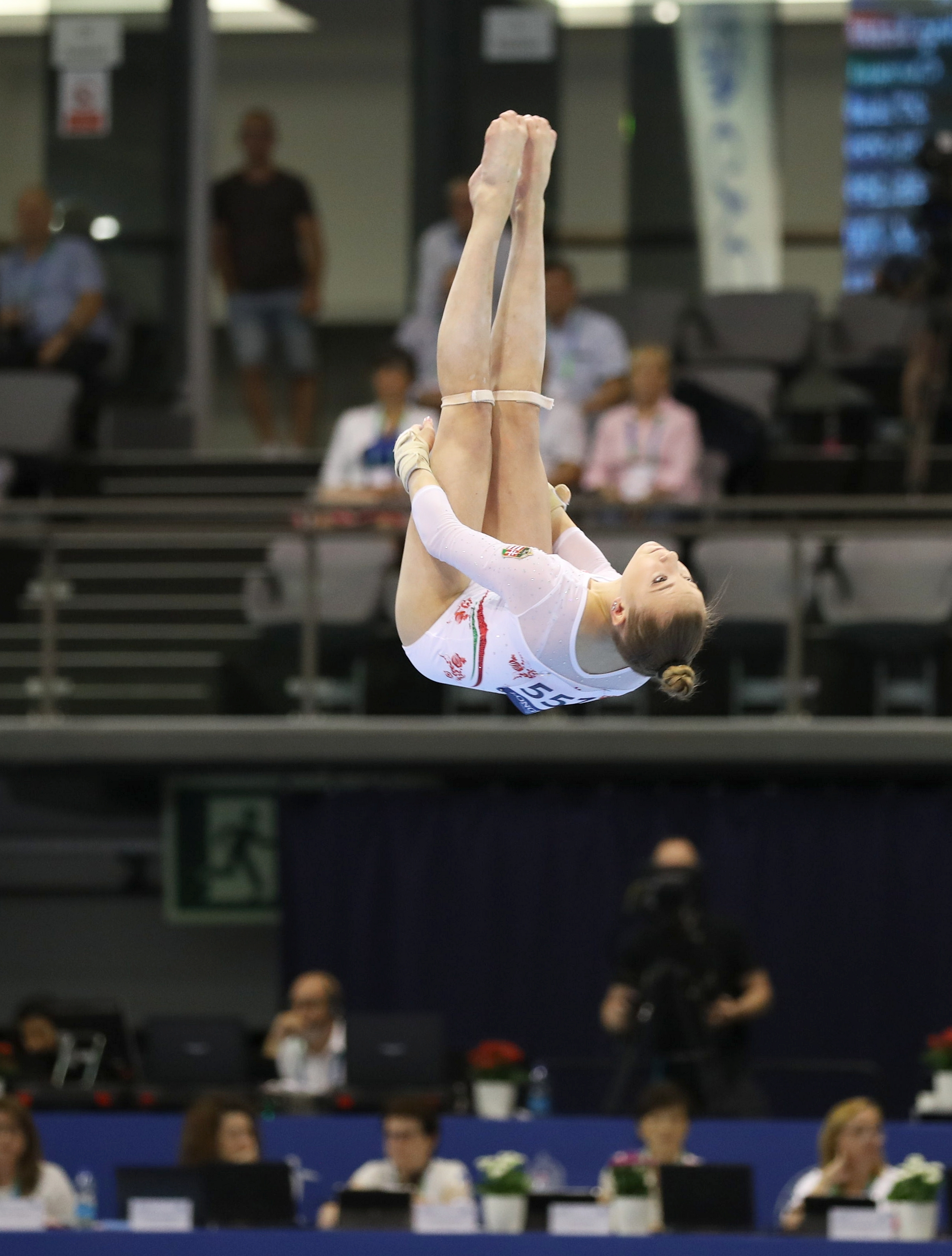
Floor Exercise

Szujó at the 2019 Junior World Championships

== Senior gymnastics career ==
=== 2020–21 ===
Szujó turned senior in 2020. Most competitions were canceled or postponed due to the global COVID-19 pandemic. In October Szujó competed at the Hungarian Championships where she placed third in the all-around, fifth on vault, second on balance beam, and third on floor exercise.

In 2021 Szujó returned to international competition at the Varna Challenge Cup where she won gold on floor exercise, tied with Dildora Aripova. Additionally she competed at the Osijek and Koper Challenge Cups; however she did not win any medals. She competed at the Flanders International Team Challenge where she helped Hungary place ninth as a team. Individually she won silver on vault behind compatriot Csenge Bácskay.

== Competitive history ==
Competitive history of Hanna Szujó at the junior level
Year	Event	Team	AA	VT	UB	BB	FX
2016	Eva Kanyo Cup		1st place, gold medalist(s)	1st place, gold medalist(s)	3rd place, bronze medalist(s)	1st place, gold medalist(s)	2nd place, silver medalist(s)
2016	Győr Trophy		12	5			4
2017	Elek Matolay Memorial		6	6		2nd place, silver medalist(s)	5
2017	Hungarian Master Championships		8		5		
2018	Elek Matolay Memorial		1st place, gold medalist(s)		2nd place, silver medalist(s)	5	1st place, gold medalist(s)
2018	Gym Festival Trnava		5			3rd place, bronze medalist(s)	
2018	Budapest Friendly	1st place, gold medalist(s)	3rd place, bronze medalist(s)				
2018	Hungarian Event Championships			4	4	1st place, gold medalist(s)	2nd place, silver medalist(s)
2018	European Championships	9					
2018	Hungarian Championships				3rd place, bronze medalist(s)		
2018	Salamunov Memorial		1st place, gold medalist(s)	1st place, gold medalist(s)	1st place, gold medalist(s)	1st place, gold medalist(s)	1st place, gold medalist(s)
2018	Hungarian Masters Championships		7	5			4
2018	Olympic Hopes Cup		1st place, gold medalist(s)	4		3rd place, bronze medalist(s)	2nd place, silver medalist(s)
2019	Elek Matolay Memorial		4	1st place, gold medalist(s)	4		
2019	International GymSport		4		3rd place, bronze medalist(s)		
2019	Gym Festival Trnava		3rd place, bronze medalist(s)	2nd place, silver medalist(s)	5	1st place, gold medalist(s)	4
2019	Junior World Championships	16	42				
2019	Euro Youth Olympic Festival	7	16				
2019	Hungarian Master Championships		6	3rd place, bronze medalist(s)			4
2019	Olympic Hopes Cup	3rd place, bronze medalist(s)	12	7			7

Competitive history of Hanna Szujó at the senior level
Year	Event	Team	AA	VT	UB	BB	FX
2020	Hungarian Championships		3rd place, bronze medalist(s)	5		2nd place, silver medalist(s)	2nd place, silver medalist(s)
2021	Super Team Championships	6	4				
2021	Varna Challenge Cup						1st place, gold medalist(s)
2021	Osijek Challenge Cup			6		8	7
2021	Flanders Team Challenge	9		2nd place, silver medalist(s)			
2021	Koper Challenge Cup					R2	
