= Artistic gymnastics at the 2019 European Youth Summer Olympic Festival =

- Venue: National Gymnastics Arena
- Location: Baku, Azerbaijan
- Dates: 23–27 July

Artistic gymnastics at the 2019 European Youth Summer Olympic Festival are held at the National Gymnastics Arena in Baku, Azerbaijan, from 23 to 27 July 2019.

== Medals summary ==
=== Medalists ===
Event	Gold	Silver	Bronze
Men
Team	Ukraine; Nazar Chepurnyi; Volodymyr Kostiuk; Illia Kovtun	Russia; Kirill Gashkov; Mukhammadzhon Iakubov; Ivan Kuliak	Italy; Lorenzo Bonicelli; Ivan Brunello; Lorenzo Minh Casali
All-around	(Ukraine) Illia Kovtun	(Russia) Ivan Kuliak	(Russia) Mukhammadzhon Iakubov
Floor exercise	(Ukraine) Nazar Chepurnyi	(Ukraine) Illia Kovtun	(Russia) Ivan Kuliak
Pommel horse	(Ukraine) Nazar Chepurnyi	(Azerbaijan) Samad Mammadli	(Ukraine) Volodymyr Kostiuk
Rings	(Russia) Mukhammadzhon Iakubov	(Ukraine) Nazar Chepurnyi	(Russia) Ivan Kuliak
Vault	(United Kingdom) Raekwon Baptiste	(Romania) Robert Burtănete	(Romania) Gabriel Burtănete
Parallel bars	(Ukraine) Illia Kovtun	(Ukraine) Volodymyr Kostiuk	(Hungary) Krisztián Balázs
Horizontal bar	(Ukraine) Illia Kovtun	(France) Lucas Desanges	(Italy) Ivan Brunello
Women
Team	Russia; Irina Komnova; Viktoria Listunova; Yana Vorona	Romania; Antonia Duță; Silviana Sfiringu; Ioana Stănciulescu	Great Britain; Ondine Achampong; Halle Hilton; Annie Young
All-around	(Russia) Viktoria Listunova	(United Kingdom) Ondine Achampong	(Russia) Yana Vorona
Vault	(Russia) Viktoria Listunova	(Ukraine) Anastasiia Motak	(Romania) Silviana Sfiringu
Uneven bars	(Russia) Viktoria Listunova	(Russia) Irina Komnova	(Romania) Ioana Stănciulescu
Balance beam	(United Kingdom) Ondine Achampong	(Romania) Silviana Sfiringu	(France) Clarisse Passeron
Floor exercise	(Russia) Viktoria Listunova	(Romania) Ioana Stănciulescu	(Romania) Silviana Sfiringu

=== Medal standings ===
==== Overall ====
* Host nation (Azerbaijan)

Rank	Nation	Gold	Silver	Bronze	Total
1	Ukraine (UKR)	6	4	1	11
2	Russia (RUS)	6	3	4	13
3	Great Britain (GBR)	2	1	1	4
4	Romania (ROU)	0	4	4	8
5	France (FRA)	0	1	1	2
6	Azerbaijan (AZE)*	0	1	0	1
7	Italy (ITA)	0	0	2	2
8	Hungary (HUN)	0	0	1	1
Totals (8 entries)		14	14	14	42

==== Men ====
* Host nation (Azerbaijan)

Rank	Nation	Gold	Silver	Bronze	Total
1	Ukraine (UKR)	6	3	1	10
2	Russia (RUS)	1	2	3	6
3	Great Britain (GBR)	1	0	0	1
4	Romania (ROU)	0	1	1	2
5	Azerbaijan (AZE)*	0	1	0	1
5	France (FRA)	0	1	0	1
7	Italy (ITA)	0	0	2	2
8	Hungary (HUN)	0	0	1	1
Totals (8 entries)		8	8	8	24

==== Women ====
Rank	Nation	Gold	Silver	Bronze	Total
1	Russia (RUS)	5	1	1	7
2	Great Britain (GBR)	1	1	1	3
3	Romania (ROU)	0	3	3	6
4	Ukraine (UKR)	0	1	0	1
5	France (FRA)	0	0	1	1
Totals (5 entries)		6	6	6	18

== Men's results ==
=== Team ===
Rank	Team	Floor (gymnastics)	Pommel horse	Rings (gymnastics)	Vault (gymnastics)	Parallel bars	Horizontal bar	Total
1st place, gold medalist(s)	Ukraine	28.100	26.500	26.650	28.250	28.600	25.850	163.950
1st place, gold medalist(s)	Nazar Chepurnyi	14.050	13.250	13.400	14.250	14.000	10.900	163.950
1st place, gold medalist(s)	Volodymyr Kostiuk	13.650	13.250	13.000	13.650	13.850	12.500	163.950
1st place, gold medalist(s)	Illia Kovtun	14.050	12.100	13.250	14.000	14.600	13.350	163.950
2nd place, silver medalist(s)	Russia	27.400	26.450	27.150	28.400	27.750	25.950	163.100
2nd place, silver medalist(s)	Kirill Gashkov	12.200	12.800	13.250	14.200	13.150	11.900	163.100
2nd place, silver medalist(s)	Mukhammadzhon Iakubov	13.450	13.250	13.450	14.100	13.700	13.050	163.100
2nd place, silver medalist(s)	Ivan Kuliak	13.950	13.200	13.700	14.200	14.050	12.900	163.100
3rd place, bronze medalist(s)	Italy	26.800	26.400	26.550	27.800	25.383	26.250	159.183
3rd place, bronze medalist(s)	Lorenzo Bonicelli	13.250	13.050	11.350	13.800	12.833	12.950	159.183
3rd place, bronze medalist(s)	Ivan Brunello	13.350	13.050	13.150	14.000	12.550	13.300	159.183
3rd place, bronze medalist(s)	Lorenzo Minh Casali	13.050	13.350	13.400	12.800	12.550	11.100	159.183
4	Great Britain	27.200	25.450	26.200	28.350	25.850	25.200	158.250
4	Raekwon Baptiste	12.300	13.000	13.250	14.450	12.800	12.500	158.250
4	Sam Mostowfi	13.700	12.450	12.950	13.900	12.650	12.700	158.250
4	Luke Whitehouse	13.500	11.500	12.350	13.800	13.050	12.300	158.250
5	France	26.800	26.200	24.950	27.450	26.250	25.700	157.350
5	Arthur Ballon	12.700	10.800	12.750	13.950	13.000	12.250	157.350
5	Lucas Desanges	13.100	12.900	10.800	13.500	13.250	13.350	157.350
5	Leo Saladino	13.700	13.300	12.200	12.950	11.900	12.350	157.350
6	Romania	25.650	25.400	26.250	28.300	26.450	24.750	156.800
6	Gabriel Burtănete	12.150	12.600	13.100	14.600	13.050	12.750	156.800
6	Robert Burtănete	13.500	12.800	13.150	13.700	13.400	12.000	156.800
6	Raul-Gabriel Soica	11.550	12.450	12.350	13.100	11.900	11.650	156.800
7	Switzerland	26.150	24.400	26.950	27.900	25.800	25.050	156.250
7	Luca Bottarelli	12.850	12.300	13.500	13.300	13.100	12.500	156.250
7	Florian Langenegger	13.050	11.350	13.400	14.100	12.200	12.550	156.250
7	Mattia Piffaretti	13.100	12.100	13.450	13.800	12.700	12.350	156.250
8	Germany	25.850	25.000	25.550	26.850	26.150	24.500	153.900
8	Thore Caio Beissel	12.950	11.800	12.300	13.800	12.400	10.050	153.900
8	Willi Leonhard Binder	12.900	13.000	12.750	13.050	12.750	12.450	153.900
8	Pascal Brendel	12.600	12.000	12.800	13.000	13.400	12.050	153.900

=== Individual all-around ===
Rank	Gymnast	Floor (gymnastics)	Pommel horse	Rings (gymnastics)	Vault (gymnastics)	Parallel bars	Horizontal bar	Total
1st place, gold medalist(s)	Illia Kovtun (UKR)	13.900	13.550	12.750	14.200	14.050	13.550	82.000
2nd place, silver medalist(s)	Ivan Kuliak (RUS)	13.850	12.550	13.450	14.200	14.100	12.950	81.100
3rd place, bronze medalist(s)	Mukhammadzhon Iakubov (RUS)	13.100	13.000	13.300	14.150	13.800	13.200	80.550
4	Ivan Brunello (ITA)	13.100	12.950	12.950	14.250	13.500	13.500	80.250
5	Gabriel Burtănete (ROU)	13.150	12.500	13.350	14.350	13.150	12.800	79.300
6	Nazar Chepurnyi (UKR)	14.250	12.650	13.150	14.600	13.450	10.850	78.950
7	Leo Saladino (FRA)	13.200	12.850	13.300	14.300	13.550	11.550	78.750
8	Mattia Piffaretti (SUI)	13.300	12.550	13.200	13.850	12.700	12.150	77.750
9	Bora Tarhan (TUR)	13.600	11.900	12.750	14.150	13.050	11.850	77.300
10	Nicola Cuyle (BEL)	13.150	12.550	12.550	13.600	13.250	12.200	77.300
11	Robert Burtănete (ROU)	13.250	12.100	12.600	13.350	13.800	12.100	77.200
12	Victor Martinez Marechal (BEL)	12.500	12.100	12.350	13.950	13.300	12.500	76.700
13	Krisztián Balázs (HUN)	13.250	11.450	13.050	13.300	13.200	12.350	76.600
14	Pascal Brendel (GER)	12.950	13.000	12.350	13.000	13.200	12.050	76.550
15	Luca Bottarelli (SUI)	13.350	12.250	13.150	13.350	11.900	12.350	76.350
16	Arthur Ballon (FRA)	13.200	11.750	11.950	13.900	13.000	12.050	75.850
17	Lorenzo Bonicelli (ITA)	13.400	11.900	12.450	13.750	12.450	11.850	75.800
18	Emre Dodanli (TUR)	13.650	11.300	11.950	13.950	12.550	12.150	75.550
19	Samad Mammadli (AZE)	13.800	12.000	11.500	12.700	12.950	12.550	75.500
20	Raekwon Baptiste (GBR)	11.900	13.000	13.050	14.200	12.600	10.700	75.450
21	Marcus Stenberg (SWE)	13.050	11.650	12.650	12.850	12.750	12.400	75.350
22	Sam Mostowfi (GBR)	13.550	10.900	12.550	14.000	11.350	12.750	75.100
23	Kacper Garnczarek (POL)	12.750	12.500	12.250	12.850	11.800	12.700	74.850
24	Willi Leonhard Binder (GER)	11.850	12.100	11.350	12.950	12.600	11.750	72.600

=== Floor ===
Rank	Gymnast	D Score	E Score	Pen.	Total
1st place, gold medalist(s)	Nazar Chepurnyi (UKR)	5.2	9.100		14.300
2nd place, silver medalist(s)	Illia Kovtun (UKR)	5.1	8.900		14.000
3rd place, bronze medalist(s)	Ivan Kuliak (RUS)	4.9	9.066		13.966
4	Emre Dodlani (TUR)	4.9	8.866		13.766
5	Sam Mostowfi (GBR)	5.0	8.766		13.766
6	Samad Mammadli (AZE)	4.7	9.033		13.733
7	Krisztián Balázs (HUN)	4.3	8.600	-0.1	12.800
8	Leo Saladino (FRA)	4.8	7.733		12.533

=== Pommel horse ===
Rank	Gymnast	D Score	E Score	Pen.	Total
1st place, gold medalist(s)	Nazar Chepurnyi (UKR)	5.5	8.400		13.900
2nd place, silver medalist(s)	Samad Mammadli (AZE)	4.9	8.700		13.600
3rd place, bronze medalist(s)	Volodymyr Kostiuk (UKR)	5.1	8.433		13.533
4	Mukhammadzhon Iakubov (RUS)	4.5	9.000		13.500
5	Ivan Kuliak (RUS)	4.4	8.833		13.233
6	Lorenzo Minh Casali (ITA)	4.3	8.800		13.100
7	Lorenzo Bonicelli (ITA)	4.5	8.600		13.100
8	Leo Saladino (FRA)	4.3	7.233		11.533

=== Rings ===
Rank	Gymnast	D Score	E Score	Pen.	Total
1st place, gold medalist(s)	Mukhammadzhon Iakubov (RUS)	4.3	9.200		13.500
2nd place, silver medalist(s)	Nazar Chepurnyi (UKR)	4.5	8.966		13.466
3rd place, bronze medalist(s)	Ivan Kuliak (RUS)	4.5	8.833		13.333
4	Luca Bottarelli (SUI)	4.2	9.100		13.300
5	Krisztián Balázs (HUN)	4.3	8.966		13.266
6	Lorenzo Minh Casali (ITA)	4.3	8.933		13.233
7	Mattia Piffaretti (SUI)	4.2	9.000		13.200
8	Jorge Campana (ESP)	4.2	8.766		12.966

=== Vault ===
Position	Gymnast	Vault 1				Vault 2				Total
Position	Gymnast	D Score	E Score	Pen.	Score 1	D Score	E Score	Pen.	Score 2	Total
1st place, gold medalist(s)	(United Kingdom) Raekwon Baptiste	5.2	8.900		14.100	4.8	9.066		13.866	13.983
2nd place, silver medalist(s)	(Romania) Robert Burtănete	5.2	8.900	-0.1	14.000	4.8	9.066		13.866	13.933
3rd place, bronze medalist(s)	(Romania) Gabriel Burtanete	5.2	9.133		14.333	5.2	8.133		13.333	13.833
4	(Ukraine) Nazar Chepurnyi	5.2	9.166		14.366	5.2	7.866		13.066	13.716
5	(United Kingdom) Sam Mostowfi	4.8	8.766		13.566	4.0	9.300		13.300	13.433
6	(Spain) Jorge Campana	5.2	7.833		13.033	4.0	9.033		13.033	13.033
7	(Russia) Ivan Kuliak	4.8	9.033		13.833	4.0	7.966	-0.1	11.866	12.849
8	(Belgium) Victor Martinez Marechal	5.2	7.966		13.166	4.8	7.900	-0.3	12.400	12.783

=== Parallel bars ===
Rank	Gymnast	D Score	E Score	Pen.	Total
1st place, gold medalist(s)	Illia Kovtun (UKR)	5.7	8.900		14.600
2nd place, silver medalist(s)	Volodymyr Kostiuk (UKR)	5.4	8.900		14.300
3rd place, bronze medalist(s)	Krisztián Balázs (HUN)	5.0	8.566		13.566
4	Robert Burtănete (ROU)	4.6	8.933		13.533
5	Pascal Brendel (GER)	4.6	8.666		13.266
6	Lucas Desanges (FRA)	4.5	8.533		13.033
7	Ivan Kuliak (RUS)	5.0	7.233		12.233
8	Mukhammadzhon Iakubov (RUS)	4.7	6.766		11.466

=== Horizontal bar ===
Rank	Gymnast	D Score	E Score	Pen.	Total
1st place, gold medalist(s)	Illia Kovtun (UKR)	5.0	8.366		13.366
2nd place, silver medalist(s)	Lucas Desanges (FRA)	4.9	8.333		13.233
3rd place, bronze medalist(s)	Ivan Brunello (ITA)	4.5	8.700		13.200
4	Mukhammadzhon Iakubov (RUS)	4.4	8.766		13.166
5	Ivan Kuliak (RUS)	4.5	8.400		12.900
6	Lorenzo Bonicelli (ITA)	4.0	8.800		12.800
7	Krisztián Balázs (HUN)	4.4	7.333		11.733
8	Kacper Garnczarek (POL)	3.9	7.433		11.333

== Women's results ==
=== Team ===
Rank	Team	Vault (gymnastics)	Uneven bars	Balance beam	Floor (gymnastics)	Total
1st place, gold medalist(s)	Russia	28.350	27.250	25.150	27.300	108.050
1st place, gold medalist(s)	Irina Komnova	13.500	13.100	11.550	13.000	108.050
1st place, gold medalist(s)	Viktoria Listunova	14.250	14.150	12.950	14.200	108.050
1st place, gold medalist(s)	Yana Vorona	14.100	12.600	12.200	13.100	108.050
2nd place, silver medalist(s)	Romania	28.850	25.600	25.950	26.400	106.800
2nd place, silver medalist(s)	Antonia Duță	12.750	12.450	12.350	12.950	106.800
2nd place, silver medalist(s)	Silviana Sfiringu	14.450	11.350	13.150	13.050	106.800
2nd place, silver medalist(s)	Ioana Stanciulescu	14.400	13.150	12.800	13.350	106.800
3rd place, bronze medalist(s)	Great Britain	26.900	24.900	26.800	25.250	103.850
3rd place, bronze medalist(s)	Ondine Achampong	13.500	12.500	13.450	12.700	103.850
3rd place, bronze medalist(s)	Halle Hilton	13.400	12.200	13.350	12.250	103.850
3rd place, bronze medalist(s)	Annie Young	13.300	12.400	12.750	12.550	103.850
4	Italy	26.900	24.350	25.900	25.700	102.850
4	Veronica Mandriota	13.600	11.950	12.900	12.850	102.850
4	Micol Minotti	13.300	11.550	13.000	12.850	102.850
4	Chiara Vincenzi	13.150	12.400	11.800	12.750	102.850
5	France	26.550	24.000	26.500	25.400	102.450
5	Alizée Letrange-Mouakit	11.750	12.400	13.200	12.850	102.450
5	Clarisse Passeron	12.900	8.850	13.300	12.550	102.450
5	Mathilde Wahl	13.650	11.600	12.250	12.100	102.450
6	Belgium	25.600	25.600	23.950	23.850	99.000
6	Charlotte Beydts	13.200	10.500	11.750	11.500	99.000
6	Margaux Dandois	11.950	12.600	12.200	11.200	99.000
6	Jutta Verkest	12.400	13.000	11.300	12.350	99.000
7	Hungary	25.950	24.300	23.950	24.650	98.850
7	Mirtill Makovits	12.900	12.100	11.900	12.550	98.850
7	Hanna Szujó	13.050	12.200	12.050	12.100	98.850
8	Germany	25.750	24.750	23.100	25.000	98.600
8	Julia Birck	12.750	12.300	11.700	12.750	98.600
8	Jasmin Haase	12.150	12.450	11.200	12.250	98.600
8	Lea Quaas	13.000	11.250	11.400	11.600	98.600

=== Individual all-around ===
Rank	Gymnast	Vault (gymnastics)	Uneven bars	Balance beam	Floor (gymnastics)	Total
1st place, gold medalist(s)	(Russia) Viktoria Listunova	14.450	13.600	13.800	14.150	56.000
2nd place, silver medalist(s)	(United Kingdom) Ondine Achampong	13.600	13.250	13.200	12.900	52.950
3rd place, bronze medalist(s)	(Russia) Yana Vorona	13.950	12.150	12.950	13.500	52.550
4	(Romania) Ioana Stanciulescu	14.250	13.100	11.100	13.650	52.100
5	(France) Alizée Letrange-Mouakit	13.550	13.350	12.050	13.150	52.100
6	(Italy) Micol Minotti	13.300	12.100	12.750	12.950	51.100
7	(Romania) Silviana Sfiringu	14.100	11.050	12.250	13.250	50.650
8	(United Kingdom) Halle Hilton	13.450	11.900	11.850	13.200	50.400
9	(Belarus) Anastasiya Savitskaya	13.050	12.650	12.300	12.400	50.400
10	(Hungary) Mirtill Makovits	13.050	12.600	12.150	12.500	50.300
11	(Italy) Veronica Mandriota	14.100	11.800	11.650	12.700	50.250
12	(France) Mathilde Wahl	13.650	11.550	12.350	12.250	49.800
13	(Ukraine) Daria Murzhak	13.100	12.350	12.250	12.100	49.800
14	(Belgium) Jutta Verkest	12.550	13.200	11.350	12.650	49.750
15	(Germany) Julia Birck	12.400	12.100	12.100	13.050	49.650
16	(Hungary) Hanna Szujó	13.300	11.900	11.850	12.150	49.200
17	(Germany) Jasmin Haase	13.400	12.550	10.900	12.300	49.150
18	(Belarus) Tatiana Levchuk	12.700	13.050	11.100	12.250	49.100
19	(Denmark) Camille Rasmussen	13.300	12.100	10.200	12.050	47.650
20	(Switzerland) Lena Bickel	13.650	12.450	9.350	12.150	47.600
21	(Greece) Magdalini Tsiori	13.700	12.300	9.800	11.600	47.400
22	(Netherlands) Lisa van Rozen	13.100	10.900	10.200	11.950	46.150
23	(Poland) Isabel Sikon	13.400	9.100	11.200	11.700	45.400
DNF	(Netherlands) Marit Reijnders	—N/a	—N/a	11.600	11.750	Did not finish

=== Vault ===
Position	Gymnast	Vault 1				Vault 2				Total
Position	Gymnast	D Score	E Score	Pen.	Score 1	D Score	E Score	Pen.	Score 2	Total
1st place, gold medalist(s)	(Russia) Viktoria Listunova	5.400	9.100		14.500	4.600	9.233		13.833	14.166
2nd place, silver medalist(s)	(Ukraine) Anastasiia Motak	5.400	8.733		14.133	5.000	9.000		14.100	14.016
3rd place, bronze medalist(s)	(Romania) Silviana Sfiringu	5.400	9.133		14.533	5.000	8.733	0.300	13.433	13.983
4	(Russia) Yana Vorona	5.400	8.766		14.166	4.600	9.033		13.633	13.899
5	(Romania) Ioana Stanciulescu	5.400	8.333		13.733	4.600	9.333		13.933	13.833
6	(Italy) Veronica Mandriota	5.000	8.933		13.933	4.600	8.933		13.533	13.733
7	(Switzerland) Lilli Habisreutinger	4.600	9.033		13.633	4.400	9.100		13.500	13.566
8	(Turkey) Bilge Tarhan	4.600	8.700		13.300	4.600	8.933		13.533	13.416

=== Uneven bars ===
Rank	Gymnast	D Score	E Score	Pen.	Total
1st place, gold medalist(s)	(Russia) Viktoria Listunova	5.700	8.600		14.300
2nd place, silver medalist(s)	(Russia) Irina Komnova	6.000	7.733		13.733
3rd place, bronze medalist(s)	(Romania) Ioana Stanciulescu	5.100	8.266		13.366
4	(Ukraine) Daria Murzhak	5.600	7.433		13.033
5	(Switzerland) Lena Bickel	4.700	8.233		12.933
6	(Belgium) Jutta Verkest	4.900	8.000		12.900
7	(Belgium) Margaux Dandois	4.500	8.100		12.600
8	(Belarus) Tatiana Levchuk	4.000	6.466	0.300	10.166

=== Balance beam ===
Rank	Gymnast	D Score	E Score	Pen.	Total
1st place, gold medalist(s)	(United Kingdom) Ondine Achampong	5.300	8.366		13.666
2nd place, silver medalist(s)	(Romania) Silviana Sfiringu	5.400	7.966		13.366
3rd place, bronze medalist(s)	(France) Clarisse Passeron	5.100	7.900		13.000
4	(United Kingdom) Halle Hilton	5.200	7.700		12.900
5	(Italy) Veronica Mandriota	4.900	7.833		12.733
6	(Italy) Micol Minotti	5.100	7.533		12.633
7	(Russia) Viktoria Listunova	5.300	7.333		12.633
8	(France) Alizée Letrange-Mouakit	4.900	6.700		11.600

=== Floor ===
Rank	Gymnast	D Score	E Score	Pen.	Total
1st place, gold medalist(s)	(Russia) Viktoria Listunova	5.600	8.466		14.066
2nd place, silver medalist(s)	(Romania) Ioana Stanciulescu	5.600	8.033		13.633
3rd place, bronze medalist(s)	(Romania) Silviana Sfiringu	5.500	7.900		13.400
4	(Russia) Yana Vorona	5.200	8.166		13.366
5	(Italy) Micol Minotti	4.800	8.133		12.933
6	(Germany) Julia Birck	4.700	8.066		12.766
7	(Italy) Veronica Mandriota	4.800	7.966		12.766
8	(France) Alizée Letrange-Mouakit	4.800	7.566	0.100	12.266

== Qualification ==
=== Men's results ===
==== Individual all-around ====
Rank	Gymnast	Floor (gymnastics)	Pommel horse	Rings (gymnastics)	Vault (gymnastics)	Parallel bars	Horizontal bar	Total	Qual.
1	(Russia) Ivan Kuliak	13.950	13.200	13.700	14.200	14.050	12.900	82.000	Q
2	(Ukraine) Illia Kovtun	14.050	12.100	13.250	14.000	14.600	13.350	81.350	Q
3	(Russia) Mukhammadzhon Iakubov	13.450	13.250	13.450	14.100	13.700	13.050	81.000	Q
4	(Ukraine) Volodymyr Kostiuk	13.650	13.250	13.000	13.650	13.850	12.500	79.900	Q
5	(Ukraine) Nazar Chepurnyi	14.050	13.250	13.400	14.250	14.000	10.900	79.850	–
6	(Italy) Ivan Brunello	13.350	13.050	13.150	14.000	12.550	13.300	79.600	Q
7	(Romania) Robert Burtănete	13.500	12.800	13.150	13.700	13.400	12.000	78.550	Q
8	(Azerbaijan) Samad Mammadli	13.800	13.200	12.700	13.200	12.950	12.650	78.500	Q
9	(United Kingdom) Sam Mostowfi	13.700	12.450	12.950	13.900	12.650	12.700	78.350	Q
10	(United Kingdom) Raekwon Baptiste	12.300	13.000	13.250	14.450	12.800	12.500	78.300	Q
11	(Romania) Gabriel Burtănete	12.150	12.600	13.100	14.600	13.050	12.750	78.250	Q
12	(Hungary) Krisztián Balázs	13.700	10.650	13.350	13.100	13.400	13.350	77.550	Q
13	(Switzerland) Luca Bottarelli	12.850	12.300	13.500	13.300	13.100	12.500	77.550	Q
14	(Russia) Kirill Gashkov	12.200	12.800	13.250	14.200	13.150	11.900	77.550	–
15	(Switzerland) Mattia Piffaretti	13.100	12.100	13.450	13.800	12.700	12.350	77.500	Q
16	(Italy) Lorenzo Bonicelli	13.250	13.050	11.350	13.800	12.833	12.950	77.233	Q
17	(Belgium) Nicola Cuyle	13.100	12.750	12.900	13.950	12.050	12.250	77.000	Q
18	(France) Lucas Desanges	13.100	12.900	10.800	13.500	13.250	13.350	76.900	Q
19	(Germany) Willi Leonhard Binder	12.900	13.000	12.750	13.050	12.750	12.450	76.900	Q
20	(Switzerland) Florian Langenegger	13.050	11.350	13.400	14.100	12.200	12.550	76.650	–
21	(United Kingdom) Luke Whitehouse	13.500	11.500	12.350	13.800	13.050	12.300	76.650	–
22	(Turkey) Bora Tarhan	12.800	12.050	13.300	13.500	12.900	11.850	76.400	Q
23	(France) Leo Saladino	13.700	13.300	12.200	12.950	11.900	12.350	76.400	Q
24	(Belgium) Victor Martinez Marechal	12.100	12.600	12.400	13.900	12.950	12.450	76.400	Q
25	(Turkey) Emre Dodanli	13.850	11.200	12.350	14.150	12.700	12.050	76.300	Q
26	(Sweden) Marcus Stenberg	13.150	11.600	12.850	13.500	12.600	12.600	76.300	Q
27	(Italy) Lorenzo Minh Casali	13.050	13.350	13.400	12.800	12.550	11.100	76.250	–
28	(Germany) Pascal Brendel	12.600	12.000	12.800	13.000	13.400	12.050	75.850	Q
29	(Poland) Kacper Garnczarek	13.250	12.400	12.150	13.500	11.500	12.750	75.550	Q
30	(France) Arthur Ballon	12.700	10.800	12.750	13.950	13.000	12.250	75.450	–
31	(Bulgaria) Teodor Trifonov	12.600	12.050	12.900	12.850	12.600	12.300	75.300	R1
32	(Portugal) Jose Pedro Nogueira	13.650	11.200	12.950	12.550	12.550	12.200	75.100	R2
33	(Austria) Askhab Matiev	12.950	11.950	12.700	13.000	12.400	12.100	75.100	R3

==== Floor ====
Rank	Gymnast	D Score	E Score	Pen.	Total	Qual.
1	(Ukraine) Illia Kovtun	5.100	8.950		14.050	Q
2	(Ukraine) Nazar Chepurnyi	5.200	8.850		14.050	Q
3	(Russia) Ivan Kuliak	4.900	9.050		13.950	Q
4	(Turkey) Emre Dodanli	4.900	8.950		13.850	Q
5	(Azerbaijan) Samad Mammadli	4.800	9.000		13.800	Q
6	(Hungary) Krisztián Balázs	4.900	8.800		13.700	Q
6	(France) Leo Saladino	4.900	8.800		13.700	Q
8	(United Kingdom) Sam Mostowfi	5.000	8.700		13.700	Q
9	(Portugal) Jose Pedro Nogueira	4.900	8.750		13.650	R1
10	(Ukraine) Volodymyr Kostiuk	5.200	8.450		13.650	–
11	(Italy) Ivan Brunello	4.800	8.750		13.550	R2
12	(United Kingdom) Luke Whitehouse	4.600	8.900		13.500	R3

==== Pommel horse ====
Rank	Gymnast	D Score	E Score	Pen.	Total	Qual.
1	(Italy) Lorenzo Minh Casali	4.400	8.950		13.350	Q
2	(France) Leo Saladino	4.700	8.600		13.300	Q
3	(Russia) Mukhammadzhon Iakubov	4.500	8.750		13.250	Q
4	(Ukraine) Volodymyr Kostiuk	5.200	8.050		13.250	Q
5	(Ukraine) Nazar Chepurnyi	5.500	7.750		13.250	Q
6	(Russia) Ivan Kuliak	4.400	8.800		13.200	Q
7	(Azerbaijan) Samad Mammadli	4.600	8.600		13.200	Q
8	(Italy) Lorenzo Bonicelli	4.400	8.650		13.050	Q
9	(Italy) Ivan Brunello	4.500	8.550		13.050	–
10	(United Kingdom) Raekwon Baptiste	4.400	8.600		13.000	R1
11	(Germany) Willi Leonhard Binder	4.600	8.400		13.000	R2
12	(France) Lucas Desanges	4.300	8.600		12.900	R3

==== Rings ====
Rank	Gymnast	D Score	E Score	Pen.	Total	Qual.
1	(Russia) Ivan Kuliak	4.500	9.200		13.700	Q
2	(Switzerland) Luca Bottarelli	4.200	9.300		13.500	Q
3	(Switzerland) Mattia Piffaretti	4.200	9.250		13.450	Q
4	(Russia) Mukhammadzhon Iakubov	4.300	9.150		13.450	Q
5	(Italy) Lorenzo Minh Casali	4.300	9.100		13.400	Q
5	(Switzerland) Florian Langenegger	4.300	9.100		13.400	–
7	(Ukraine) Nazar Chepurnyi	4.500	8.900		13.400	Q
8	(Spain) Jorge Campana	4.200	9.150		13.350	Q
9	(Hungary) Krisztián Balázs	4.300	9.050		13.350	Q
10	(Turkey) Bora Tarhan	4.200	9.100		13.300	R1
11	(Greece) Stavros Gkinis	4.500	8.800		13.300	R2
12	(Russia) Kirill Gashkov	4.200	9.050		13.250	–
13	(United Kingdom) Raekwon Baptiste	4.500	8.750		13.250	R3
13	(Ukraine) Illia Kovtun	4.500	8.750		13.250	R3

==== Vault ====
Rank	Gymnast	Vault 1				Vault 2				Total	Qual.
Rank	Gymnast	D Score	E Score	Pen.	Score 1	D Score	E Score	Pen.	Score 2	Total	Qual.
1	(Romania) Gabriel Burtănete	5.200	9.400		14.600	5.200	9.100	0.100	14.200	14.400	Q
2	(United Kingdom) Raekwon Baptiste	5.200	9.250		14.450	4.800	9.100		13.900	14.175	Q
3	(Ukraine) Nazar Chepurnyi	5.200	9.050		14.250	5.200	7.950		13.150	13.700	Q
4	(Russia) Ivan Kuliak	4.800	9.400		14.200	4.000	9.200		13.200	13.700	Q
5	(Belgium) Victor Martinez Marechal	4.800	9.200	0.100	13.900	4.000	9.300		13.300	13.600	Q
6	(Romania) Robert Burtănete	5.200	8.800	0.300	13.700	4.800	8.700		13.500	13.600	Q
7	(Spain) Jorge Campana	5.200	8.850		14.050	4.000	9.050		13.050	13.550	Q
8	(United Kingdom) Sam Mostowfi	4.800	9.100		13.900	4.000	9.000		13.000	13.450	Q
9	(France) Arthur Ballon	4.800	9.150		13.950	5.200	7.800	0.100	12.900	13.425	R1
10	(Iceland) Jonas Thorisson	4.800	8.950		13.750	4.000	8.900		12.900	13.325	R2
11	(Greece) Alkinoos Graikos	5.200	9.100	0.100	14.200	3.200	9.150	0.100	12.250	13.225	R3

==== Parallel bars ====
Rank	Gymnast	D Score	E Score	Pen.	Total	Qual.
1	(Ukraine) Illia Kovtun	5.700	8.900		14.600	Q
2	(Russia) Ivan Kuliak	5.300	8.750		14.050	Q
3	(Ukraine) Nazar Chepurnyi	5.400	8.600		14.000	Q
4	(Ukraine) Volodymyr Kostiuk	5.400	8.450		13.850	–
5	(Russia) Mukhammadzhon Iakubov	5.000	8.700		13.700	Q
6	(Germany) Pascal Brendel	4.600	8.800		13.400	Q
6	(Romania) Robert Burtănete	4.600	8.800		13.400	Q
8	(Hungary) Krisztián Balázs	5.000	8.400		13.400	Q
9	(France) Lucas Desanges	4.500	8.750		13.250	Q
10	(Cyprus) Georgios Angonas	4.100	9.100		13.200	R1
11	(Russia) Kirill Gashkov	4.800	8.350		13.150	–
12	(Switzerland) Luca Bottarelli	4.600	8.500		13.100	R2
13	(Romania) Gabriel Burtănete	4.300	8.750		13.050	R3
13	(United Kingdom) Luke Whitehouse	4.300	8.750		13.050	R3

==== Horizontal bar ====
Rank	Gymnast	D Score	E Score	Pen.	Total	Qual.
1	(France) Lucas Desanges	4.400	8.950		13.350	Q
2	(Hungary) Krisztián Balázs	4.600	8.750		13.350	Q
3	(Ukraine) Illia Kovtun	5.000	8.350		13.350	Q
4	(Italy) Ivan Brunello	4.500	8.800		13.300	Q
5	(Russia) Mukhammadzhon Iakubov	4.400	8.650		13.050	Q
6	(Italy) Lorenzo Bonicelli	4.200	8.750		12.950	Q
7	(Russia) Ivan Kuliak	4.500	8.400		12.900	Q
8	(Poland) Kacper Garnczarek	3.900	8.850		12.750	Q
9	(Romania) Gabriel Burtănete	4.100	8.650		12.750	R1
10	(United Kingdom) Sam Mostowfi	4.000	8.700		12.700	R2
12	(Azerbaijan) Samad Mammadli	4.300	8.350		12.650	R3

=== Women's results ===
==== Individual all-around ====
Rank	Gymnast	Vault (gymnastics)	Uneven bars	Balance beam	Floor (gymnastics)	Total	Qual.
1	(Russia) Viktoria Listunova	14.250	14.150	12.950	14.200	55.550	Q
2	(Romania) Ioana Stănciulescu	14.400	13.150	12.800	13.350	53.700	Q
3	(United Kingdom) Ondine Achampong	13.500	12.500	13.450	12.700	52.150	Q
4	(Romania) Silviana Sfiringu	14.450	11.350	13.150	13.050	52.000	Q
5	(Russia) Yana Vorona	14.100	12.600	12.200	13.100	52.000	Q
6	(Italy) Veronica Mandriota	13.600	11.950	12.900	12.850	51.300	Q
7	(United Kingdom) Halle Hilton	13.400	12.200	13.350	12.250	51.200	Q
8	(Russia) Irina Komnova	13.500	13.100	11.550	13.000	51.150	–
9	(United Kingdom) Annie Young	13.300	12.400	12.750	12.550	51.000	–
10	(Italy) Micol Minotti	13.300	11.550	13.000	12.850	50.700	Q
11	(Greece) Magdalini Tsiori	13.300	12.600	12.350	12.350	50.600	Q
12	(Romania) Antonia Duță	12.750	12.450	12.350	12.950	50.500	–
13	(France) Alizée Letrange-Mouakit	11.750	12.400	13.200	12.850	50.200	Q
14	(Italy) Chiara Vincenzi	13.150	12.400	11.800	12.750	50.100	–
15	(France) Mathilde Wahl	13.650	11.600	12.250	12.100	49.600	Q
16	(Germany) Julia Birck	12.750	12.300	11.700	12.750	49.500	Q
17	(Hungary) Mirtill Makovits	12.900	12.100	11.900	12.550	49.450	Q
18	(Hungary) Hanna Szujó	13.050	12.200	12.050	12.100	49.400	Q
19	(Netherlands) Marit Reijnders	12.750	12.100	12.550	11.900	49.300	Q
20	(Ukraine) Daria Murzhak	12.800	12.700	12.050	11.600	49.150	Q
21	(Belarus) Anastasiya Savitskaya	12.800	12.500	12.150	11.700	49.150	Q
22	(Belgium) Jutta Verkest	12.400	13.000	11.300	12.350	49.050	Q
23	(Poland) Isabel Sikon	13.250	11.550	12.000	12.250	49.050	Q
24	(Switzerland) Lena Bickel	13.500	12.650	11.550	11.100	48.800	Q
25	(Netherlands) Lisa van Rozen	13.000	12.050	11.600	12.050	48.700	Q
26	(Belarus) Tatiana Levchuk	12.500	12.650	11.150	12.350	48.650	Q
27	(Denmark) Camille Rasmussen	13.350	11.100	12.400	11.600	48.450	Q
28	(Germany) Jasmin Haase	12.150	12.450	11.200	12.250	48.050	Q
29	(Belgium) Margaux Dandois	11.950	12.600	12.200	11.200	47.950	R1
30	(Spain) Claudia Villalba	13.200	12.050	11.300	11.350	47.900	R2
31	(Spain) Berta Pujadas	13.250	11.200	11.900	11.400	47.750	R3

==== Vault ====
Rank	Gymnast	Vault 1				Vault 2				Total	Qual.
Rank	Gymnast	D Score	E Score	Pen.	Score 1	D Score	E Score	Pen.	Score 2	Total	Qual.
1	(Romania) Ioana Stănciulescu	5.400	9.000		14.400	4.600	9.000		13.600	14.000	Q
2	(Romania) Silviana Sfiringu	5.400	9.050		14.450	4.600	8.900		13.500	13.975	Q
3	(Ukraine) Anastasiia Motak	5.400	8.800		14.200	5.000	8.750		13.750	13.975	Q
4	(Russia) Viktoria Listunova	5.400	8.850		14.250	4.600	9.000		13.600	13.925	Q
5	(Russia) Yana Vorona	5.400	8.700		14.100	4.600	8.900		13.500	13.800	Q
6	(Switzerland) Lilli Habisreutinger	4.600	8.750		13.350	4.400	8.850		13.250	13.300	Q
7	(Turkey) Bilge Tarhan	4.600	8.700		13.300	4.600	8.700		13.300	13.300	Q
8	(Italy) Veronica Mandriota	5.000	8.700	0.100	13.600	4.600	8.400	0.100	12.900	13.250	Q
9	(Turkey) Cemre Kendirci	4.600	8.550		13.150	4.800	8.400		13.200	13.175	R1
10	(Russia) Irina Komnova	4.600	8.900		13.500	4.000	8.800		12.800	13.150	–
11	(Greece) Magdalini Tsiori	4.600	8.700		13.300	4.200	8.800		13.000	13.150	R2
12	(United Kingdom) Halle Hilton	4.600	8.800		13.400	4.000	8.850		12.850	13.125	R3

==== Uneven bars ====
Rank	Gymnast	D Score	E Score	Pen.	Total	Qual.
1	(Russia) Viktoria Listunova	5.700	8.450		14.150	Q
2	(Romania) Ioana Stănciulescu	5.100	8.050		13.150	Q
3	(Russia) Irina Komnova	5.900	7.200		13.100	Q
4	(Belgium) Jutta Verkest	4.900	8.100		13.000	Q
5	(Ukraine) Daria Murzhak	5.600	7.100		12.700	Q
6	(Switzerland) Lena Bickel	4.600	8.050		12.650	Q
7	(Belarus) Tatiana Levchuk	5.100	7.550		12.650	Q
8	(Belgium) Margaux Dandois	4.500	8.100		12.600	Q
9	(Russia) Yana Vorona	5.000	7.600		12.600	–
10	(Greece) Magdalini Tsiori	5.300	7.300		12.600	R1
11	(Switzerland) Lou Steffen	4.800	7.750		12.550	R2
12	(Belarus) Anastasiya Savitskaya	4.600	7.900		12.500	R3

==== Balance beam ====
Rank	Gymnast	D Score	E Score	Pen.	Total	Qual.
1	(United Kingdom) Ondine Achampong	5.000	8.450		13.450	Q
2	(United Kingdom) Halle Hilton	5.300	8.050		13.350	Q
3	(France) Clarisse Passeron	5.100	8.200		13.300	Q
4	(France) Alizée Letrange-Mouakit	4.900	8.300		13.200	Q
5	(Romania) Silviana Sfiringu	5.200	7.950		13.150	Q
6	(Italy) Micol Minotti	5.100	7.900		13.000	Q
7	(Russia) Viktoria Listunova	5.300	7.650		12.950	Q
8	(Italy) Veronica Mandriota	4.800	8.100		12.900	Q
9	(Romania) Ioana Stănciulescu	5.100	7.700		12.800	R1
10	(United Kingdom) Annie Young	4.900	7.850		12.750	–
11	(Netherlands) Marit Reijnders	4.700	7.850		12.550	R2
12	(Denmark) Camille Rasmussen	4.500	7.900		12.400	R3

==== Floor ====
Rank	Gymnast	D Score	E Score	Pen.	Total	Qual.
1	(Russia) Viktoria Listunova	5.600	8.600		14.200	Q
2	(Romania) Ioana Stănciulescu	5.600	7.750		13.350	Q
3	(Russia) Yana Vorona	5.200	7.900		13.100	Q
4	(Romania) Silviana Sfiringu	5.600	7.450		13.050	Q
5	(Russia) Irina Komnova	5.300	7.700		13.000	–
6	(Romania) Antonia Duță	5.000	7.950		12.950	–
7	(France) Alizée Letrange-Mouakit	4.900	8.250	0.300	12.850	Q
8	(Italy) Veronica Mandriota	4.800	8.050		12.850	Q
8	(Italy) Micol Minotti	4.800	8.050		12.850	Q
10	(Germany) Julia Birck	4.800	7.950		12.750	Q
11	(Italy) Chiara Vincenzi	4.900	7.850		12.750	–
12	(United Kingdom) Ondine Achampong	4.700	8.000		12.700	R1
13	(Hungary) Mirtill Makovits	4.500	8.050		12.550	R2
14	(France) Clarisse Passeron	4.700	7.850		12.550	R3
