= Antonia Duță =

Romanian artistic gymnast

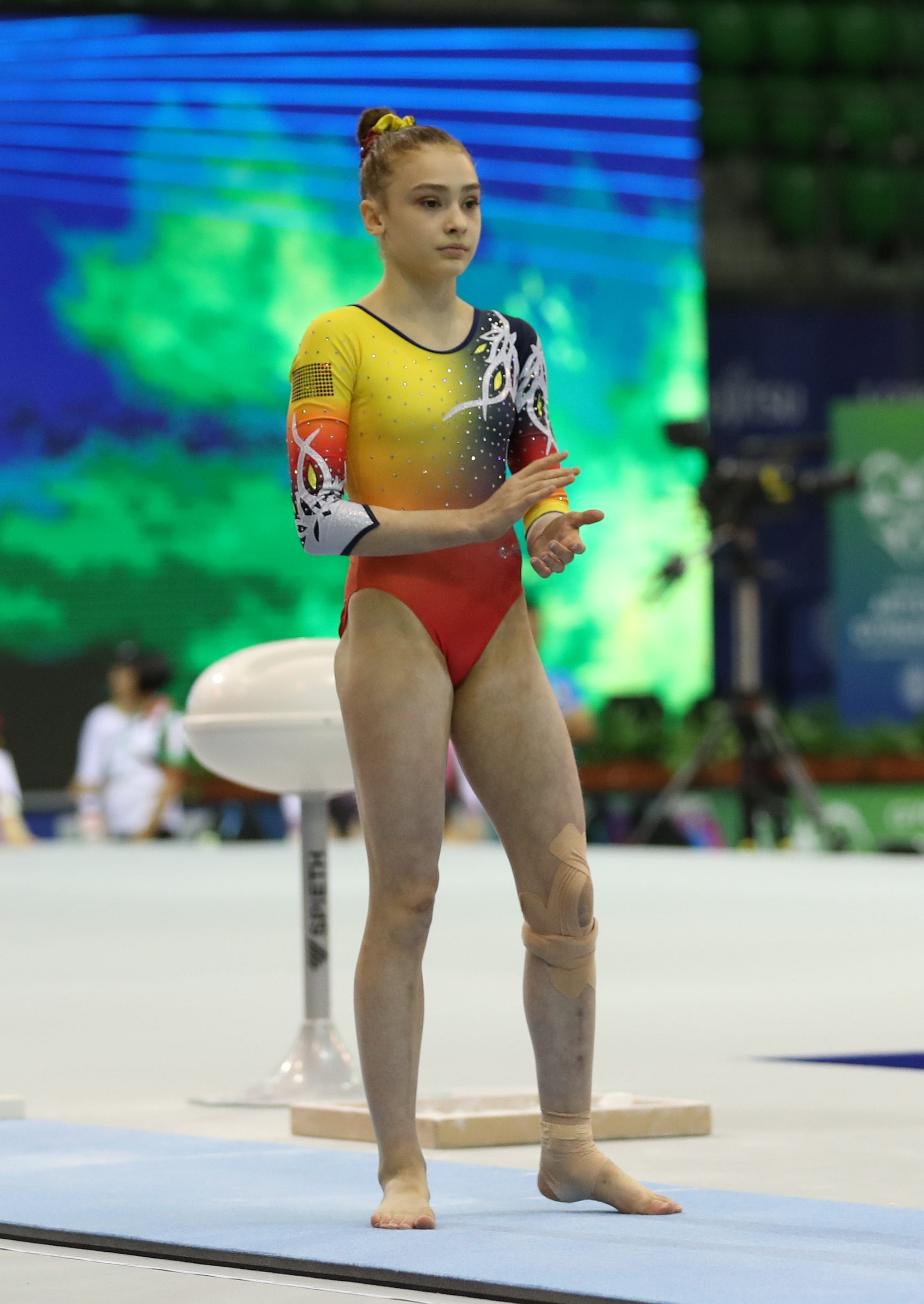
- Duță at the 2019 Junior World Championships

Personal information
- Full name: Irina Antonia Duţă
- Born: 8 October 2004 (age 21) Bucharest, Romania

Gymnastics career
- Discipline: Women's artistic gymnastics
- Country represented: Romania (2018–2023)
- Club: CS Dinamo Bucuresti
- Head coaches: The Moldovans (Coordinator: Nicolae Forminte)
Medal record
Representing Romania
European Championships
Silver medal – second place	2020 Mersin	Team

Irina Antonia Duţă (born 8 October 2004) is a Romanian artistic gymnast. She was a member of the Romanian teams who competed at the inaugural Junior World Championships and who won silver at the 2020 European Championships.

== Junior career ==
=== 2017 ===
In 2017, Duță had her junior elite debut, competing at the 2017 Romanian Junior Championships where she won a bronze medal for her level (Junior II Level 4) with an AA (all-around) score of 51.130. She also won the gold medal for her uneven bars routine.

=== 2018 ===
In April 2018, Duță competed in Jesolo, Italy at the 2018 City of Jesolo Trophy, placing 6th with the team (Iulia Berar, Silviana Sfiringu, Ana Maria Puiu). In July, Duță won the gold for her beam and led the team to victory at the Izvorani Friendly where she was also the 2nd best AA. She then had her biggest competition so far in Glasgow, Scotland at the 2018 European Championships with teammates Ioana Stănciulescu, Daniela Trică, Silviana Sfiringu and Ana Maria Puiu. They finished 4th as a team. Duță also made the floor final with a score of 13.266, and in the final she placed 4th with a 12.9. In October she competed at the national competition at the age of 14, where she won the floor silver medal. Duță finished her 2018 at the 2018 Top Gym Tournament where she won floor.

=== 2019 ===
2019 was the last junior year for Duță. Her first competition was the 2019 FIT Challenge in Ghent, Belgium where she won gold with the junior team and silver with the seniors led by Denisa Golgotă. At the 2019 Romanian Junior Championships, Duță did not compete the AA due to injury but still had the 3rd best score on the uneven bars. In June at the 2019 Junior World Championships in Győr, Hungary, Duță and her team (Ioana Stănciulescu and Silviana Sfiringu) finished 4th despite having a total of 6 falls. At the 2019 European Youth Summer Olympic Festival she won team silver along with Silviana Sfiringu and Ioana Stanciulescu. Duță was out of the floor final due to the 2-per-country rule. At the 2019 Romanian Championships (September 6 through September 8) in Ploiești, Romania, Duță finished 5th in the All Around with a score of 51.400. In this meet she was also able to win the uneven bars bronze medal with Silviana Sfiringu taking the gold and Ioana Stanciulescu the silver.

== Competitive history ==
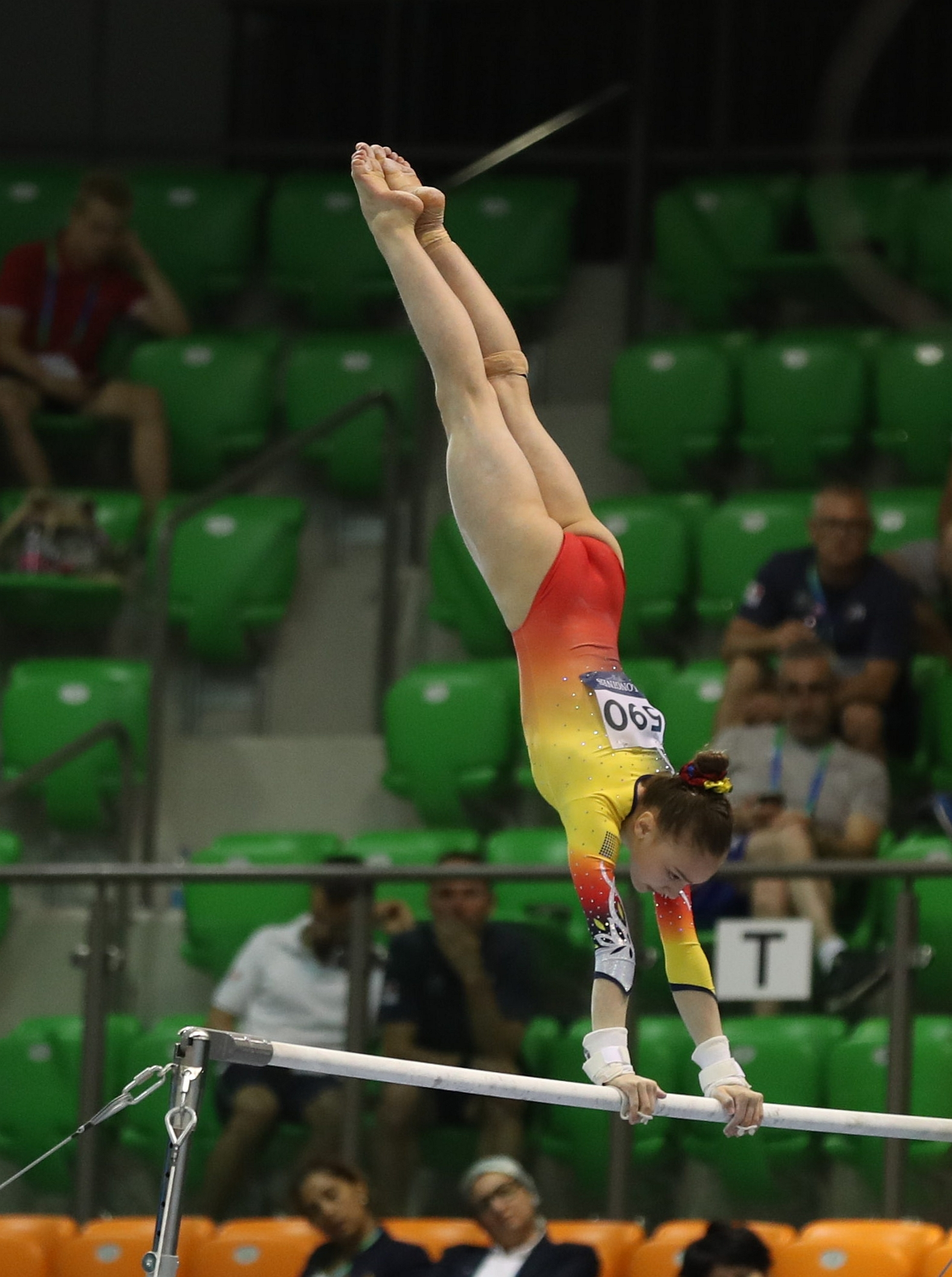
Duță at the 2019 Junior World Championships

Year	Event	Team	AA	VT	UB	BB	FX
Junior
2017	Romanian Junior Championships		3rd place, bronze medalist(s)		1st place, gold medalist(s)	6	
2018	City of Jesolo Trophy	6	33				
2018	Izvorani Friendly	1st place, gold medalist(s)	2nd place, silver medalist(s)		3rd place, bronze medalist(s)	1st place, gold medalist(s)	3rd place, bronze medalist(s)
2018	European Championships	4					4
2018	Romanian Championships	3rd place, bronze medalist(s)	8	5		8	2nd place, silver medalist(s)
2018	Top Gym Tournament		11		4		1st place, gold medalist(s)
2019	FIT Challenge	1st place, gold medalist(s)					
2019	Romanian Junior Championships				3rd place, bronze medalist(s)	2nd place, silver medalist(s)	
2019	Junior World Championships	4					
2019	European Youth Olympic Festival	2nd place, silver medalist(s)					
2019	Romanian National Championships	4	5		3rd place, bronze medalist(s)		5
Senior
2020	Romanian National Championships	2nd place, silver medalist(s)	6	4	2nd place, silver medalist(s)	3rd place, bronze medalist(s)	4
2020	European Championships	2nd place, silver medalist(s)					5
2021	FIT Challenge	8	16				4
2021	Koper Challenge Cup				7	6	
2022	Baku World Cup						4
2023	ESP-ROU-SWE Friendly	1st place, gold medalist(s)					
2023	RomGym Trophy	3rd place, bronze medalist(s)					
2023	Romanian Championships	3rd place, bronze medalist(s)	7		3rd place, bronze medalist(s)	6	4
