= Ivan Kuliak =

Russian artistic gymnast

Ivan Kuliak Иван Куляк
- Kuliak at the 2022 Doha World Cup

Personal information
- Nicknames: Vanyok, Vanya
- Born: 28 February 2002 (age 24)

Gymnastics career
- Discipline: Men's artistic gymnastics
- Country represented: Russia (2016–present)
- Club: Larisa Latynina School of Artistic Gymnastics / VFSO Dynamo
- Head coaches: Paramonov D.V., Nigmadzyanov R.G.

Ivan Vitalievich Kuliak (Note: Vitalyevich and Kulyak according to official transcription) (Russian: Иван Витальевич Куляк; born 28 February 2002) is a Russian artistic gymnast. He is the 2019 Russian Junior all-around and floor champion and the horizontal bar silver medalist. In March 2022, he gained notoriety for displaying a pro-invasion Z symbol during a medal ceremony, shortly after the beginning of the Russian invasion of Ukraine, for which he was issued with a one-year ban.

== Career ==
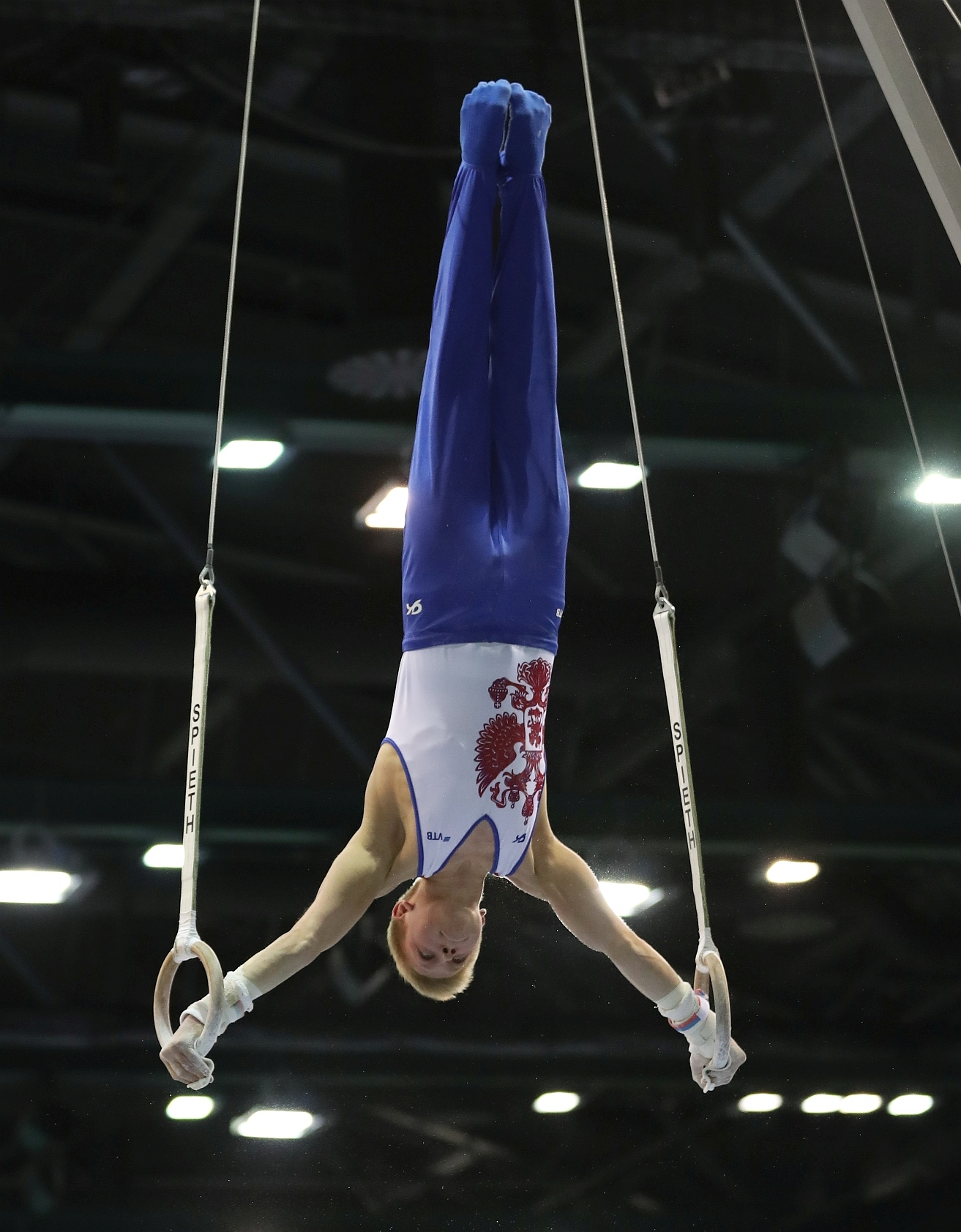
Kuliak in the still rings apparatus final at the 2019 Junior World Artistic Gymnastics Championships

Kuliak took up gymnastics at age 4 in 2006 in Kaluga, Russia, when his mother enrolled him in gymnastics classes.

In 2019 Kuliak became the Russian Junior all-around and floor champion and the silver medalist on horizontal bar.

He represented Russia at the 2019 European Youth Summer Olympic Festival and won the silver medal in the individual all-around, a bronze on floor and still rings and a silver medal as part of the Russian team. In 2019 he received the title Master of Sports.

=== 2022 World Cup controversy ===
In March 2022, Kuliak wore a "Z" sticker on his chest during the medal ceremony of the parallel bars competition at the 2022 FIG Artistic Gymnastics World Cup series in Doha. "Z", a letter which is not part of the Cyrillic alphabet, is a tactical marking used by Russian invading forces in Ukraine. Thus, it has become a pro-war symbol. Kuliak displayed the symbol while standing on the podium next to a Ukrainian athlete, Illia Kovtun, who won the event. The FIG prior to the competitions decided to exclude Russian athletes from the competitions, but the prohibition only entered in force on 7 March.

On 6 March the FIG announced that they will ask the Gymnastics Ethics Foundation to open disciplinary proceedings against Kuliak. In a subsequent interview, on Tuesday 8 March, Kuliak said that he had no regrets and would "do exactly the same". On 18 March, he appeared at the 2022 Moscow rally wearing an Olympic medal, though he has not competed in the Olympics.

On 17 May the FIG sanctioned Kuliak with a one-year ban, ending 17 May 2023 or six months after the ban on Russian athletes is lifted and ruled that he is to be stripped of his bronze medal and prize money.

On 14 September it was announced that Kuliak's appeal against his suspension was partially upheld. The Gymnastics Ethics Foundation (GEF) Appeal Tribunal found that the one-year sanctions should be independent from measures preventing Russian gymnasts from competing at FIG events. This means his suspension would last until May 16, 2023.

== Competitive history ==
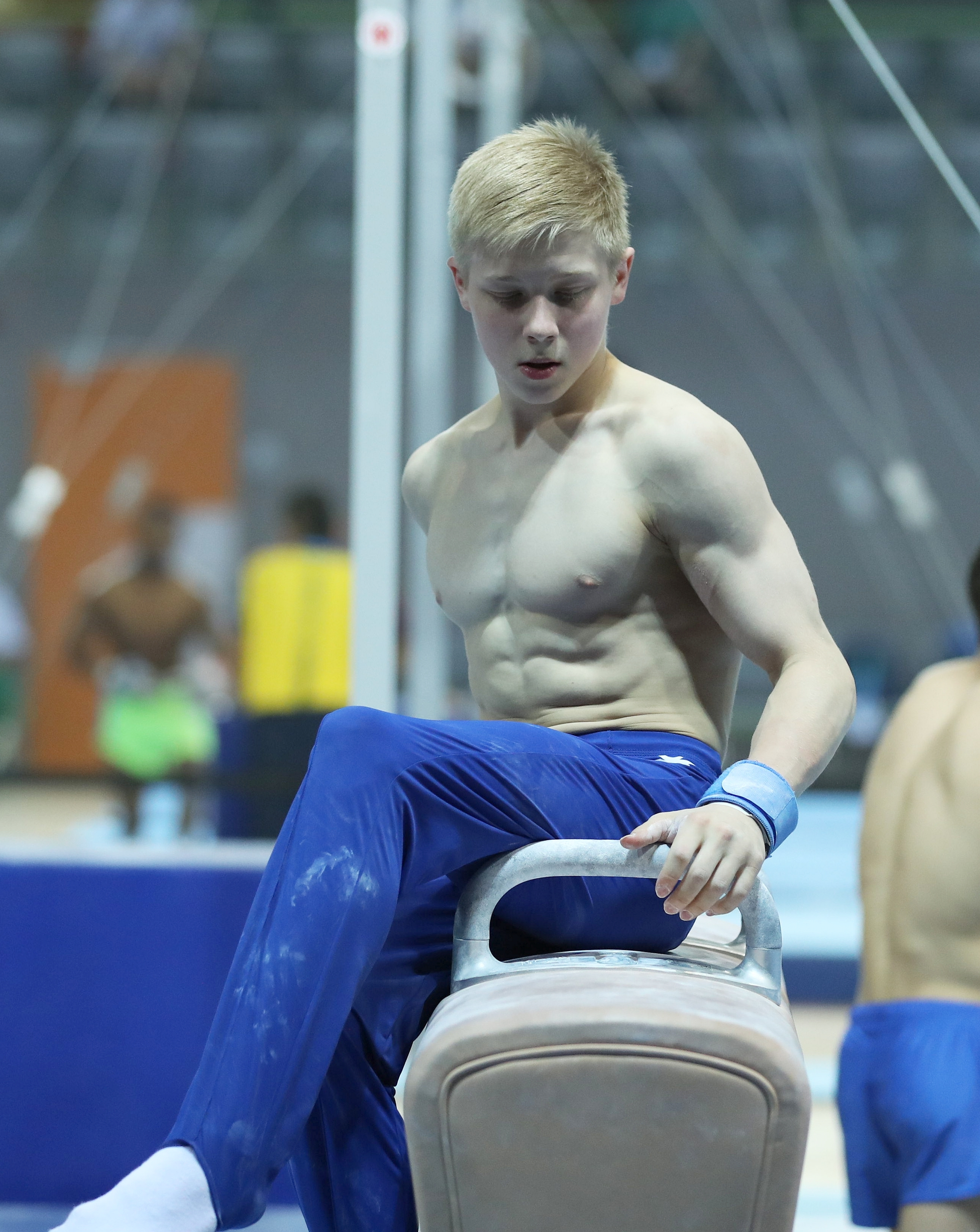
Pommel horse exercise during the boys' training at the 1st FIG Artistic Gymnastics Junior World Championships on the morning of 26 June 2019.

Year	Event	Team	AA	FX	PH	SR	VT	PB	HB
Junior
2014	Olympic Hopes Russia						2nd place, silver medalist(s)		
2015	Hope of Russia		2nd place, silver medalist(s)	5		3rd place, bronze medalist(s)	1st place, gold medalist(s)	6	3rd place, bronze medalist(s)
2015	Olympic Hopes Russia		5	4		2nd place, silver medalist(s)	1st place, gold medalist(s)		3rd place, bronze medalist(s)
2015	Youth Spartakiad	5	8				7	7	
2015	Kaluga Region Governor's Cup		3rd place, bronze medalist(s)						
2016	Youth Spartakiad	2nd place, silver medalist(s)	7	4		4	4	4	3rd place, bronze medalist(s)
2016	Kaluga Region Governor's Cup		1st place, gold medalist(s)	1st place, gold medalist(s)	3rd place, bronze medalist(s)	1st place, gold medalist(s)	1st place, gold medalist(s)	2nd place, silver medalist(s)	1st place, gold medalist(s)
2017	Central Federal Championships		6	3rd place, bronze medalist(s)		1st place, gold medalist(s)	8		1st place, gold medalist(s)
2017	Russian Junior Championships (CMS)	4	11	3rd place, bronze medalist(s)		5			8
2017	Prize of the Olympic Champion A. Nemov	2nd place, silver medalist(s)	2nd place, silver medalist(s)	1st place, gold medalist(s)	8	2nd place, silver medalist(s)		2nd place, silver medalist(s)	
2017	Youth Spartakiad	4	15	8					8
2017	Kaluga Region Governor's Cup		1st place, gold medalist(s)						
2018	Central Federal Championships	1st place, gold medalist(s)	3rd place, bronze medalist(s)	3rd place, bronze medalist(s)		1st place, gold medalist(s)		5	2nd place, silver medalist(s)
2018	Russian Junior Championships	6	7		6	2nd place, silver medalist(s)		2nd place, silver medalist(s)	
2018	Summer Youth Spartakiad	3rd place, bronze medalist(s)	6	4		10			6
2018	Sport School Championships	3rd place, bronze medalist(s)	1st place, gold medalist(s)	2nd place, silver medalist(s)		2nd place, silver medalist(s)		2nd place, silver medalist(s)	7
2018	Voronin Junior Cup		2nd place, silver medalist(s)			2nd place, silver medalist(s)		5	
2019	Russian Junior Championships	3rd place, bronze medalist(s)	1st place, gold medalist(s)	1st place, gold medalist(s)	7	7		5	2nd place, silver medalist(s)
2019	Hope of Russia		1st place, gold medalist(s)	1st place, gold medalist(s)		3rd place, bronze medalist(s)		1st place, gold medalist(s)	
2019	Memorial Erminio Visconti	1st place, gold medalist(s)	1st place, gold medalist(s)						
2019	Junior World Championships	9	11			7			
2019	Euro Youth Olympic Festival	2nd place, silver medalist(s)	2nd place, silver medalist(s)	3rd place, bronze medalist(s)	5	3rd place, bronze medalist(s)	7	7	5
2019	Central Federal Championships	1st place, gold medalist(s)	1st place, gold medalist(s)						
Senior
2020	Central Federal Championships	3rd place, bronze medalist(s)	3rd place, bronze medalist(s)			5			
2021	Central Federal Championships	3rd place, bronze medalist(s)	2nd place, silver medalist(s)		6			3rd place, bronze medalist(s)	2nd place, silver medalist(s)
2021	National Championships		5				8	7	5
2021	Russian Cup		12					3rd place, bronze medalist(s)	
2021	Kaluga Region Governor's Cup	2nd place, silver medalist(s)	2nd place, silver medalist(s)	7		2nd place, silver medalist(s)		1st place, gold medalist(s)	7
2022	Doha World Cup							DQ (Note: Kuliak was stripped of his bronze medal and prize money after being sanctioned for wearing pro-war symbolism on the medal podium)	
2022	National Championships	1st place, gold medalist(s)						7	
