= Daniela Trică =

Romanian artistic gymnast

- Born: 21 June 2004 (age 22) Bârlad, Romania

Gymnastics career
- Discipline: Women's artistic gymnastics
- Country represented: Romania (2017–2021)
- Club: CSS Bârlad
- Retired: 2021
Medal record
Representing Romania
European Championships
Silver medal – second place	2020 Mersin	Team

Daniela Trică (born 21 June 2004) is a Romanian retired artistic gymnast. She won a silver medal in the team competition at the 2020 European Championships.

== Gymnastics career ==
Trică competed as a junior from 2017 to 2019. She made her international debut at the 2017 Nadia Comaneci Invitational and won a gold medal in the team event. Individually, she won a silver medal on the floor exercise behind teammate Ioana Stănciulescu. At the 2017 Romanian Championships, she placed sixth in the all-around and fourth on the vault, balance beam, and floor exercise. She competed at the 2018 Junior European Championships alongside Stănciulescu, Silviana Sfiringu, Antonia Duță, and Ana Maria Puiu, and they finished fourth in the team competition. She then finished fourth in the all-around at the 2018 Romanian Championships, and she won the gold medal in the balance beam final. Additionally, she finished fourth in the vault final, seventh in the uneven bars final, and sixth in the floor exercise final.

Trică won the gold medal with the junior Romanian team at the 2019 FIT Challenge, and she won the gold medal on the floor exercise. At the 2019 Romanian Junior Championships, she won the all-around bronze medal behind Sfiringu and Stănciulescu. Then at the senior-level Romanian Championships, she won a silver medal on the balance beam behind Stănciulescu.

Trică started her senior career in 2020. In November, she made her senior debut at the Romanian Championships. She finished seventh in the all-around, won the bronze medal on vault, finished fourth on uneven bars, won silver on balance beam, and won bronze on floor. She was selected to make her senior international debut at the 2020 European Championships alongside Antonia Duță, Larisa Iordache, Silviana Sfiringu, and Ioana Stănciulescu. The team won the silver medal behind Ukraine, with Trică contributing on the balance beam.

Trică announced her retirement from the sport on her Instagram account on 28 April 2021.

== Competitive history ==
Year	Event	Team	AA	VT	UB	BB	FX
Senior
2020	Romanian National Championships		7	3rd place, bronze medalist(s)	4	2nd place, silver medalist(s)	3rd place, bronze medalist(s)
2020	European Championships	2nd place, silver medalist(s)					
