= Silviana Sfiringu =

Romanian artistic gymnast

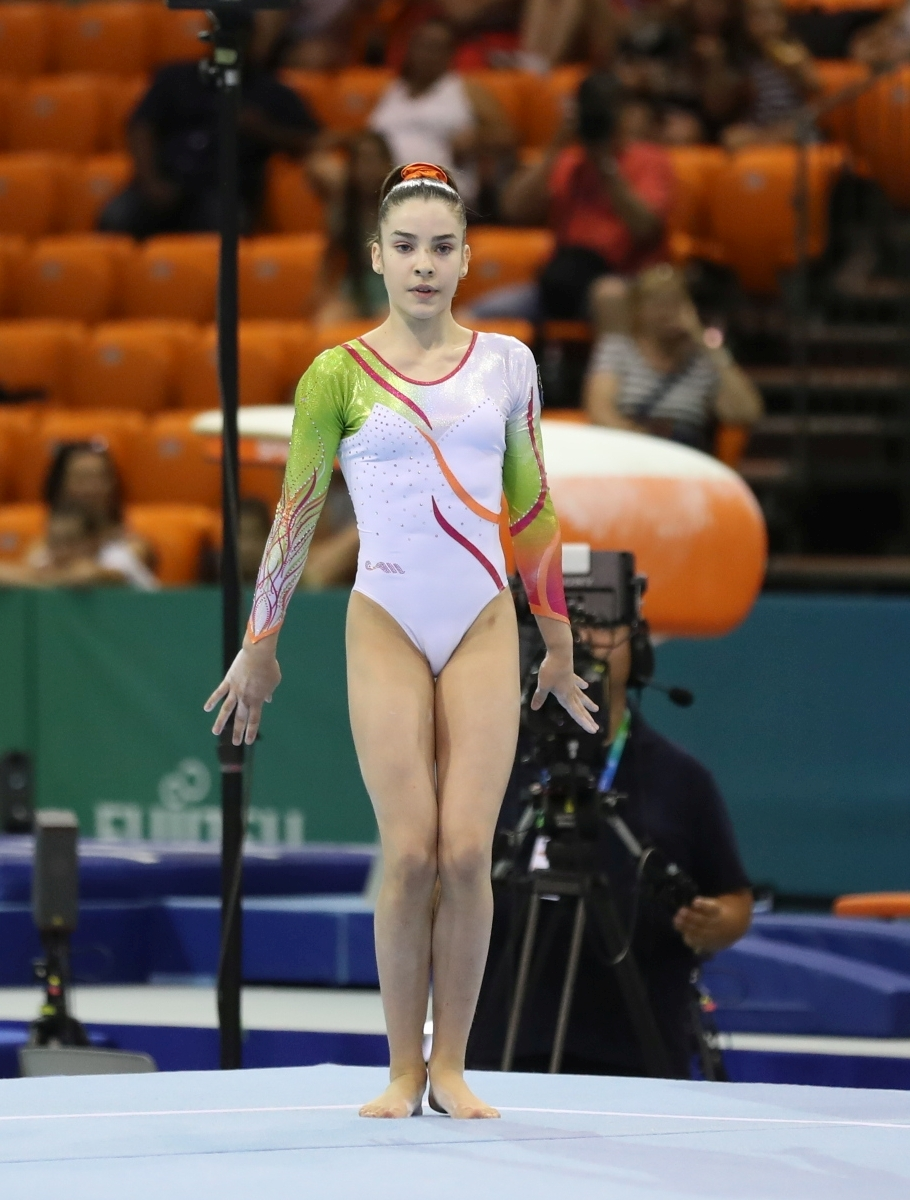
- Sfiringu at the 2019 Junior World Championships

Personal information
- Full name: Silviana-Maria Sfiringu-Gheorghe
- Born: 1 September 2004 (age 22) Medgidia, Romania

Gymnastics career
- Discipline: Women's artistic gymnastics
- Country represented: Romania; (2017–2023)
- Club: CS Farul Constanta
- Head coaches: Lucian Sandu, Gina Gogean
- Assistant coaches: Micu Ramona, Florin Uzum
Medal record
Representing Romania
Event	1st	2nd	3rd
European Championships	0	2	0
Total	0	2	0
European Championships
Silver medal – second place	2020 Mersin	Team
Silver medal – second place	2020 Mersin	Balance Beam

Silviana-Maria Sfiringu-Gheorghe (born 1 September 2004 in Medgidia, Romania) is a Romanian artistic gymnast.

During her junior career Sfiringu won the Romanian Junior Championships 3 times (2017, 2018 and 2019). She is a two-time senior national champion (2018 and 2020). She was the first junior gymnast in Romanian Gymnastics history to win the all-around national competition in 2018 when she was 14 years old, with Ioana Stănciulescu finishing second. At the 2019 Romanian Championships in Ploiești, Romania, Sfiringu and Stănciulescu repeated the historic moment, this time with Stănciulescu taking the gold and Sfiringu the silver medal. In November 2020 she became the 10th Romanian gymnast to win the title for the second time and the second after Simona Amânar to lose the title and re-win it a year later.

Sfiringu was the 2019 EYOF Team and Balance Beam silver medalist and Vault and Floor Exercise bronze medalist. At the 2020 European Women's Artistic Gymnastics Championships, she won a silver medal with the team and won the silver medal on balance beam.

== Junior career ==
=== 2017 ===
In 2017, when she was just 12 years old, Sfiringu made her junior elite debut, competing at the 2017 Romanian Championships. There, she was 8th in the All-Around with a score of 50.232. She won the bronze medal in vault and was 7th on floor exercise. Later that year she competed at the 2017 Romanian Junior Championships where she won her level (Junior II Level 4) with an AA (all-around) score of 53.430. She also won the silver medal on vault, uneven bars and balance beam and the bronze medal on floor. She finished her junior elite debut with her first international competition at the 2017 Top Gym Tournament that was held from November 25 through November 26 in Charleroi, Belgium. She placed 22nd in the AA with a total score of 46.700, 8th on vault and 6th on floor.

=== 2018 ===
In April 2018, Sfiringu competed in Jesolo, Italy at the 2018 City of Jesolo Trophy, placing 6th with the team (Iulia Berar, Antonia Duță, Ana Maria Puiu). She was 20th in the AA with 49.766, the second best Romanian after Berar who finished 12th. In May she went to Rabat, Morocco for the 2018 Gymnasiade and won 2 bronze medals (beam and floor). In July, Sfiringu won the gold on vault and led the team to victory at the Izvorani Friendly. She then had her biggest competition so far in Glasgow, Scotland at the 2018 European Championships with teammates Ioana Stănciulescu, Daniela Trică, Antonia Duta and Ana Maria Puiu. They finished 4th as a team. Sfiringu finished the AA in 7th with a score of 51.265. She also made the vault and beam finals, where she placed 5th and 6th, respectively.

In October, Sfiringu became first junior gymnast in Romanian Gymnastics history to win the all-around national competition at the age of 14, with a score of 53.600, after Larisa Iordache won the title 5 years in a row. There, she also won the team competition for CS Farul Constanta with Ioana Stanciulescu and Maria Holbura, vault, floor and the bronze for the uneven bars. Sfiringu finished her year at the 2018 Top Gym Tournament where she won vault.

=== 2019 ===
Sfiringu's first competition of the year was the 2019 FIT Challenge in Ghent, Belgium where she won gold with the junior team and silver with the seniors led by Denisa Golgotă. Sfiringu was 2nd in the AA to teammate Ioana Stănciulescu who won the competition. At the 2019 Romanian Junior Championships Sfiringu won her 3rd junior AA national title. In June at the 2019 Junior World Artistic Gymnastics Championships in Győr, Hungary, Sfiringu and her team (Ioana Stănciulescu and Antonia Duță) finished 4th despite having a total of 6 falls. Sfiringu also made the floor final where she placed 6th.

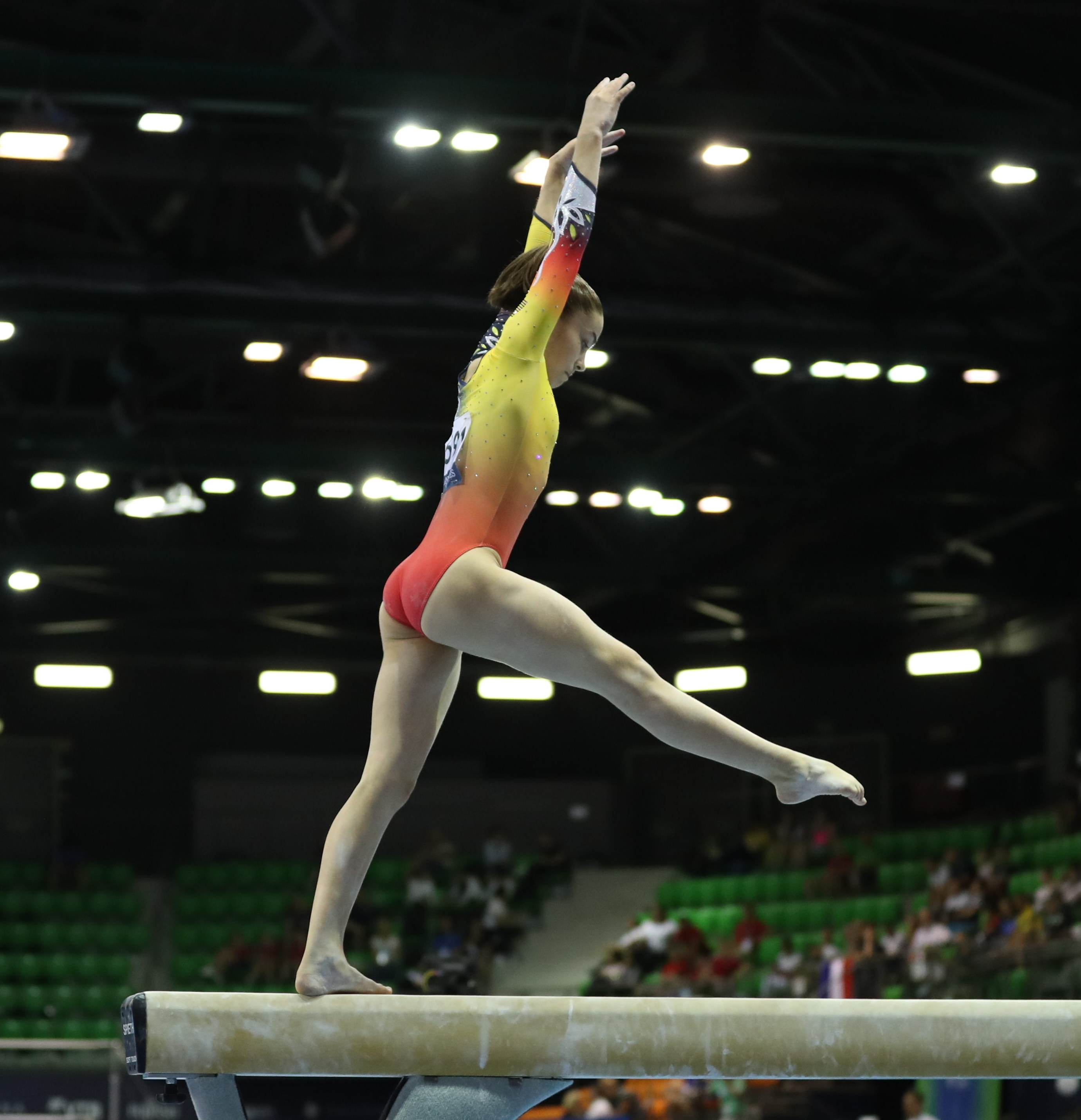
Team / All-Around Final

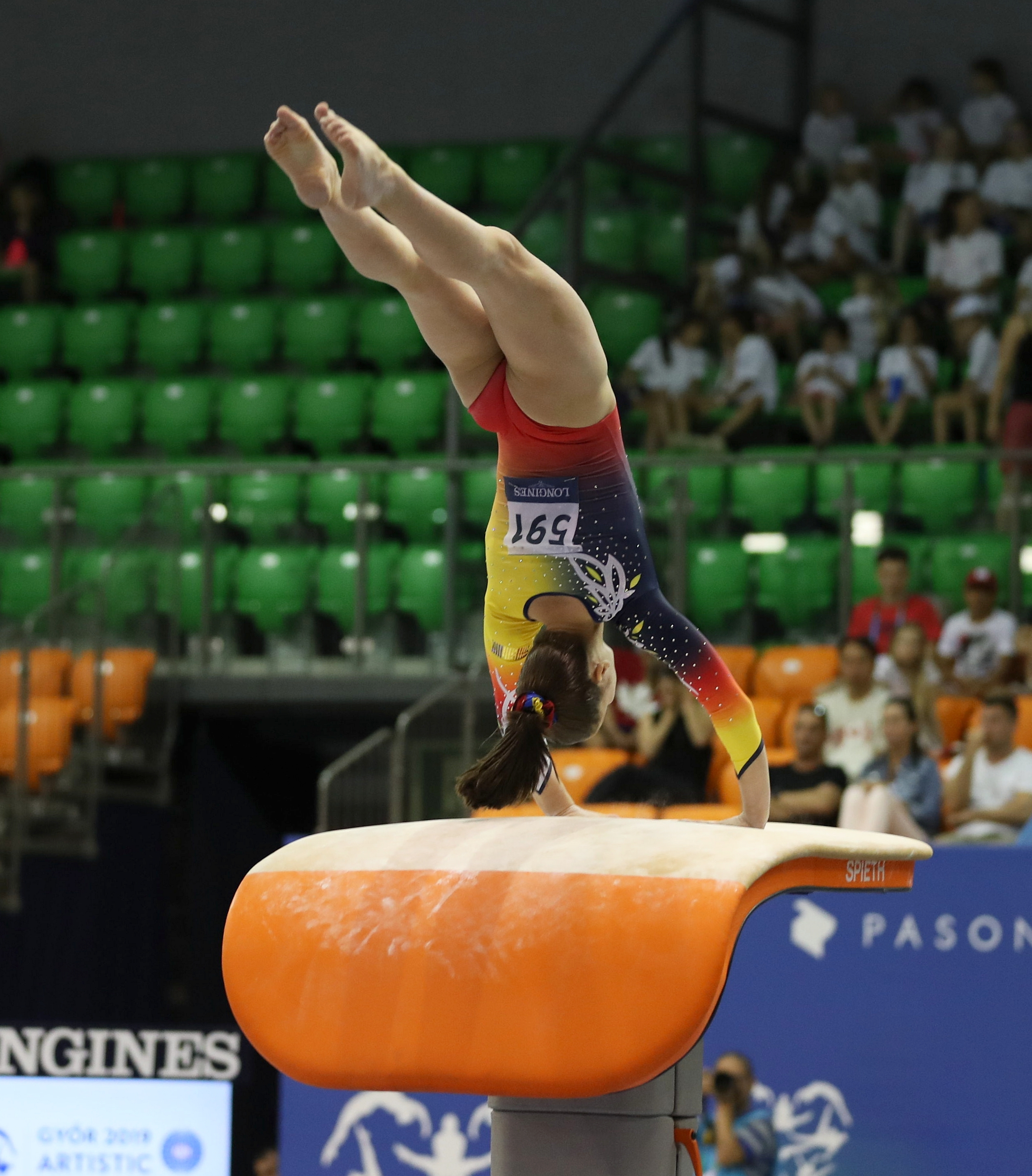
Team / All-Around Final

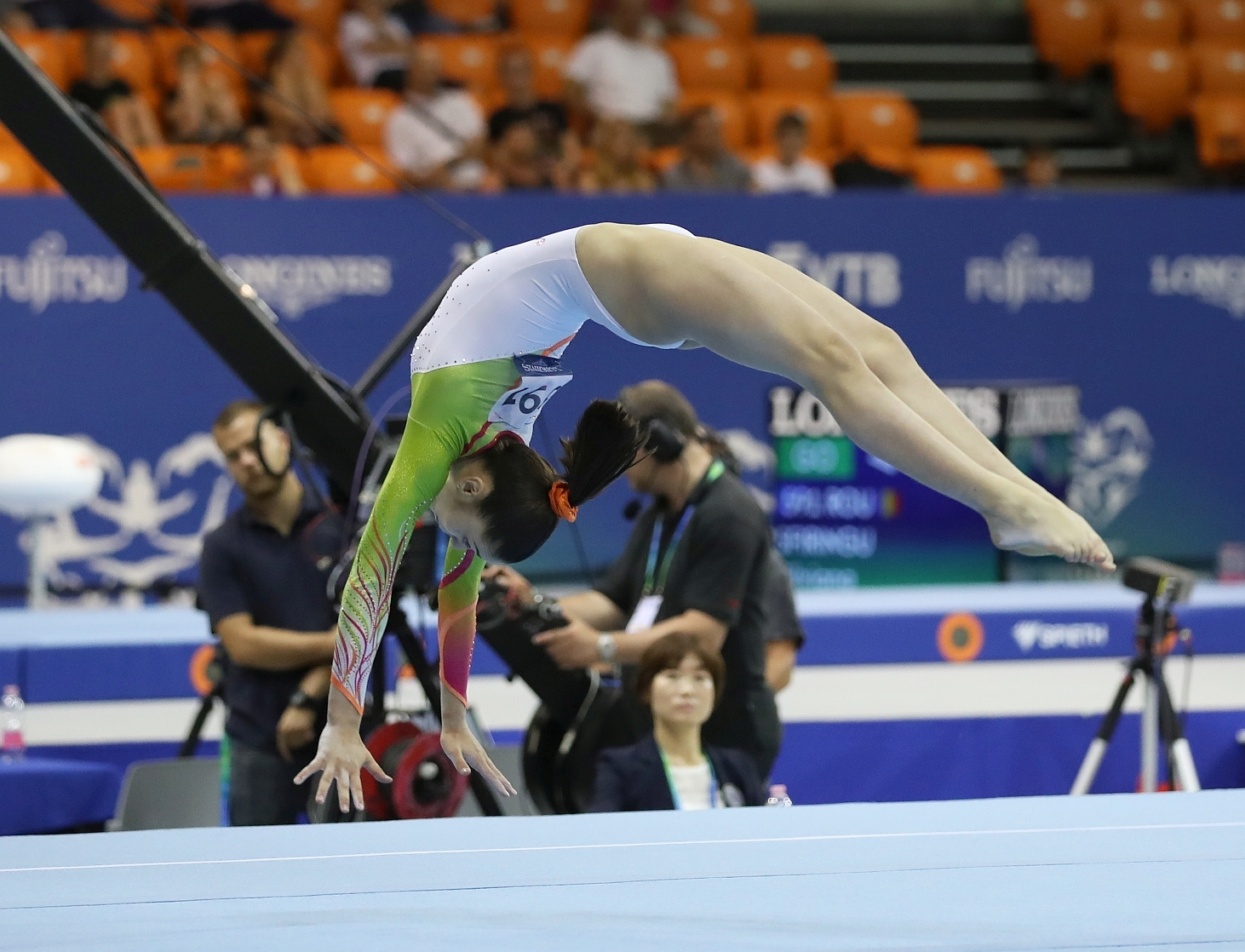
Floor Exercise Final

Sfiringu at the 2019 Junior World Championships

At the 2019 European Youth Summer Olympic Festival Sfiringu qualified to all apparatus finals except uneven bars, where she had a fall in qualification. In this meet she won silver with her team (behind Russia) and on balance beam (behind Ondine Achampong of Great Britain), as well as getting the bronze medal on vault and floor exercise.

At the 2019 Romanian Championships (September 6 through September 8) in Ploiești, Romania, Sfiringu won the silver medal in the all around with a score of 53.350. In this meet she also won the team and uneven bars gold medals and the balance beam bronze medal.

== Senior career ==
=== 2020 ===
In 2020, Sfiringu and teammates Antonia Duță, Daniela Trică and Ioana Stănciulescu turned senior, but due to the COVID-19 outbreak they were unable to compete early in the year. In May the FRG announced that Sfiringu, Ioana Stănciulescu and Maria Holbura moved to Izvorani to train with Liliana Cosma and Nicolae Forminte.

On 20 November, Sfiringu made her senior debut at the 2020 Romanian Nationals. There she became the Romanian All Around National Champion for the second time (being the 10th Romanian gymnast to do it). In this competition she also won the team competition with her gym CS Farul Constanta and with her team Maria Holbura and Ioana Stănciulescu. She also won vault for the second time. She won the bronze medal on uneven bars and the silver on floor.

In December, Sfiringu was announced as a member of the Romanian team for the 2020 European Women's Artistic Gymnastics Championships with Antonia Duță, Daniela Trică, Ioana Stănciulescu and Larisa Iordache. She won a silver medal with the team and also won the silver medal on balance beam.

=== 2021 ===
In 2021 the Romanian team camp was moved to Bucharest in order to "create a better team spirit" and provide better medical care.

Silviana was selected to compete at the 2021 European Championships where she would have a chance to qualify herself a nominative berth to the 2020 Olympic Games. However she and Ioana Stănciulescu were later replaced by the first year senior Mara Ceplinschi due to injury.

The Executive Committee of FRG reunited in May 2021 and voted to restructure the WAG team training. Duță and Stănciulescu decided to train in Bucharest with Iordache and Holbură (with coaches Lulu and Cristian Moldovan). Silviana Sfiringu in Deva, with the group coordinated by Lucian Sandu.

In the end of 2021 Silviana was a guest gymnast at the 2021 Romanian Junior National Championships.

=== 2022 ===
In April, after 1 year and 5 months of multiple injuries (cervical, ankle and COVID), Silviana Sfiringu competed at the 2022 Jesolo Trophy.

In June Silviana had her 1st World Challenge Cup where she competed the UB and BB and made the final in both events. In the bars final Sfiringu was able to get her 1st world cup medal by winning the bronze medal.

== Competitive history ==
Year	Event	Team	AA	VT	UB	BB	FX
Junior
2017	Romanian Championships	2nd place, silver medalist(s)	8	3rd place, bronze medalist(s)			7
2017	Romanian Junior Championships		1st place, gold medalist(s)	2nd place, silver medalist(s)	2nd place, silver medalist(s)	2nd place, silver medalist(s)	3rd place, bronze medalist(s)
2017	Top Gym Tournament	8	22	8			6
2018	City of Jesolo Trophy	6	20				
2018	Gymnasiade		12	5		3rd place, bronze medalist(s)	3rd place, bronze medalist(s)
2018	Izvorani Friendly	1st place, gold medalist(s)	1st place, gold medalist(s)	1st place, gold medalist(s)		2nd place, silver medalist(s)	
2018	European Championships	4	7	5		6	
2018	Romanian Championships	1st place, gold medalist(s)	1st place, gold medalist(s)	1st place, gold medalist(s)	3rd place, bronze medalist(s)	6	1st place, gold medalist(s)
2018	Top Gym Tournament		14	1st place, gold medalist(s)		4	
2019	FIT Challenge	1st place, gold medalist(s)	2nd place, silver medalist(s)				
2019	Romanian Junior Championships		1st place, gold medalist(s)	1st place, gold medalist(s)	2nd place, silver medalist(s)	2nd place, silver medalist(s)	2nd place, silver medalist(s)
2019	Junior World Championships	4	15				6
2019	European Youth Olympic Festival	2nd place, silver medalist(s)	7	3rd place, bronze medalist(s)		2nd place, silver medalist(s)	3rd place, bronze medalist(s)
2019	Romanian National Championships	1st place, gold medalist(s)	2nd place, silver medalist(s)		1st place, gold medalist(s)	3rd place, bronze medalist(s)	4
Senior
2020	Romanian National Championships	1st place, gold medalist(s)	1st place, gold medalist(s)	1st place, gold medalist(s)	3rd place, bronze medalist(s)	4	2nd place, silver medalist(s)
2020	European Championships	2nd place, silver medalist(s)				2nd place, silver medalist(s)	
2022	City of Jesolo Trophy	4					
2022	Osijek Challenge Cup				3rd place, bronze medalist(s)	5	
