= Ioana Stănciulescu =

Romanian artistic gymnast

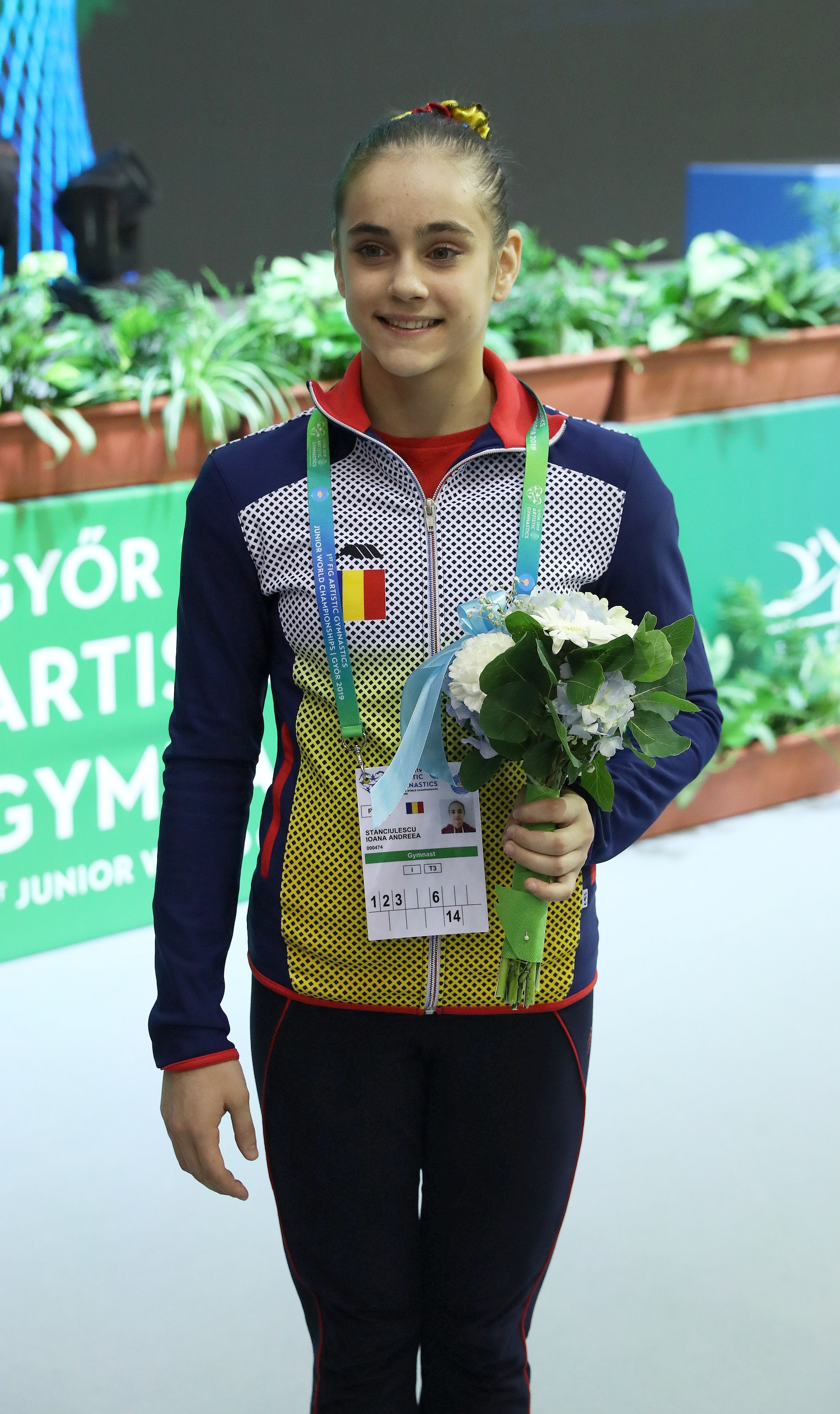
- Stănciulescu at the 2019 Junior World Championships

Personal information
- Full name: Ioana Andreea Stănciulescu
- Born: 18 February 2004 (age 22) Constanța, Romania

Gymnastics career
- Discipline: Women's artistic gymnastics
- Country represented: Romania (2017–present)
- Club: CS Farul Constanta
- Head coaches: Liliana Cosma; Florin Cotutiu
Medal record
Representing Romania
Event	1st	2nd	3rd
European Championships	0	1	0
Total	0	1	0
European Championships
Silver medal – second place	2020 Mersin	Team

Ioana Andreea Stănciulescu (born 18 February 2004) is a Romanian artistic gymnast. She competed as a junior from 2017 to 2019. Stănciulescu won the floor exercise at the 2018 European Championships. She was the 2019 European Youth Olympic Festival team and floor exercise silver medalist and uneven bars bronze medalist. At the 2019 Romanian National Championships, she won the gold medal in the all-around.

== Junior career ==
=== 2017 ===
In 2017, Stănciulescu made her junior elite debut, competing at the 2017 Nadia Comaneci Invitational. She was second in the all around (AA) with a score of 52.600 and helped win the team competition.

Later that year she competed at the 2017 Romanian Championships. She won the bronze medal on the balance beam.

=== 2018 ===
In June, Stănciulescu went to the Gym Festival Trnava in Trnava, Slovakia where she placed 2nd in the AA with a score of 51.300. At that meet Stănciulescu also won silver medals on the uneven bars and balance beam.

In July, Stănciulescu won the gold in the team competition at the Izvorani Friendly.

She then had her biggest competition so far in Glasgow, Scotland at the 2018 European Championships with teammates Silviana Sfiringu, Daniela Trică, Antonia Duță, and Ana Maria Puiu. They finished 4th as a team. Stănciulescu finished the AA in 6th with a score of 51.732. She also made the floor final, where she won with a score of 13.433 to win that title back to back for Romania, after Denisa Golgotă did the same in 2016.

In October Stănciulescu was second in the all-around national competition at the age of 14, with a score of 53.300. There she also won the team competition for CS Farul Constanta with Sfiringu and Maria Holbură. Due to injury she decided to skip the event finals.

=== 2019 ===
2019 was the last junior year for Stănciulescu. Her first competition was the 2019 FIT Challenge in Ghent, Belgium where she won gold with the junior team and silver with the seniors led by Golgotă. Stănciulescu also won the AA competition with a score of 52.432.

At the 2019 Romanian Junior Championships Stănciulescu was second in the AA.

In June at the 2019 Junior World Artistic Gymnastics Championships in Győr, Hungary, Stănciulescu and her teammates (Sfiringu and Duță) finished 4th despite having a total of six falls. Stănciulescu also made the beam and floor finals where she placed 5th and 8th.

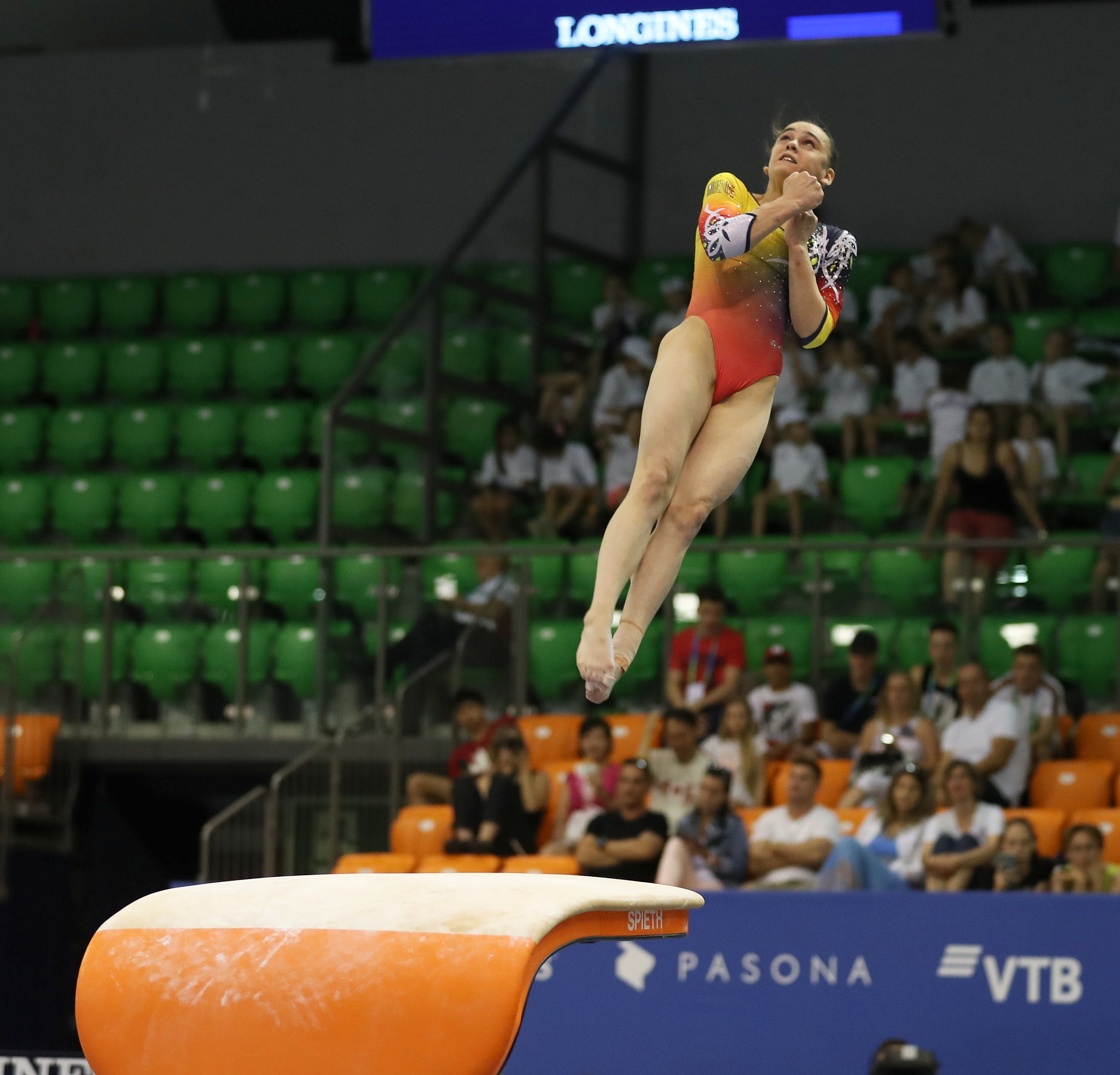
Team / All-Around Final

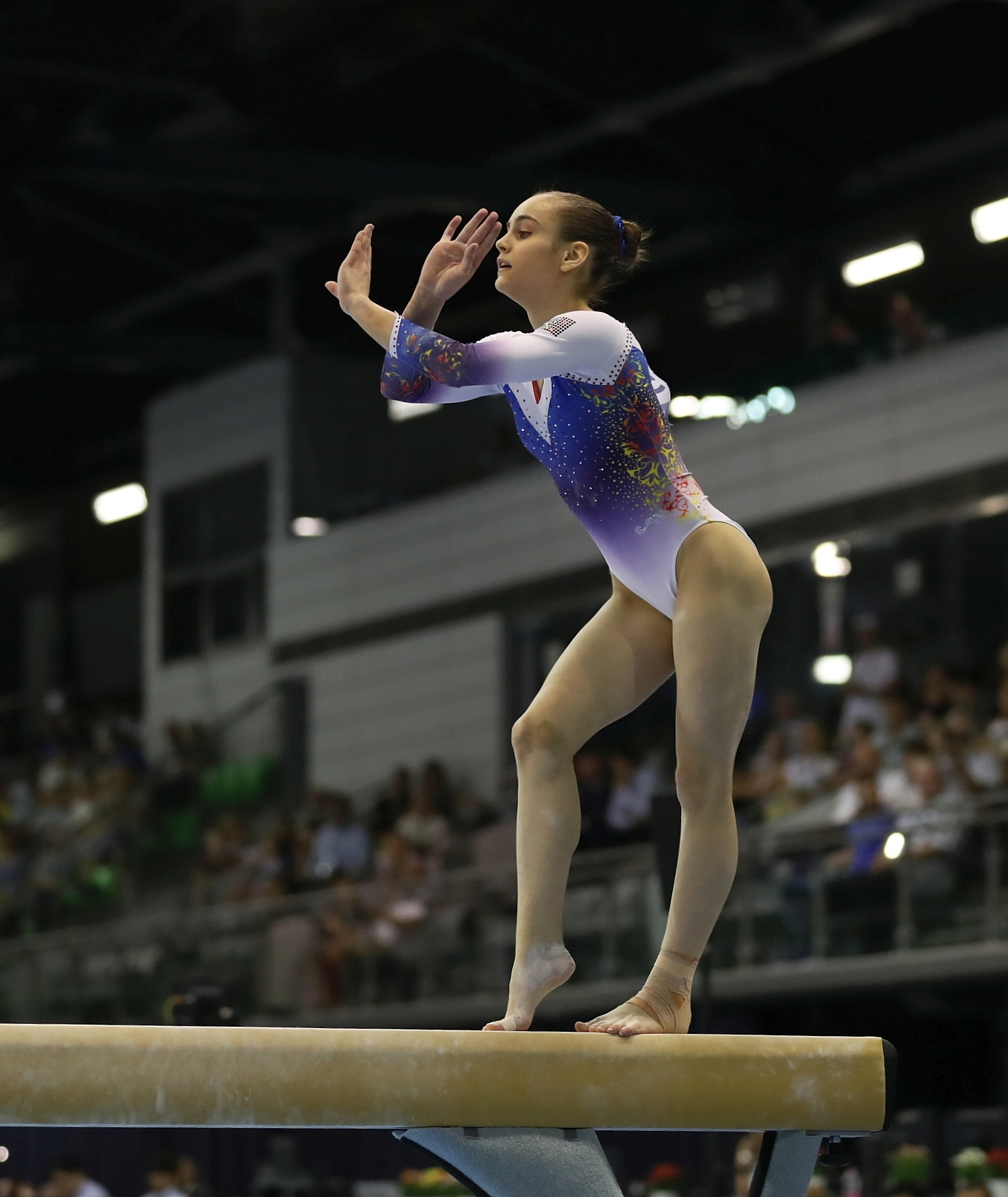
Balance Beam Final

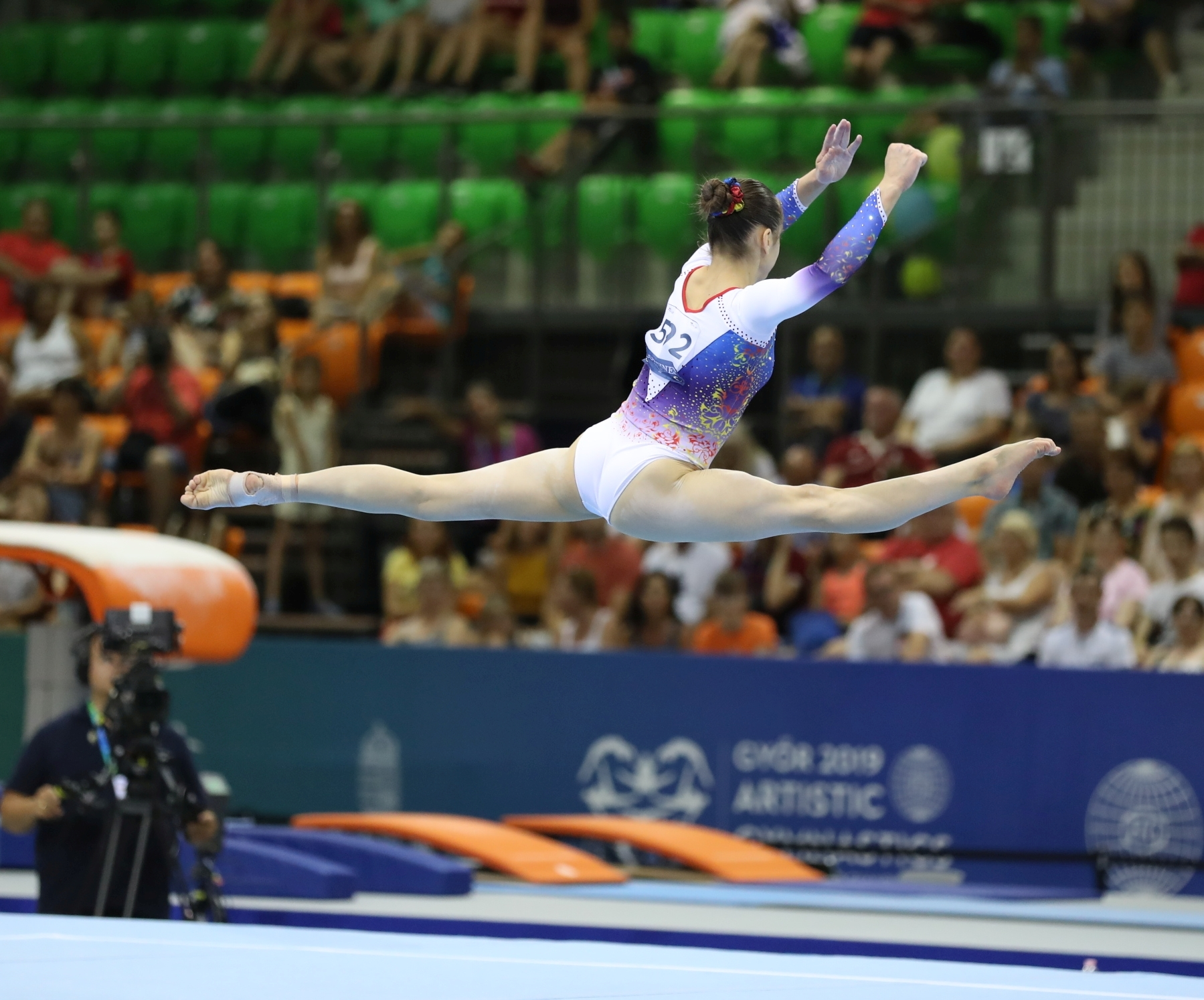
Floor Exercise Final

Stănciulescu at the 2019 Junior World Championships

At the 2019 European Youth Summer Olympic Festival Stănciulescu was able to make all of the finals except balance beam. At that meet she won silver for team and floor and bronze for uneven bars. She also qualified 2nd to the AA final but finished 4th after having a fall on the balance beam.

At the 2019 Romanian Championships (September 6 through September 8) in Ploiești, Stănciulescu won the all around with a score of 55.400. At that meet she also won the team, vault, balance beam, and floor exercise gold medals and the uneven bars silver medal.

== Senior career ==
=== 2020 ===
In 2020 Stănciulescu and teammates Antonia Duță, Daniela Trică, and Silviana Sfiringu turned senior. In May the FRG announced that Stănciulescu, Sfiringu, and Maria Holbură were moving to Izvorani, Romania to train with Liliana Cosma and Nicolae Forminte.

In December Stănciulescu was selected to represent Romania at the European Championships alongside Duță, Sfiringu, Trică, and Larisa Iordache. During the team final, Stănciulescu fell twice on uneven bars to earn a 9.800, Romania's lowest score that day. Romania won the silver medal, narrowly finishing behind Ukraine. Individually Stănciulescu finished fifth in the vault final.

=== 2021 ===
In 2021 the Romanian team camp was moved to Bucharest in order to "create a better team spirit" and provide better medical care.

Ioana was selected to compete at the 2021 European Championships where she would have a chance to qualify herself a nominative berth to the 2020 Olympic Games. However she and Silviana Sfiringu were later replaced due to injury.

The executive committee of FRG reunited in May 2021 and voted to restructure the WAG team training. Duță and Stănciulescu decided to train in Bucharest with Iordache and Holbură (with coaches Lulu and Cristian Moldovan).

== Competitive history ==
Year	Event	Team	AA	VT	UB	BB	FX
Junior
2017	Nadia Comaneci Invitational	1st place, gold medalist(s)	2nd place, silver medalist(s)	3rd place, bronze medalist(s)	3rd place, bronze medalist(s)	2nd place, silver medalist(s)	1st place, gold medalist(s)
2017	Romanian Championships	2nd place, silver medalist(s)				3rd place, bronze medalist(s)	
2018	Gym Festival Trnava		2nd place, silver medalist(s)	4	2nd place, silver medalist(s)	2nd place, silver medalist(s)	
2018	Izvorani Friendly	1st place, gold medalist(s)	3rd place, bronze medalist(s)	2nd place, silver medalist(s)	2nd place, silver medalist(s)		
2018	European Championships	4	6				1st place, gold medalist(s)
2018	Romanian Championships	1st place, gold medalist(s)	2nd place, silver medalist(s)				
2019	FIT Challenge	1st place, gold medalist(s)	1st place, gold medalist(s)				
2019	Romanian Junior Championships		2nd place, silver medalist(s)	3rd place, bronze medalist(s)	1st place, gold medalist(s)	1st place, gold medalist(s)	1st place, gold medalist(s)
2019	Junior World Championships	4	8			5	8
2019	Euro Youth Olympic Festival	2nd place, silver medalist(s)	4	5	3rd place, bronze medalist(s)		2nd place, silver medalist(s)
2019	Romanian National Championships	1st place, gold medalist(s)	1st place, gold medalist(s)	1st place, gold medalist(s)	2nd place, silver medalist(s)	1st place, gold medalist(s)	1st place, gold medalist(s)
Senior
2020	Romanian National Championships	1st place, gold medalist(s)	3rd place, bronze medalist(s)	2nd place, silver medalist(s)	1st place, gold medalist(s)	1st place, gold medalist(s)	1st place, gold medalist(s)
2020	European Championships	2nd place, silver medalist(s)		5			
2022	Baku World Cup			6	7	5	
2022	City of Jesolo Trophy	4	8			4	3rd place, bronze medalist(s)
2022	Varna Challenge Cup				3rd place, bronze medalist(s)	4	
