= Krisztián Balázs =

Hungarian artistic gymnast

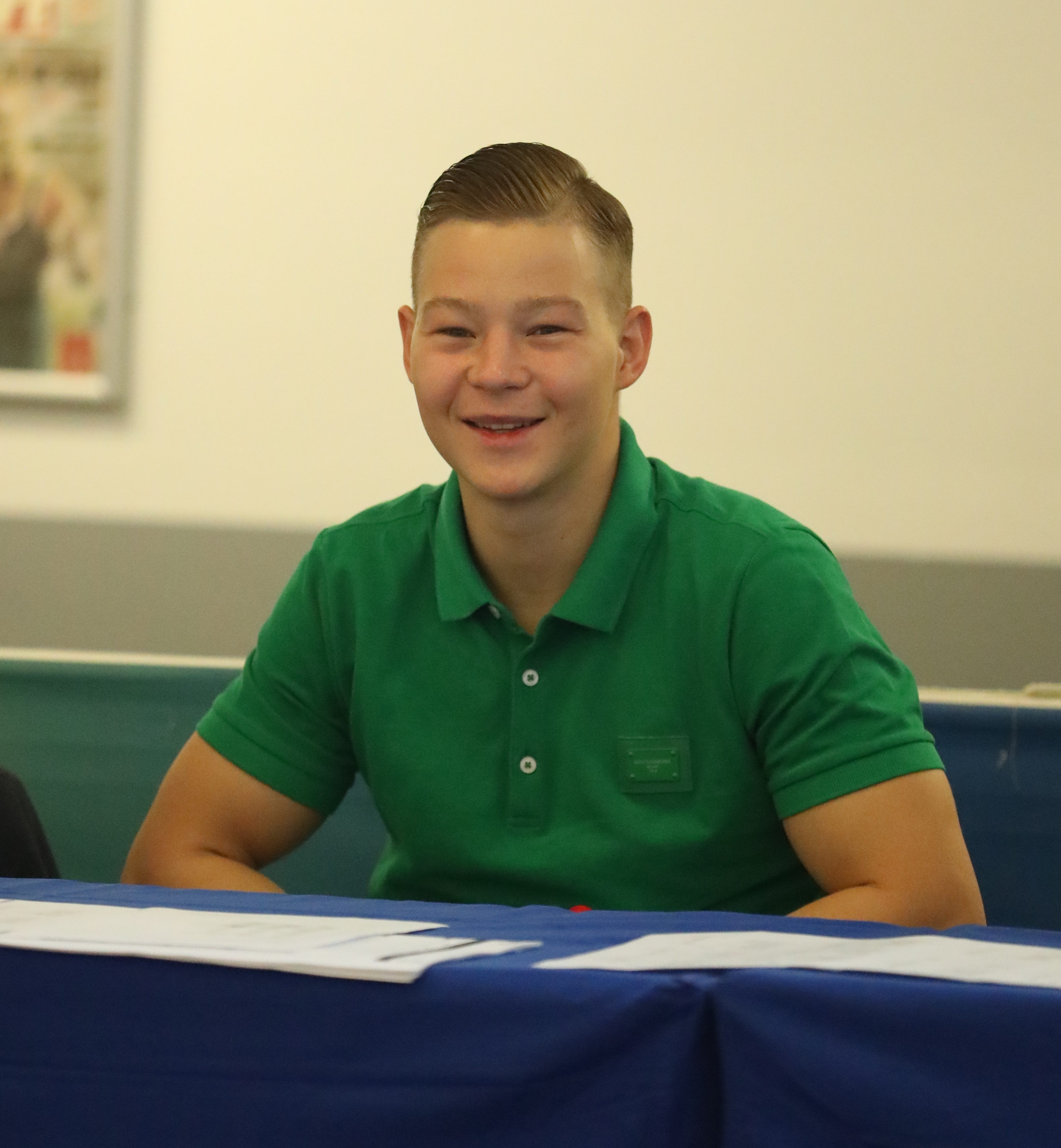
- Balázs in 2023

Personal information
- Born: 25 March 2002 (age 24) Budapest, Hungary

Gymnastics career
- Discipline: Men's artistic gymnastics
- Country represented: Hungary
- Retired: January 20, 2025
Medal record
Representing Hungary
Men's artistic gymnastics
Junior World Championships
Bronze medal – third place	2019 Győr	Horizontal bar
Youth Olympic Games
Silver medal – second place	2018 Buenos Aires	Floor
Bronze medal – third place	2018 Buenos Aires	Horizontal bar
Representing (International Olympic Committee) Mixed-NOCs
Youth Olympic Games
Gold medal – first place	2018 Buenos Aires	Mixed team

Krisztián Balázs (born 25 March 2002) is a Hungarian former artistic gymnast. He participated in the 2018 Summer Youth Olympics and the 2019 Junior World Artistic Gymnastics Championships.

== Gymnastics career ==
In 2016, he competed in the junior team competition at the 2016 European Men's Artistic Gymnastics Championships held in Bern, Switzerland.

At the 2018 Summer Youth Olympics held in Buenos Aires, Argentina, he won the silver medal in the floor exercise and the bronze medal in the horizontal bar. He also won the gold medal in the mixed multi-discipline team event. At the 2019 Junior World Artistic Gymnastics Championships in Győr, Hungary, he won the bronze medal in the horizontal bar. A month later, he won the bronze medal in the men's parallel bars event at the 2019 European Youth Summer Olympic Festival held in Baku, Azerbaijan.

In 2020, he won the silver medal in the junior men's team event at the 2020 European Men's Artistic Gymnastics Championships held in Mersin, Turkey. He also won the gold medal in the junior horizontal bar event and the bronze medal in the junior all-around event.

He competed at the 2021 European Artistic Gymnastics Championships held in Basel, Switzerland.

In 2025, on the advice of his doctors, he retired from competitive sport due to incurable spinal problems. He currently works as a coach.

== Gallery ==
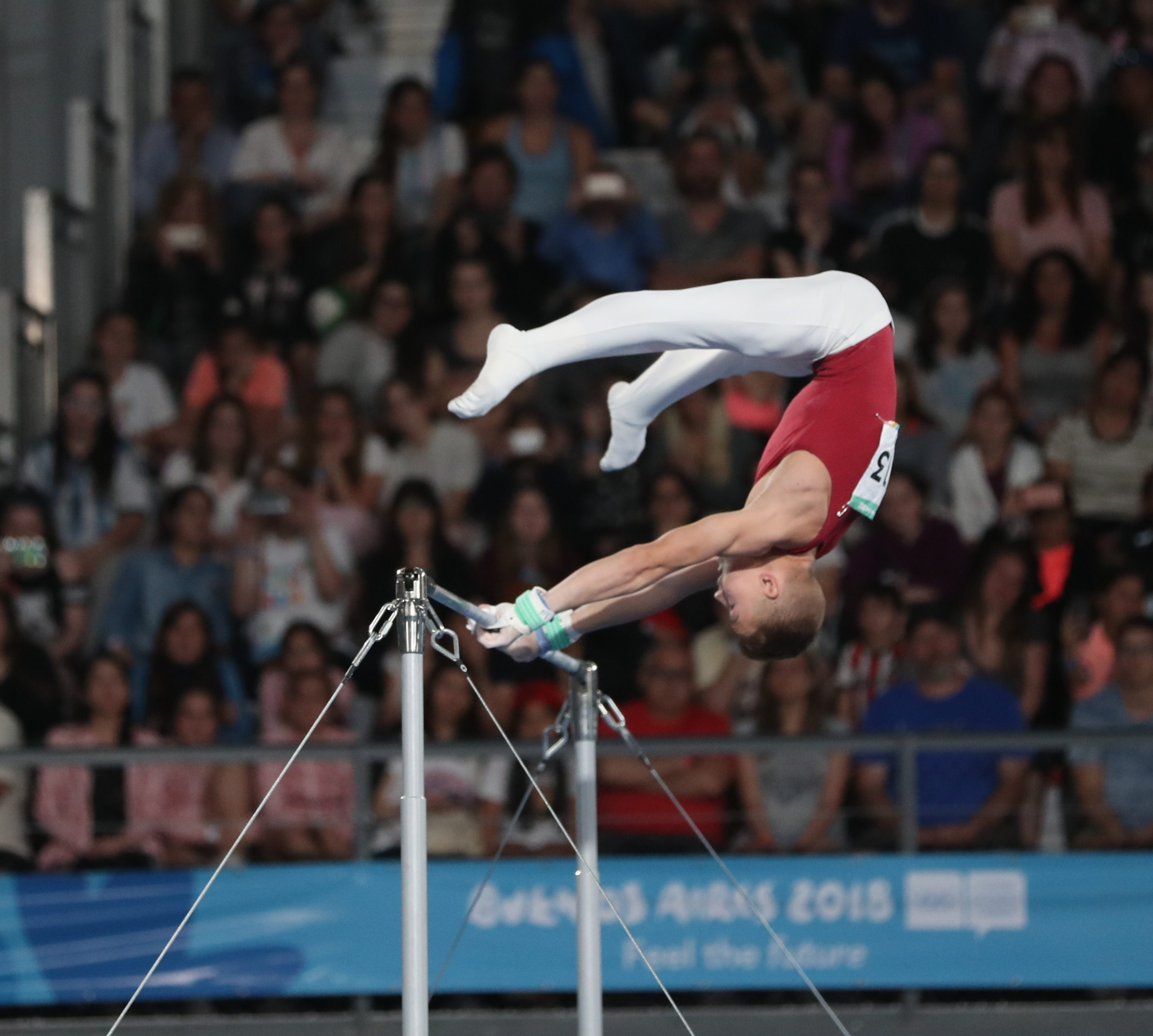
Horizontal bar

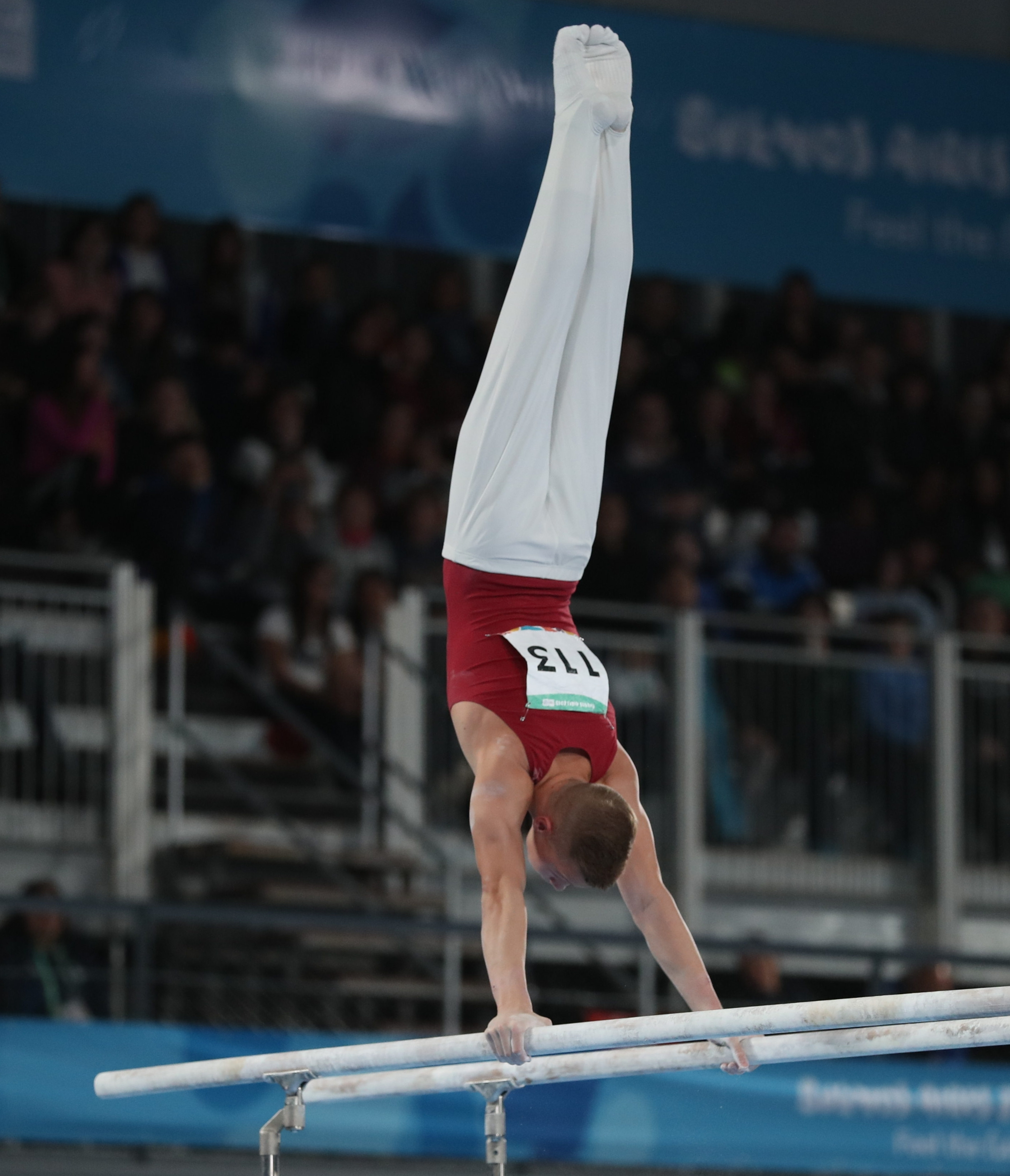
Parallel bars

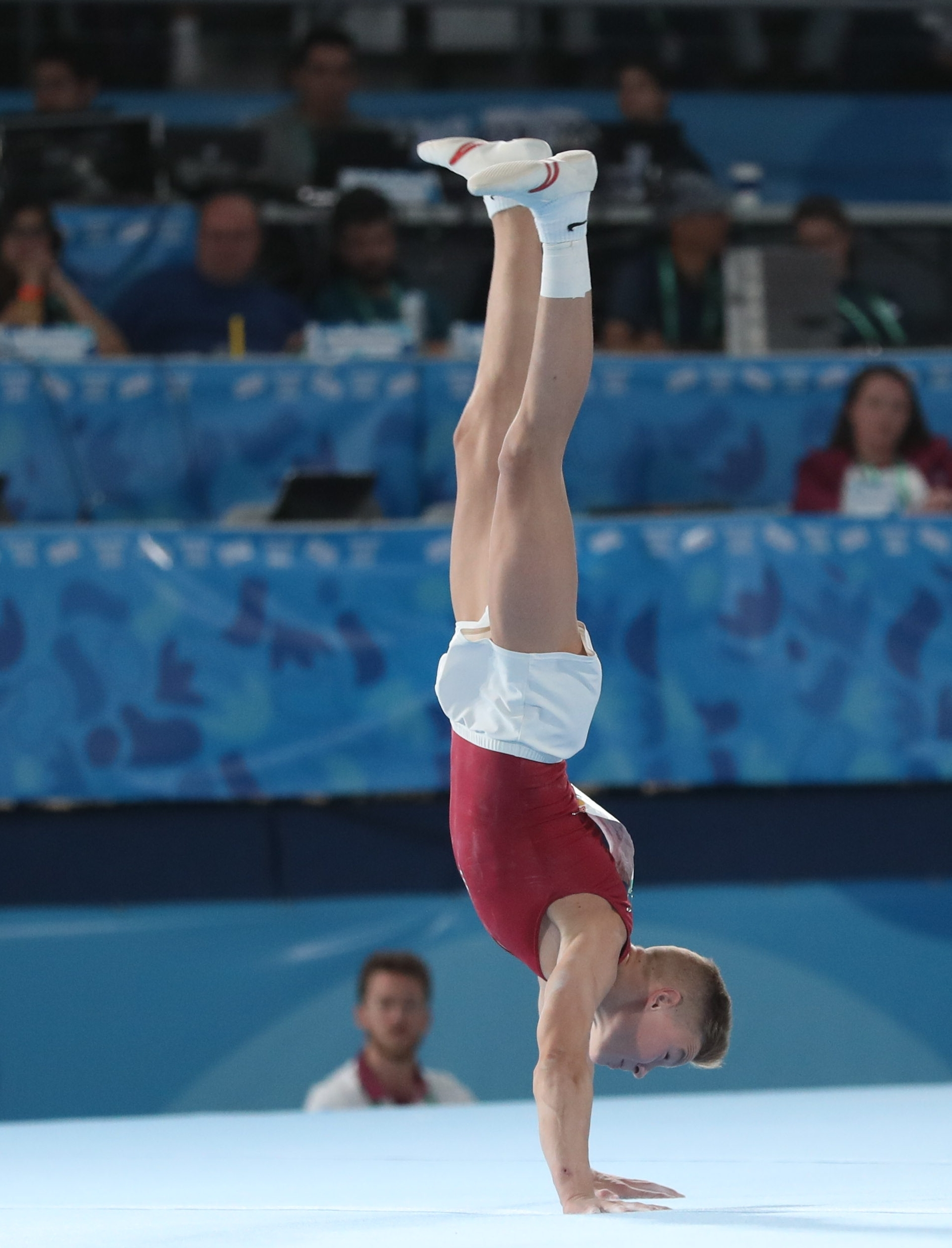
Floor exercise

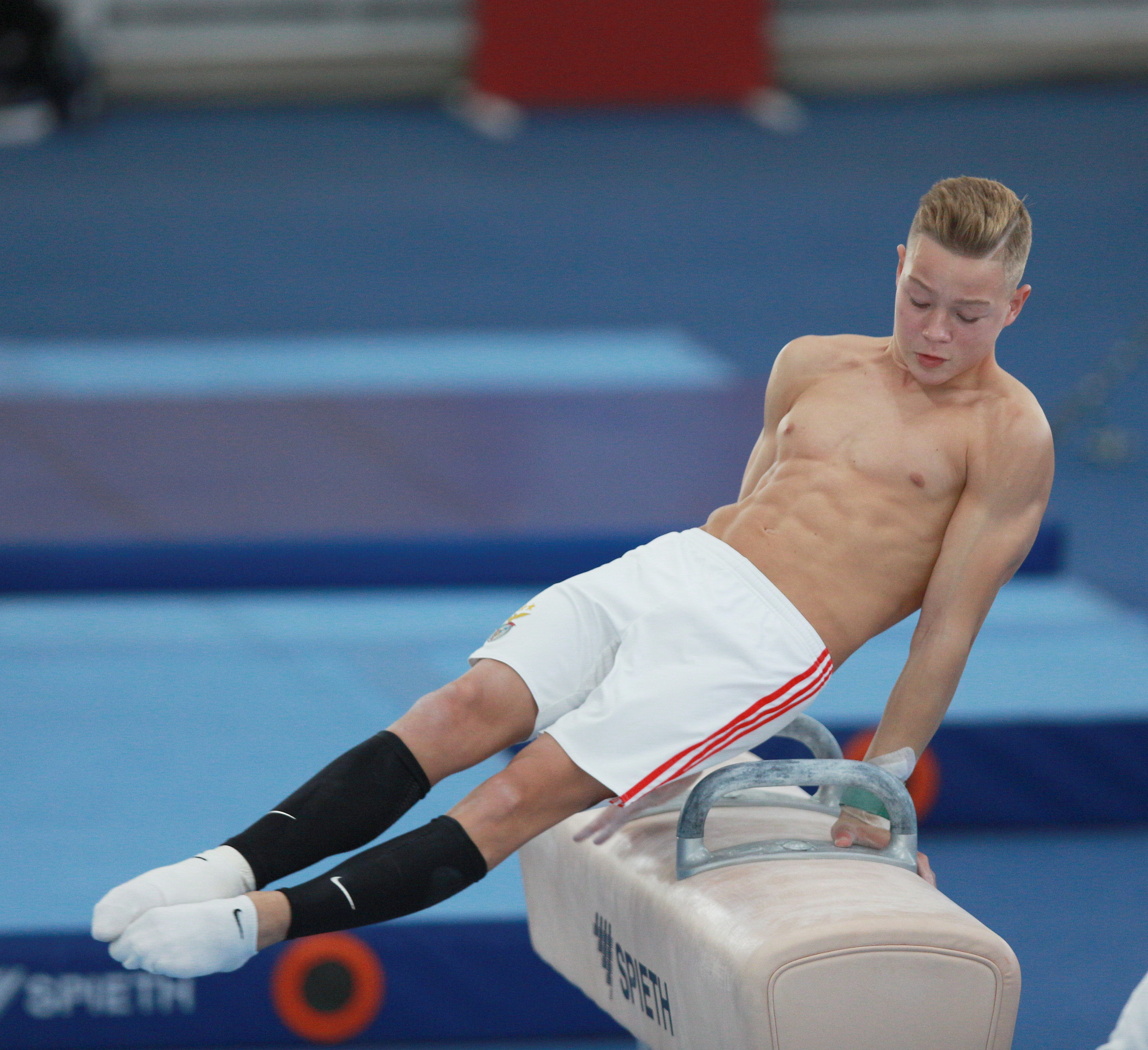
Pommel horse

Krisztián Balázs at the 2018 Summer Youth Olympics
