= Gymnastics at the 2018 Summer Youth Olympics – Boys' horizontal bar =

Boys' horizontal bar at the III Summer Youth Olympic Games
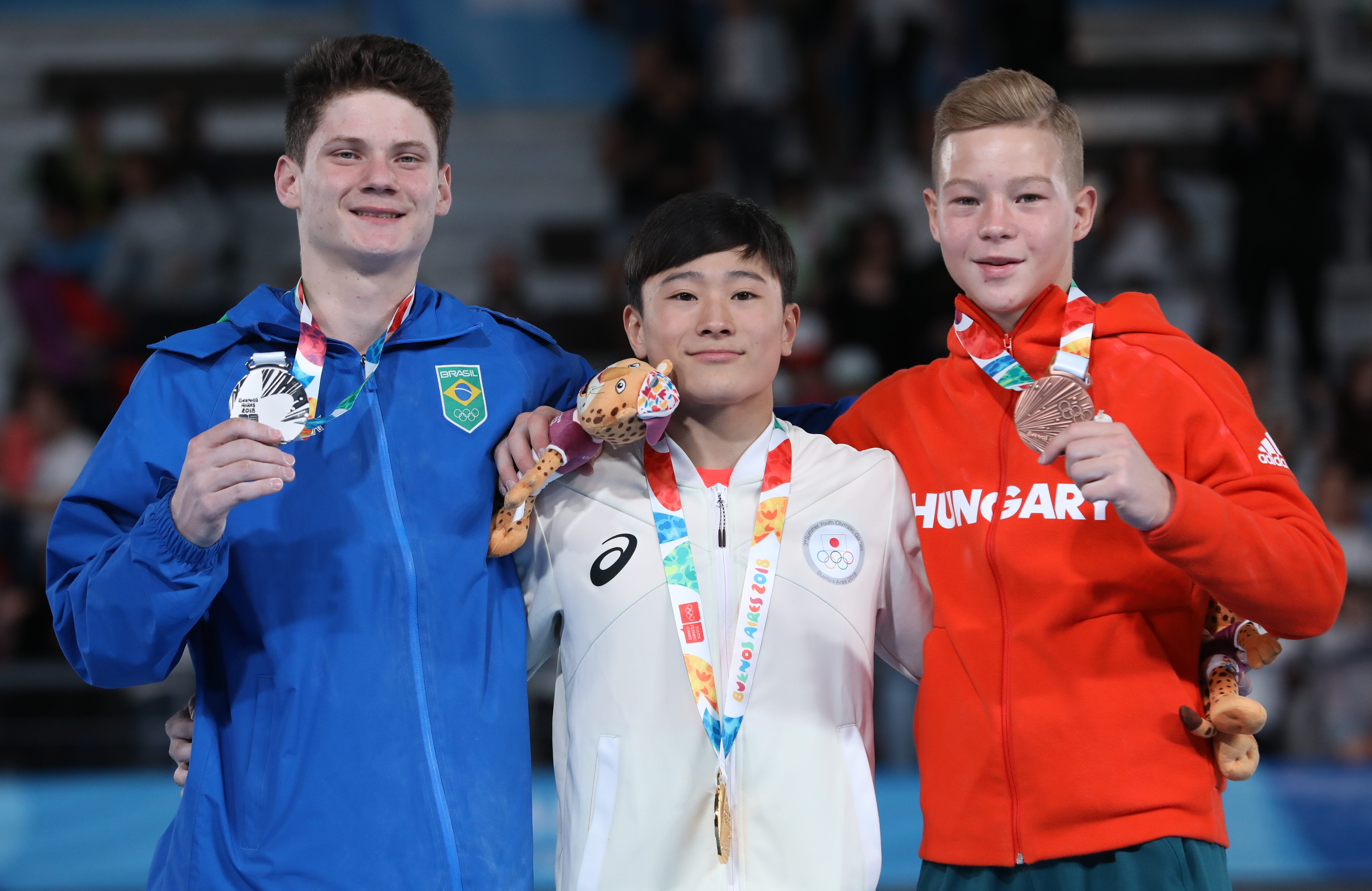
- Venue: America Pavilion
- Date: 15 October
- Competitors: 8 from 8 nations
- Winning score: 13.566

Medalists
1st place, gold medalist(s)		Takeru Kitazono	Japan
2nd place, silver medalist(s)		Diogo Soares	Brazil
3rd place, bronze medalist(s)		Krisztián Balázs	Hungary

The boys' horizontal bar competition at the 2018 Summer Youth Olympics was held at the America Pavilion on 15 October.

== Qualification ==
Rank	Gymnast	D Score	E Score	Pen.	Total	Qualification
1	Takeru Kitazono (JPN)	5.000	8.600		13.600	Q
2	Krisztián Balázs (HUN)	4.400	8.966		13.366	Q
3	Diogo Soares (BRA)	4.600	8.700		13.300	Q
4	Sergei Naidin (RUS)	4.700	8.600		13.300	Q
5	Félix Dolci (CAN)	4.300	8.933		13.233	Q
6	Brandon Briones (USA)	4.600	8.400		13.000	Q
7	Lay Giannini (ITA)	4.500	8.433		12.933	Q
8	Oļegs Ivanovs (LAT)	4.500	8.233		12.733	Q
9	Vlada Raković (SRB)	4.000	8.700		12.700	R1
10	Adam Tobin (GBR)	4.200	8.500		12.700	R2
11	Pablo Calvache (ECU)	4.200	8.366		12.566	R3

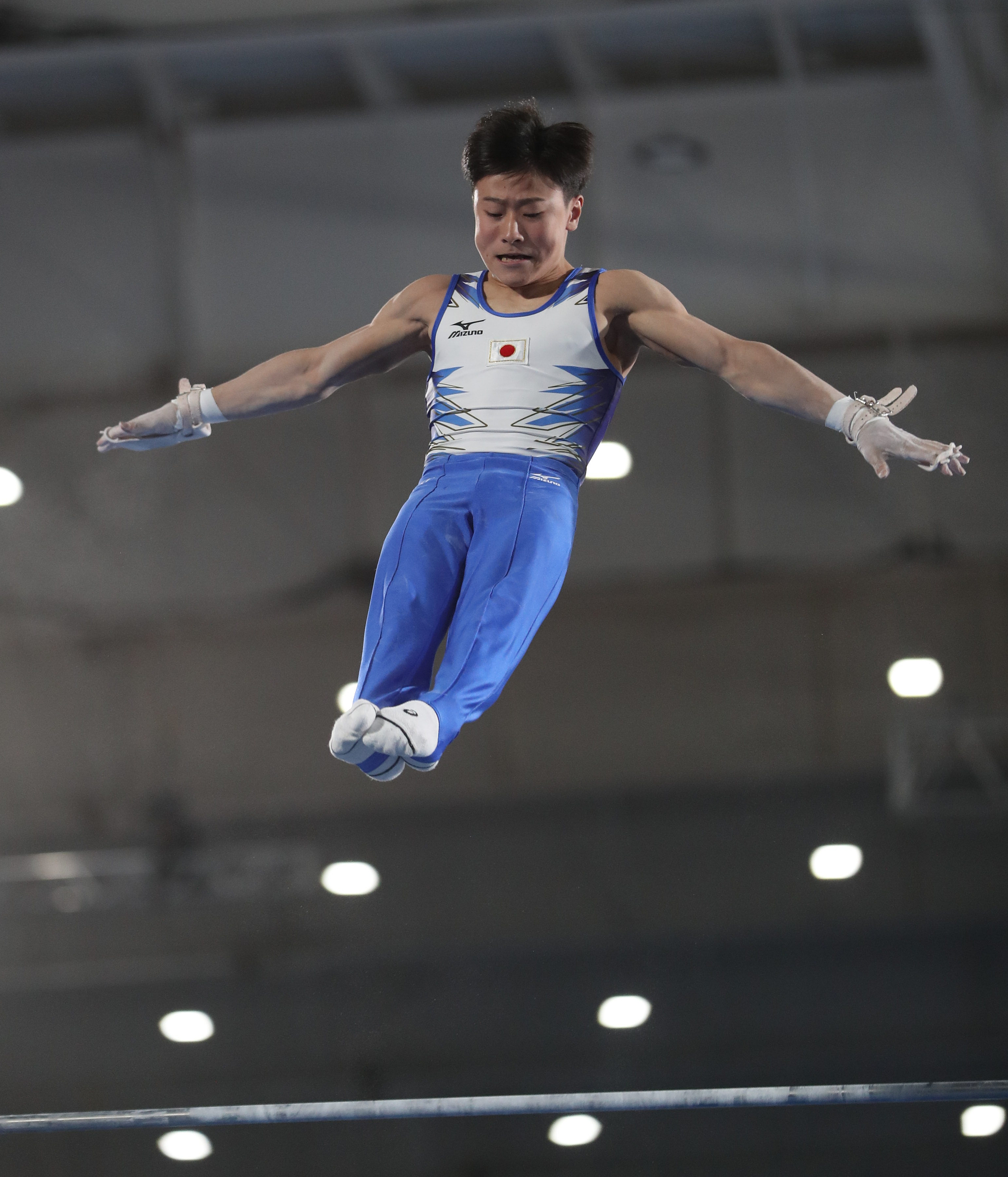
Takeru Kitazono

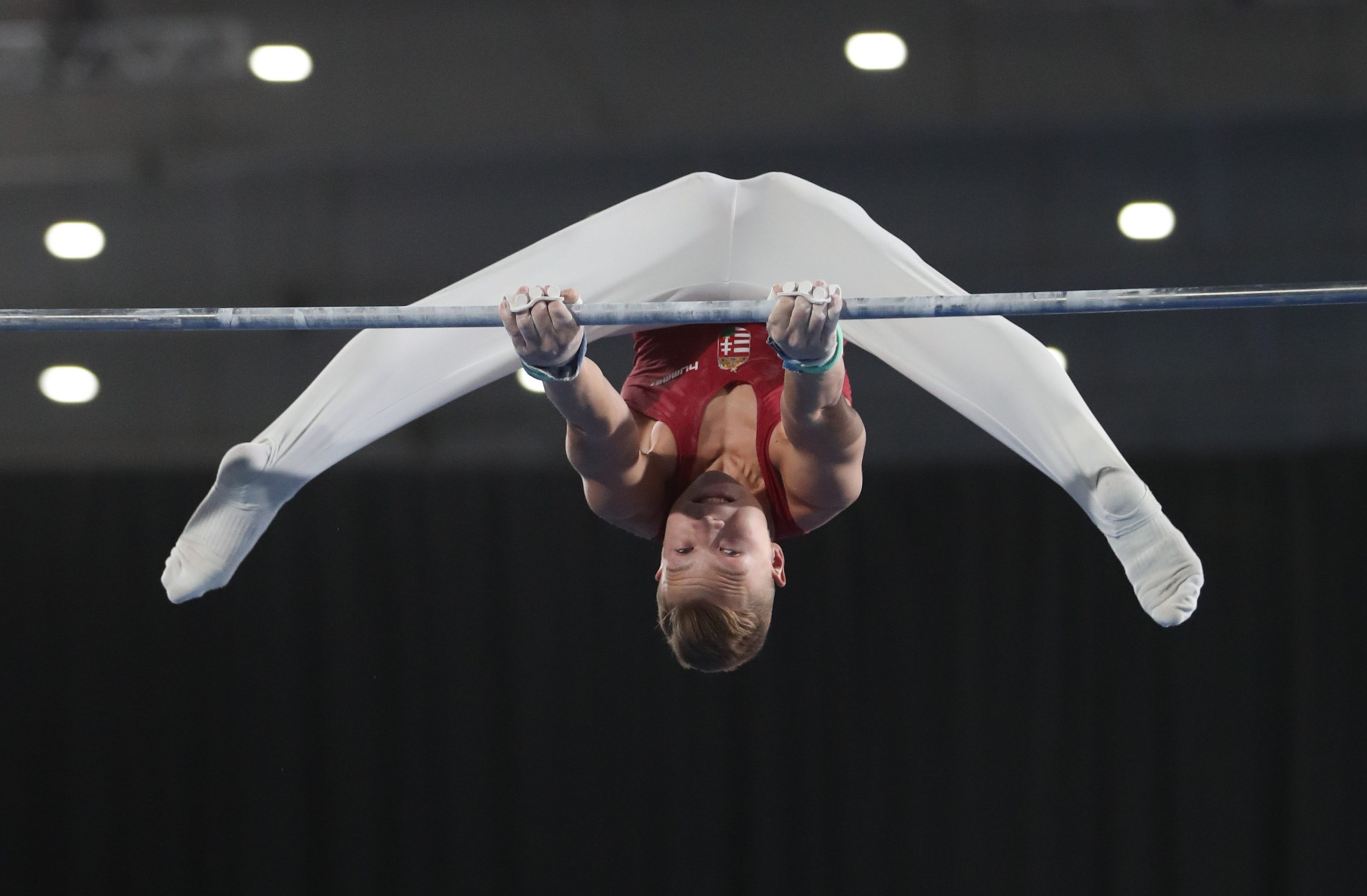
Krisztián Balázs

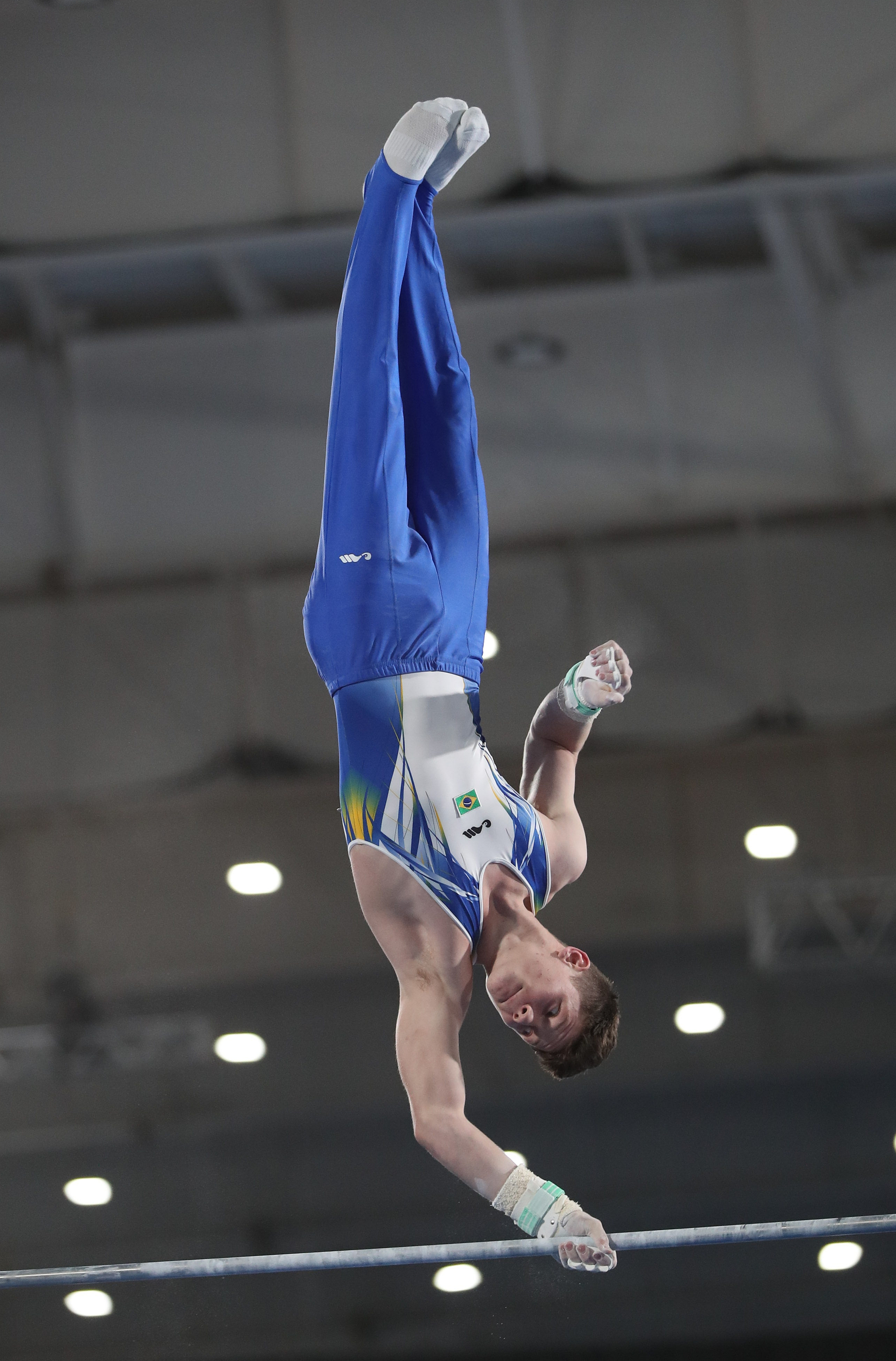
Diogo Soares

== Final ==
Rank	Gymnast	D Score	E Score	Pen.	Total
1st place, gold medalist(s)	Takeru Kitazono (JPN)	5.000	8.566		13.566
2nd place, silver medalist(s)	Diogo Soares (BRA)	4.800	8.466		13.266
3rd place, bronze medalist(s)	Krisztián Balázs (HUN)	4.400	8.833		13.233
4	Brandon Briones (USA)	4.600	8.533		13.133
5	Lay Giannini (ITA)	4.800	8.000		12.800
6	Vlada Raković (SRB)	4.000	8.691		12.691
7	Oļegs Ivanovs (LAT)	4.200	7.325		11.525
8	Félix Dolci (CAN)	4.300	7.000		11.300
	Sergei Naidin (RUS)				DNS

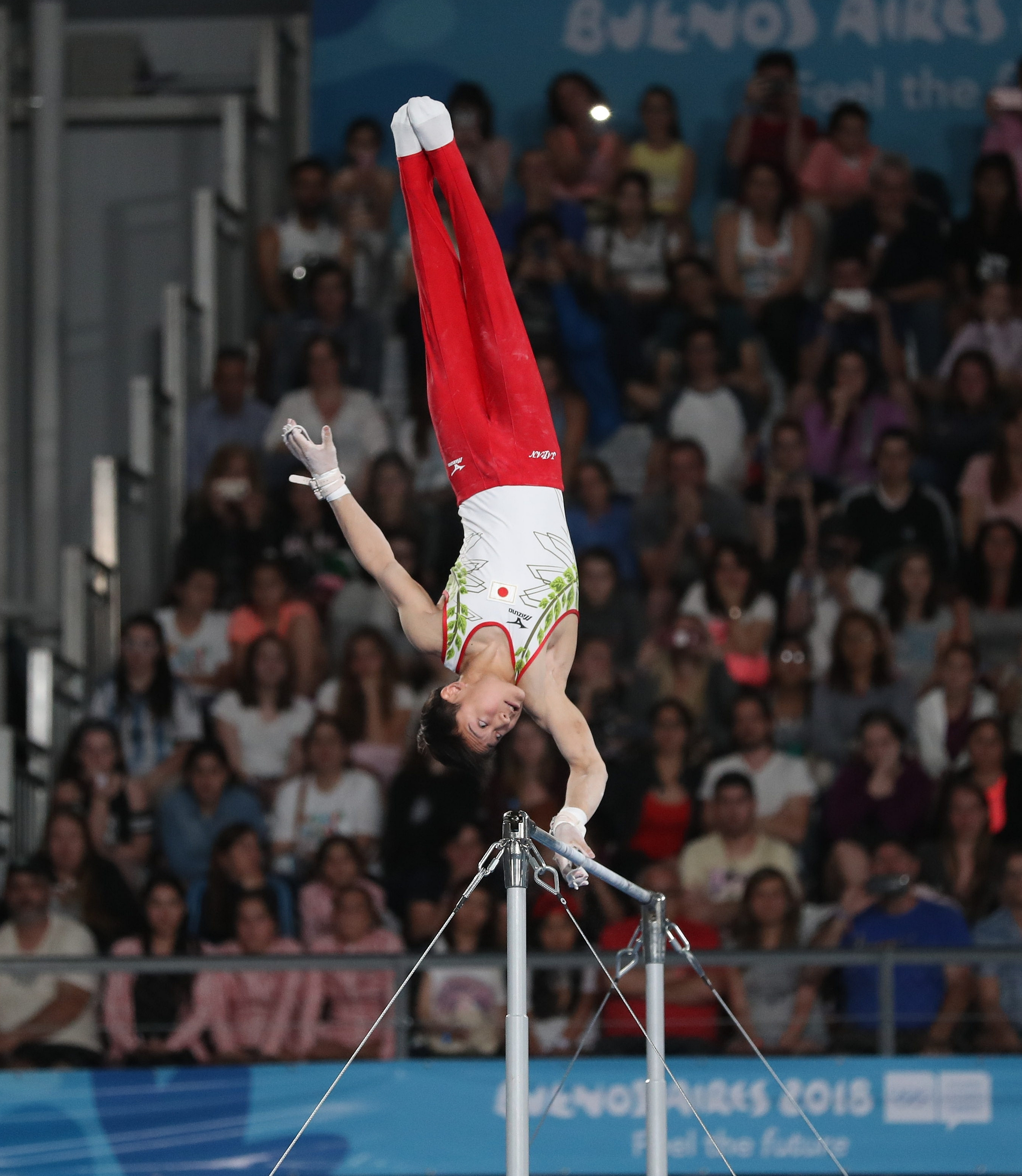
Takeru Kitazono

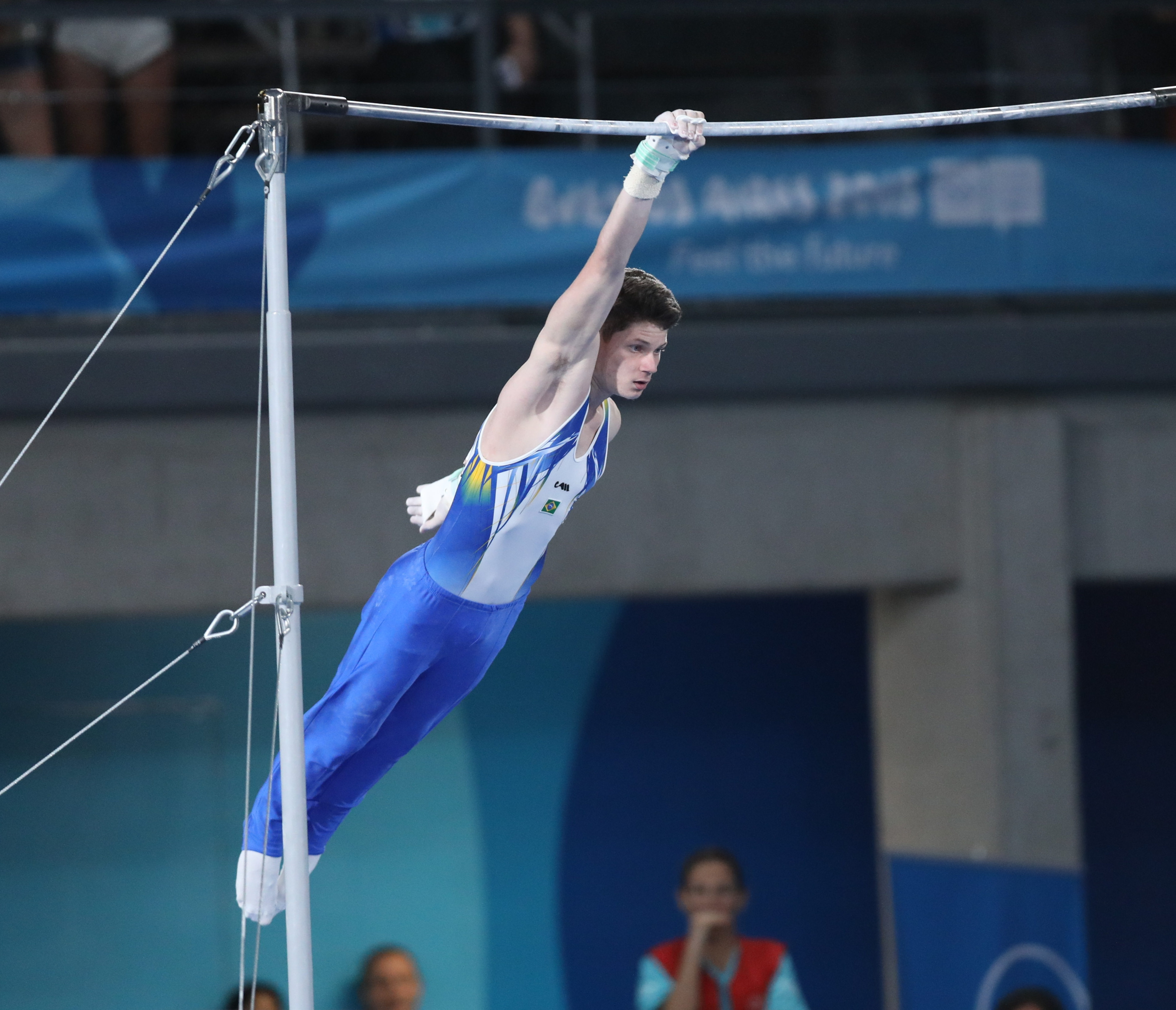
Diogo Soares

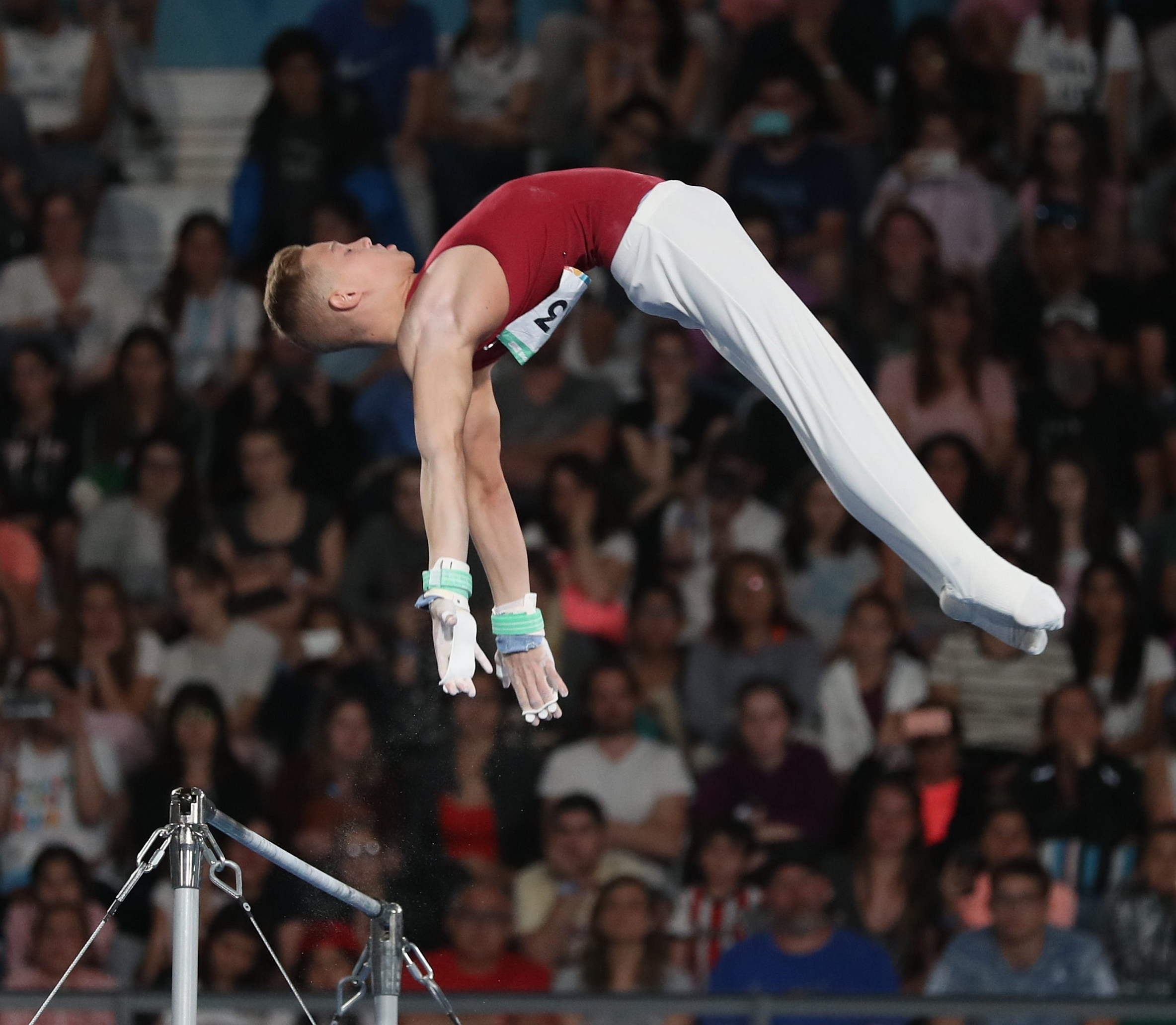
Krisztián Balázs

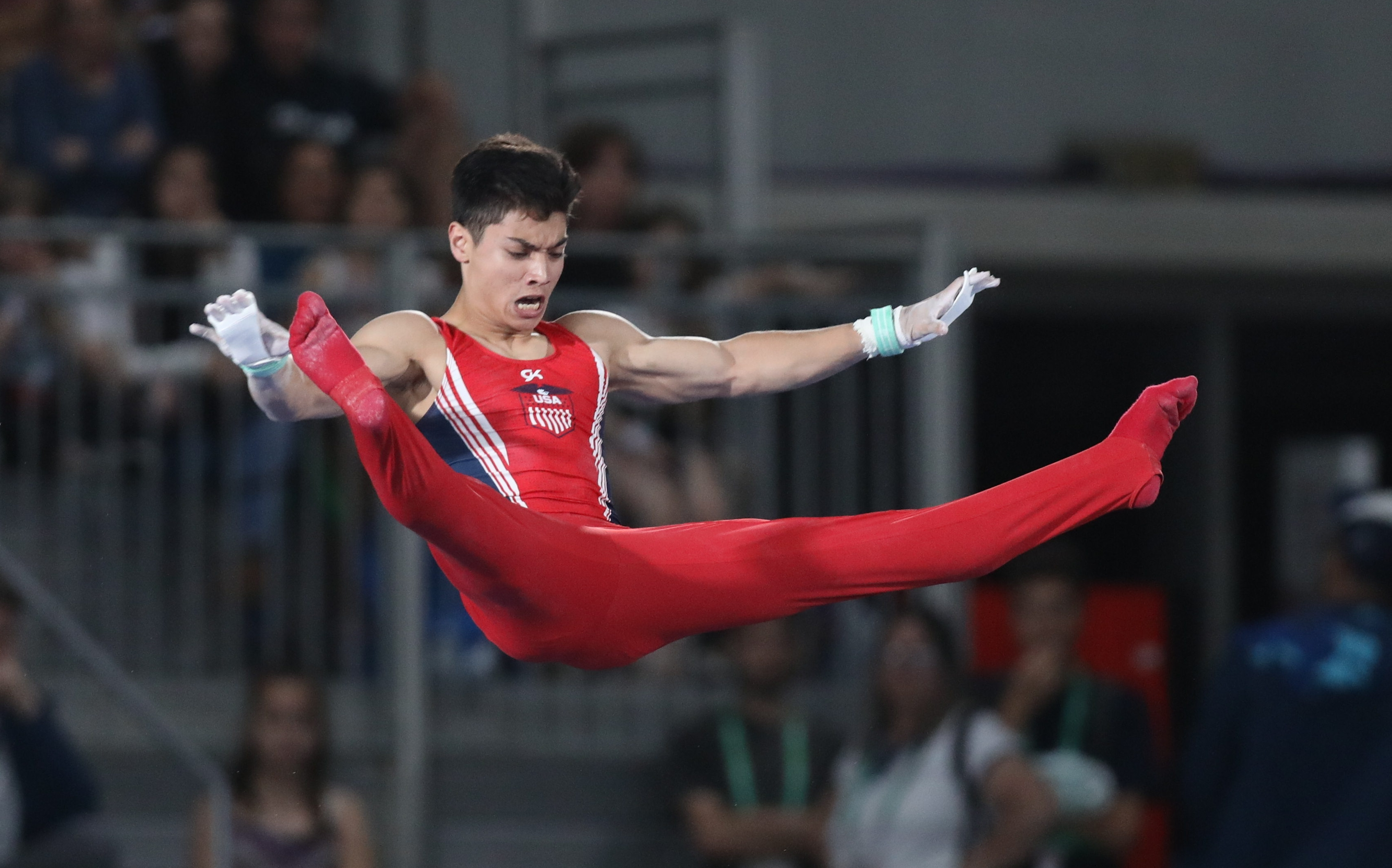
Brandon Briones

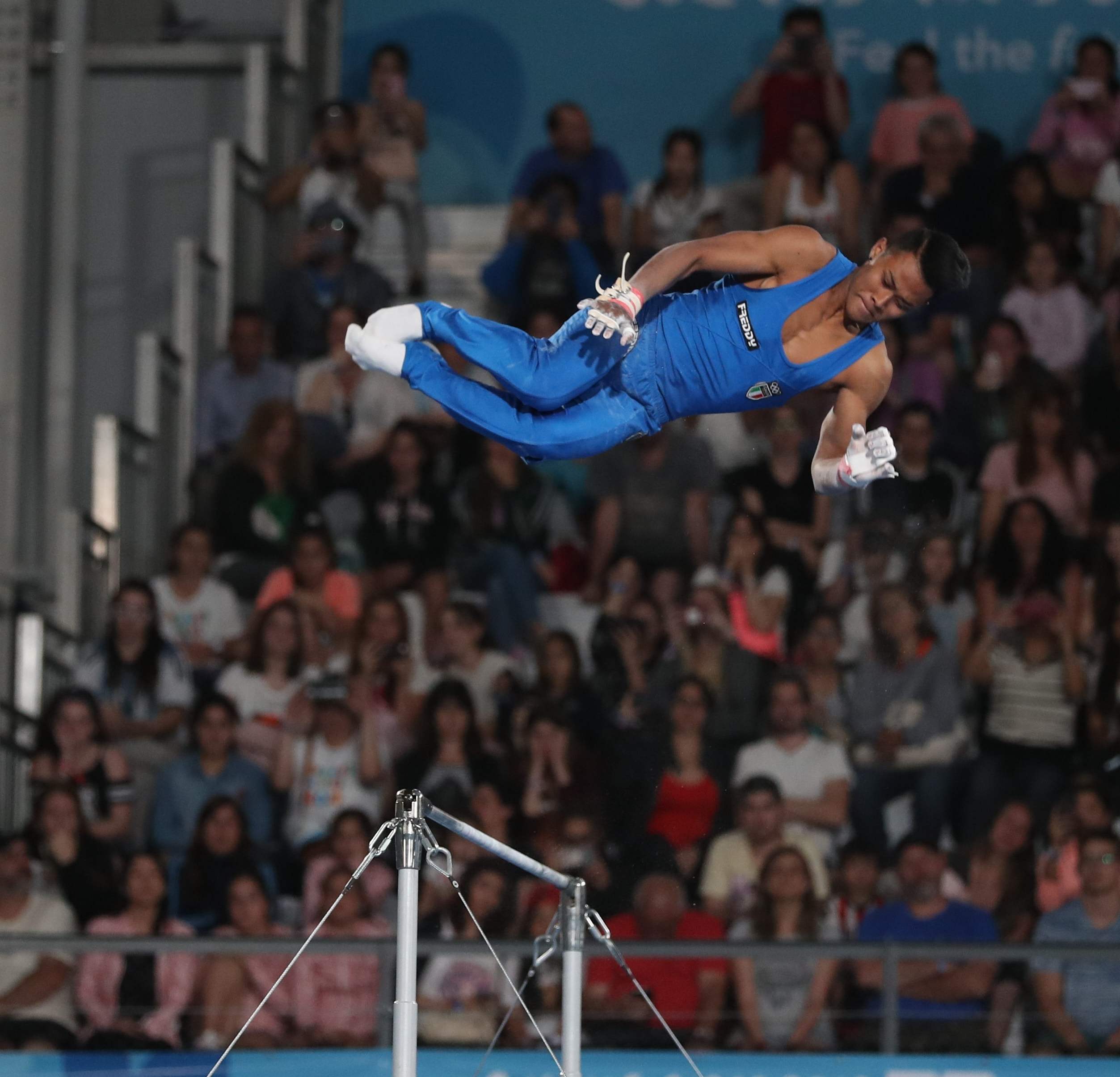
Lay Giannini

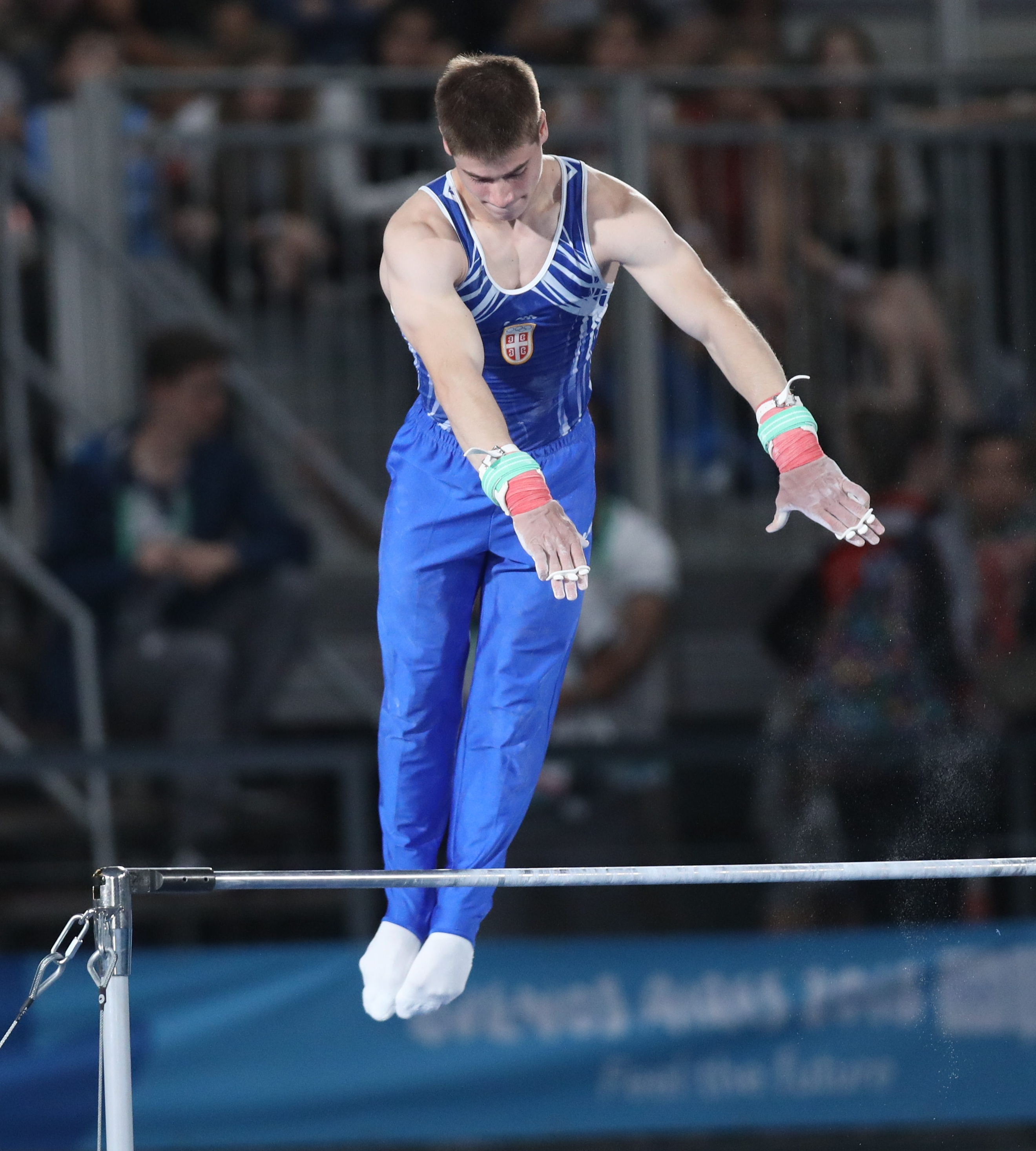
Vlada Raković

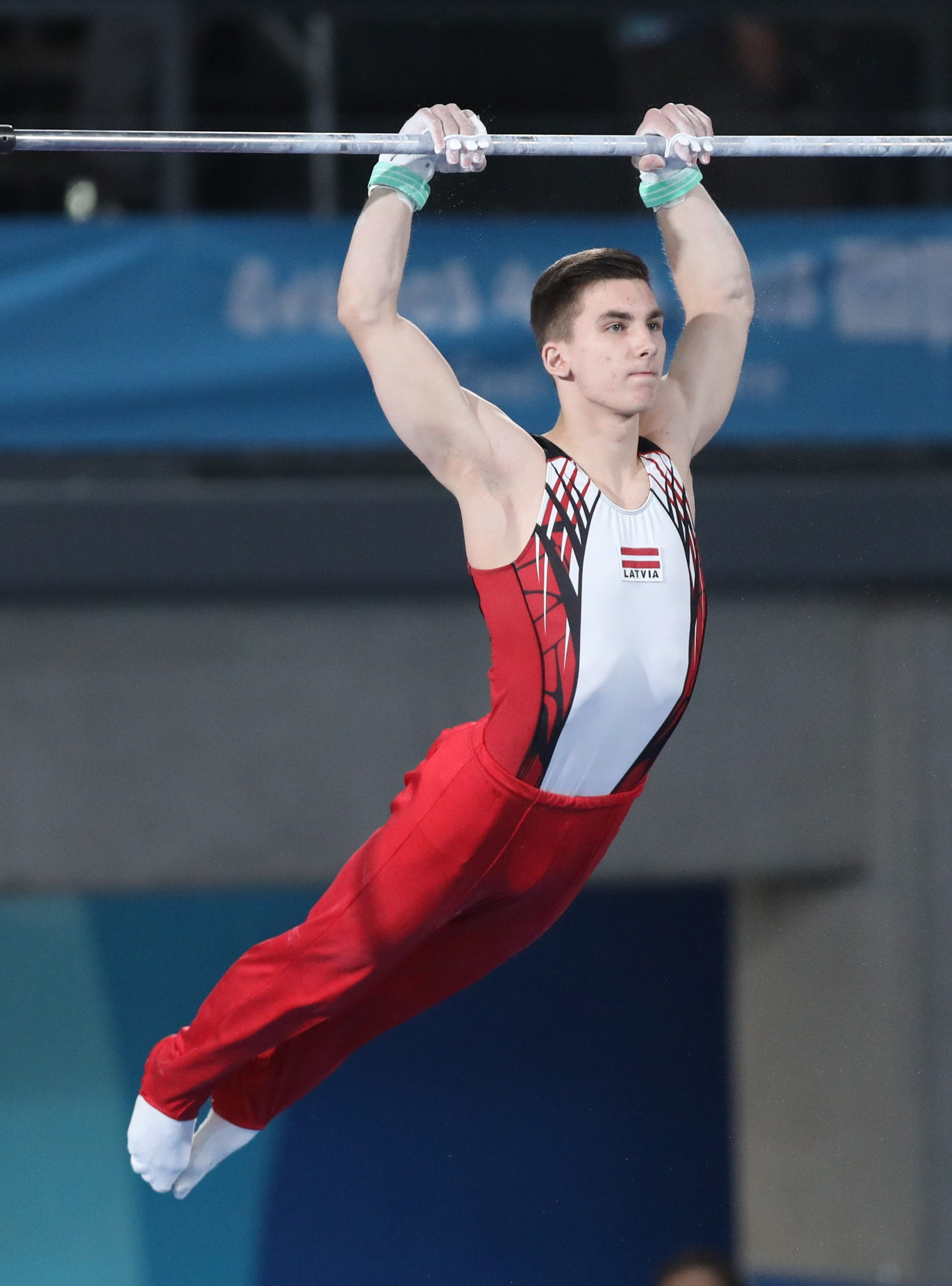
Oļegs Ivanovs

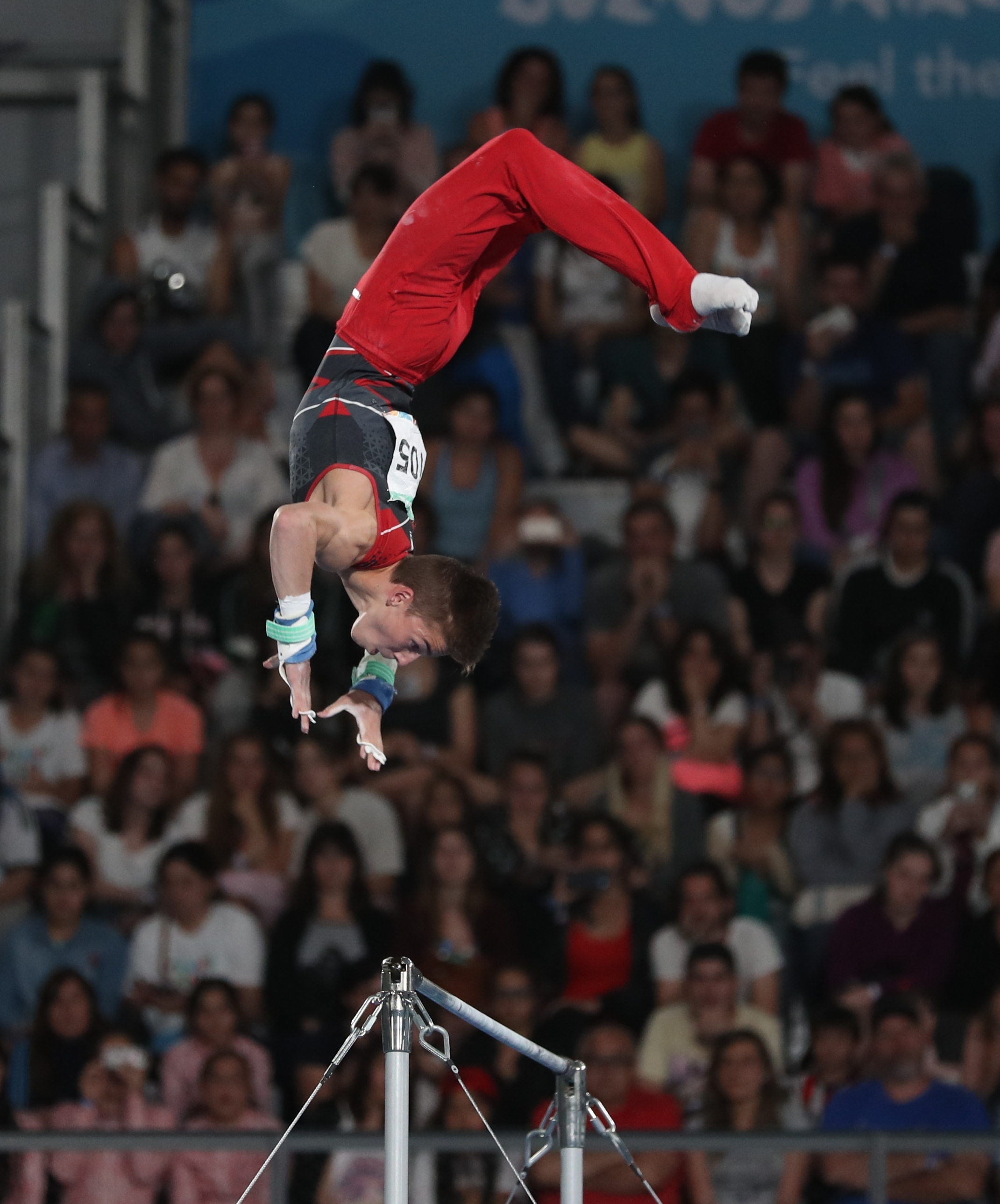
Félix Dolci
